= Phil Keaggy discography =

- Studio albums: 46
- Live albums: 7
- Compilation albums: 6
- Tribute albums: 9

This is a listing of official releases by Phil Keaggy, an American acoustic and electric guitarist and vocalist.

== Studio albums ==
- What a Day, 1973
- Love Broke Thru, 1976
- Emerging Phil Keaggy Band, 1977, reissued on CD in 2000 as Re-Emerging minus one song plus four new ones
- The Master and the Musician, 1978 instrumental album, later reissued on CD with bonus track. A 30th anniversary edition was released in 2008 and included a bonus disc of alternate takes and an interview.
- Ph'lip Side, 1980, released in two versions (one song different and in different sequence)
- Town to Town, 1981
- Play thru Me, 1982
- Underground, 1983, later reissued on CD with a different track sequence
- Getting Closer!, 1985, later reissued on CD with a different track sequence and bonus tracks
- Way Back Home, (original) 1986
- The Wind and the Wheat, 1987, instrumental album
- Phil Keaggy and Sunday's Child, 1988
- Find Me in These Fields, 1990
- Beyond Nature, 1991, instrumental album
- Revelator, 1993, six-track EP preview of the album Crimson and Blue, with abridged and extended versions of "John the Revelator"
- Crimson and Blue, 1993
- Blue, 1994
- Way Back Home, (reissue) 1994, heavily revised version of 1986 album
- True Believer, 1995
- Acoustic Sketches, 1996, instrumental album
- 220, 1996, instrumental album
- On the Fly, 1997, instrumental album
- Phil Keaggy, 1998, retroactively renamed Unspoken Words
- Premium Jams, 1999, double instrumental album
- Music to Paint By: Still Life, 1999, instrumental album
- Music to Paint By: Electric Blue, 1999, instrumental album
- Music to Paint By: Splash, 1999, instrumental album
- Music to Paint By: Brushstrokes, 1999, instrumental album
- Majesty and Wonder, 1999, Christmas album
- An Angel's Christmas, 1999, Christmas album
- Inseparable, 2000, released in a two disc version (21 tracks), then later in the year as a single disc (17 tracks)
- Uncle Duke, 2000, lyrics written originally as poetry by Keaggy's uncle Dave "Duke" Keaggy
- Zion, 2000
- Lights of Madrid, 2000, instrumental album
- Cinemascapes, 2001, instrumental album
- In the Quiet Hours, 2001, instrumental album
- Hymnsongs, 2002, instrumental album
- Freehand (Acoustic Sketches II), 2003, acoustic instrumental album
- Special Occasions, 2003
- It's Personal, 2004, lyrics originally written as poetry by Keith Moore
- Uncle Duke, 2005, re-issue of Uncle Duke, with bonus material
- Jammed!, 2006, instrumental album. Selections and remixes from Premium Jams, with bonus material.
- Roundabout, 2006, instrumental album
- Dream Again, 2006
- Two of Us, 2006, instrumental album with Mike Pachelli
- Acoustic Cafe, 2007. Primarily an album of covers, many of which are duets. Guest vocalists include Randy Stonehill.
- The Song Within, 2007, acoustic instrumental album
- Phantasmagorical: Master and Musician 2, 2008, instrumental album
- Welcome Inn, 2009, Christmas album
- Frio Suite, 2009, instrumental album with Jeff Johnson
- Inter-Dimensional Traveler, 2010, instrumental album. The album is the debut project from "The Phil Keaggy Trio", a group consisting of Keaggy, keyboardist Jack Giering and Glass Harp drummer John Sferra.
- Songs for Israel, 2010, includes Randy Stonehill, Bob Bennett and Buck Storm
- Cosmic Rumpus, 2011, instrumental album. The album is the second project from "The Phil Keaggy Trio" but now credited as "The Jack Giering Trio", a group consisting of Keaggy, keyboardist Jack Giering and Glass Harp drummer John Sferra.
- Live from Kegworth Studio, 2012.
- The Cover of Love, 2012.
- WaterSky, 2012, instrumental album with Jeff Johnson
- Infinity Unleashed, 2014, instrumental album. The album is the third project from "The Phil Keaggy Trio" but now credited as "John Sferra Trio", a group consisting of Keaggy, keyboardist Jack Giering and drummer John Sferra.
- All at Once, 2016, via a Kickstarter campaign.
- What A Day 50th Anniversary Deluxe Edition, 2023
- Love Broke Thru 50th anniversary Deluxe Edition, 2025, via a Kickstarter campaign.

== Live albums ==
- Phil Kägi, 2006, two-disc set from the 2006 Swiss Tour (Switzerland release only)

With 2nd Chapter of Acts and "A Band Called David"

- How the West Was One, 1977

With Randy Stonehill

- Together Live!, 2005

Compassion All-Star Band

- 1 By 1 (One by One) Live!, 1988. In addition to Keaggy, the band features Margaret Becker (vocals, guitar), Randy Stonehill (vocals, guitar), John Andrew Schreiner (keyboards, vocals), Rick Cua (bass, vocals), Mike Mead (drums, percussion) and Joe English (drums, percussion, vocals).

With Glass Harp

- Live at Carnegie Hall, 1997. This concert had originally been recorded in 1971 but remained in the vaults until 1997. One track, "Do Lord", appeared on Keaggy's compilation album Time: 1970-1995 prior to the official release of Live at Carnegie Hall.
- Strings Attached, 2000 (double album). This collection also features live versions of several Keaggy solo tunes such as "From the Beginning", "Chalice", "Inseparable", "John the Revelator", "True Believer", "Shades of Green", "Overture (for Guitar and Orchestra)", and "Tender Love".
- Stark Raving Jams, 2004 (triple album). Includes live versions of Keaggy's solo material such as "Salvation Army Band" (listed as "SAB Jam") and "Nothing But the Blood of Jesus".
- Glass Harp Live at the Beachland Ballroom 11.01.08.

== Compilations ==
- Prime Cuts, 1987 UK release only. Features selected tracks from Keaggy's 1980-85 albums
- The Best of Keaggy: The Early Years 1973-1978, 1989 (unauthorized release)
- Time 1: 1970-1995, 1995
- Time 2: 1970-1995, 1995
- What Matters, 2001. This nine-song compilation draws mostly from the albums Phil Keaggy and Crimson and Blue. "Tell Me How You Feel" from Sunday's Child is also included as is a new song "What Matters". The album was produced and released exclusively for the International Bible Society.
- History Makers, 2003
- Happy Valentine's Day, 2006. This limited edition release showcased various love songs that Phil had recorded over the years.

== Soundtrack albums ==
- Southern Girls, from the 2012 film by Carl Jackson. Available for download (only) from iTunes and Amazon. The movie and soundtrack feature a collection of previously released Keaggy material.

== On tribute albums ==
- No Compromise: Remembering the Music of Keith Green, Various Artists, 1992. Keaggy contributes backing vocals to Russ Taff's rendition of "Your Love Broke Through". Keaggy had previously recorded his own version of the song for his 1976 album Love Broke Thru
- Strong Hand of Love: A Tribute to Mark Heard, Various Artists, 1994. Keaggy contributes a recording of Heard's "I Always Do", a song featured first on his Phil Keaggy and Sunday's Child album in 1988.
- Orphans of God, Various Artists, 1996. This is a second tribute album to Mark Heard. Keaggy sings and plays on a remake of "Everything is All Right". Keaggy originally recorded the song featured for his 1988 album Phil Keaggy and Sunday's Child.
- The Jesus Record, Rich Mullins & A Ragamuffin Band, 1998. Keaggy performs "All the Way to Kingdom Come".
- Coming Up! A Tribute to Paul McCartney, Various Artists, 2001. Keaggy sings and plays on a cover version of "Somedays", a song that McCartney originally recorded for his 1997 album Flaming Pie.
- Making God Smile: A Tribute to Beach Boy Brian Wilson, Various Artists, 2002. Keaggy sings and plays on a cover version of "Good Vibrations".
- Come Together: America Salutes The Beatles, Various Artists, 2003. Keaggy and PFR team up for a remake of "We Can Work It Out".
- Full Circle: A Celebration of Songs and Friends, Charlie Peacock, 2004. A collection of Charlie Peacock songs re-recorded by various artists. Keaggy and Bela Fleck provide instrumental backing to Sarah Groves' vocals on "In the Light".
- A Musical Tribute To C.S. Lewis, Various Artists, 2005. Keaggy song "Addison's Walk" from Beyond Nature
- Life is Precious: A Tribute to Wes King, Various Artists, 2006. Keaggy contributes a rendering of "Getting Used to the Darkness".
- Yesterday: A Tribute to John Lennon and Paul McCartney, 2006, with Pat Coil and Mark Douthit. Keaggy sings and plays guitar on "And I Love Her".

== Other collaborations ==
- The Courts of the King: The Worship Music of Ted Sandquist, 1977. Worship music album that includes artists Nedra Ross, Ted Sandquist, Lynn Nichols, Phil Madeira, Terry Anderson and The Love Inn Company
- 25 Songs of Christmas, Various Artists, 1982. Includes Keaggy's instrumental version of "We Three Kings".
- Exercise for Life, Various Artists, 1983. Album from Stormie Omartian. Keaggy's song "Just a Moment Away" included.
- C.A.U.S.E. (Christian Artists United to Save the Earth), Various Artists, 1985. Keaggy, along with many other Christian artists, contributed to the making of audio and video recording of the song, "Do Something Now."
- Fight the Fight: Rescue the Unborn, Various Artists, 1985.
- Shake: Christian Artists Face the Music, Various Artists, 1988. Interviews, songs, and snippets featuring artists on the Myrrh label.
- Our Hymns, Various Artists, 1989. Keaggy contributes a cover of "O God Our Help in Ages Past".
- Our Christmas, Various Artists, 1990. Keaggy sings a duet with Kim Hill on "God Rest Ye Merry Gentlemen." Hill also arranged the song.
- The Rock Revival: Feeling the Spirit, Vol. 1, Various Artists, 1991. Includes Keaggy's work with Paul Clark on "Listen Closely" and "Song of Love" with Keaggy, Paul Clark, Mike Burhart, John Mehler and Jay Truax.
- New Young Messiah, Various Artists, 1993. Keaggy plays the instrumental "Pastorale".
- Love Songs for a Lifetime-30 Great Love Songs, Various Artists, 1996. Keaggy sings "What A Wonder You Are" with Michele Pillar.
- Sing Me to Sleep, Daddy, Various Artists, 1997. Keaggy performs "Brahms' Lullaby".
- Surfonic Water Revival, 1998. Keaggy plays guitar on "Surfer's Paradise" and "California Blue".
- Seize the Day and Other Stories, Carolyn Arends, 2000. Keaggy adds electric guitar on the live "Go with God".
- The Prayer of Jabez Music: a Worship Experience, Various Artists, 2001. Keaggy and Geoff Moore team up for the duet "Touch of Greatness".
- City on a Hill: Sing Alleluia, Various Artists, 2002. Keaggy plays guitar on "The Lord's Prayer", and sings on "Communion".
- One, Neal Morse, 2004. Keaggy has a guitar solo during the songs "The Creation" and "The Separated Man", and sings a duet with Neal on the song "Cradle to the Grave".
- His Passion (the Christ): Remembering the Sacrifice, Various Artists, 2004. Keaggy sings a version of the old spiritual "Were You There When They Crucified My Lord".
- Behold the Lamb of God, Andrew Peterson and Various Artists, 2004
- Sweet Dreams and Starry Nights, Various Artists, 2005. Keaggy performs "Brahms' Lullaby".
- Christmas Treasures, Various Artists, 2006. Keaggy contributes acoustic instrumental versions of "Coventry Carol" and "In the Bleak Midwinter".
- Resurrection Worship, Various Artists, 2009. Keaggy contributed the song "He is Risen".
- CPR 3, Various Artists, 2009. Keaggy contributes a re-recorded version of the song "Passport". The original version appears on Keaggy's 1995 album Sounds.
- Far Away from Everyday, Brad Hoyt, 2013. Keaggy collaborated on the song "Look Inside".
- “Illuminations”, Keaggy and Rex Paul (aka Paul Schnelle), 2019. Album is largely Keaggy originals that have been re-worked to produce an album with much improved sound enhancements and extended guitar solos as well as vocal harmonies that update the sense of holistically developed structure in a contemporary context.
- No Eye Has Seen, instrumental (single) collaboration with Michael Lewis, 2025

== With The Squires ==
- Unofficial Demo (c. 1966)
- Official Demo; recorded at United Audio studios, (c. 1966)
- "Batmobile" (single), "I Don't Care" (b-side); Penguin Records (c. 1966)

== With The New Hudson Exit ==
- "Come with Me" (single), "Waiting For Her" (b-side); Date Records (c. 1967)

== With Glass Harp ==
Singles

- "Where Did My World Come From?", 1969. B-side: "She Told Me".

Albums

- Glass Harp, 1970
- Synergy, 1971
- It Makes Me Glad, 1972
- Song in the Air, 1977 (Compilation album)
- Live at Carnegie Hall, 1997
- Strings Attached, 2000
- Hour Glass, 2003
- Stark Raving Jams, 2004
- Glass Harp Live At The Beachland Ballroom 11.01.08, 2010

== With Cosmic Cathedral ==
- Deep Water, 2025

== Collaborative works ==
With Muriel Anderson

- Uncut Gems, 2003. Featuring contributions from special guest Stanley Jordan.

With Mike Pachelli

- Two of Us (Groovemasters Volume 10) Solid Air, 2006
- Adventure-Us, 2022

With Jeff Johnson

- Frio Suite, 2009
- WaterSky, 2012
- WinterSky Live, 2015
- Cappadocia, 2019
- Spinning on a Cosmic Dime, 2024

With Tyler Bender Band

- The Rain, 2009

With Randy Stonehill

- Together Live!, 2005
- Mystery Highway, 2009

With Scott Dente and Wes King

- Invention, 1997

With Jerry Marotta and Tony Levin

- The Bucket List, 2019

With Rex Paul

- Illumination, 2019

With the Coomes Brothers

- Up All Night, 2025
- Super Sessions (also with Adam Wirdzek), 2026

With Adam Wirdzek

- Duo-Tone Inventions, 2025
- (See also Super Sessions)

Phil Keaggy & Friends (with multiple artists)

- Instrumental Duets, 2020
- Pilgrimage, 2023
- Instrumental Duets 2, 2025

== Selected list of session work ==
- Honeytree, The Way I Feel, 1974
- Joe Vitale, Roller Coaster Weekend, 1974
- Paul Clark & Friends, Come Into His Presence, 1974
- 2nd Chapter of Acts, In the Volume of the Book, 1975
- Honeytree, Evergreen, 1975
- Paul Clark & Friends, Good To Be Home, 1975
- John Fischer, Inside, 1977
- 2nd Chapter of Acts, The Roar of Love, 1978 (Released 1980)
- Nedra Ross, Full Circle, 1978
- Matthew Ward, Toward Eternity, 1979
- Michael and Stormie Omartian, Seasons of the Soul, 1979
- Michael and Stormie Omartian, The Builder, 1980
- Andraé Crouch, Don't Give Up, 1981
- Paul Clark, A New Horizon, 1981
- John Mehler, Bow and Arrow, 1982
- Michele Pillar, Michele Pillar, 1982.
- Paul Clark, Drawn To The Light, 1982
- Mylon LeFevre, More, 1983
- Randy Stonehill, Celebrate This Heartbeat, 1984
- Jamie Owens-Collins, A Time For Courage, 1985
- Paul Clark, Out Of The Shadow, 1985
- Greg X. Volz, The River Is Rising, 1986. Keaggy plays guitar on "Hold On to the Fire"
- Twila Paris, Same Girl, 1987
- Mark Farner, Just Another Injustice, 1988
- Randy Stonehill, Can't Buy A Miracle, 1988
- Sheila Walsh, Say So, 1988
- Tim Miner, I Know You Think You Know, 1988
- Tony Guerrero, Tiara, 1988
- Phil and John, Don't Look Now...It's The Hallelujah Brothers, 1989
- Bruce Carroll, The Great Exchange, 1990. Keaggy plays guitar on "Living in the Pages"
- David Mullen, Faded Blues, 1991. Keaggy plays guitar on "After the Hurricane"
- Twila Paris, Sanctuary, 1991
- Michael Card, The Word, 1992. Keaggy plays acoustic guitar on "A Valley Of Dry Bones"
- Michael Card, Joy In the Journey, 1992. Keaggy plays acoustic guitar on "So Many Books"
- Amy Grant, Home for Christmas (Amy Grant album), 1992. Keaggy plays acoustic guitar on "O Come All Ye Faithful"
- Love Song, Welcome Back, 1994
- Randy Stonehill, Lazarus Heart, 1994
- John Sferra, Northbound, 1995
- Carman, Mission 3:16, 1998. Keaggy plays guitar on "Surf Mission"
- Michael W. Smith, Christmastime (album), 1998. "O Christmas Tree" an instrumental duet featuring Michael W. Smith on piano and Keaggy on acoustic and electric guitars.
- Phil Madeira, 3 Horseshoes, 1999
- Steve Bell, Waiting for Aidan, electric guitar on "Jesus My Glory" and "Somebody's Gotta Pay", 2001
- Kirk Whalum, The Christmas Message, 2001. Keaggy plays guitar on the title track.
- Cheri Keaggy, Let's Fly, 2001
- Randy Stonehill, Edge of the World "That's the Way It Goes", "We Were All So Young", 2002
- Michael Card, Scribbling in the Sand: The Best of Michael Card, 2002. Keaggy plays acoustic guitar on "The Poem of Your Life".
- David Wilcox, Into the Mystery, 2003
- P.O.D., Payable on Death, "Revolution" and "Eternal", 2003
- Dispatch, All Points Bulletin, 2003
- Neal Morse, One, 2004. Electric guitar solo in "The Creation" at 8:25, Acoustic guitar solo in "The Man's Gone" (Reprise), 2nd Lead Vocals on "Cradle to the Grave."
- Kim Hill, Real Christmas, 2004. Keaggy accompanies Hill on "God Rest Ye Merry Gentlemen"
- Sara Groves, Station Wagon, 2004
- Frisk Luft, I'll Never Find Another You, 2004. Keaggy performs on "Son of Man" and "I'll Never Find Another You".
- David Wilcox, Out Beyond Ideas, 2005
- Honeytree, Call of the Harvest, 2005
- Braddigan, Watchfires, 2005. Keaggy plays lead guitar on several tracks.
- The Sunrise, We Have Not Heard, 2012. Keaggy featured on several tracks.
- Micky Dolenz, Remember, 2012
- Jason Truby, Passages, 2013. Keaggy plays guitar on "New Creation"
- James Shepard, Always, 2014. Keaggy produces two of the songs on this album.
- Jean Watson, Christmas...Not The Way It Seems, 2015. Keaggy plays guitar on "Do You Hear What I Hear?"
- Jean Watson, Steady My Gaze, 2015. Keaggy plays guitar on several songs
- Jerry Gaskill, Love & Scars, 2015
- The Key of David, A Different Dream, 2016
- Union of Sinners and Saints, Union of Sinners and Saints, 2016
- Neal Morse, Morsefest "2015" Question Mark and Sola Scriptura, 2017
- Jean Watson, Sacred, 2018. Guest performance by Keaggy

== Videos ==
- Phil Keaggy in Concert: St. Charles IL, 2004 (DVD)
- Philly Live!, 2004 (DVD)
- Phil Keaggy and Randy Stonehill: Together Live!, 2005 (DVD)
- Electric Guitar Style, 2005 (Instructional DVD)
- Acoustic Guitar Style, 2005 (Instructional DVD)
- Glass Harp LIVE Circa '72 (DVD), 2006
- The Master & the Musician: 30 Years Later Tour, 2008 (DVD)

Keaggy also appears on the video Muriel Anderson's All Star Guitar Night Concert in 2000. The two guitarists collaborate for a performance of "Tennessee Morning" from Keaggy's 220 album. Keaggy accompanies Michael Card on "The Poem of Your Life" in Card's 2002 concert video Scribbling in the Sand: The Best of Michael Card.
