= Zion (Phil Keaggy album) =

Phil Keaggy album

Studio album by Phil Keaggy
- Released: October 3, 2000
- Genres: Rock; Jazz; Country
- Length: 52:01
- Label: Canis Major
- Producers: Phil Keaggy; Tom Coomes; Jeff Lams; Lynn Nichols; John Schroeter

Zion is a concept album written and performed by the guitarist Phil Keaggy as a tribute to the master guitarmaker Ken Hoover at Zion Guitars. It was recorded exclusively on a Zion Radicaster.

== Personnel ==
- Guitar: Chad Crow, Phil Keaggy
- Bass: Bob Birch, Dave Coy, Rick Cua, Jack Giering
- Keyboards: David Harris, Jeff Lams, Phil Madeira, Smitty Price, Harlan Rogers
- Drums: Alex Acuña, Vinnie Colaiuta, Dennis Holt, Mike Mead, Paul Sansone, John Sferra, Ron Tutt
- Percussion: Alex Acuña, Ken Lewis
