= Lynn Nichols =

American songwriter

Lynn Nichols is an American songwriter, and musician from New York who now resides in Tennessee.

In 1977, Nichols was a member of the Phil Keaggy Band, with Phil Madeira, Terry Andersen and Dan Cunningham. The band released one album together, entitled Emerging. Nichols would also go on to produce three landmark rock and roll records for Keaggy, Sunday's Child in 1988, Find Me In These Fields in 1990 and Crimson and Blue in 1993. Each record featured an all star cast of musicians, including the likes of Mark Heard, Steve Taylor, Derri Daugherty, Jimmy Abegg, Ashley Cleveland, Randy Stonehill, John Mark Painter of Fleming and John, Charlie Peacock, Sam Bush, Russ Taff and fellow Keaggy Band member, Phil Madeira.

In 1991, Nichols joined Steve Taylor, Mike Mead, Wade Jaynes and Dave Perkins to form the band Chagall Guevara. The band released one album on MCA Records and started a second before disbanding. It seemed that Chagall was more well known in the UK, where they toured with such notable bands as Squeeze and headlined the Greenbelt Festival. In May of '91 Rolling Stone's, Parke Puterbaugh Reviewed them with the auspicious claim that, "Not since the Clash has a group so effectively turned militant discontent into passionate rock & roll and still maintained a sense of perspective and humor, however black." The U.S. saw them mostly touring clubs around the country and a Headline slot on the now infamous Cornerstone Festival. In 1995, Nichols, along with Mead, Tony Valenziano and Michael Townsend, recorded the album, Milk It For All It's Worth under the name of SMASH. In 1994, Nichols teamed up with fellow Chagall member, Dave Perkins to form Passafist.

Nichols has also worked on other albums by Phil Keaggy, as well as albums by The Band Perry, Mutemath, Mat Kearney, Sam Philips, Luna Halo, The Elms, Rebecca St. James, Stacie Orrico, Zoegirl, Newsboys, TobyMac, Switchfoot, Phil and John, Amy Grant, Russ Taff, Mandisa, and many others, providing A&R, production, writing or instrumental work. Nichols and producer Tedd T formed Lyntt, an artist development and branding company, in 2009. Lyntt was a collective of highly skilled and creative people who develop all aspects of an artist's career, including songwriting, record production, imaging, design, social networking, and live performance coaching.

== Discography ==
- "The Band Perry"-Pioneer, Deluxe Edition-2013 Producer, Writer, electric and acoustic guitars
- "Emmylou Harris" Mercyland, electric guitar
- "Lacey Canfield" Be A Light 2011-producer, guitar, trumpet, vocals
- "Strings Attached": Live with the Youngstown Symphony
- "Elektronica Veronica" Lose Control single, 2010-producer, guitar
- "Loren Hartley" Rollercoaster-2011 single
- "Vinyl Thief" White Light single-2012 producer
- "Sonic Flood" When Love First Cried 2010 - producer, guitars
- "Winter Wonderland" Steve Taylor Single, 1987, vocal
- "Chris Davis" 2011- Onefifteen- producer, writer
- "David Hayes" Closer-2011, producer, guitars
- "Lightswitch" HOLDING ON 2011 producer, writer, guitars
- "Stanfour" 2012 Producer, arrangement, guitars
- "Please Promise" 2011-Give And Take- producer
- "Bread of Stone" Real Life 2012 producer, writer, guitars
- "Andrew Merzi" Second Hand Tires-2013 producer, guitars, vocals
- Mat Kearney City of Black and White 2010, Guitars, vocals
- Kevin Max Cotes d' Amor, Walking through Walls, Producer, guitars, mixer
- Kevin Max Cotes d' Amor, Get on your bike, Producer, guitars, mixer
- Robbie Seay Miracles 2010, Guitars, production advisory
- Bread of Stone Saturate 2010, Producer, writer, guitars
- Julian Drive Beyond Our Eyes 2010, Producer, writer, guitars
- Charity Von unreleased 2009, Producer, writer, guitars
- Gentlemen At Arms (EP) 2008, Producer
- KNAPSACKHEROES self titled 2008, Producer, mixer, guitars
- Chanel Campbell 2008, Guitars, writer, additional production
- Delirious? Kingdom of Comfort 2008 additional production, guitars
- Delirious? Mezzamorphis (1999) Co Producer/Executive producer, A&R
- Article One, Colors and Sounds (2008) writer, guitars
- Casey Jame 2008, Producer, writer, guitars
- Julian Drive, My Coming Day (2008), Producer, writer
- Krystal Meyers (Make Some Noise) 2008 writer, guitars
- The Band Perry unreleased 2008, Producer, writer, guitars, vocals
- Britt Nicole, Say It (2007) Guitars
- Newsboys, Go (2006) writer, guitars
- Mutemath, Mutemath (Album) 2006, additional production, guitars
- Mat Kearney, Nothing Left to Lose (album) 2006, Guitars
- Confessions of a Teenage Drama Queen (film) (2004) soundtrack, Executive producer, writer, guitars
- TobyMac, Welcome to Diverse City (2004) guitars
- Mutemath, Reset (EP) 2004, additional production, guitars
- Mat Kearney, Bullet (album) 2004, guitars
- In the Name of Love: Artists United for Africa, 2004 Executive producer
- Switchfoot The Beautiful Letdown 2003, A&R
- A Walk To Remember Soundtrack, 2002 Executive producer, A&R
- Jump5, Accelerate (2003) Executive Producer, writer, guitars, A&R
- Andy Hunter°, Exodus (2002), Executive Producer, guitars, A&R
- ZOEgirl, Different Kind of Free (2003) Executive Producer, writer, guitars, A&R
- ZOEgirl, Mix of Life (2002) Executive Producer, writer, guitars, A&R
- The Elms Truth, Soul, Rock and Roll 2002 Executive producer
- Keaggy King Dente' Invention 1998 Executive producer, A&R
- The Elms Big Surprise 2001 Executive producer
- ZOEgirl, Life (2001) Executive Producer, writer, guitars, A&R
- Twila Paris Greatest Hits: Time & Again (2001) executive producer, A&R
- Twila Paris Bedtime Prayers (2001) Executive producer, A&R
- Twila Paris Signature Songs (2000) Executive producer, A&R
- Twila Paris True North (1999) Executive producer, A&R
- Delirious?, Audio Lesson over? 2001 A&R
- Switchfoot Learning to Breathe 2000, Executive Producer, A&R
- Delirious?, [Glo] 2000 Executive producer, A&R
- Luna Halo Shimmer [emi] 2000 Executive producer, A&R
- ZOEgirl, Zoegirl 2000 Executive producer, writer, guitar, A&R
- Margaret Becker,Falling Forward 1998 Executive producer, guitars, A&R
- Margaret Becker,What Kind of Love 1999 Executive producer, guitars, A&R
- Delirious?, Mezzamorphis (1999) Co Producer/Executive producer
- Pump Up the Volume Soundtrack, 1990 with Chagall Guevara producer, writer, guitars
- Chagall Guevara, 1991 with Chagall Guevara. (MCA Records) producer, writer, guitar, vocals,
- Strong Hand of Love, a tribute to Mark Heard, 1994 with Chagall Guevara producer, guitar, vocals
- Orphans of God, a tribute to Mark Heard, 1996 with Chagall Guevara, Producer, vocals, guitar
- Phil Keaggy Beyond Nature, 1992, instrumental album Collaborator
- Phil Keaggy Revelator, 1993, eight track EP preview of the album *Phil Keaggy Crimson and Blue, with abridged and extended versions of "John the Revelator" producer, writer, guitars
- Phil Keaggy Crimson and Blue, 1993 producer, writer, guitars
- Phil Keaggy Blue, 1994 producer, writer, guitars
- Phil Keaggy Find Me In These Fields, 1990 producer, writer, guitars
- Milk It For All It's Worth, 1995 with SMASH producer, vocals, guitars
- Passafist, 1994 with Passafist producer, writer, guitars, vocals
- Phil Keaggy and Sunday's Child, 1988 Producer, writer, guitars, vocals
- Amy Grant Lead Me On 1988 A&R
- "Dave Perkins" The Innocence, 1987 Exec. producer A&R
- "Don't Look Now… It's the Hallelujah Brothers" 1989 producer, electric & Acoustic guitars, mandolin, vocals
- Out Of The Grey, See Inside 1997 Executive producer
- Russ Taff, Russ Taff 1987 (Grammy Nomination) Executive producer, A&R
- Russ Taff, Medals 1985 (Grammy Nomination) Executive producer, A&R
- The Imperials, Let the Wind Blow 1985, Executivr producer, A&R
- The Imperials, This Year's Model1987 Executive producer, A&R
- Steve Taylor I predict 1990 1987, Executive Producer, A&R
- Steve Taylor I predict 1990, The Video Album 1987, Executive Producer, A&R
- "Now The Truth Can Be Told" 1994- Steve Taylor, guitars, vocals, writer
- The Imperials, Free the Fire 1988, A&R
- Mylon LeFevre, Live Forever; (Live) 1983 Executive producer, A&R
- Mylon LeFevre, Sheep in Wolves Clothing;1985 Executive producer/A&R
- Mylon LeFevre, Crack the Sky; 1987 Executive producer/A&R
- Servant, Swimming in a Human Ocean 1985 Executive Producer, A&R
- Amy Grant, Unguarded 1985 A&R
- Amy Grant, Straight Ahead 1984 A&R
- Amy Grant, A Christmas Album 1983 A&R
- Mylon LeFevre, More; 1983 Executive Producer/A&R
- Amy Grant, Age to Age 1982 marketing promotion
- The Master and the Musician, 1978 instrumental album, co producer
- Emerging, 1977 with the Phil Keaggy Band, guitar, vocals, writer
- Courts of The King 1976 guitars, vocals
- Let the Whole Earth Be Filled 1979 producer, guitars, vocals
- Dust (album) 1971, guitar, vocals
