= Way Back Home (Phil Keaggy album) =

Studio album by Phil Keaggy
- Released: 1986
- Studio: Weddington Studio (North Hollywood, California); Whitefield Studios (Santa Ana, California); Salt Mine Studios and The Dugout (Nashville, Tennessee)
- Genre: Rock; Pop
- Length: 45:19
- Label: Pan Pacific
- Producer: Phil Keaggy

Phil Keaggy chronology
Getting Closer! (1985)	Way Back Home (1986)	The Wind and the Wheat (1987)

Reissue cover

Way Back Home (reissue)

Studio album by Phil Keaggy
- Released: 1994 re-released
- Length: 60:34
- Label: Sparrow

Phil Keaggy chronology
Blue (1994)	Way Back Home (reissue) (1994)	Acoustic Sketches (1995)

Professional ratings
Review scores
Source	Rating
AllMusic	4.5/5 stars

Way Back Home is an album by guitarist Phil Keaggy, released in 1986 on Pan Pacific Records. A heavily revised reissue of the album — with a different cover, a different track order, new songs, one original track omitted, and most other tracks modified — was released in 1994 on Sparrow Records.

== Track listing ==
All songs were written by Phil Keaggy, unless otherwise noted.

=== 1986 version ===
1. "Way Back Home" - 4:19
2. "Here and Now" - 2:44
3. "A New Star" - 3:32
4. "Maker of the Universe" (music by Keaggy, words by F. W. Pitt) - 3:10
5. "Once I Prayed" (music by Keaggy, words by Helen McDowell) - 3:10
6. "Let Everything Else Go" - 5:51 (different than the previously released version on Town to Town album)
7. "Noah's Song" - 4:01
8. "The Reunion"‡ - 5:59 (also released, in a nearly identical version, on The Wind and the Wheat album, the following year)
9. "Olivia" - 3:21
10. "Be in Time" (music by Keaggy, Words by anonymous and Keaggy) - 4:18
11. "In Every Need" (music by Keaggy, Words Samuel Longfellow and anonymous) - 4:54

‡ - does not appear on 1994 version

=== 1994 version ===
1. "Way Back Home" - 4:19
2. "A New Star" - 3:35
3. "Father-Daughter Harmony"† (Alicia and Phil Keaggy) - 4:25
4. "It Could Have Been Me"† (music by Keaggy, Words by Sheila Walsh) - 5:11
5. "In Every Need" (music by Keaggy, words Samuel Longfellow and anonymous) - 4:57
6. "She's a Dancer"† - 2:59
7. "Let Everything Else Go" - 4:54
8. "Olivia" - 3:26
9. "Once I Prayed" (music by Keaggy, words by Helen McDowell) - 3:14
10. "Noah's Song" - 4:01
11. "Maker of the Universe" (music by Keaggy, words by F. W. Pitt) - 3:11
12. "Be in Time" (music by Keaggy, words by anonymous and Keaggy) (4:23)
13. "Here and Now" (2:40)
14. "The 50th"† (music by Keaggy and traditional) - 9:19 (Note: Per the CD notes, this track features excerpts from a 78 RPM recording made on January 6, 1948 at the 50th wedding anniversary celebration of Keaggy's maternal grandparents, the Harryhills. The CD insert includes a photograph taken of them at this occasion. An abridged version of this piece, with the guitar only, is featured on Keaggy's Acoustic Sketches album (1996).)

† - new song

=== Differences in songs between versions ===
Although all but one of the songs from the original 1986 version also appear on the 1994 version, most of them were revised in some way. Keaggy recorded new vocals for the majority of them, and some had changes in the instrumentation.

- "Here and Now" – String sounds from the original version were removed for the 1994 version, and the 1994 version is faded slightly early.
- "A New Star" – 1994 version includes new keyboard sounds and replaces the original soprano sax part with a penny whistle part.
- "Maker of the Universe" – String sounds from the original version were removed for the 1994 version.
- "Let Everything Else Go" – 1994 version is faded out about a minute earlier than the original version.
- "Noah's Song" – String sounds from the original version were removed for the 1994 version.
- "In Every Need" – 1994 version has a brief section with no guitar, only bass.

== Personnel ==
=== 1986 version ===
Musicians

- Phil Keaggy – vocals, acoustic guitars, classical guitar, bass
- David Stone – string bass
- Alex Acuña – drums
- Brad Dutz – percussion
- Jon Clarke – clarinet, soprano saxophone, oboe
- Jim Isaacs – oboe, English horn
- Ian McKinnell – cello (9)
- Tom Howard – string ensemble and woodwind arrangements
- Gail Cruz, Pavel Farkus, Ken Burwood-Hoy, R. F. Peterson and John Walls – strings

Production

- Phil Keaggy – producer, arrangements, mixing
- Bob Cotton – recording, mixing, direction
- Peter Hayden – recording
- Eddie Keaggy – recording, mixing
- Thom Roy – recording
- Rhonda Jesson – graphic design
- Gary Whitlock – cover concept, photography, direction
- Kim Whitlock – photo hand tinting

=== 1994 version ===
Musicians

- Phil Keaggy – vocals, guitars, electric bass, recorders
- Blair Masters – keyboards (3)
- Allan Bradley – acoustic piano (4)
- Danny O'Lannerghty – string bass (4)
- David Stone – string bass (5, 10)
- Alex Acuña – drums (2, 5, 10)
- Ken Lewis – drums (3, 4), percussion (3, 4)
- Brad Dutz – percussion (2, 10)
- Jon Clarke – clarinet (1, 9, 10), soprano saxophone (1, 9, 10), oboe (1, 9, 10)
- Jim Isaacs – oboe (7, 11), English horn (7, 11)
- Ian McKinnell – cello (8)
- Tom Howard – string ensemble and woodwind arrangements
- Gail Cruz, Pavel Farkus, Ken Burwood-Hoy, R. F. Peterson and John Walls – strings
- Alicia Keaggy – vocals (3)
- Olivia Keaggy – additional harmony (3)

Production

- Phil Keaggy – producer, arrangements
- Bob Cotton – engineer (original tracks)
- Peter Hayden – engineer (original tracks)
- Eddie Keaggy – engineer (original tracks)
- Thom Roy – engineer (original tracks)
- Russ Long – engineer, remixing
- Martin Woodlee – second engineer
- Ken Love – mastering at MasterMix (Nashville, Tennessee)
- Karen Philpott – art direction
- Sara Remke – design
- Ben Pearson – photography
