= Can't Buy a Miracle =

Studio album by Randy Stonehill
- Released: 1988
- Studio: Randy's Rock Bunker (Brentwood, Tennessee)
- Genre: Contemporary Christian, folk pop, rock
- Length: 35:39
- Label: Myrrh
- Producer: Dave Perkins

Randy Stonehill chronology
The Wild Frontier (1988)	Can't Buy a Miracle (1988)	Return to Paradise (1989)

Professional ratings
Review scores
Source	Rating
AllMusic	4/5 stars

Can't Buy a Miracle is an album by Randy Stonehill, released in 1988 on Myrrh Records.

== Track listing ==
All songs written by Randy Stonehill and Dave Perkins except where otherwise noted.

=== Side one ===
1. "It's Now" – 4:03
2. "Don't Break Down" (Stonehill) – 3:04
3. "Coming Back Soon" (Stonehill) – 4:46
4. "O How The Mighty Have Fallen" – 4:10
5. "Brighter Day" (Stonehill) – 4:05

=== Side two ===
1. "Awfully Loud World" – 3:02
2. "Cold Rock The Groove" (Randy Stonehill, Dave Perkins, Greg Husted) – 4:05
3. "Beyond The Veil" – 4:55
4. "Can't Buy A Miracle" – 3:49

== The Subterraneans ==
- Randy (Life O'Reilly, Randall the Vandall) Stonehill – vocals, flat top guitars
- Greg (Lord Louie, Greg, Atticus Finch) Husted – keyboards
- Dave (Atilla the Lung, Tweakmeister Rex) Perkins – electric guitars
- Rick (Wrap Around, Magnum Vibrato, How Ya Doin') Cua – bass guitar
- Mike (Mosquito, Twinkie Shrapnel, Monkey Boy) Mead – drums
- Lisa (Lisa Lisa, Lisa Lisa Lisa) Cates – percussion

== Backing vocals ==
- Gary Chapman on "Brighter Day"
- Phil Keaggy on Don't Break Down"
- Rez Band (Glenn and Wendi Kaiser) on "Cold Rock The Groove"
- Russ Taff on "Awfully Loud World"
- Dave (Ronnie) Perkins on "Miracle," "Awfully Loud World"

== Production ==
- Executive Producers – Ray Ware and Tom Willett
- Produced by Dave Perkins
- Recorded at "The Tube" (Reelsound Bus) Somewhere up at tree in Rutland.
- Engineered by Malcolm (Chairman Mal) Harper and Dave Perkins
- Mixed at The Reelsound Truck (Austin, Texas).
- Mixed by Dave Perkins and Malcolm (Malcolm X, Y, Z) Harper
- Additional Engineering – Lynn Fuston and Dave (Flood-master, "don't call me Shirley") Shirley
- Services – Jim and Kim (said so) Thomas
- Art – Ph. D/Michael ("It needs strings - that I do know!") Hodgson
- Photos – Peter Nash
