= Crimson and Blue =

Studio album by Phil Keaggy
- Released: March 1993
- Recorded: Summer 1992; Mixed in Fall 1992
- Studio: The Dugout and Battery Studios (Nashville, Tennessee)
- Genre: Rock
- Length: 1:09:48
- Label: Myrrh
- Producer: Lynn Nichols

Phil Keaggy chronology
| Revelator (1993) | Crimson and Blue (1993) | Blue (1994) |

Professional ratings
Review scores
| Source | Rating |
|---|---|
| AllMusic | 5/5 stars |

Crimson and Blue is the 1993 album by guitarist Phil Keaggy, released on Myrrh Records.

Crimson and Blue found Phil Keaggy surrounded by old friends making new music, in an old Victorian cottage owned by Brown Bannister. The Dugout (now Vibe56) was in the middle of Music Row. Its high ceilings, hardwood floors, and vintage equipment made it a perfect place to record a rock record.

Producer/guitarist Lynn Nichols and organist Phil Madeira had been Keaggy's bandmates in the Phil Keaggy Band in the 1970s. Drummer John Sferra was Keaggy's oldest friend, and partner in the band Glass Harp. Bassist Wade Jaynes was Nichols' bandmate from Chagall Guevara.

== Track listing ==
All songs were written by Phil Keaggy, unless otherwise noted.

1. "Shouts of Joy" (Music by Keaggy, Words by Ray Repp) – 5:54
2. "World of Mine" – 5:38
3. "Everywhere I Look" (Phil Madeira) – 4:26
4. "Love Divine" – 2:23
5. "Reunion of Friends" – 4:11
6. "All There is to Know" (Keaggy/Madeira) – 3:47
7. "When Will I Ever Learn to Live in God" (Van Morrison) – 6:40
8. "Stone Eyes" (Keaggy/Nichols/Madeira) – 7:01
9. "I Will Be There" – 6:51
10. "Don't Pass Me By" (Keaggy/Nichols) – 3:44
11. "John the Revelator" (Traditional) – 8:04
12. "Doin' Nothin'" – 8:25
13. "Nothing But the Blood" (Traditional) – 2:44

== Personnel ==
- Phil Keaggy – lead vocals, guitars, arrangements (11, 13)
- Phil Madeira – keyboards, Hammond B3 organ, backing vocals
- Lynn Nichols – guitars, backing vocals
- Wade Jaynes – bass
- John Sferra – drums

Special guests

- John Mark Painter – Mellotron, trumpet
- Mike Mead – percussion (3), backing vocals (3)
- Ashley Cleveland – vocals (7)
- Jimmy A – backing vocals (11)

=== Production ===
- Mark Maxwell – A&R direction
- Lynn Nichols – producer
- Bill Deaton – engineer mixing
- James "JB" Baird – additional engineer
- Lee Groitzsch – second engineer
- Carry Summers – second engineer
- Martin Woodlee – second engineer
- Doug Sax – mastering
- Gavin Lurssen – mastering assistant
- The Mastering Lab (Hollywood, California) – mastering location
- Diana Barnes – art direction
- Margo Chase – design
- Ben Pearson – band photography
- Michael Wilson – photography
- Proper Management – management
