= Revelator (Phil Keaggy album) =

EP by Phil Keaggy
- Released: March 1993
- Recorded: Summer 1992; The Dugout; Nashville, Tennessee
- Genre: Rock
- Label: Myrrh
- Producer: L. Arthur Nichols

Phil Keaggy chronology
Beyond Nature (1991)	Revelator (1993)	Crimson and Blue (1993)

Revelator is the title of a 1993 EP by guitarist Phil Keaggy, released as a "sneak peek" at his next full-length album, Crimson and Blue.

== Track listing ==
All songs were written by Phil Keaggy, unless otherwise noted.

1. "Everywhere I Look" (Radio Mix) – 3:09 (Phil Madeira)
2. "John the Revelator" (Radio Mix) – 4:58
3. "Doin' Nothin'" (Alternate Take - Swamp Version) – 5:48 / "untitled" – 1:09
4. "John the Revelator" (Extended Strat Mix) – 8:02 / "untitled" – 2:30
5. "The Further Adventures of..." (jam with Glass Harp's John Sferra) – 12:46
6. "Celebrate" (unedited outro to "Reunion of Friends") – 2:14

== Personnel ==
- Phil Keaggy: guitars, lead vocals
- John Sferra: drums
- Wade Jaynes: bass
- Phil Madeira: Hammond B3, keyboards, background vocals
- Lynn Nichols: guitar, background vocals
- Mike Mead: Percussion, background vocals
- Ashley Cleveland: background vocals
- John Mark Painter: Mellotron, trumpet
- Jimmy A: background vocals

== Production notes ==
- Produced by L. Arthur Nichols
- Mixed and engineered by Bill Deaton
- Additional engineering by JB
- Recorded at the Dugout, Nashville, Tennessee
