= Find Me in These Fields =

Find Me In These Fields

Studio album by Phil Keaggy
- Released: June 1990
- Studio: The Bennett House (Franklin, Tennessee); Midtown Tone & Volume, Sixteenth Avenue Sound and Digital Recorders (Nashville, Tennessee)
- Genre: Rock
- Length: 44:17
- Label: Myrrh
- Producer: Lynn Nichols; Phil Keaggy

Phil Keaggy chronology
| Phil Keaggy and Sunday's Child (1988) | Find Me In These Fields (1990) | Beyond Nature (1991) |

Professional ratings
Review scores
| Source | Rating |
|---|---|
| AllMusic | 4.5/5 stars |

Find Me In These Fields is the title of a 1990 album by guitarist Phil Keaggy, released on A&M Records.

== Track listing ==
All songs are by Phil Keaggy, unless otherwise noted.

1. "untitled" – 0:19 (Acoustic instrumental, recorded live direct to disk)
2. "Strong Tower" – 4:14
3. "Carry On" – 3:14
4. "untitled" – 0:39 (Acoustic instrumental, recorded live direct to disk)
5. "When the Wild Winds Blow" – 5:39
6. "This Side of Heaven" – 4:18
7. "Find Me in These Fields" – 3:56
8. "Get over It" – 6:08
9. "Calling You" – 4:17
10. "untitled" – 2:32 (Electric instrumental, recorded live direct to disk)
11. "Gentle and Strong" – 3:37
12. "Final Day" – 3:57
13. "untitled" – 2:08 (Electric instrumental, recorded live direct to disk)
14. "Be in My Heart" (John Perry) – 4:40
15. "untitled" – 1:00 (Electric instrumental, recorded live direct to disk)

== Personnel ==
- Phil Keaggy – guitars, vocals (2, 3, 5–9, 11, 12, 14)
- Phil Madeira – acoustic piano (2, 3, 5–9, 11, 12, 14), Hammond B3 organ (2, 3, 5–9, 11, 12, 14), backing vocals (12, 14)
- Rick Cua – bass (2, 3, 5–9, 11, 12, 14)
- Mike Mead – drums (2, 3, 5–9, 11, 12, 14), percussion (2, 3, 5–9, 11, 12, 14)
- John Catchings – cello (7)
- Sam Bush – fiddle (11)
- David Mullen – backing vocals (2), additional backing vocals (5)
- Radney Foster – backing vocals (5)
- Bill Lloyd – backing vocals (5)
- Lynn Nichols – additional backing vocals (5), backing vocals (11, 12, 14)
- Steve Taylor – backing vocals (11)
- Charlie Peacock – backing vocals (14)
- Elinor Madeira – backing vocals (14)
- Kathy, Bianca, and Damann Nichols – backing vocals (14)
- Bernadette, Alicia, Olivia, and Ian Keaggy – backing vocals (14)

=== Production ===
- Mark Maxwell – A&R direction
- Phil Keaggy – producer
- Lynn Nichols – producer
- James "JB" Baird – recording, mixing
- Roy Gamble – recording assistant
- Shawn McLean – recording assistant
- Graham Lewis – mix assistant
- John David Parker – mix assistant
- Ken Love – digital editing at MasterMix (Nashville, Tennessee)
- Howie Weinberg – mastering at Masterdisk (New York City, New York)
- Bradley Goose – art direction, design, illustration
- Roz Roos – associate art director
- Ben Pearson – photography
- Michael Tyler – hair, make-up
- Proper Management – management
