= Chagall Guevara (album) =

1991 studio album by Chagall Guevara

Studio album by Chagall Guevara
- Released: 1991
- Studios: The Bennett House, Franklin, Tennessee
- Genre: Rock
- Label: MCA
- Producers: Matt Wallace, Chagall Guevara

Professional ratings
Review scores
Source	Rating
AllMusic	4/5 stars
Rolling Stone	4/5 stars

Chagall Guevara is the title of the debut full-length album by the band Chagall Guevara, released in 1991, on MCA Records.

== Track listing ==
All songs written by Nichols, Perkins and Taylor.

1. "Murder In The Big House"
2. "Escher's World"
3. "Play God"
4. "Monkey Grinder"
5. "Can't You Feel The Chains?"
6. "Violent Blue"
7. "Love Is A Dead Language"
8. "Take Me Back To Love Canal"
9. "The Wrong George"
10. "Candy Guru"
11. "I Need Somebody"
12. "The Rub Of Love"
13. "If It All Comes True"

== Personnel ==
- Steve Taylor – lead vocals (except 9, 13), backing vocals (13)
- Dave Perkins – guitars, backing vocals, lead vocals (2, 13)
- L. Arthur Nichols – guitars, backing vocals
- Wade Jaynes – bass guitar
- Mike Mead – drums

Additional musicians

- The Blind Willy Boner Brass, featuring Reno Caruso on trumpet, Waco Caruso on Harmonica and Junior on Trombone – Horns on "Play God"
- Matt Wallace – producer
- Chagall Gueavara – producer
- David Bryson – engineer, mixing
- Mike Corbett – assistant engineer
- Roy Gamble – assistant engineer
- Shawn McLean – assistant engineer
- Ulrich Wild – assistant engineer
- The Bennett House, Franklin, Tennessee - recording location
- The Tube at Dave's house - additional recording location
- Matt Wallace - mixing
- David Bryson - mixing
- Alpha & Omega, San Francisco, California - mixing location
- Bob Ludwig - mastering
- Masterdisc, New York City - mastering location
- Tim Stedman for Public Eye L.A. - art direction and design
- Michael Lavine - photography
