= Blue (Phil Keaggy album) =

Crimson and Blue

Studio album by Phil Keaggy
- Released: March 1994
- Recorded: Mid-1992
- Studio: The Dugout, The Boardroom and Battery Studios (Nashville, Tennessee); The Bennett House (Franklin, Tennessee)
- Genre: Rock
- Length: 1:05:41
- Label: Epic
- Producer: Lynn Nichols; Phil Keaggy

Phil Keaggy chronology
| Crimson and Blue (1993) | Crimson and Blue (1994) | True Believer (1995) |

Blue is a 1994 album by American guitarist Phil Keaggy, released on Epic Records. Blue was released in the mainstream market simultaneously with Keaggy's album, Crimson and Blue, which was geared to the Christian market. The most significant differences are the inclusion of three different songs (Keaggy's cover of the Badfinger song, "Baby Blue"; "All Our Wishes"; and "The Further Adventures of..." from the Revelator EP) and the exclusion of five songs from Crimson and Blue ("Love Divine," "Reunion Of Friends," "Stone Eyes," "I Will Be There," and "Nothing But The Blood.") In addition, several of the tracks on Blue are reworked.

== Track listing ==
All songs were written by Phil Keaggy, unless otherwise noted.

1. "Doin' Nothin'" – 7:35 (shorter than the Crimson and Blue version)
2. "Don't Pass Me By" (Keaggy/Nichols) – 3:47
3. "Baby Blue" (Pete Ham) – 5:37
4. "All There Is to Know" (Keaggy/Madeira) – 3:49
5. "John the Revelator" (traditional) – 8:02
6. "World of Mine" – 4:30 (shorter than the Crimson and Blue version)
7. "Everywhere I Look" (Phil Madeira) – 3:53 (shorter than the Crimson and Blue version)
8. "The Further Adventures of..." (jam with Glass Harp's John Sferra) – 12:37
9. "All Our Wishes" – 3:22
10. "When Will I Ever Learn to Live in God" (Van Morrison) – 6:39
11. "Shouts of Joy" (music by Keaggy, words by Ray Repp) – 5:54

== Personnel ==
- Phil Keaggy – lead vocals, guitars
- Phil Madeira – keyboards, Hammond B3 organ, backing vocals
- Lynn Nichols – guitars, backing vocals, rhythm guitar (5)
- Wade Jaynes – bass
- John Sferra – drums

Special guests

- John Mark Painter – Mellotron, trumpet
- Mike Mead – percussion (7), backing vocals (7)
- Jimmy A – backing vocals (5)
- Bernadette Keaggy – backing vocals (9)
- Alicia Keaggy – backing vocals (9)
- Olivia Keaggy – backing vocals (9)
- Ashley Cleveland – vocals (10)

=== Production ===
- Mark Maxwell – A&R direction
- Lynn Nichols – producer
- Phil Keaggy – producer (9)
- Bill Deaton – engineer (1, 2, 4–10), mixing (1, 2, 4–9)
- Richie Biggs – engineer (3), mixing (3)
- James "JB" Baird – additional engineer, mixing (10)
- Lee Groitzsch – second engineer
- Greg Parker – second engineer
- Carry Summers – second engineer
- Martin Woodlee – second engineer
- Ken Love – mastering at MasterMix (Nashville, Tennessee)
- Diana Barnes – art direction
- Margo Chase – design
- Ben Pearson – band photography
- Michael Wilson – photography
- Proper Management – management
