= Phil Keaggy and Sunday's Child =

Studio album by Phil Keaggy
- Released: October 1988
- Studio: Music Grinder Studios (Hollywood, California); Schnee Studios (North Hollywood, California; Neverland Studios (Cerritos, California); Fingerprint Recorders (Montrose, California); The Hop (Sherman Oaks, California)
- Genre: Rock
- Length: 52:13
- Label: Myrrh, A&M
- Producer: Lynn Nichols

Phil Keaggy chronology
The Wind and the Wheat (1987)	Phil Keaggy and Sunday's Child (1988)	Find Me In These Fields (1990)

Professional ratings
Review scores
Source	Rating
Allmusic	5/5 stars

Phil Keaggy and Sunday's Child is the title of a 1988 album by guitarist Phil Keaggy, released on Myrrh Records and A&M Records simultaneously.

The record, which includes an all-star list of guest musicians and vocalists, is in many ways a tribute to 1960s pop/rock music like The Byrds, The Beatles, and others.

The album's sound quality, which came from the use of vintage instruments and production techniques, was unique by 1988's standards. Among the vintage instruments used was Ringo Starr's drum kit, per the album's liner notes ("SPECIAL THANKS...to the DRUM DOCTOR for the use of Ringo's old drum kit").

== Track listing ==
1. "Tell Me How You Feel" (Phil Keaggy) – 3:21
2. "Sunday's Child" (Randy Stonehill, Phil Keaggy) – 3:57
3. "I Always Do" (Mark Heard) – 4:50
4. "I'm Gonna Get You Now" (Phil Keaggy, Lynn Nichols) – 3:47
5. "Blessed Be the Ties" (Lynn Nichols, Phil Keaggy, Steve Taylor) – 3:56
6. "This Could Be the Moment" (Angelo Palladino, Lynn Nichols) – 3:48
7. "Ain't Got No" (Randy and Sandi Stonehill) – 3:29
8. "Somebody Loves You" (Phil Keaggy) – 4:05
9. "Big Eraser" (Lynn Nichols, Lance Demers, Phil Keaggy) – 4:33
10. "Everything Is Alright" (Mark Heard) (omitted from vinyl version) – 5:00
11. "I've Just Begun (Again)" (Phil Keaggy, Lynn Nichols) – 3:00
12. "Walk in Two Worlds" (Randy Stonehill, Phil Keaggy) – 3:37
13. "Talk About Suffering" (Traditional: Arranged by Phil Keaggy) – 4:50

== Personnel ==
- Phil Keaggy – guitars (1–5, 7–13), backing vocals (1, 6–9, 11–13), bass (1, 3, 5), handclaps (1), vocals (2–5), first guitar solo (6), lead vocals (7)
- Robbie Buchanan – Hammond B3 organ (3, 6, 7, 12)
- James Hollihan – guitars (1–5, 7–13), second guitar solo (6)
- Randy Stonehill – guitars (2), lead vocals (2, 7), backing vocals (7)
- Mark Heard – guitars (3), backing vocals (6, 8, 13), keyboards (10)
- Lynn Nichols – guitars (5), backing vocals (7, 9, 11, 12)
- Rick Cua – bass (2, 4, 6–13)
- Mike Mead – drums
- Lenny Castro – percussion (1, 2, 5–10, 12, 13), handclaps (1)
- Steve Taylor – handclaps (1)
- Rudy Valentine – megaphone (4)
- Jimmie Lee Sloas – backing vocals (6, 13)
- Russ Taff – lead vocals (7), backing vocals (7, 12)
- Alwyn Wall – backing vocals (8)
- Derri Daugherty – backing vocals (9, 11)

=== Production ===
- Lynn Arthur Nichols – producer
- Jack Joseph Puig – director of recording, mixing
- David Schober – overdub engineer
- Mark Heard – additional engineer
- Brian Tankersley – additional engineer
- Dave Hackbarth – mix assistant
- Wade Jaynes – mix assistant
- Eddie Keaggy – mix assistant
- KC McMackin – mix assistant
- Bart Stevens – mix assistant
- Deb Rhodes – A&R coordinator
- Laurie Fink – production manager
- Ph. D – art direction, design
- Dan Arsenault – photography
- Ben Pearson – additional photography
- Scott Parker – grooming
- Maria Sarno – styling
- Proper Management – management
