= Chagall Guevara =

American rock band

- Chagall Guevara c. 1991

Background information
- Origin: Nashville, Tennessee, United States
- Genres: Rock, alternative rock
- Years active: 1989–1993, 2020–current
- Label: MCA
- Members: Steve Taylor; Dave Perkins; Lynn Nichols; Mike Mead; John Mark Painter (reunion shows)
- Past members: Wade Jaynes

Chagall Guevara is an American rock band formed in 1989 by solo artist Steve Taylor, guitarists Dave Perkins and Lynn Nichols (from the 1970s Phil Keaggy band), bassist Wade Jaynes, and drummer Mike Mead.

The band was named after the avant-garde painter Marc Chagall and the Communist revolutionary Che Guevara, to convey a suggestion of "revolutionary art". All of the band members had performed contemporary Christian music, and their new band was an effort to depart from that genre. Despite this, the band still performed at the exclusively Christian music festival Cornerstone, and had their music (albeit against their wishes) distributed through Christian bookstores. The group formed in 1989 and broke up in early 1993.

A Kickstarter drive appeared in August 2020 to release unavailable and rare live and studio material, resulting in the release of two new albums.

Following the successful Kickstarter campaign, the band performed its first live show in 30 years on July 2, 2022 at Ryman Auditorium in Nashville, TN.

== Background ==
The band was originally formed by Taylor, Nichols, Perkins, Mead and Daniel Amos bassist, Tim Chandler - although Chandler quit during rehearsals and was later replaced by Rick Cua who played bass on the band's first recorded track, "'Tale O' The Twister'" and later, Wade Jaynes who recorded with the band for their first album.

The band first appeared on the soundtrack to the motion picture Pump Up the Volume with a song called '"Tale O' The Twister". The band's only album, the self-titled Chagall Guevara, was released on MCA Records in 1991. The band's only music video, for the song "Violent Blue", received a few plays on MTV.

Several CD and LP singles were released off the album, including a UK release of "Violent Blue" with an unreleased B-side track titled "Still Know Your Number By Heart". Several songs from the band's 1991 performance at the Greenbelt Festival in England appeared on the official video "Four Days in Summer."

Work on a second album began, but the group broke up while attempting to be released from their contract with MCA Records. Several tracks for the second album were recorded, including "Halcyon Days" and "A Bullet's Worth A Thousand Words".

In 1994, a track titled "Treasure of the Broken Land" appeared on the Mark Heard tribute album Strong Hand of Love and the Orphans of God double-CD, which were sold mainly through Christian bookstores and similar outlets. The band reunited again in Nashville at a private industry party in October, 2005.

In November 2014 the band partially reunited (with John Mark Painter standing in for Wade Jaynes on bass) at the Cannery Ballroom in Nashville at the end of a set by Steve Taylor & The Perfect Foil.

On August 1, 2020, a live Kickstarter appeared to release the band's November 15, 1991 concert, entitled The Last Amen. The album would also be accompanied by a collection entitled Halcyon Days, to include rare and previously unreleased studio material as well as three new recordings.

On February 12, 2022, the band announced that bassist Wade Jaynes was leaving the band. He would be replaced by John Mark Painter again. The nine-track Halcyon Days was made available to Kickstarter backers in mid-May 2022, with a public release date set for June.

== Discography ==
- Pump Up the Volume soundtrack, 1990.
- Chagall Guevara, 1991.
- Strong Hand of Love, a tribute to Mark Heard, 1994.
- Orphans of God, a tribute to Mark Heard, 1996.
- The Last Amen, live album, 2021.
- Halcyon Days, 2022.
