= Strings Attached =

1999 novel by Gay Walley

- Author: Gay Walley
- Genre: Novel
- Publisher: University Press of Mississippi
- Publication date: November 1, 1999
- Pages: 197
- ISBN: 1-57806-199-7
- OCLC: 41284968

Strings Attached is a 1999 novel by Gay Walley. It is the author's first novel. It was published by University Press of Mississippi. The book was a finalist for the Pirate's Alley Faulkner Prize.

== Reception ==
The New York Times Book Review said the book's non-linear narrative "offers possibilities for the evocation of a ravaged psyche, yet in this novel the result is an almost complete lack of narrative tension. The sequencing reflects neither chronology nor emotional logic". Library Journal said it possessed "memorable style and strong character development [that] weave a heartfelt story that will be remembered by all readers". Booklist said it is a "curious book to read – satisfying, certainly, for the evocative quality of the writing but unsatisfying in what is left out of the story. However, this book is well worth reading".

Publishers Weekly found it "heavy-handed" whereas Kirkus Reviews said it was "intelligent and uncommonly sensitive".
