= Dream Again (Phil Keaggy album) =

Studio album by Phil Keaggy
- Released: October 15, 2006
- Genres: CCM, acoustic
- Length: 45:53
- Label: Strobie
- Producers: Phil Keaggy and JB

Phil Keaggy chronology
Two of Us (2006)	Dream Again (2006)	Acoustic Cafe (2007)

Professional ratings
Review scores
Source	Rating
Jesus Freak Hideout	3.5/5 stars
Christianity Today	3/5 stars

Dream Again is an album by guitarist Phil Keaggy, released in 2006. His first new studio vocal album since the 2000 release of Lights of Madrid, Keaggy described it as a "relationship album." It contains songs dedicated to his older sisters ("Kathy's Song" and "How Can I Thank You"), his wife Bernadette ("It's You and Me"), and his daughter Olivia ("There With You"), as well as other personal references. Additionally, his son Ian adds acoustic guitar and vocals and his daughter Alicia performs vocals on "Micah 6:8". "Traveling Light" is an instrumental.

== Track listing ==
1. "Dream Again"
2. "Why"
3. "Redemption"
4. "Thank You for Today"
5. "Revive Me"
6. "There With You"
7. "Traveling Light"
8. "Micah 6:8"
9. "Kathy's Song"
10. "It's You and Me"
11. "How Can I Thank You"
12. "Love is the Reason"

== Personnel ==
- Phil Keaggy - vocals, producer, instrumentation
- Ian Keaggy - acoustic guitar, vocals
- Alicia Keaggy - vocals
- Tom Howard - piano
- Chris McHugh - drums
- Mike Radovosky - drums
- Tom Shinness - bass, cello, harmonium, tambourine, backing vocals
- Jonathon Willis - string arrangements
- Richard Dodd - mastering
- Loren Balman - photography, cover photo
