= The Wind and the Wheat =

Studio album by Phil Keaggy
- Released: January 1987
- Studio: Whitefield Studios (Santa Ana, California); Bill Schnee Studios (North Hollywood, California); Music Merchants (Costa Mesa, California)
- Genre: Christian, new-age, instrumental
- Length: 50:20
- Label: Colours, A&M
- Producer: Phil Keaggy; Jeff Lams; Tommy Coones

Phil Keaggy chronology
Way Back Home (1987)	The Wind and the Wheat (1987)	Phil Keaggy and Sunday's Child (1988)

Professional ratings
Review scores
Source	Rating
AllMusic	3/5 stars

The Wind and the Wheat is the title of a 1987 instrumental album by guitarist Phil Keaggy, released on Maranatha! Music's Colours imprint. The album won the 1988 GMA Dove Award for Instrumental Album of the Year. It was remastered and re-issued in 2013.

== Track listing ==
All songs were written by Phil Keaggy, unless otherwise noted.

=== Side one ===
1. "March of the Clouds" – 5:25
2. "Paradise Dream" – 5:32
3. "The Wind and the Wheat" – 4:32
4. "Where Travelers Meet" – 6:32
5. "From Shore to Shore" – 3:02

=== Side two ===
1. "Prayer" – 4:21
2. "The Mission" – 4:58
3. "The Promise" – 4:30
4. "The Reunion" (Note: This is an almost identical rerecording of a track from Keaggy's previous album Way Back Home.) – 6:00
5. "I Love You Lord" (Laurie Klein) – 5:28

== Personnel ==
- Phil Keaggy – acoustic guitar (1–5, 7–10), electric guitar (1–4, 6–8, 10), bass (4, 5, 8), keyboards (5), electric mini-guitar (5) percussion (5)
- Jeff Lams – keyboards (1, 3, 8), arrangements (1), acoustic piano (4), synthesizers (4, 6)
- Brian Curtin – synthesizer overdubs (1, 2)
- Harlan Rogers – Fender Rhodes (2), arrangements (2, 6), acoustic piano (6)
- Smitty Price – synthesizers (2, 6)
- Cheri Anderson – synthesizers (7)
- Dave Coy – bass (1, 2, 6), fretless bass (1, 3)
- Alex Acuña – drums (1, 3), percussion (1, 3, 6, 8)
- Ron Tutt – drums (2, 6)
- Dave Spurr – drums (8)
- Alex MacDougall – percussion (3, 4)

== Production ==
- Tommy Coomes – executive producer, producer (2, 3, 6), mixing (2–10)
- Phil Keaggy – producer, arrangements, mixing, engineer (8), liner notes
- Jeff Lams – producer (1, 4), engineer (8)
- Jim Scheffler – engineer (1–6, 8), mixing (1–8)
- Eddie Keaggy – engineer (1, 2, 7, 9), mixing (9)
- Chris Taylor – engineer (1, 3, 7, 8), mixing (10)
- Thom Roy – mixing (9)
- Bruce Botnick – CD mastering at Digital Magnetics (Hollywood, California)
- Alex MacDougall – art direction
- Gary DeLacy – cover design, typography
- Steve Bjorkman – cover artwork
- Phil Fewsmith – photography
