= Roundabout (album) =

Live album by Phil Keaggy
- Released: July 2006
- Genre: instrumental, acoustic
- Length: 50:05
- Label: Strobie
- Producer: Phil Keaggy

Phil Keaggy chronology
Jammed! (2006)	Roundabout (2006)	Two of Us (2006)

Professional ratings
Review scores
Source	Rating
Jesus Freak Hideout	3/5 stars
Christianity Today	3/5 stars

Roundabout is an acoustic instrumental album by the guitarist Phil Keaggy, released in July 2006. The songs were compiled from sound check loops of guitar improvisations recorded before his concerts.

== Track listing ==
1. "Skippin' Stones"
2. "Blue Moon"
3. "Is It Going"
4. "Cayenne Loop"
5. "2nd Avenue"
6. "South of the Boredom"
7. "Happy Feet"
8. "J-Loop"
9. "Loop Frog"
10. "Cousin Nit"
11. "Loop a Loola"
12. "Steel Engine"
13. "Troops"
14. "Helix the Cat"
15. "Hoopy"
16. "Zooloop"
17. "Last Mile"
18. "Merry Go Round"

== Personnel ==
- Produced, edited and mixed by Phil Keaggy
- Recorded by Brian Persall except track 3 recorded by Phil Keaggy
- Mastered by Anthony "Ziggy" Johnson
