= Emerging =

Studio album by Phil Keaggy
- Released: 1977
- Label: NewSong
- Producer: Peter K. Hopper with Phil Keaggy

Phil Keaggy chronology
| Love Broke Thru (1976) | Emerging (1977) | The Master and the Musician (1978) |

2000 re-release cover art
- The 2000 re-release was re-titled ReEmerging.

Emerging is the title of the only album by the Phil Keaggy Band, released in 1977 on NewSong Records. The album's release was delayed due to a shift in record pressing plant priorities following the death of Elvis Presley. The album was re-released on CD in 2000 as ReEmerging with one original track omitted and four newly recorded songs by the band members.

== Track listing (1977 release) ==
All songs written by Phil Keaggy, unless otherwise noted.

Side one

1. "Theme" (Phil Madeira) – 1:25 (instrumental)
2. "Where Is My Maker?" – 2:25
3. "Another Try" – 4:55
4. "Ryan's Song" (inspired by a poem by Bill Clarke) – 3:09
5. "Struck By the Love" (Madeira) – 5:43 (lead vocal: Phil Madeira)

Side two

1. "Turned On the Light" – 4:57
2. "Sorry" – 4:09
3. "Take a Look Around" – 5:16
4. "Gentle Eyes" – 5:29 (omitted from 2000 reissue)

== Track listing (2000 re-release) ==
All songs written by Phil Keaggy, unless otherwise noted.

1. "Theme" (Madeira)
2. "Where Is My Maker?"
3. "Another Try"
4. "Ryan's Song"
5. "Struck By the Love" (Madeira)
6. "Turned On the Light"
7. "Sorry"
8. "Take a Look Around"
9. "My Auburn Lady" – 4:26
10. "Mighty Lord" (Madeira) – 4:43 (lead vocal: Phil Madeira)
11. "You're My Hero" (Andersen/Keaggy) – 4:04 (lead vocal: Terry Andersen)
12. "Amelia Earhart's Last Flight" (McEnery) – 3:17 (lead vocal: Dan Cunningham)

== Personnel ==
The Phil Keaggy Band

- Phil Keaggy – vocals, lead electric and acoustic guitar
- Lynn Nichols – vocals, electric guitar, acoustic guitar (lead on "Struck by the Love"), classical guitar
- Phil Madeira – vocals, piano, Hammond organ, Fender Rhodes, Micromoog and Polymoog synths
- Dan Cunningham – bass, vocals (CD reissue only)
- Terry Andersen – drums, vocals (CD reissue only)

Additional musicians

- Karl Fruh – Cello on "Another Try"
- Ray Papai – Sax on "Sorry"

Production notes

- Peter K. Hopper – producer
- Phil Keaggy – co-producer
- Gary Hedden – engineer, mixing
