= The Master and the Musician =

Studio album by Phil Keaggy
- Released: 1978
- Recorded: June–August 1978
- Studio: Hedden West Studio, Schaumburg, Illinois
- Genre: Instrumental music, Christian music
- Label: NewSong
- Producer: Phil Keaggy

Phil Keaggy chronology
| Emerging (1977) | The Master and the Musician (1978) | Ph'lip Side (1980) |

Professional ratings
Review scores
| Source | Rating |
|---|---|
| AllMusic | 4.5/5 stars |

The Master and the Musician is the title of the first entirely instrumental album by guitarist Phil Keaggy, released in 1978, on NewSong Records. It was later reissued, with a bonus track, on Myrrh Records in 1989.

== Track listing ==
All songs written by Phil Keaggy, except "Amazing Grace."

=== Side one ===
1. "Pilgrim's Flight" – 2:22
2. "Agora (The Marketplace)" – 3:26
3. "The Castle's Call" – 0:47
4. "Wedding in the Country Manor" – 3:20
5. "Suite of Reflections" – 5:45
6. "Golden Halls" – 5:13
7. "Mouthpiece" – 1:18
8. "Follow Me Up" – 4:05
9. "Jungle Pleasures" – 0:55
10. "Deep Calls Unto Deep" – 3:52
11. "Medley: Evensong / Twighlight / Forever Joy" – 7:05
12. "The High and Exalted One" – 1:48
13. "Epilogue / Amazing Grace" (bonus track on 1989 reissue) – 8:56

== Personnel ==
- Phil Keaggy: classic, electric, and Ebow guitars, bass, ARP bass synthesizer, drums and percussion, voices
- Bernadette Keaggy: voices
- Tom Baker: bass on "Agora (The Marketplace)"
- Nick Kircher: recorders and oboe on "Deep Calls Unto Deep"
- Philip Kimbrough: recorders on "Medley"
- Peter Pfiefer: percussion on "Epilogue"
- Jim Issacs: oboe on "Epilogue"
- Terry Fryer: keyboards on "Agora", "Suite", "Golden Halls", and "The High and Exalted One"
- Susan Kircher: flute on "The Castle's Call", and "Wedding in the Country Manor"

== Production notes ==
- Produced and arranged by Phil Keaggy
- Engineered by Mal Davis and Garry Hedden
- Recorded June–August 1978 at Hedden West Studio, Schaumburg, Illinois
