= Love Broke Thru =

Studio album by Phil Keaggy
- Released: 1976
- Recorded: October 1976
- Studio: Sunwest Studios, Hollywood, California, Frog Shoes, Burbank, California
- Label: New Song, Myrrh
- Producer: Phil Keaggy

Phil Keaggy chronology
What a Day (1973)	Love Broke Thru (1976)	Emerging (1977)

Professional ratings
Review scores
Source	Rating
AllMusic	link

Love Broke Thru is the title of the second solo album by Phil Keaggy released October 1976, on New Song Productions.

This album was listed as No. 64 in the 2001 book, CCM Presents: The 100 Greatest Albums in Christian Music.

== Track listing ==
Side one

1. "Your Love Broke Through" – 3:31 (Keith Green, Todd Fishkind, Randy Stonehill)
2. "Take Me Closer" – 4:56 (Keaggy)
3. "As the Ruin Falls" – 4:32 (Keaggy, words from poem by C.S. Lewis)
4. "Wild Horse" – 4:16 (Keaggy)
5. "Disappointment" – 2:38 (Keaggy, words from poem by Laura Sophia Soole) (Note: The poem whose words are used as this song's lyrics, "Disappointment - His Appointment," is commonly misattributed to Edith Lillian Young, and the credits of Love Broke Thru reflect this misattribution. However, the poem was actually first published by Laura Sophia Soole in 1893. It originally included a 5th stanza that was omitted when Young republished the poem as her own work, and is not heard in this song. The poem is also sometimes credited to other authors or said to be "anonymous.")

Side two

1. "Time" – 6:47 (Keaggy)
2. "Portrait" – 2:04 (Keaggy, words from poem by Beatrice Clelland)
3. "Just the Same" – 3:43 (Keaggy, Buck Herring)
4. "Things I Will Do" – 3:15 (Keaggy)
5. "Abraham" – 3:33 (Annie Herring, B.Herring)

== Personnel ==
- Phil Keaggy: Guitars, vocals
- Larry Knechtel: Piano, Fender Rhodes, Organ
- Leland Sklar: Bass
- Jim Gordon: Drums
- Don Menza: Flute
- Michael Omartian: Aarpvark
- Marshall Cyr & Bill Baker: Horns
- Phil Keaggy, Peter Hopper, Anne Herring: Percussion
- Mylon LeFevre, Matthew Ward, Anne Herring: Background vocals
- Michael Omartian: String Arrangements
- George Poole: String Contractor

== Production notes ==
- Produced and engineered by Buck Herring
- Executive producer: Scott Ross
- Recorded at Sunwest Studios, Hollywood, CA and Frog Shoes, Burbank, CA
