= Ph'lip Side =

- LP cover, labeled "This Side"

Studio album by Phil Keaggy
- Released: August 1980
- Studio: Sound Labs, Hollywood, California; Martinsound Studios, Alhambra, California; Sound City Studios, Van Nuys, California; Smoketree Studios, Catsworth, California
- Label: Sparrow
- Producer: Dan Collins, Phil Keaggy

Phil Keaggy chronology
The Master and the Musician (1978)	Ph'lip Side (1980)	Town to Town (1981)

Reverse of album
- Reverse of LP cover, labeled "That Side"

Professional ratings
Review scores
Source	Rating
AllMusic	3/5 stars

Ph'lip Side is an album by guitarist Phil Keaggy, released in 1980 on Sparrow Records. To date, it is the only Phil Keaggy release to feature a double-sided cover image, in order to visually convey the "acoustic" and "electric" sides of the album. Corresponding song tracks are listed alongside each image.

== Track listing ==
All songs written by Phil Keaggy, unless otherwise noted.

This side (acoustic)

1. "A Child (In Everyone's Heart)" – 4:01
2. "Little Ones" – 4:58
3. "Spend My Life With You" – 5:16
4. "Just a Moment Away" (Keaggy, Doug Pinnick) – 4:04
5. "I Belong to You" – 3:27

That side (electric)

1. "A Royal Commandment" – 5:46
2. "Sunday School" – 4:34
3. "Send Out Your Light" (Keaggy, Ted Sandquist) – 3.:28
4. "Pulling Down" (Keaggy, Greg X. Volz) – 5:26

All tracks are written by Phil Keaggy, except where noted.

Reissue (1982)
No.	Title	Writer(s)	Length
1.	"A Child (In Everyone's Heart)"		3:55
2.	"Little Ones"		4:27
3.	"Spend My Life With You"		4:13
4.	"I Belong to You"		4:10
5.	"In Your Keep"	Keaggy, Volz	3:28
6.	"Just a Moment Away"	Keaggy, Pinnick	4:00
7.	"Sunday School"		4:32
8.	"A Royal Commandment"		5:46
9.	"Pulling Down"	Keaggy, Volz	5:28

Note: The 1980 release use the above track order. The 1982 reissue, and subsequent CD release, removes "Send Out Your Light" and adds "In Your Keep" and shuffles the track order.

== Personnel ==
- Phil Keaggy – acoustic and electric guitars, vocals
- Richard Souther – piano, Rhodes, and synthesizers
- Leon Gaer – electric synthesized bass
- Leland Sklar – bass on "Send Out Your Light"
- Paul Leim – drums
- Jim Gordon – drums on "Send Out Your Light"
- Alex Acuña – percussion
- Dan Collins – background vocals
- Greg X. Volz – background vocals
- Jamie Owens-Collins – background vocals
- Mylon LeFevre – background vocals on "Send Out Your Light"
- Matthew Ward – background vocals on "Send Out Your Light"

== Production notes ==
- Produced by Dan Collins and Phil Keaggy
- Engineered by Jack Joseph Puig
- Recorded at Sound Labs, Hollywood, California, Martinsound Studios, Alhambra, California, Sound City Studios, Van Nuys, California, Smoketree Studios, Chatsworth, California
- Mixed at Sound Labs, Hollywood, California
- Mastered at Mastering Labs, Hollywood, California
