= What a Day =

Studio album by Phil Keaggy
- Released: June 1973
- Genre: Jesus music
- Label: New Song
- Producer: Phil Keaggy

Phil Keaggy chronology
| It Makes Me Glad (1972) | What a Day (1973) | Love Broke Thru (1976) |

What a Day is the title of the first solo album by Phil Keaggy, originally released in 1973, on New Song Records. It was later reissued on vinyl by Nissi Records and then on CD by Myrrh Records together with Keaggy's second solo album, Love Broke Thru.

== Track listing ==
All songs written by Phil Keaggy except where noted.

Side one
| No. | Title | Length |
|---|---|---|
| 1. | "That Is What the Lord Will Do for You" | 2:54 |
| 2. | "King of the Jews" | 2:05 |
| 3. | "Walking With Our Lord" | 4:17 |
| 4. | "A Time and a Place" (lyrics to bridge: Traditional) | 2:44 |
| 5. | "Rejoice" | 4:44 |

Side two
| No. | Title | Length |
|---|---|---|
| 1. | "What a Day" | 4:49 |
| 2. | "Now I Can See" | 5:09 |
| 3. | "Behold All Things Become New" | 1:18 |
| 4. | "Hallelujah" | 4:43 |
| 5. | "I Will Sing" | 3:27 |

== Personnel ==
- Phil Keaggy – all instruments and vocals, producer, arranger

Production notes

- Gary Hedden – co-producer, engineer
