= Two of Us (Phil Keaggy and Mike Pachelli album) =

Two of Us (Groovemasters Vol. 10)

Studio album by Phil Keaggy
- Released: October 3, 2006
- Genre: Instrumental, acoustic
- Length: 55:02
- Label: Solid Air Records
- Producer: Phil Keaggy & Mike Pachelli

Phil Keaggy chronology
Roundabout (2006)	Two of Us (Groovemasters Vol. 10) (2006)	Dream Again (2006)

Professional ratings
Review scores
Source	Rating
Minor 7th	

Two of Us is the title of the tenth volume in Solid Air Records' "Groovemasters" series. It was recorded by guitarist Phil Keaggy and Mike Pachelli, released in 2006.

== Track listing ==
1. "Maccadocious"
2. "Bears Den Road"
3. "Westside Talkin'"
4. "Birds"
5. "Remember When"
6. "Beatified"
7. "For John & Val"
8. "Old Friends"
9. "County Down Revisited"
10. "Song of the Woods"
11. "Self Duet"
12. "Baggend"
13. "The Walk"

== Personnel ==
- Phil Keaggy - Guitars
- Mike Pachelli - Guitars

== Production notes ==
- James Jensen - Executive Producer
- Bill Wolf - Mastering
