= Beyond Nature =

Studio album by Phil Keaggy
- Released: June 1991
- Studios: Digital Recorders, Recording Arts and Javelina Recording Studios (Nashville, Tennessee)
- Genre: Rock
- Length: 1:00:05
- Label: Myrrh
- Producers: Phil Keaggy; JB

Phil Keaggy chronology
Find Me In These Fields (1990)	Beyond Nature (1991)	Revelator (1993)

Professional ratings
Review scores
Source	Rating
AllMusic	4/5 stars

Beyond Nature is the 1991 instrumental album by guitarist Phil Keaggy.

== Track listing ==
All songs were written by Phil Keaggy, unless otherwise noted.

1. "In the Light of Common Day" – 3:52
2. "County Down" – 5:44
3. "Symphonic Dance (Grieg, Op. 64)" (Edvard Grieg / Arranged by Keaggy) – 5:44
4. "Addison's Walk" – 4:04
5. "I Feel the Winds of God Today" (Traditional) – 4:48
6. "Fare Thee Well" – 5:42
7. "Fragile Forest" – 4:24
8. "Brother Jack" – 4:54
9. "As Warm as Tears" – 6:05
10. "A Place of Springs" – 6:29
11. "In the Light of Common Day (Reprise)" – 4:11
12. "When Night Falls" – 4:08

== Personnel ==
- Phil Keaggy – guitars
- Farrell Morris – percussion (6, 8, 11)
- Marianne Osiel – oboe (4)
- Sam Levine – recorder (5), woodwinds (6, 11), alto flute (8), bass flute (8)
- Dennis Good – trombone (11)
- Mike Haynes – trumpet (11)
- George Tidwell – trumpet (11)
- Ralph Childs – tuba (11)
- Eberhard Ramm – French horn (11)
- Stuart Duncan – fiddle (2)
- John Catchings – cello (2, 6, 11)
- Kristin Wilkinson – viola (11)
- David Davidson – violin (6, 11)
- Chris Teal – violin (6, 11)

=== Production ===
- Mark Maxwell – A&R direction
- Phil Keaggy – producer, arrangements
- James "JB" Baird – co-producer, recording, mixing
- Hank Williams – mastering at MasterMix (Nashville, Tennessee)
- Bill Brunt – art direction, design
- Roz Roos – associate art director
- Ben Pearson – photography
- Proper Management – management
