= Town to Town =

1981 album by guitarist Phil Keaggy

Studio album by Phil Keaggy
- Released: October 1981
- Studio: Sound Recorders (Kansas City, Kansas); Paramount Recording Studios (Hollywood, California)
- Genre: Pop rock; gospel
- Length: 40:31
- Label: Sparrow
- Producer: Bob Cotton; Phil Keaggy

Phil Keaggy chronology
Ph'lip Side (1980)	Town to Town (1981)	Play thru Me (1982)

Professional ratings
Review scores
Source	Rating
AllMusic	4/5 stars

Town to Town is an album by guitarist Phil Keaggy, released in 1981, on Sparrow Records.

== Track listing ==
All songs written by Phil Keaggy, unless otherwise noted.

Side one

1. "Wished You Were There" – 3:04
2. "Full Circle" – 4:23
3. "Life Love and You" – 4:29
4. "Town to Town" – 6:49

Side two

1. "What a Wonder You Are" – 4:03
2. "In Between" – 3:04
3. "Our Lives" – 5:28
4. "Rise up O Men of God" (music: Keaggy; words: traditional/Keaggy) – 4:13
5. "Let Everything Else Go" – 4:53

Note: On the CD release of this (three LPs on two CDs), the tracks from side one are in reverse order.

== Personnel ==
- Phil Keaggy – vocals, guitars, bass (3, 6)
- Tom Keene – Fender Rhodes (4), acoustic piano (5, 6), synthesizers (6, 9)
- Richard Souther – synthesizers (4, 7, 8)
- Dan Murdoch – Rhodes electric piano (9)
- Curt Bartlett – additional guitars (6, 9)
- Leon Gaer – bass (1, 2, 5), electric bass (4, 7), 6-string bass (4, 7)
- Lee Jones – fretless bass (9)
- Dean Hagen – drums (1, 2, 4, 5, 7)
- Jim DeLong – drums (6, 8, 9), percussion (8)
- Alex Acuña – percussion (2–6)
- Bruce Hibbard – backing vocals (2, 8)
- Michele Pillar – backing vocals (2), vocals (5)
- Bernadette Keaggy – vocals (7)
- Peter York – backing vocals (8)

== Production ==
- Phil Keaggy – producer, arrangements
- Bob Cotton – producer, engineer
- John Pooley – second engineer
- Denny Siegrist – second engineer
- Stan Evenson – art direction, design
- B. Charlyne Hinesley – cover coordinator
- Alan Dolgins – photography
- Barbara Adams – logo design
- Ron Brant – logo design

== Production notes ==
- Produced by Bob Cotton and Phil Keaggy
- Arranged by Phil Keaggy
- Engineered by Bob Cotton
- Recorded at Sound Recorders, Kansas City, Kansas; Paramount Recording Studios, Hollywood, California
