= Mike Mead =

American drummer

Mike Mead is an American drummer, working from the mid-1980s to the mid 2000s with artists in the Christian rock and Contemporary Christian music (CCM) genres.

Mead's first credit is on Rick Cua's 1985 CCM album You're My Road. In addition to his ongoing work with Cua, Mead worked steadily with Phil Keaggy on his late 1980s and early 1990s albums Sunday's Child (1988), Find Me in These Fields (1990) and Crimson and Blue (1993); Steve Taylor on I Predict 1990 (1987) and Squint (1993); as well as with Randy Stonehill, and Dave Perkins. Mead is also a member of Chagall Guevara on MCA records in the early 1990s, along with Taylor, Perkins, Lynn Nichols, and bassist Wade Jaynes. Other notable recordings were with White Heart, Whitecross and Kenny Marks. In addition to studio work, Mead also toured the US and Europe with Chagall, White Heart and Marks.

Mead was also a member of the Compassion International All-Star band with Keaggy, Cua, Stonehill, Margaret Becker and others.

Mead retired from the music industry and settled, with his wife, in Nashville, Tennessee.

In 2022, Chagall Guevera released their second album, Halcyon Days, a combination of songs originally recorded in the 1990s and a handful of new songs, bringing Mead out of retirement, at least for a while. The band reunited to play a live show on July 2, 2022, at Nashville's iconic Ryman Auditorium.
