= Phil Madeira =

American singer-songwriter (born 1952)

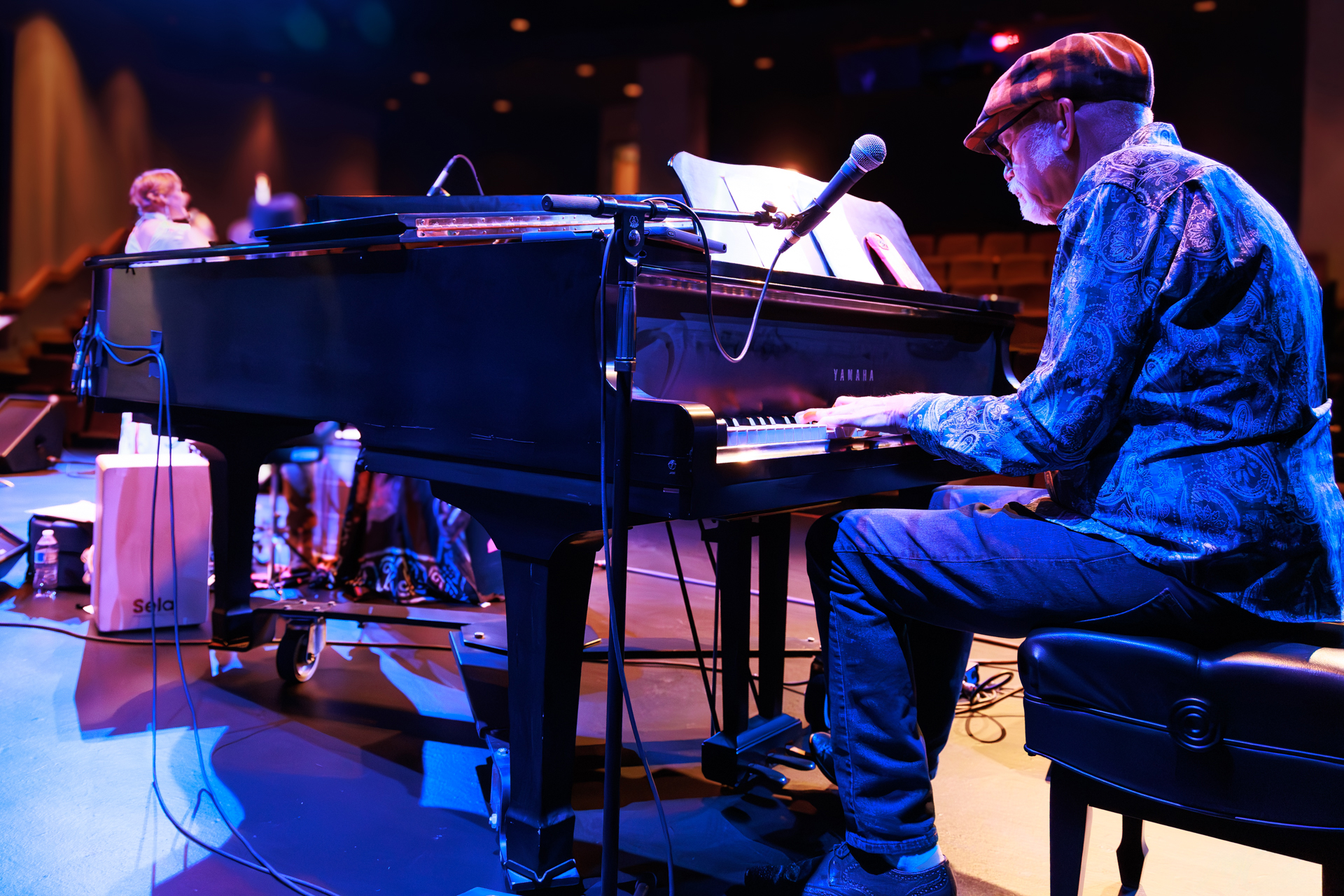
- Madeira in concert, 2025

Background information
- Born: Philip Kamm Madeira; April 29, 1952 (age 74)
- Website: philmadeira.net

Philip Kamm Madeira (born April 29, 1952) is an American songwriter, producer, musician, and singer. He was raised in Barrington, Rhode Island, and graduated from Taylor University in 1975. He lives in Nashville, Tennessee.

His songs have been recorded by The Civil Wars, Buddy Miller, Alison Krauss, Toby Keith, Ricky Skaggs, Bruce Hornsby, Keb' Mo', Garth Brooks, The Nitty Gritty Dirt Band, Cindy Morgan, Shawn Mullins, The North Mississippi Allstars. His co-writing partners include: Will Kimbrough, Matraca Berg, Chuck Cannon, Cindy Morgan, Wayne Kirkpatrick, Gordon Kennedy, Keb' Mo', and Emmylou Harris.

== Achievements and awards ==
Madeira recorded three solo albums. He received the Nashville Music Award (Nammy) for Best Keyboardist in 2000.

In 1986, he received a Humanitarian Award from ASCAP for his effort in raising consciousness and money for the Ethiopian hunger crisis.

In 2009, he received the Dove Award for "Recorded Country Song of the Year" from the Gospel Music Association, for his song "I Wish", co-written with Cindy Morgan.

== Life and career ==
From 1976 to 1978, Madeira was a member of the Phil Keaggy Band, with Lynn Nichols, Terry Andersen and Dan Cunningham. The Ithaca, New York-based band released one album together, entitled Emerging. The band broke up in 1978 and Madeira relocated to Nashville in 1983 where he worked as a sideman and a songwriter, making solo records independently.

In 2008, Madeira joined Emmylou Harris's band "The Red Dirt Boys".

In 2012, Madeira provided the musical backdrop for Merrill Farnsworth's theatrical piece "Jezebel's Got The Blues... and Other Works of Imagination". Madeira produced a collection of Americana musicians covering Paul McCartney songs on "Let Us In: Americana", a benefit for The Women and Cancer Fund. In the same year, Madeira completed production on "Mercyland: Hymns For The Rest Of Us" which features Emmylou Harris, The Civil Wars, Mat Kearney, Dan Tyminski, Cindy Morgan, John Scofield, the Carolina Chocolate Drops, Buddy Miller, and Shawn Mullins, North Mississippi Allstars, Amy Stroup, and Phil Madeira.

In 2013, Madeira released "PM", his first solo album in 15 years. Madeira released his first book, God on the Rocks: Distilling Religion, Savoring Faith in June 2013, published by Jericho Books. Later in 2013, Madeira and occasional production partner Lynn Nichols produced the major-label debut of Pawnshop Kings, a brother duo from Southern California. Madeira appeared with Neil Young, Sheryl Crow, Leon Russell, and Jack White on CMT's Willie Nelson's 80th Birthday Party, hosted by CMT network.

The year 2014 marked the release of Humming People's "City of Lost Men", produced in Norway by Madeira, leading to a long-standing relationship with the band. Madeira's song "From This Valley" (co-written and recorded by The Civil Wars) won the Grammy for Best Country Performance by a Duo in 2014.

Madeira commenced work on a follow-up to his "Mercyland" project in the summer of 2014. "Mercyland: Hymns For The Rest Of Us, Vol II" was released on Mercyland Records in 2016. And in 2015, Madeira finished two solo projects, "Motorcycle" and "Soul Of A Man".

Madeira produced Treasure of the Broken Land: The Songs of Mark Heard featuring Red Dirt Boys, Rodney Crowell, Buddy Miller, The North Mississippi Allstars, Amy Speace, Willie Sugarcapps, and others. It was released in 2017.

In 2016, Madeira wrote the liner notes for John Scofield's Grammy winning "Country For Old Men". In 2017, Madeira produced several records for indie artists including Sammy Horner and The Sweet Sorrows, and The Mosleys. Madeira and the other members of The Red Dirt Boys joined Emmylou Harris again for a tour with John Mellencamp.

In April 2018, Madeira release the album "Providence" featuring Madeira on piano and vocals, Chris Donohue on upright bass, and Bryan Owings on drums. Recorded at Nashville's Sound Emporium, the jazz/blues/Americana outing included guest guitarists Will Kimbrough, James Hollihan, and John Scofield.

In 2019, Phil Madeira released the Open Heart album, along with a single "Remember Me". The single received critical acclaim from Rolling Stone who called the piece a poignant yet optimistic New Orleans jazz-inspired tribute to Madeira's late partner.

Madeira appeared as a member of The Ascendants on their 2023 Kickstarter album along with Jimmy Abegg, Steve Hindalong, Matt Slocum and Ben Pearson.

== Personal life ==
Madeira is the uncle of singer-songwriter, Lana Del Rey.

== Discography ==
=== Solo albums ===
- 1985: Citizen of Heaven (Refuge)
- 1995: Off Kilter (self-released, UK and Europe only) critically acclaimed for its dark, moody vibe, Madeira played all instruments except drums (Charlie Morgan) on this recording of songs devoted to matters of the heart.
- 1999: Various Artists - When Worlds Collide: A Tribute to Daniel Amos
- 1999: Three Horseshoes featuring appearances by Phil Keaggy, Antoine Silverman, Derri Daugherty, Steve Hindalong, Terry Scott Taylor, John Hartley (of The Woodthieves), Tammy Rogers (of Dead Reckoning), Buddy Miller, Al Perkins (Flying Burrito Brothers, etc.), Gordon Kennedy, Wayne Kirkpatrick, Tommy Sims (Bruce Springsteen), as well as Madeira's band.
- Coming from Somewhere Else, with Gordon Kennedy, Wayne Kirkpatrick and Billy Sprague
- 2012: Various Artists - Mercyland: Hymns For The Rest Of Us, 2012, (Mercyland)
- 2013: P.M. (Mercyland Records)
- 2015: Various Artists: Mercyland: Hymns For The Rest Of Us Volume II (Mercyland)
- 2015: Motorcycle (Mercyland)
- 2016: Original Sinner (Mercyland)
- 2018: Providence (Mercyland)
- 2019: Crickets (Mercyland)
- 2019: Open Heart (Mercyland)

=== With the Phil Keaggy Band ===
- 1977: Emerging (NewSong)

=== As guest artist ===
- 1983: Mark Heard - Eye of the Storm (Home Sweet Home / Myrrh)
- 1987: Kenny Marks - Make It Right (Dayspring)
- 1991: Ashley Cleveland - Big Town (Atlantic)
- 1993: Billy Sprague - The Wind & The Wave (Benson)
- 1994: Amy Grant - House of Love (A&M)
- 1994: Charlie Peacock - Everything That's On My Mind (Sparrow)
- 1994: Newsong - People Get Ready (Benson)
- 1997: The Waiting - The Waiting (Sparrow)
- 1997: Vanessa Williams - Next (Mercury)
- 1998: The Waiting - Blue Belly Sky (Sparrow)
- 1999: Buddy Miller - Cruel Moon (HighTone)
- 1999: Julie Miller - Broken Things (HighTone)
- 1999: Owsley - Owsley (Giant)
- 1999: Sixpence None the Richer - Sixpence None the Richer (Squint)
- 2000: Dakota Suite - Morning Lake Forever (Houston Party)
- 2000: Tommy Sims- Peace And Love (Universal Motown)
- 2001: Buddy Miller and Julie Miller – Buddy & Julie Miller (HighTone)
- 2002: Buddy Miller - Midnight And Lonesome (HighTone)
- 2002: Randy Stonehill - Edge Of The World (Fair Oaks)
- 2003: Lost Dogs - Nazarene Crying Towel (BEC Recordings)
- 2004: Buddy Miller - Universal United House of Prayer (New West)
- 2006: Tim Finn - Imaginary Kingdom (EMI)
- 2007: Little Big Town - A Place to Land (Equity Music Group)
- 2008: Emmylou Harris - All I Intended to Be (Nonesuch)
- 2013: Hammock - Oblivion Hymns (Hammock Music)
- 2015: The Waterboys - Modern Blues (Harlequin and Clown)

=== As song contributor ===
- 2001: Various Artists - Beat (Silent Planet) - track 13, "The Better Part"
- 2001: Various Artists - Beat (Silent Planet) - track 20, "Change of Heart (live)"
- 2002: Various Artists - Making God Smile: An Artists' Tribute to the Songs of Beach Boy Brian Wilson (Silent Planet) - track 13, "Heroes and Villains"

=== As composer ===
- 1988: Margaret Becker - The Reckoning (Sparrow) - track 2, "You Can't Take It With You"
- 1998: Stonehill - Thirst (Brentwood) - track 3, "Sleeping" (co-written with Randy Stonehill)
- 1992: Michele Wagner - Safe Place (Benson Records) - track 6, "Face To Face" (co-written with Michele Wagner)
- 1999: Alison Krauss - Forget About It (Rounder) - track 4, "Maybe" (co-written with Gordon Kennedy)
- 1994: Phil Keaggy - Blue (Word / Epic) - track 4, "All There Is To Know" (co-written with Phil Keaggy); track 7, "Everywhere I Look"
- 2002: Alison Krauss and Union Station - Live (Rounder) - track 2-5, "Maybe" (co-written with Gordon Kennedy)
- 2005: Geoff Moore - Every Single One: Part 2 (Overflow) - track 9, "The Everlasting" (co-written with Geoff Moore)
- 2012: Matraca Berg - Love's Truck Stop (Proper) - track 10, "Waiting On A Slow Train" (co-written with Matraca Berg)
- 2013: The Civil Wars - The Civil Wars (Sensibility / Columbia) - track 7, "From This Valley" (co-written with John Paul White and Joy Williams)
