= Phil Keaggy =

American acoustic and electric guitarist and vocalist (born 1951)

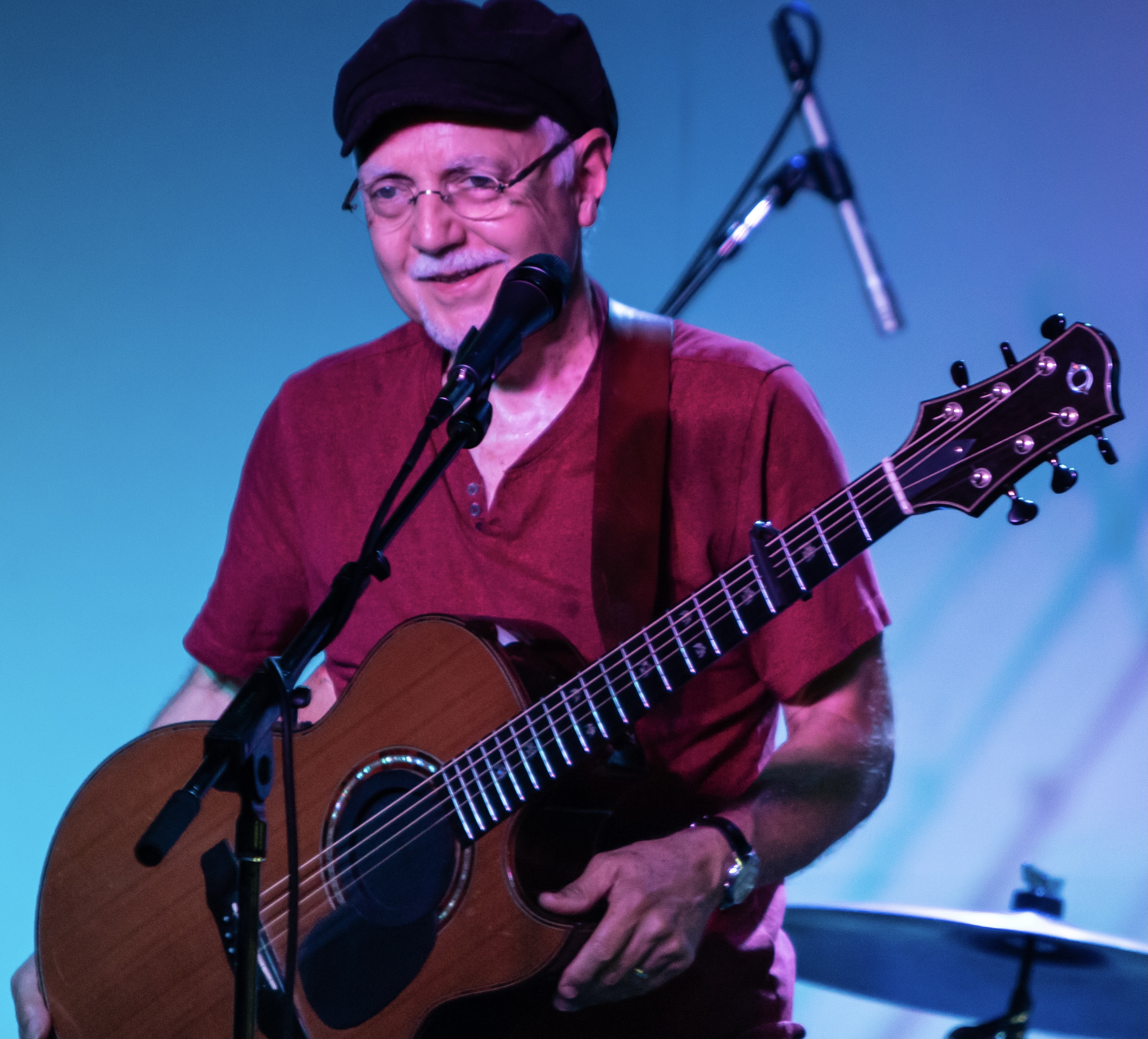
- Keaggy performing in 2019

Background information
- Born: Philip Tyler Keaggy; March 23, 1951 (age 75); Youngstown, Ohio, U.S.
- Genres: Contemporary Christian; Jesus music; Christian rock; Rock; folk rock; jazz rock
- Instruments: Guitar; vocals
- Years active: 1966–present
- Website: philkeaggy.com

Philip Tyler Keaggy (born March 23, 1951) is an American acoustic and electric guitarist and vocalist who has released more than 55 albums and contributed to many more recordings in both the contemporary Christian music and mainstream markets. He is a seven-time recipient of the GMA Dove Award for Instrumental Album of the Year, and he was twice nominated for a Grammy Award for Best Rock Gospel Album. He has frequently been listed as one of the world's top-two "finger-style" and "finger-picking" guitarists by Guitar Player Magazine readers' polls, and due to his complex and virtuosic playing, he has been called one of the greatest guitarists in history.

== Biography ==
=== Early life ===
Keaggy was raised Catholic in a small farmhouse in Hubbard, Ohio, with nine brothers and sisters. He is missing half of the middle finger on his right hand due to an accident at age four involving a water pump. Keaggy reflects on the incident:

We lived on a farm in Hubbard, Ohio which had a big water pump, and I was climbing up on it. As I was kneeling on top of the platform, it broke and the faucets came crashing down on my finger and cut it off. I can remember it very vividly—as if it happened yesterday, and I can see my dad running down the hill, rescuing me, and taking me to the hospital. I can recall having a white cast and bandage; it was gigantic! They tried to sew it on, but it didn't take, so I grew up with nine fingers. As a young kid, I was embarrassed about it a lot, especially when I was beginning to get into guitar.

Initially, it was not the guitar that attracted Keaggy to playing music. "I asked my dad for a set of drums for my tenth birthday but he came home with a Sears Silvertone guitar."

=== 1960s ===
Keaggy was a member of a mid-1960s garage rock band called the Squires; one of their songs ("Batmobile"), which he co-wrote, appears on the compilation album Highs in the Mid-Sixties, Volume 9. In 1966 he joined Volume IV, which in 1967 became New Hudson Exit. The band appeared frequently in Youngstown clubs and also released a Keaggy composition, "Come With Me", as a single on the Date label. At one point, New Hudson Exit had considered Joe Walsh as its lead guitarist. Walsh later established himself as the guitarist for The James Gang before embarking on a solo career and work with the Eagles.

In 1968, Keaggy and longtime friend drummer John Sferra, along with bassist Steve Markulin, formed the band Glass Harp. The band gigged in and around the Youngstown, Ohio area and found work at school dances and clubs. The incarnation of the band recorded several demos, and released the single "Where Did My World Come From?" on the United Audio label in 1969.

Markulin left the group to join his cousin Joe in another successful Youngstown band, The Human Beinz. Keaggy and Sferra then recruited bass player Daniel Pecchio. Pecchio, formerly of the band The Poppy, was also a flute player, a talent which later was showcased on several Glass Harp's songs. After recording a new set of demos and signing with new management, the band set out to polish their live act and shop for a recording deal.

A major turning point for the trio was their winning of an Ohio area's "Battle of the Bands", One of the event's judges happened to be an associate of producer Lewis Merenstein, whom he alerted to the threesome. Merenstein was persuaded to fly down from New York to listen to the band in concert. Upon hearing Glass Harp perform, Merenstein's enthusiastic report resulted in Decca Records signing Glass Harp to a multi-record deal.

=== 1970s ===
Reflecting on 1970, Keaggy recalls:

...the 18th year of my life was very dark; I was into drugs by now....back in '69 I was experimenting with LSD. I had done some trips and it was terrible, I thought it might enhance my creative ability in music, but it didn't. I once heard a tape of me playing when I was high and it was awful. I sang weird and I played badly. I thought I was doing such a great job, but it was a deception. People I was supposedly very close to, who were close to me, were turning on me. It seemed really strange...I was experiencing such fear...it was just...terrible...During these days I would take naps in the afternoon because I'd be so tired playing at night, staying up till 4 in the morning, getting up early and napping again in the afternoon. I'd wake up having nightmares...I had "Peace" written on my wall and I went around giving the peace sign, but I didn't experience peace in my life. I didn't know what peace really meant; it was just a cliché.

On Valentine's Day in 1970, Keaggy's mother was seriously injured in an auto accident. After her death a week later and inspired by his sister, Keaggy became a born-again Christian.

In September of the same year, Glass Harp was in New York's Greenwich Village recording its first album Glass Harp at Jimi Hendrix's Electric Lady Studios with Lewis Merenstein as producer. At the time of the recording, Keaggy and Sferra were nineteen years old. All three members of Glass Harp wrote the band's songs. Keaggy sang the majority of the songs; Pecchio and Sferra also sang lead on several numbers. One song of Keaggy's in particular, "Can You See Me", reflected his newfound Christian faith, with its reference to Jesus' death. Keaggy recalls, "It was recorded in New York City in about a week. Even though I had bronchitis and had to sing one verse at a time, it worked out... I was even able to get in a witness for the Lord Jesus in "Can You See Me" and "Look in the Sky".

As a Decca Records artist, the band began to open for bands including The Kinks, Iron Butterfly, Yes, Traffic, Grand Funk Railroad and Chicago. Contrary to the tight production and song-oriented nature of Glass Harp's studio albums, their live performances demonstrated the band's ability to stretch out and expand the boundaries of their compositions. As a result, they are one of the pioneers of what would later be known as the jam rock genre, with songs many times reaching over 30 minutes in length with extended solo passages and group improvisation.

In 1971, Glass Harp released a follow-up album, Synergy. Again, Keaggy's Christian faith surfaced in some of the lyrics. He notes, "That album was a real experience because I was able to sing 'The Answer', a song I wrote right after my conversion to Christ... with...producers and an engineer that didn't care about Jesus, I was surprised that out of 15 songs, one of the ten that got on the album was 'The Answer'. I praise Jesus for that work, because it's just a simple song of testimony."

The next year the band released its third album: It Makes Me Glad, which included a version of the old spiritual "Do Lord". "We all worked the best that we could. The group knew that it would be our last album together because I had given notice that I was going to leave... on August 8, I did. It was a really heavy thing for everybody."

After recording three albums with Glass Harp, Keaggy left the band in 1972. He said, "We enjoyed playing together and we really got tight musically. But spiritually we were going different directions." In 1973 he released What a Day, his first solo album. The songs were written while Keaggy was still with Glass Harp. He performed all the instruments on the album. The title track is a staple of Keaggy's concerts up to the present day.

Keaggy married his wife Bernadette in the summer of 1973. He took a brief hiatus from recording on his own and only toured in support of other artists like Love Song, 2nd Chapter of Acts, Paul Clark, and Nancy Honeytree. Years later, Amboy Dukes guitarist Ted Nugent was quoted as saying "I don't know what happened to that Phil Keaggy. He could have saved the world with his guitar."

Keaggy and his wife moved to rural Freeville, New York, to participate in and become immersed in the discipleship program of Love Inn Community led by Scottish-American disc-jockey Scott Ross. Ross affiliated himself and Love Inn Community with the Shepherding Movement, which progressively took on many characteristics of an authoritarian cult. Not until Keaggy extracted himself from the group and the menial labor to which they had largely confined him did he once again begin to record significant music.

In late 1974, Keaggy played guitar on Joe Vitale's debut solo album Roller Coaster Weekend produced by The Albert Brothers. The album featured guitarists Joe Walsh and Rick Derringer. Keaggy returned to the studio in 1976 with Love Broke Thru, an album which included his version of a song which has become a classic in Christian music: "Your Love Broke Through". It was written by Keith Green, Todd Fishkind, and Randy Stonehill; the song later became closely identified with Green, yet it was at Green's insistence that Keaggy's rendition be the first released recording.

A longtime fan of C. S. Lewis, Keaggy also included an arranged version of the author's poem "As the Ruin Falls". The seven-minute "Time" is considered by some fans to be the first album-oriented rock extended-length "Free Bird" of contemporary Christian music. "Time" featured Keaggy's innovative guitar technique of violin-like swelling, found approximately 3:54 and 5:17 in the song. The effect requires picking the string, then raising and lowering the guitar volume knob for each note in a melody. His album was listed as No. 64 in the 2001 book, CCM Presents: The 100 Greatest Albums in Christian Music.

During the summer of 1977 Keaggy went on an eighteen-city tour of the western United States with 2nd Chapter of Acts and "A Band called David". The tour was filmed for the live triple-album How the West Was One, a collection which featured concert renditions of "What a Day" and "Your Love Broke Through". In the same year the Phil Keaggy Band was formed. Composed of Keaggy, guitarist Lynn Nichols, keyboardist Phil Madeira, bassist Dan Cunningham, and drummer Terry Andersen, the Phil Keaggy Band released their only album in 1977, Emerging. The band was featured as Love Inn Company on an album of songs by Ted Sandquist titled Courts of the King, and as the backing band for Nedra Ross on her Full Circle album. The title track was re-recorded by Keaggy in 1981. Song in the Air., a Glass Harp compilation album was released in 1977.

In 1978, Keaggy released his first critically acclaimed instrumental album entitled The Master and the Musician. It is the best-selling album of his career. A 1989 reissue of the album included a new track, "Epilogue: Amazing Grace".

=== 1980s ===
The Keaggy family moved to Leawood, Kansas in August 1979; their first daughter, Alicia, was born there in March 1980. They left Leawood in 1983 and lived in Costa Mesa, California. Their second daughter, Olivia, was born on February 14, 1984, and their son Ian was born on June 16, 1987.

Keaggy's record label during the early part of the decade was Sparrow Records. 1980's Ph'lip Side features "Sunday School" and the gentle "Little Ones", an early anthem for the pro-life/anti-abortion movement. Town to Town, was released in 1981; it is noted for what has become a concert staple "Let Everything Else Go". It included his arrangement of "Rise Up O Men of God". A trend was begun in which Keaggy frequently featured a hymn on his albums. In 1982, Keaggy released Play Thru Me, known for its upbeat classic, "Morning Light" as well as the slide-guitar instrumental workout, "Happy".

In 1984, Keaggy and Randy Stonehill co-wrote and sang the duet "Who Will Save the Children?" for Stonehill's album Celebrate This Heartbeat. The duet became a theme song for Compassion International, a Christian child advocacy ministry. The next year Nissi Records released Keaggy's next studio album, Getting Closer. Keaggy would later re-record two of the album's songs: a rearranged version of "I Will Be There" appears on 1993's Crimson and Blue while "Passport" received an update for the 2009 Christian Progressive Rock compilation album CPR 3.

Way Back Home was released in 1986. The album has quieter acoustic numbers including a new rendition of 1981's "Let Everything Else Go" and "Maker of the Universe", a ballad about the incarnation of Christ. The album also emphasized one of the prominent themes in Keaggy's music: family. The next year Phil Keaggy released his second instrumental album, The Wind and the Wheat. The album reflects the "new-age" instrumental sounds of the day. The Wind and the Wheat won the guitarist his first Dove Award, an honor that he received in 1988. Also in 1988, Keaggy and Stonehill would team up with singer Margaret Becker, former Wings drummer Joe English and others as the Compassion All Star Band. The group released a subsequent live album One by One.

In 1988, Keaggy collaborated with Randy Stonehill, vocalist Russ Taff, bassist Rick Cua, Derri Daugherty, Mark Heard, Steve Taylor and other musicians to create Phil Keaggy and Sunday's Child. Lynn Nichols, guitarist for the 1977 Keaggy Band, produced the Sunday's Child project. Referring to the Sunday's Child album cover, Keaggy said,

(The idea) was the producer's. I actually had a different cover in mind...It was...a black and white [photograph] of my daughter Olivia sitting on a guitar case, with this Gretsch anniversary model standing up behind her against this concrete wall, and she's got a little white flower wreath in her hair. She's about four years old, and...I just loved that cover. So when the album came out, I wasn't really knocked out by the Beatles thing, because it didn't look like the Beatles to me! It was my goofy face and then these three guys in the background, one of which was Lynn Nichols, the producer. And I thought, "Oh, I don't care for this." I wanted to have the other cover. I wanted it to say "Phil Keaggy and Sunday's Child," and to me, that was Olivia, being as she's my daughter. So my nephew works in a printing place, and I created this cover that had all the same photos and information inside the CD insert, but I had him make 500 of these new covers, and we took the shrink wrap off...500 CDs, and...inserted these covers that I wanted and took them on the road and sold them, and we mailed them out through the fan club, since we didn't have a website in those days."

About the music on the project, Keaggy says,

I feel the album, as a good collection of songs, is really listenable...I feel that folk who want to listen to an album are more interested in good songs than merely the guitar player. For Sunday's Child, not only did we resort to using vintage guitars and amps, but I resorted back to old ways of playing. The rock leads are shorter and more precise. More to the point, feisty, and a little bit more dangerous. What you get is more incisive work. It's something that fits the song rather than trying to create a song around a riff or guitar figure...What I think comes through this album is that sense of longing, of love, of suffering and in all of this there can be hope. Everyone has to find their way to God and I hope people will see Jesus in my life and this album as a guide along the way."

One track, "I've Just Begun (Again)", was first written when Keaggy was 17 and later updated for the album. In addition to his own music, he recorded two Mark Heard songs for the album: "I Always Do" and "Everything is Alright". The recordings appear again on tribute albums to Heard. One of the tribute albums, Orphans of God, was listed at No. 25 in the book, CCM Presents: The 100 Greatest Albums in Christian Music.

Also in 1989, Keaggy went on the road with Stonehill for a tour by The Keaggy/Stonehill Band, which included Swirling Eddie drummer David Raven and Daniel Amos bassist Tim Chandler.

A few years later, Keaggy performed at former Beatle Paul McCartney's sister-in-law's wedding. Keaggy had met Laura Eastman, sister of Linda McCartney, while the former worked at Christian Broadcasting Network in Virginia Beach, Virginia.

=== 1990s ===
Keaggy followed Sunday's Child in 1990 with an all-out rock album Find Me in These Fields. The project was produced by Lynn Nichols and received a Grammy award nomination. In 1992, Keaggy released what has become a landmark acoustic instrumental album, Beyond Nature. His third instrumental project reflected a Celtic-influence and earned the guitarist his second Dove Award in the "Instrumental Record" category. The album's title, Beyond Nature, was derived from a quote in C. S. Lewis' book Mere Christianity. A long-time fan of Lewis' work, Keaggy also referenced the author in several song titles ("Brother Jack", "Addison's Walk" and "County Down").

In 1993, Keaggy worked with a group of talented musicians on a project. The recording sessions reunited Keaggy with former Glass Harp bandmate John Sferra on drums. Keaggy said, "I started Crimson & Blue with a two-fold purpose: To record something more aggressive and to work with John again. We recorded all the basic tracks together and most of the leads were recorded live. It's just your basic four-piece group." The rest of the group was Phil Madeira, the former keyboardist of the 1977 Phil Keaggy Band; bassist Wade Jaynes, and guitarist Jimmy Abegg. Lynn Nichols produced the sessions.

Other guest musicians included Sam Bush on mandolin, John Mark Painter (of Fleming and John), and Ashley Cleveland on backing vocals. Charlie Peacock and Steve Taylor played a prominent role in the project. The sessions resulted in the release of Crimson and Blue, a bluesy rock album geared to the Christian market which included a cover of Van Morrison's "When Will I Ever Learn to Live in God". "Love Divine", "I Will Be Here", and "Everywhere I Look"; they all received substantial airplay. The album was released simultaneously in the mainstream market as Blue, with a modified track list and some reworked songs. The most significant differences are the inclusion of three different songs (a cover of Badfinger's "Baby Blue"; "All Our Wishes"; and "The Further Adventures of...") and the exclusion of five songs from Crimson and Blue ("Love Divine", "Reunion of Friends", "Stone Eyes", "I Will Be There", and "Nothing But The Blood".) The song "All Our Wishes" is a story about Phil and Bernadette Keaggy losing a baby. The song was written, musically, in 1967 when Keaggy was in ninth grade. The band that toured in support of the album featured Madeira on Hammond B-3 organ, Sferra on drums, and Wade Jaynes (of Chagall Guevara) on bass.

In June 1994, Keaggy released a heavily revised version of his 1986 album Way Back Home. The 1994 edition featured new recordings of ten of the original album's eleven songs, including the moving classics "Maker of the Universe" and "Let Everything Else Go". The updated version also included four brand new tracks: "It Could Have Been Me". "She's a Dancer", "Father Daughter Harmony", and "The 50th". Keeping with the album's family motif, "Father Daughter Harmony" was a moving duet with daughter Alicia while "The 50th" features Keaggy's guitar playing over excerpts from a vinyl record of his grandparents' 50th wedding anniversary in 1948.

In 1995, Time: 1970-1995., a two volume compilation project was released. The anthology has selections from throughout Keaggy's career, including several classic instrumentals. Several unreleased tracks are featured, including a live version of "Do Lord" with Glass Harp, a live version of "Shouts of Joy" from the Crimson and Blue tour, and "We'll Meet Again", a song he wrote and recorded as a teenager. An alternate version of "Time" was also included as was a new solo recording of the Glass Harp song "The Answer". Also in 1995, he was voted by Guitar Player Magazine readers as the No. 2 Best Acoustic Fingerstyle Guitarist.

That same year, Keaggy released what has become one of his best-selling albums, True Believer. The title track was written by producer Alan Shacklock and reached number one on the Christian radio charts. It won Shacklock the EMI Songwriter of the Year award. Shacklock's production work on the album was a departure in style and sound for Keaggy. It proved to be Keaggy's lone work with Shacklock. Years later, in reflecting on the album, Keaggy said that True Believer "is really the most unlike me of any album I've ever done, in my personal opinion. It was more of a manufactured concept: "We're gonna make a pop album for you that's going to launch you into the next ten years". I don't know if it did. It's an unusual album to listen to for me, but there are a couple of good songs on there, though."

The next year Keaggy released another critically acclaimed instrumental album, Acoustic Sketches. Mainly Keaggy originals, the album features a cover of "Swing Low, Sweet Chariot"; he won another Dove Award for the album. A second instrumental album, 220, was released. The album, named for the 220 volt electric standard, featured a diverse mix of musical styles, ranging from blues to Celtic. The album's final track, "Ian's Groove", marks the recording debut of Phil's son on drums. Despite its stellar performances, as a collection of original instrumentals, the album was largely overlooked. Keaggy says, "that was a very cool album that...Christians and Christian bookstores and...the marketplace ...couldn't make the connection, because it's electric guitar music... it kind of fell by the wayside." Also in 1996, his wife Bernadette published A Deeper Shade of Grace, a moving account of the emotional and spiritual struggles she experienced in losing their first five children via early infant death, miscarriage, and stillbirth. Phil wrote the foreword for the book.

In January 1997, the Rock and Roll Hall of Fame in Cleveland, Ohio opened an exhibit, "My Town". Because the exhibit focused on Cleveland's rock and roll history, Glass Harp was invited to perform at the museum. The band is also currently represented in the museum's Ohio Exhibit. On the Fly was also released in 1997, arguably his most ambitious instrumental project to date. Released through Canis Major Records, highlights are Spanish-flavored "Praise Dance", the hypnotic groove "Firewalker", and the six-part epic, "Way of the Pilgrim". Also in 1997, he teamed up with Wes King and Out of the Grey's Scott Dente for the mostly instrumental album Invention. The album would win a Dove Award the following year. Keaggy would then go on to sign with Word Records.

Phil Keaggy, Keaggy's last vocal album of the decade came out in 1998. Lacking the slick production style of the previous vocal album, True Believer, Phil Keaggy was a strong return to form for Keaggy in terms of recapturing his usual organic, live sound. Several songs reflected a Beatles influence, including "Days Like You", his last single to receive considerable airplay as Christian radio seemed to move towards a more youth-oriented format. He also appeared as a guest singer on the Ragamuffins' "All the Way to Kingdom Come", on his friend Rich Mullins's last original work, The Jesus Record (which contained demo tracks recorded by Mullins just before his 1997 death, and renditions of those songs by the Ragamuffins and other artists).

In 1999 there was a flurry of Keaggy instrumental releases. The double album Premium Jams is a stunning collection of previously unreleased electric instrumentals dating back to the recording sessions for Crimson and Blue and 220. Majesty and Wonder, a Christmas album featuring the London Festival Orchestra, includes Keaggy's take on standards such as "Oh Holy Night" as well as a three-part original, "Nativity Suite". Majesty and Wonder garnered him a Dove Award. He later released the four-disc collection Music to Paint By. The project was composed of Still Life, Electric Blue, Splash, and Brushstrokes.

=== 2000s ===
Re-Emerging, Keaggy's first album of the new millennium, came out in April 2000. The disc was a reunion of the Phil Keaggy Band; they updated their classic 1977 album, Emerging. With the exception of "Gentle Eyes", Re-Emerging retained the material from the original album and also introduced four brand new tracks: "My Auburn Lady", "Mighty Lord", "You're My Hero", and "Amelia Earhart's Last Flight".

In September of the same year, Keaggy released the instrumental album Zion. Recorded exclusively on a Zion Radicaster built by master guitarmaker Ken Hoover of Zion guitars, Zion features a mix of new songs such as "Z-Blues" and revamped versions of "Like an Island", "March of the Clouds" and the Glass Harp classic "Whatever Life Demands".

In October 2000, Keaggy, John Sferra and Daniel Pecchio reunited as Glass Harp for a concert in their hometown of Youngstown at a sold out Powers Auditorium. They had performed together occasionally since 1981. Conductor Isaiah Jackson and members of the Youngstown Symphony joined the band. The next year Strings Attached was released, the reunion concert live album. Although the album is largely devoted to the band's previous work, it also includes Glass Harp's version of several songs from Keaggy's solo career including "Tender Love", "Chalice", "From the Beginning", and a solo acoustic version of "The True Believers".

October 2000 was also when Inseparable was released, initially available in both single and double disc format; the single disc version went out of print. The album featured "Chalice", a collaboration with Glass Harp drummer Sferra as well as a cover of Paul McCartney's "Motor of Love". In the same month, Keaggy released Lights of Madrid, an album of Spanish-flavored instrumentals which included a re-recording of "Praise Dance" from 1996's On the Fly. Lights of Madrid contains a PDF with guitar tablature for the album's music. Lights of Madrid won Keaggy a Dove Award for best instrumental album. In November 2000, he released The Uncle Duke project, a collaboration with his uncle Dave "Duke" Keaggy, with Phil Keaggy setting his uncle's eclectic poetry to music.

In 2001, Phil Keaggy released the albums In the Quiet Hours and Cinemascapes. Both have selections from the 1999 four-disc project Music to Paint By. In the Quiet Hours showcased a new composition "As It Is in Heaven"; Cinemascapes includes three previously unreleased songs: "The Road Home", "Lighthouse", and "For the Love". The song "Spring" was previously released on 2000's Uncle Duke as "Interlude". What Matters, a nine-song compilation drawing mostly from the albums Phil Keaggy and Crimson and Blue was also released in 2001. "Tell Me How You Feel" from Sunday's Child is included as well as a new song "What Matters". The album was exclusively produced for and released through the International Bible Society.

In 2002, Hymnsongs was released. Primarily a collection of classic hymns, the album also includes a Keaggy original composition which is centered around the Lord's Prayer. The track, "Our Daily Bread" as well as the entire album, are dedicated to Todd Beamer, a Christian passenger of 9-11's Flight 93 who was a fan of Keaggy's music. Describing the concept of the project, Keaggy says, "I've always loved hymns. They're great melodies that still stand on their own, and are still sung, even after centuries have passed... those melodies are even more appreciated when you know the lyrics. The writers of the hymns were great wordsmiths; they could be so concise and so eloquent in their expression of truth... theirs is music that speaks to every generation". Yet Keaggy's label at the time, Word Records, did not share his vision for the project and asked for it to be an instrumental album. Keaggy said, "It's the oddest thing...to me, hymns should be really sung. I had a conflict with it because, here I am, I can sing, and yet they didn't want me to sing...I offered--I went to management about it and it was pretty much, "No, don't do that. That's not want they want."" Hymnsongs would be Keaggy's last album with Word Records.

In the same year, Phil also participated on Randy Stonehill's Edge of the World album, singing a duet "That's the Way It Goes" as well as appearing on "We Were All So Young" with other veteran musicians such as Larry Norman. Additionally, Bernadette Keaggy published Losing You Too Soon, an updated version of A Deeper Shade of Grace, her 1996 book on losing her first five children through early infant death, miscarriage and stillbirth.

The next year Keaggy released It's Personal, an album in which he set poetry by Keith Moore to music. Keaggy and Moore had previously collaborated on the song "A Little Bit of Light" that appeared on the guitarist's 1998 self-titled album. Also in 2003 Keaggy released Special Occasions, an eclectic collection of music focusing on birthdays, weddings and graduations. The album consisted primarily of Keaggy originals and also featured a re-recording of "Here and Now" from 1986's Way Back Home, as well as covers of the Beatles tune "When I'm 64" and Elton John's "The Greatest Discovery". That same year, Sparrow Records, Phil's former record label (1980–1983, 1994–1997), released a 15-track compilation History Makers. It features standards such as "Let Everything Else Go", "Morning Light", and "The True Believers". 2003 also saw the release of Hourglass, the first album of new material by Glass Harp since 1972. The album included a new recording of a rare Keaggy solo tune, "What Matters", the title track of a compilation album exclusively produced for and released through the International Bible Society in 2001.

Also in 2003, guitarist Muriel Anderson released an album with Keaggy entitled Precious Gems. A collection primarily consisting of instrumental improvisations recorded in 2001 and 2003, the two also perform Keaggy's "Tennessee Morning" from his 1996 album 220. Guitarist Stanley Jordan appears on several songs. Portions of the album's earnings go towards Anderson's Music for Life Alliance fundraiser.

The following year, Glass Harp released Stark Raving Jams, a triple-disc 39-song collection of material spanning from 1970 to 2003. The collection focused primarily on live performances but also includes a few unreleased studio recordings. Like Strings Attached, this Glass Harp album includes live renditions of some Keaggy solo material.

In 2004 Keaggy guest performed with the indie band Dispatch for several songs during The Last Dispatch. Phil also released two live DVDS: Phil Keaggy in Concert: St. Charles IL, and Philly Live!

In 2005, after thirty years of being out of print, Glass Harp's first three studio albums were reissued on CD by Music Mill Entertainment. The albums were digitally remastered and include previously unreleased bonus tracks. In July, Keaggy also released an expanded edition of Uncle Duke. First released in 2000, this new edition was entitled The Uncle Duke Project and included the original album plus a bonus disc of new songs, alternate versions and an interview with Phil and his uncle.

The next year, Keaggy released Freehand, the sequel to Acoustic Sketches. That same year Keaggy and long-time friend Randy Stonehill released Together Live! in both album and DVD format. In addition to including acoustic renditions of Keaggy and Stonehill's solo material, the project includes versions of their previous collaborations such as "Sunday's Child", "Who Will Save the Children?" and "That's the Way It Goes". Keaggy later guest performed on two songs of Rufus Tree's album Dying To Live.

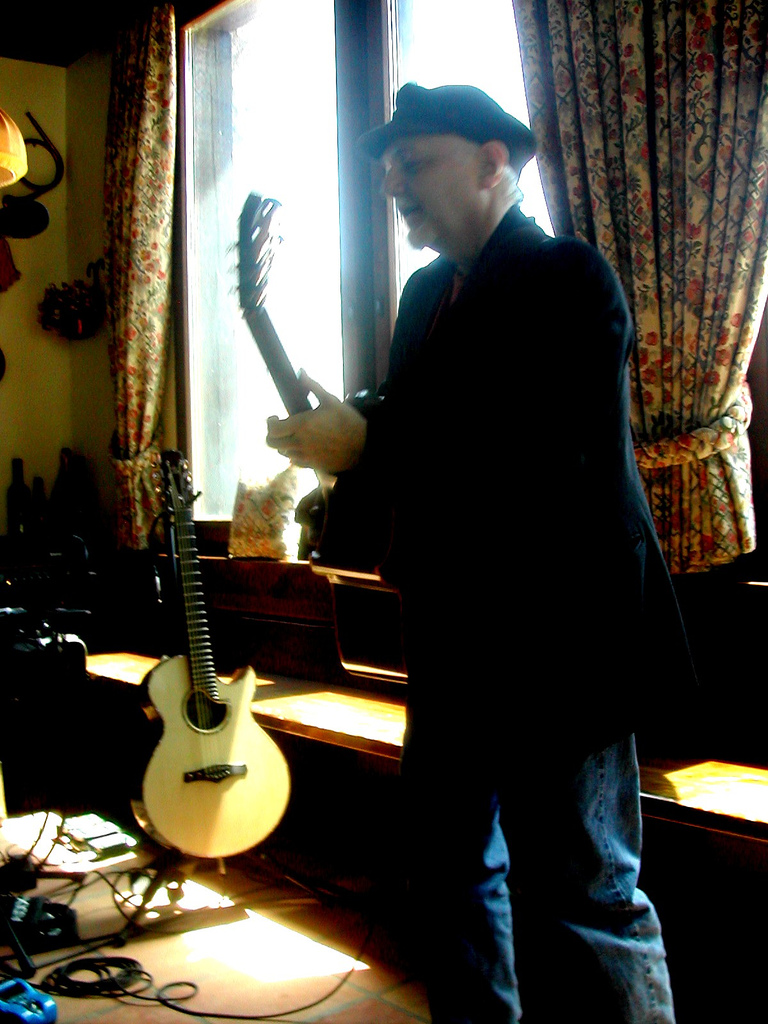
Keaggy in 2006

In 2006, Keaggy release three additional instrumental albums: Jammed! was a one-disc collection of songs featured previously on 1999's double album Premium Jams. The album also included a new rendering of "Ode to Joy" titled "Joyphil" and "Prehistrobie K-18", a previously unreleased song that Phil wrote and recorded as a teenager. The acoustic instrumental album Roundabout, is another instrumental collection. The songs are either improvisation or other riffs played over loops that were recorded as part of the performance. Keaggy explains that the songs "began with me messing around at my soundchecks before the audience came in. I'd typically just come from taking a nap at a hotel, so my mind would be fresh, and I'd improvise loops that would be recorded by my soundman, Brian Persall. The loops have rhythm, lead, bass, and even percussion parts along with textures created using an EBow and placing plastic between the strings, which creates koto, banjo, and steel drum-type sounds. After I returned home, I imported all of the loops into Pro Tools and edited some sections, but no overdubs were added either after the initial recording or while in the studio. If a song was too long, I might edit some measures or repeated sections to make it a little less repetitious, or maybe move some bits around."

Phil Keaggy and guitarist Mike Pachelli released an acoustic instrumental project titled Two of Us. Also in 2006 Phil released a vocal album, Dream Again. It includes his son Ian, who co-wrote, sings and plays guitar on "Why" while his daughter Alicia sings a duet with her father on "Micah 6:8". In 2006, Glass Harp reunited for a concert to celebrate the release of their first DVD, Circa 72. The DVD is the first official release of their 1972 PBS concert, and includes rare outtakes, home movie footage, and a commentary by the band. The year also saw the release of Happy Valentine's Day, a limited edition compilation of various love songs that Phil had recorded over the years as well as four new tracks.

In April 2006 Keaggy launched a free podcast that is available through his website and iTunes. His last edition to date is from September 2008. The Podcasts feature music and commentary from Phil as well as music from some of his favorite artists.

On October 29, 2007, Keaggy was inducted into the Gospel Music Hall of Fame by P.O.D. guitarist Jason Truby. He also released Acoustic Cafe, an album, that with the exception of "You Have My Heart", is a collection of covers ranging from Bob Dylan ("If Not For You", "Make You Feel My Love") to Cyndi Lauper ("Time After Time"). Many of the songs are duets, such as the Beatles' "In My Life" with Randy Stonehill and the Everly Brothers "All I Have to Do is Dream" with Jeremy Casella. Later that year Keaggy released another acoustic instrumental album: The Song Within. Recorded using a McPherson acoustic guitar, the album revamped two Keaggy classics, with "What a Day" being transformed as "Water Day" and "Noah's Song" undergoing significant revision as "Noah's Shuffle".

2007 also marked the 30th anniversary of the landmark instrumental album, 1978's The Master and the Musician. The album was re-released with a bonus disc of outtakes, alternate versions and a recent interview. Keaggy also toured in support of the album's anniversary with a band that featured Glass Harp drummer John Sferra. The tour was chronicled on the subsequent live DVD: The Master & the Musician: 30 Years Later Tour. The next year Keaggy released the album Phantasmagorical: Master and Musician 2, the sequel to his 1978 masterpiece.

In 2008, Keaggy received the Gold Level Award as the "Best Spiritual / Worship Guitarist", as voted by readers of Acoustic Guitar Magazine, as well as appearing in the form of vocals and lead guitar on the Richard Cummins CD, Moments, which was nominated for "Best Pop/Contemporary Album of the Year" by the Canadian GMA's, Covenant award.

In June 2009, Keaggy and Randy Stonehill released a new studio album titled Mystery Highway. In support of the album, the two musicians, along with guitarist Mike Pachelli and Glass Harp's Daniel Pecchio and John Sferra, played several concerts as "The Keaggy-Stonehill Band". The year also saw Keaggy contribute a soaring re-recorded version of "Passport" on the album CPR 3; a compilation of musicians from the Christian Progressive Rock (CPR) scene. The original version of "Passport" appeared on Keaggy's 1985 album Getting Closer. In October, Keaggy released an instrumental album with pianist Jeff Johnson titled Frio Suite. After meeting each other for the first time at the beginning of the year, the two musicians stayed in touch and created the album via email, with Johnson recording in Seattle while Keaggy recorded in Nashville. December saw the release of the guitarist's third Christmas album, Welcome Inn. Featuring mostly original compositions such as the title track, Welcome Inn also includes the classic "God Rest Ye Merry Gentlemen" and an acoustic instrumental version of "In the Bleak Midwinter". The project also includes a new recording of "On that Day", a song co-written with Glass Harp drummer John Sferra for Keaggy's True Believer album in 1995.

On March 27, 2010, Glass Harp released their fourth live album: Glass Harp Live at the Beachland Ballroom 11.01.08. The ten-song project included material from Phil's solo career: "Sign Came through a Window" and "John the Revelator". The album is a recording of a benefit concert that Glass Harp headlined for Roots of American Music (www.rootsofamericanmusic.org), "an organization dedicated to the preservation, performance and education about traditional American music in our schools."

Also in late 2010, Keaggy did some session work with former Monkees member Micky Dolenz for Dolenz's solo album King for a Day. and he played guitar on the song "Rushing Wind" on Steve Clark's album Save The Day.

In the fall of 2010, The Phil Keaggy Trio released their first album, Inter-Dimensional Traveler. The project is a collaboration with keyboardist Jack Giering and Glass Harp drummer John Sferra. and is described as "being a wonderful blend of ambient jazz and funk", as well as "being accredited with creating some of the tastiest jazz-funk licks to come out of Music City in a long, long time."

In addition to recording and touring regularly, Keaggy is currently working on a record with former Living Sacrifice and P.O.D. guitarist Jason Truby.

In 2024 Keaggy collaborated with fellow Christian musicians Neal Morse, Byron House and Chester Thompson to form the band Cosmic Cathedral. Their debut album, Deep Water, was released on April 25, 2025.

== Rumored comments by Jimi Hendrix and others ==
For decades, rumors have circulated which say that many guitar icons have made comments regarding Phil Keaggy. The most common rumored statements are attributed to Jimi Hendrix.

In a February 5, 1971, feature on Glass Harp in Cleveland's The Plain Dealer, the paper's rock music critic Jane Scott cited unnamed "record people" who recounted a story of Hendrix saying (in 1970) "That guy (Phil Keaggy) is the upcoming guitar player in the Midwest".

In later years, rumors became stories of Hendrix appearing on various television programs where he mentioned Phil Keaggy. A common variation says that during an episode of The Tonight Show, Johnny Carson asked Hendrix, "Who is the best guitarist in the world?" Hendrix is said to have answered, "Phil Keaggy." Since then it has been proven to be untrue, as evidenced by the available audio from Hendrix's (only) appearance on The Tonight Show on July 10, 1969, with guest host Flip Wilson. No mention of Keaggy or Glass Harp is made.

Another version has Hendrix being asked, "Jimi, how does it feel to be the world's greatest guitar player?" Hendrix supposedly replied, "I don't know, you'll have to ask Phil Keaggy!" The account is sometimes attributed to a magazine interview in either Rolling Stone or Guitar Player. Occasionally the story has the setting for the question being a Hendrix appearance on The Dick Cavett Show, which is also untrue, as the clip from the show (in 1969) contains no mention of any other guitar players.

Other variants of the urban legend exist with Hendrix answering the question with Rory Gallagher, Terry Kath, Billy Gibbons, or John McLaughlin in place of Keaggy. Other variants have the question being answered by Eric Clapton. A more recent variant has Eddie Van Halen being asked the same question by David Letterman or Barbara Walters, usually answering "I don't know, you'll have to ask Randy Rhodes."

Keaggy has continually insisted that such stories are completely unfounded, noting that "it was impossible that Jimi Hendrix could ever have heard me ... We ... recorded our first album at Electric Lady Studios two weeks after his unfortunate death, so I just can't imagine how he could've heard me. I think it's just a rumor that someone's kept alive, and it must be titillating enough to keep an interest there ... I don't think it was said." Keaggy's recollection of the time frame during which Glass Harp's first album was recorded differs slightly from Glass Harp's officially-published history (which have the recording sessions ending on September 17, 1970, just hours before Hendrix's early-morning death in London, and not two weeks after).

In a July 2010 interview, Glass Harp bassist Daniel Pecchio commented on the ongoing Hendrix rumors saying, "It's a true urban legend. I still have people coming up to me claiming to have a Dick Cavett Show tape where Hendrix says that. We never pushed that rumor, you know, but it didn't hurt us."

== Personal life ==
Phil Keaggy's son Ian was the bass player for the band Hot Chelle Rae, which had a Top 10 hit on the Billboard Hot 100 in 2011. Ian left the band in 2013 to pursue a solo career.

Phil Keaggy's nephew was married to contemporary Christian singer songwriter Cheri Keaggy.

Phil Keaggy's sister is former American television and film actress Mary Ellen Kay, who died in 2017. Keaggy credits her for introducing him to the Christian faith, although he was raised Catholic.
