= Rick Cua =

Musical artist (born 1948)

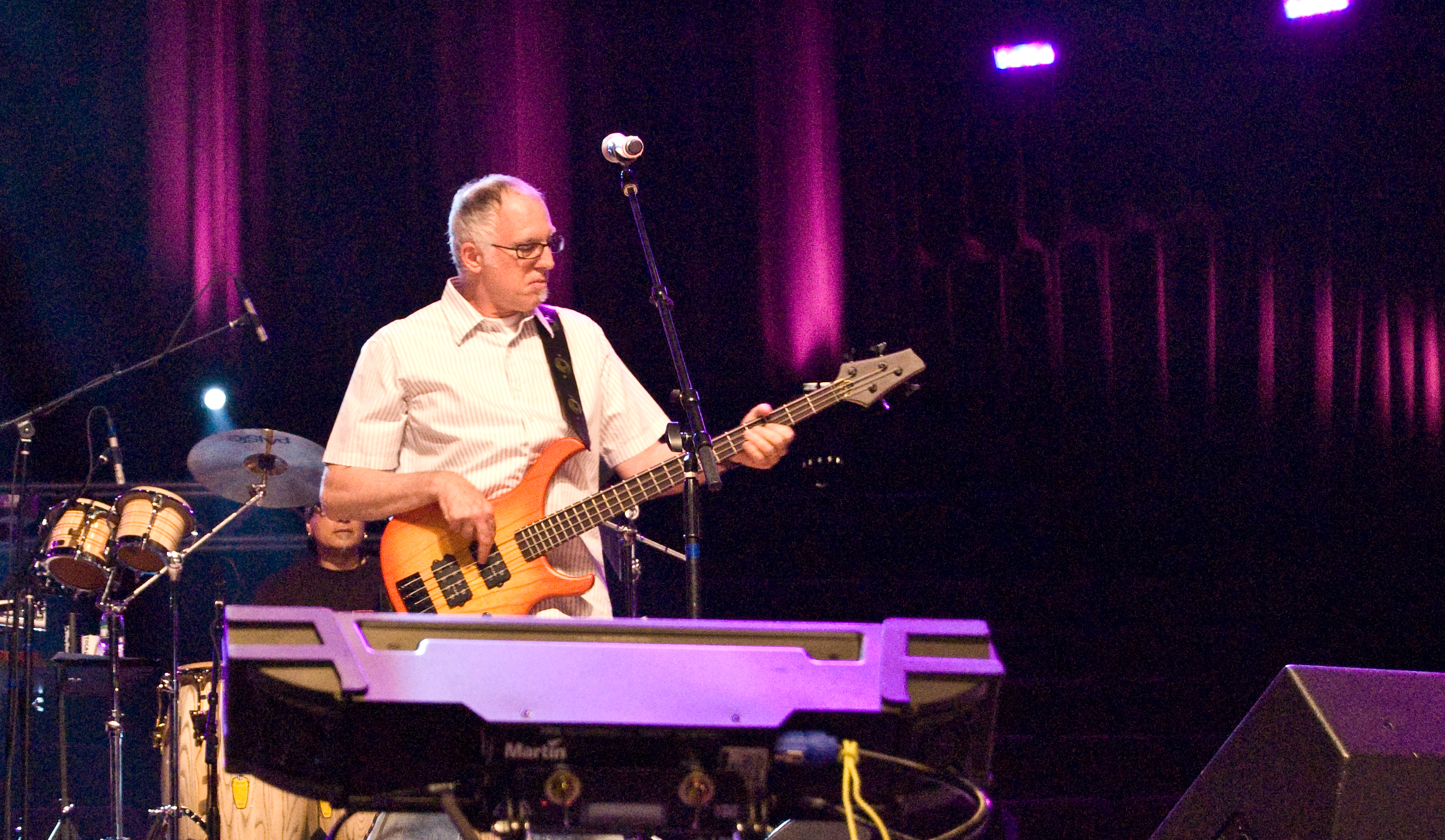
- Rick Cua in 2008

Background information
- Born: December 3, 1948 (age 77); Syracuse, New York, US
- Genres: Christian rock, Southern rock
- Occupations: Musician; songwriter; music publishing executive
- Years active: 1980–present
- Labels: Refuge; Sparrow; Reunion; UCA
- Formerly of: Outlaws
- Website: RickCua.com

Rick Cua (born December 3, 1948) is an American Christian rock singer, songwriter, bassist, author and ordained minister. He is a former member of the Southern rock band, Outlaws, whom he joined in 1980, but left in 1983 to pursue a full-time career in contemporary Christian music, the year after, wherein he gained popularity throughout most of the 1980s as a leather-jacket-wearing rocker with an arena rock sound featuring big, shout-along choruses.

== Background ==
After recording with Refuge and Sparrow records, he signed to Reunion in 1988, where his works began to take on a softer, more radio-friendly tone that included "sentimental ballads and pop-rock anthems in the style of Michael Bolton." Cua left Reunion in 1992 after just over a decade of radio airplay including six No. 1 Christian radio songs, creating his own label, UCA Records, on which he recorded three studio albums in the 1990s but received little radio play. He was nominated for a Dove Award and has received various other awards and recognition.

Cua took a hiatus from recording in 1998 and went to work as vice president of the creative department at EMI Christian Music Publishing, where he stayed until 2003. He focused on managing his own two companies: Rick Cua Entertainment, which manages artists and works in music publishing, film and TV licensing; and All for the King Music, offering coaching and inspiration to lay musicians through workshops and free electronic delivery of original worship music.

Celebrating his 25th year in ministry, Cua released his twelfth album, Won't Fade Away, in 2007. It was his first album in ten years.

Cua's father, his veteran guitar teacher, Basilio "Buz" Cua, died on May 19, 2009, at the age of 90 in his home town of Syracuse, New York. Cua was unable to go to his father's funeral, due to successful prostate cancer surgery.

== Discography ==
Koo-Ah (Recorded at Glaser Recording Studio and Lower Level Studio, Nashville, TN.)

- Released: 1982
- Label: Refuge
- Tracks: Ten
- Singles: You Can Still Rock 'n Roll (#1 Christian Radio Hit)

No Mystery (feat. Ian Bairnson on guitar)

- Released: 1983
- Label: Refuge

You're My Road

- Released: 1985
- Label: Sparrow
- Producer: Dave Perkins
- Singles: "You're My Road" and "Don't Say Suicide"

Wear Your Colors

- Released: 1986
- Label: Sparrow
- Producer: Dave Perkins
- Singles: "Wear Your Colors" and "This Raging Fire"

Can't Stand Too Tall

- Released: 1988
- Label: Reunion
- Producer: Tom Hemby
- Chart position: Reached No. 33 on Billboard's Top Contemporary Christian chart

Midnight Sun

- Released: 1989
- Label: Reunion
- Producer: Tom Hemby
- Chart position: Reached No. 29 on Billboard's Top Contemporary Christian chart
- Singles: "I'll Be Satisfied" and "Young Boy, Young Girl" (feat. Rebecca Sparks)

Within Reach

- Released: 1991
- Label: Reunion
- Producer: John Elefante, Dino Elefante
- Singles: "Message Of Love" and "Heaven Won't Stop The Rain"

The Way Love Is

- Released: 1992
- Label: Reunion
- Producer: Bill Cuomo, John Leslie Hug, Robert White Johnson,
- Singles: "What If?"

Songs to Live By

- Released: 1993
- Label: Reunion

Times Ten

- Released: 1995
- Label: UCA
- Producer: Rick Cua

Like A Cool Drink (with the Ah-Koo-Sticks)

- Released: 1997
- Label: UCA

Won't Fade Away

- Released: 2007
- Label: UCA
- Producer: Tony Morra
- Singles: "Won't Fade Away"
