= List of artists who have covered Van Morrison songs =

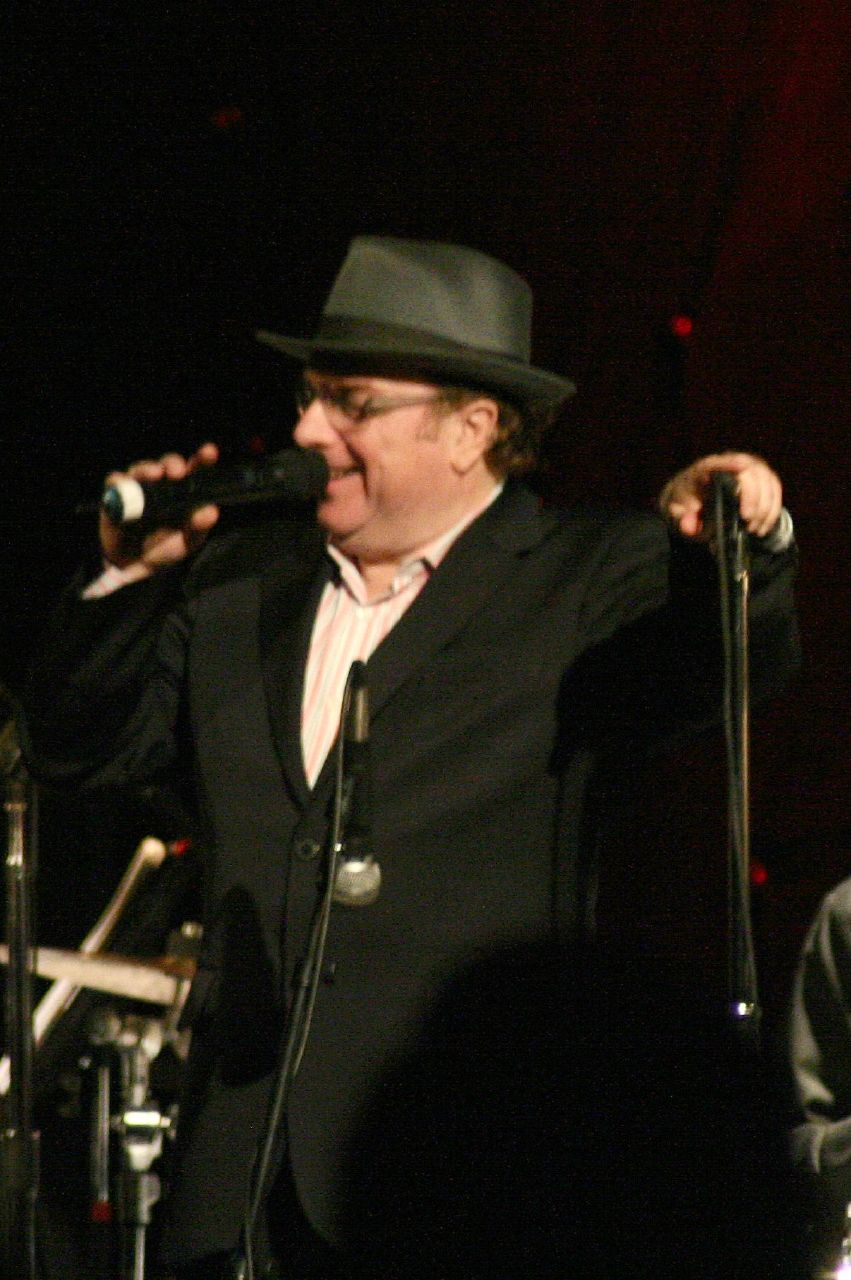

Van Morrison (born George Ivan Morrison on 31 August 1945) is a Northern Irish singer-songwriter who has been a professional musician since 1960. He has won six Grammy Awards and was inducted into the Songwriter's Hall of Fame in 2003. Morrison began to write and record his first original songs while frontman for the band Them and in the years since has written hundreds of songs, many of them covered by popular and major artists.

In 2012, Paste compiled a list of covers by Glen Hansard, Jeff Buckley, The Doors, Tom Petty and the Heartbreakers, Elvis Costello, Ben E. King, Solomon Burke, Michael Bublé, Sinéad O'Connor and Bruce Springsteen as their pick of the 10 Best Covers of Van Morrison Songs.

This article is a selective list of prominent musicians or entertainers who have recorded their own version of a song which Van Morrison originally wrote and recorded. There are also some notable or frequently performed live versions included.

== A ==
=== The Allman Brothers Band ===
- And It Stoned Me
- Into the Mystic

=== John Anderson ===
- Brown Eyed Girl

== B ==
=== Michael Ball ===
- Have I Told You Lately

=== The Band ===
- Caravan with Van Morrison – (The Last Waltz)
- 4% Pantomime (co-written with Robbie Robertson)

=== Eric Bell ===
- Gloria
- Madame George

=== Michael Bolton ===
- Crazy Love

=== Bon Jovi ===
- Gloria (Medley)

=== Boney M. ===
- I Shall Sing

=== Bono ===
- Moondance

=== Chris Botti ===
- Moondance

=== David Bowie ===
- Gloria

=== Greg Brown ===
- Moondance

=== Jackson Browne ===
- Into the Mystic

=== Michael Bublé ===
- Crazy Love
- Moondance

=== Jeff Buckley ===
- Madame George
- Sweet Thing
- The Way Young Lovers Do

=== Jimmy Buffett ===
- Brown Eyed Girl

=== Solomon Burke ===
- Fast Train
- Only a Dream

=== Sam Bush ===
- Hungry For Your Love

=== Busted ===
- Brown Eyed Girl

== C ==
=== David Campbell ===
- Jackie Wilson Said (I'm in Heaven When You Smile)

=== Kim Carnes ===
- Warm Love

=== Vikki Carr ===
- Crazy Love

=== Paul Carrack ===
- Crazy Love
- Into the Mystic

=== Dina Carroll ===
- Someone Like You

=== Jen Chapin ===
- Into the Mystic

=== Ray Charles duet with Van Morrison ===
- Crazy Love

=== C. J. Chenier ===
- Comfort You

=== The Chieftains with Van Morrison ===
- Boffyflow and Spike
- Celtic Ray
- Have I Told You Lately
- Irish Heartbeat

=== Joe Cocker ===
- Into the Mystic

=== Shawn Colvin ===
- Someone Like You

=== Billy Connolly ===
- Irish Heartbeat

=== Rita Coolidge ===
- Crazy Love

=== Elvis Costello ===
- Full Force Gale
- Wild Night

=== Counting Crows ===
- Caravan

=== Cristina ===
- Blue Money

=== Billy Ray Cyrus ===
- Brown Eyed Girl

== D ==
=== The Dead ===
- Gloria
- Into the Mystic

=== Dexys Midnight Runners ===
Jackie Wilson Said (I'm in Heaven When You Smile)

=== Jackie DeShannon ===
- And It Stoned Me
- Flamingos Fly
- I Wanna Roo You
- Santa Fe
- Sweet Sixteen co-written with Van Morrison
- The Wonder of You with Van Morrison

=== Bo Diddley ===
- I've Been Working

=== Cara Dillon ===
- Crazy Love

=== Joe Dolan ===
- Have I Told You Lately

=== Bob Dylan ===
- And It Stoned Me with Van Morrison
- Carrying a Torch
- Crazy Love with Van Morrison
- One Irish Rover with Van Morrison
- Foreign Window with Van Morrison
- Tupelo Honey
- Going Down to Bangor

== E ==
=== Pee Wee Ellis ===
- I Will Be There (with Van Morrison)

=== Energy Orchard ===
- Gloria
- Madame George
- One Two Brown Eyes (Van Morrison with Them song)

=== Everclear ===
- Brown Eyed Girl

== F ==
=== Marianne Faithfull ===
- Madame George

=== Georgie Fame ===
- Moondance

=== Chris Farlowe ===
- Sitting on Top of the World (with Van Morrison)

=== Bryan Ferry ===
- Crazy Love

=== Tom Fogerty ===
- Real Real Gone

== G ==
=== Jerry Garcia Band ===
- And It Stoned Me
- Bright Side of the Road
- Crazy Love
- He Ain't Give You None
- Tupelo Honey

=== Art Garfunkel ===
- I Shall Sing

=== Kathie Lee Gifford ===
- Moondance

=== Gov't Mule ===
- And It Stoned Me

=== Grateful Dead ===
- Gloria

=== Green Day ===
- Brown Eyed Girl

== H ==
=== Sammy Hagar ===
- Flamingos Fly

=== Richie Havens ===
- Tupelo Honey
- Wild Night

=== Goldie Hawn ===
- I Wanna Roo You

=== Roy Head ===
- Bit By Bit
- You've Got the Power

=== Jimi Hendrix ===
- Gloria

=== Robyn Hitchcock ===
- Fair Play (live)
- Linden Arden Stole the Highlights (live)

=== John Lee Hooker ===
- T.B. Sheets
- The Healing Game with Van Morrison
- Gloria with Van Morrison

=== Hothouse Flowers ===
- Bright Side of the Road

=== Engelbert Humperdinck ===
- Have I Told You Lately

== I ==
=== Iggy Pop ===
- Gloria
- One Two Brown Eyes (Van Morrison with Them song)

== J ==
=== Colin James ===
- Into the Mystic
- I Will Be There
- It Fills You Up

=== Aled Jones ===
- Whenever God Shines His Light

=== Paul Jones ===
- Philosopher's Stone

=== Rickie Lee Jones ===
- Gloria

=== Tom Jones ===
- Carrying a Torch
- I'm Not Feeling It Anymore
- It Must Be You
- Some Peace of Mind
- Sometimes We Cry with Van Morrison

== K ==
=== Phil Keaggy ===
- When Will I Ever Learn To Live in God

=== Ronan Keating ===
- Brown Eyed Girl

=== Brian Kennedy ===
- Crazy Love
- Irish Heartbeat with Shana Morrison
- Queen of the Slipstream

=== Ben E. King ===
- Into the Mystic

== L ==
=== Frankie Laine ===
- Brand New Day

=== Bettye Lavette ===
- Real Real Gone

=== Ute Lemper ===
- Moondance

=== Jerry Lee Lewis with Don Henley ===
- What Makes the Irish Heart Beat

=== Ramsey Lewis and Nancy Wilson ===
- Moondance

== M ==
=== Miriam Makeba ===
- Brand New Day
- I Shall Sing

=== Barry Manilow ===
- Have I Told You Lately

=== Barbara Mandrell ===
- Have I Told You Lately

=== Martina McBride ===
- Wild Night

=== Michael McDonald ===
- Into the Mystic

=== Bobby McFerrin ===
- Moondance

=== Maria McKee ===
- My Lonely Sad Eyes
- The Way Young Lovers Do

=== Brian McKnight ===
- Crazy Love

=== John Mellencamp ===
- Wild Night

=== Jonathan Rhys Meyers ===
- Moondance

=== James Morrison ===
- And It Stoned Me

=== Jim Morrison with The Doors ===
- Gloria

=== Bill Murray with Eric Clapton ===
- Gloria (Crossroads Guitar Festival – 2007)

== N ==
=== Aaron Neville and Robbie Robertson ===
- Crazy Love

=== Liam Neeson ===
- Coney Island

=== Ted Nugent ===
- Gloria

== O ==
=== Sinéad O'Connor ===
- Have I Told You Lately with Van Morrison and The Chieftains
- You Make Me Feel So Free

== P ==
=== Robert Pattinson ===
- I'll Be Your Lover, Too

=== Tom Petty and the Heartbreakers ===
- Gloria
- I'm Tired Joey Boy
- Mystic Eyes

=== Esther Phillips ===
- Brand New Day
- Crazy Love
- Into the Mystic

== R ==
=== Della Reese ===
- Have I Told You Lately

=== Martha Reeves ===
- Wild Night

=== Helen Reddy ===
- Crazy Love

=== Buddy Rich ===
- Domino

=== Cliff Richard ===
- Whenever God Shines His Light with Van Morrison

=== Johnny Rivers ===
- Brown Eyed Girl
- Into the Mystic
- Slim Slo Slider
- Wild Night
- Songwriter

=== Kenny Rogers ===
- Have I Told You Lately

== S ==
=== Bob Seger ===
- I've Been Working

=== Bon Scott with The Spektors ===
- Gloria

=== Shakira ===
- Bright Side of the Road – (President Barack Obama's Neighborhood Ball, 2009)

=== Patti Smith ===
- Gloria

=== Phoebe Snow ===
- Madame George

=== Dusty Springfield ===
- Tupelo Honey

=== Rick Springfield ===
- Gloria

=== Bruce Springsteen ===
- Brown Eyed Girl
- Gloria

=== Joe Stampley ===
- Brown Eyed Girl

=== Lisa Stansfield ===
- Friday's Child (Van Morrison with Them Song)

=== Steel Pulse ===
- Brown Eyed Girl

=== Rod Stewart ===
- Crazy Love
- Have I Told You Lately

=== The Swell Season (Glen Hansard with Markéta Irglová) ===
- And the Healing Has Begun (Glen Hansard)
- Astral Weeks
- Into the Mystic (Glen Hansard with Markéta Irglová)
- Sweet Thing

== T ==
=== 13th Floor Elevators ===
- Gloria

=== Grady Tate ===
- Moondance

=== Corey Taylor ===
- I'll Be Your Lover, Too

=== Toots and the Maytals ===
- I Shall Sing

== U ==
=== U2 ===
- Brown Eyed Girl
- Gloria
- Into the Mystic
- Moondance

== W ==
=== The Wallflowers ===
- Into the Mystic

=== The Waterboys ===
- And the Healing Has Begun
- Sweet Thing

=== Russell Watson ===
- Have I Told You Lately

=== Widespread Panic ===
- And It Stoned Me
- Send Your Mind

=== Andy Williams ===
- Have I Told You Lately (also live at the Royal Albert Hall, 2007)

=== Vanessa L. Williams ===
- Someone Like You

=== Cassandra Wilson ===
- Tupelo Honey

== Z ==
=== Warren Zevon ===
- Into the Mystic

== Unreleased songs covered by other artists ==
=== Solomon Burke ===
- At the Crossroads

=== Tom Fogerty ===
- You Move Me

=== Johnny Winter ===
- Feedback Out on Highway 101
