= Caravan (Van Morrison song) =

Song by Van Morrison

from the album Moondance
- Released: February 1970
- Recorded: 30 July 1969
- Studio: Mastertone Studios
- Genre: Rock; folk rock; R&B
- Length: 4:57
- Label: Warner Bros. Records
- Songwriter: Van Morrison
- Producers: Van Morrison and Lewis Merenstein

Moondance track listing
- 10 tracks Side one: 1. "And It Stoned Me"; 2. "Moondance"; 3. "Crazy Love"; 4. "Caravan"; 5. "Into the Mystic"; Side two: 6. "Come Running"; 7. "These Dreams of You"; 8. "Brand New Day"; 9. "Everyone"; 10. "Glad Tidings"

Official audio
- "Caravan" (2013 Remaster) on YouTube

"Caravan" is a song written by Northern Irish singer-songwriter Van Morrison and included on his 1970 album, Moondance. It was a concert highlight for several years and was included as one of the songs on Morrison's 1974 acclaimed live album, It's Too Late to Stop Now.

It was also performed by Morrison with The Band in the 1978 film by Martin Scorsese entitled The Last Waltz, which commemorates The Band's last concert appearance together before they stopped touring, on Thanksgiving Day 1976.

== Recording and composition ==
"Caravan" was recorded on 30 July 1969 at Mastertone Studios in New York City with Lewis Merenstein as producer.

The theme of the song is about gypsy life and the radio which are both images of harmony. Music critic Johnny Rogan described it as "a romantic portrayal of gypsy life and a testimony to [Morrison's] love of radio." Van Morrison also based the song on real memories while living in a rural house in Woodstock, New York, where the nearest house was far down the road.

He described why he included the reference to radio in the song:

I could hear the radio like it was in the same room. I don't know how to explain it. There was some story about an underground passage under the house I was living in, rumours from kids and stuff and I was beginning to think it was true. How can you hear someone's radio from a mile away, as if it was playing in your own house? So I had to put that into the song, It was a must.

In Rogan's opinion, "Caravan" contains some of Morrison's "most attractive vocal dynamics."

== Nick Hornby on "Caravan" ==
In his book, Songbook, about his 31 favourite songs, Nick Hornby names "Caravan" from the live album, It's Too Late to Stop Now as the song he wants played at his funeral. He writes that "in the long, vamped passage right before the climax Morrison's band seems to isolate a moment somewhere between life and its aftermath, a big, baroque entrance hall of a place where you can stop and think about everything that has gone before." Then he humorously realizes that this is also the place where Morrison introduces the band and wonders how the mourners will feel about hearing all the unknown people's names being called out as they file out of the funeral, but says "I'm not changing my mind, so there."

== In the media and acclaim ==
"Caravan" was played during a season three episode of The West Wing ("We Killed Yamamoto"). In the "Young Master Carlson" episode in season 1 of WKRP in Cincinnati, it is the song that Dr. Johnny Fever is playing and singing along to.

Counting Crows appeared in place of the absent Morrison at his 1993 induction into the Rock and Roll Hall of Fame and performed the song "Caravan" which was an appearance that first brought the band to public notice.

When asked about his enjoyment performing in The Last Waltz, Eric Clapton commented that "For me, Muddy [Waters] and Van [Morrison] steal the show. Van doing ["Caravan"] with the leg kicks. Some of the greatest live music you'll ever see."

It was listed as No. 254 on the All Time 885 Greatest Songs compiled in 2004 by WXPN from listener's votes.

== Other releases ==
"Caravan" was one of the live performances recorded and included on Morrison's 1974 acclaimed live album, It's Too Late to Stop Now. A live version of the song was featured on Morrison's second video Van Morrison: The Concert, released in 1990. The live version in audio only taken from The Last Waltz was included in Van Morrison's 2007 compilation album, Van Morrison at the Movies – Soundtrack Hits.

== Covers ==
The band Counting Crows filled in for Van Morrison at his 1993 induction ceremony at the Rock and Roll Hall of Fame and performed "Caravan".

Irish musician Hozier covered “Caravan” as part of “Rave On, Van Morrison”, in celebration of the work of the legendary Irish songwriter, curated by Hot Press magazine, to mark Van's 75th birthday in 2020.

== Personnel ==
- Van Morrison – vocals
- John Klingberg – bass guitar
- Jef Labes – piano
- Gary Mallaber – drums
- John Platania – guitar
- Jack Schroer – alto saxophone
- Collin Tilton – tenor saxophone
