= Moondance (Van Morrison song) =

Single by Van Morrison

from the album Moondance
- B-side: "Cold Wind in August"
- Released: January 1970 (album); September 1977 (single)
- Recorded: August 1969
- Studio: A & R Studios
- Genre: Soft rock; R&B; jazz rock
- Length: 4:35
- Label: Warner Bros.
- Songwriter: Van Morrison
- Producers: Van Morrison and Lewis Merenstein

Moondance track listing
- 10 tracks Side one: 1. "And It Stoned Me"; 2. "Moondance"; 3. "Crazy Love"; 4. "Caravan"; 5. "Into the Mystic"; Side two: 6. "Come Running"; 7. "These Dreams of You"; 8. "Brand New Day"; 9. "Everyone"; 10. "Glad Tidings"

Official audio
- "Moondance" (2013 Remaster) on YouTube

"Moondance" is a song recorded by Northern Irish singer and songwriter Van Morrison and is the title song on his third studio album Moondance (1970). It was written by Morrison, and produced by Morrison and Lewis Merenstein.

Morrison did not release the song as a single until September 1977, seven and a half years after the album was released. It debuted two months later where it reached #92, on the US Billboard Hot 100 and #91 on the US Cash Box Top 100 The single's B-side, "Cold Wind in August", had been released in the same year, on his latest album at the time, A Period of Transition.

"Moondance" is the song that Van Morrison plays most frequently in concert.

== Composition and recording ==
"Moondance" was recorded at the Mastertone Studio in New York City in August 1969, with Lewis Merenstein as producer.

The song is played mostly acoustic, anchored by a walking bass line (played on electric bass by John Klingberg), with accompaniment by piano, guitar, saxophones, and flute with the instruments played with a soft jazz swing. It's a song about autumn, the composer's favourite season. Towards the end of the song, Morrison imitates a saxophone. The song also features a piano solo, played by Jef Labes, which is immediately followed by an alto saxophone solo by Jack Schroer. The song ends with a trill on the flute during the cadenza that fades out. Schroer's solo is often noted as one of the most influential saxophone solos in popular music. The scale used in Schroer's "Moondance" solo is A Aeolian (A, B, C, D, E, F, G) or could simply be considered as a C major scale and is played primarily over a D minor to A minor vamp that resolves via a lowered VI (♭6 = F^{7}) to natural V (5 = E^{7♯9}) dominant chord.

Music journalist Erik Hage wrote that the significance of the song "lies in its direct jazz approach", expanding that observation with "Astral Weeks had suggestions of jazz, but this song would take the genre head on. It would become Van Morrison's most successful and definitive jazz composition." Music critic Johnny Rogan described "Moondance" as a "celebration of nature," "expressed through a lovers' union in the night air."

"Moondance" was written and developed while Morrison was living in Cambridge, Massachusetts. He has commented, "With 'Moondance' I wrote the melody first. I played the melody on a soprano sax and I knew I had a song so I wrote lyrics to go with the melody. That's the way I wrote that one. I don't really have any words to particularly describe the song, sophisticated is probably the word I'm looking for. For me, 'Moondance' is a sophisticated song. Frank Sinatra wouldn't be out of place singing that."

The guitar player in his band at that time, John Sheldon, remembers that during the summer of 1968, at a rehearsal, the band was fooling around with a Broadway tune called “Lazy Afternoon” released in 1967 in a jazz version by Grant Green. Morrison requested some changes and began singing a melody that would eventually become "Moondance."

== Structure ==
Moondance basically consists of a 16 bar verse and a 16 bar bridge. The intro and verse feature a traditional jazz style walking bass. The sections marked verse and bridge can mostly be considered as one 32 bar unit which repeats four times.

- Intro – 4 bars of instrumental vamp with walking bass
- Unit 1 – vocals on verse and bridge
- Unit 2 – vocals on verse and bridge
- Unit 3 – piano solo on verse, sax solo on bridge
- Unit 4 – vocals on verse and bridge
- Outro – vocals on 1 ½ of the verse (12 bars), then proceed to the final four bar ending.

Intro:
  | Amin Bmin | % | % | % |

Verse:
  | Amin Bmin | % | % | % | % | % | % | % | 
  | Amin Bmin | % | % | % | % | % | % | % | 

Bridge:
  | Dmin | Amin | Dmin | A min | Dmin | Amin | Dmin | E7 |
  | Amin D | % | % | % | % | % | % | Amin E7 |

Outro:
  ||: Amin Bmin | % | % | % :||  (repeat 3 times for 12 bars total)
  | Amin G | F Emin | Dmin| Amin |

== Other releases ==
"Moondance" as originally recorded on the album Moondance is one of the songs on the compilation album, The Best of Van Morrison, released in 1990 and also on the compilation album Still on Top – The Greatest Hits, released in 2007. Several live performances have been released by Morrison on albums over the years.

A medley with "My Funny Valentine" appears on the 1994 live double album A Night in San Francisco, a live be-bop influenced version of the song is on the 1996 album How Long Has This Been Going On, and is performed with Georgie Fame at the Ronnie Scott's Jazz Club. An edit of said version is also included on the 2007 compilation album The Best of Van Morrison Volume 3. Another live version appears on the 2006 limited edition CD Live at Austin City Limits Festival. A previously unreleased live recording of "Moondance", recorded at the Greek Theatre in 1986, with a recreation of The Caledonia Soul Orchestra is included on the 2007 compilation album, Van Morrison at the Movies - Soundtrack Hits.

"Moondance" was one of the songs performed on Morrison's first video Van Morrison in Ireland, released in 1981, and it also was performed as a medley with "Fever" for Morrison's second video Van Morrison The Concert, released in 1990. Morrison also released a live version of "Moondance" as the 10th song performed on the 1980 disc of Morrison's DVD released in 2006, Live At Montreux 1980/1974.

The subject of whether the melody of UB40's song Burden of Shame (from the 1980 album Signing Off) is based on Moondance has been debated. Morrison's name was, at one point, added to the list of the "many authors" of the song, but by 2010 it had vanished.

== Critical response ==
The Allmusic reviewer Tom Maginnis describes "Moondance" as "one of those rare songs that manages to implant itself on the collective consciousness of popular music, passing into the hallowed territory of a standard, a classic."

Biographer John Collis praised the song for being more commercially accessible for most radio stations than a lot of his earlier work. He calls "Moondance" "an important song in the development of Morrison's career, since it indicated to radio station programmers a previously unsuspected versatility. Stations that would never have considered playing, say 'Slim Slow Slider' found that the smooth, jazzy sophistication of 'Moondance' was more to their taste."

"Moondance" was listed as #226 in Rolling Stone magazine's December 2004 feature "The 500 Greatest Songs of All Time". It is also one of The Rock and Roll Hall of Fame's 500 Songs that Shaped Rock and Roll.

The 1970 album release of the song was inducted into the Grammy Hall of Fame in 1990.

== In popular culture ==
"Moondance" is one of the moon-themed songs used in An American Werewolf in London, a comedy-horror film released in 1981.

== Personnel ==
- Van Morrison – vocals, guitar
- John Klingberg – bass guitar
- Jeff Labes – piano
- Gary Mallaber – drums
- John Platania – guitar
- Jack Schroer – alto saxophone
- Collin Tilton – tenor saxophone, flute

== Certifications ==
Region	Certification	Certified units/sales
New Zealand (RMNZ)	Platinum	30,000^{‡}
United Kingdom (BPI)	Gold	400,000^{‡}
^{‡} Sales+streaming figures based on certification alone.

== Covers ==
There have been many recorded versions of the song and it is also a very popularly performed instrumental band song. "Moondance" is the opening tune on I Feel You, the 2011 album released by Herb Alpert and Lani Hall. Covers by Jonathan Rhys Meyers and Chris Botti were featured on the 2007 movie August Rush. Michael Bublé released a cover on his self-titled album in 2003. Ramsey Lewis and Nancy Wilson covered "Moondance" on the 2002 album Meant to Be. Other covers by notable musicians and entertainers include: Greg Brown, Georgie Fame, Kathie Lee Gifford, and Ute Lemper.

== Sources ==
- Collis, John (1996). Inarticulate Speech of the Heart, Little Brown and Company, ISBN 0-306-80811-0
- Hage, Erik (2009). The Words and Music of Van Morrison, Praeger Publishers, ISBN 978-0-313-35862-3
- Heylin, Clinton (2003). Can You Feel the Silence? Van Morrison: A New Biography, Chicago Review Press, ISBN 1-55652-542-7
- Hinton, Brian (1997). Celtic Crossroads: The Art of Van Morrison, Sanctuary, ISBN 1-86074-169-X
