= Everyone (Van Morrison song) =

Song by Van Morrison

from the album Moondance
- Released: February 1970
- Genre: Baroque pop
- Length: 3:31
- Label: Warner Bros. Records
- Songwriter: Van Morrison
- Producers: Van Morrison and Lewis Merenstein

Moondance track listing
- 10 tracks Side one: 1. "And It Stoned Me"; 2. "Moondance"; 3. "Crazy Love"; 4. "Caravan"; 5. "Into the Mystic"; Side two: 6. "Come Running"; 7. "These Dreams of You"; 8. "Brand New Day"; 9. "Everyone"; 10. "Glad Tidings"

"Everyone" is the penultimate track on Van Morrison's 1970 album Moondance.

The song is the fastest on the album. It is in 12/8 time and features more prominent acoustic guitar than other tracks on Moondance where the piano is the main instrument. A notable feature of the intro is a clavinet. A hard but sparse drumbeat is offset by a melody played on the flute throughout the song, including a solo after the second chorus.

Morrison has said "'Everyone' is just a song of hope, that's what that is."

The song was used for the final shot of the film The Royal Tenenbaums, but did not appear on any of the film's soundtrack releases.

== Personnel on original release ==
- Van Morrison – vocals
- John Klingberg – bass
- Jeff Labes – clavinet
- Gary Mallaber – drums
- John Platania – guitar
- Jack Schroer – soprano saxophone
- Collin Tilton – flute
