= Come Running =

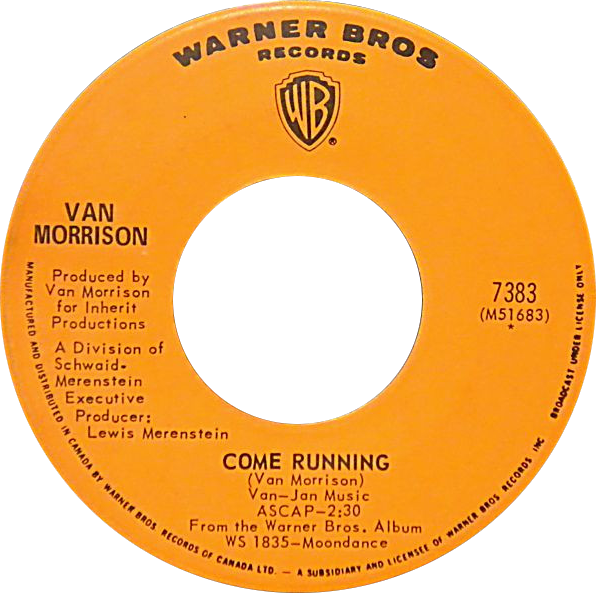
- A track label of Canadian single

Single by Van Morrison

from the album Moondance
- A-side: "Come Running"
- B-side: "Crazy Love"
- Released: 1970
- Recorded: A&R Recording, New York City
- Length: 2:30
- Label: Warner Bros.
- Songwriter: Van Morrison
- Producers: Van Morrison and Lewis Merenstein

Van Morrison singles chronology
"Spanish Rose" (1967)	"Come Running" (1970)	"Crazy Love" (1970)

Moondance track listing
- 10 tracks Side one: 1. "And It Stoned Me"; 2. "Moondance"; 3. "Crazy Love"; 4. "Caravan"; 5. "Into the Mystic"; Side two: 6. "Come Running"; 7. "These Dreams of You"; 8. "Brand New Day"; 9. "Everyone"; 10. "Glad Tidings"

"Come Running" is a song written by singer-songwriter Van Morrison and included on his 1970 album Moondance.

"Come Running" was also the only song to survive the Astral Weeks demos for Warner Bros. in 1968.

== Recording ==
The song was first recorded at the Warners Publishing Studio, New York in early 1969 with Morrison's producer at the time, Lewis Merenstein. It was then rerecorded in both the spring and summer sessions in the same year, before Morrison returned to the track in the September to November sessions at the A&R Recording Studios, 46th Street, New York, that resulted in the recording of most of the tracks that were released on Moondance.

== Composition ==
"Come Running" is composed in the key of A major, with a chord progression of A-D-A-D-A-D-A-D-A-D-A-E-D, which changes at the coda to A-F♯m-A-D-F♯m-Bm-D-A. The song has a bright rock tempo in 4/4 time, which slows at the three bar coda.

Morrison described it as "a very light type of song. It's not too heavy. It's just a happy-go-lucky song. There are no messages or anything like that." Brian Hinton's interpretation of the song was more complex: "The imagery is just like that at the end of "Madame George", a train passing, wind and rain ... an image of implacable nature against which human life and death play out their little games. Van and his lover 'dream that it will never end' while knowing that of course it will. Even the injunction to 'put away all your walking shoes' has a temporary sound to it."

The lyrics "you come running to me, you'll come running to me" were later reused in the 1987 track "Queen of the Slipstream".

== Single release ==
Billboard reviewed the single, calling it "a powerful performance that is sure to prove an immediate top of the chart winner. Performance and original material are topnotch and sure to bring Morrison back to the charts in a hurry." Cash Box said that "with further inventiveness, Morrison comes up with a bright side that has already made inroads on the AM & FM playlists."

Biographer Clinton Heylin remarked that "the lower rung chart success of the "Come Running" 45 hardly accounts for the album's [Moondance] immediate acceptance by a whole new spectrum of young adult listeners." The single peaked at number 39 on the Billboard Hot 100 singles chart.

== Personnel ==
- Van Morrison – tambourine, vocals
- John Klingberg – bass
- Jeff Labes – piano
- Gary Mallaber – drums
- Guy Masson – conga
- John Platania – guitar
- Jack Schroer – alto saxophone
- Collin Tilton – tenor saxophone
