= Crazy Love (Van Morrison song) =

1970 single by Van Morrison

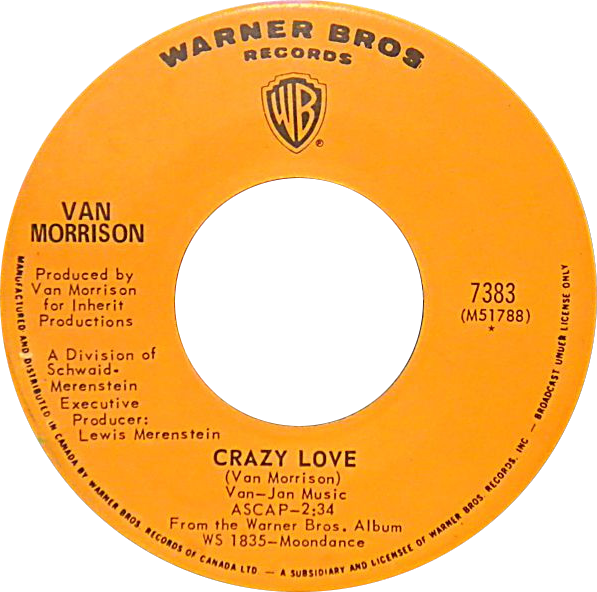
- A track label of the Canadian single

Single by Van Morrison

from the album Moondance
- B-side: "Come Running"
- Released: April 1970
- Recorded: August–November 1969
- Genre: Blue-eyed soul
- Length: 2:34
- Label: Warner Bros.
- Songwriter: Van Morrison
- Producers: Van Morrison and Lewis Merenstein

Van Morrison singles chronology
"Come Running" (1970)	"Crazy Love" (1970)	"Domino" (1970)

Moondance track listing
- 10 tracks Side one: 1. "And It Stoned Me"; 2. "Moondance"; 3. "Crazy Love"; 4. "Caravan"; 5. "Into the Mystic"; Side two: 6. "Come Running"; 7. "These Dreams of You"; 8. "Brand New Day"; 9. "Everyone"; 10. "Glad Tidings"

"Crazy Love" is a romantic ballad written by Northern Irish singer-songwriter Van Morrison and included on his 1970 album, Moondance. The song was originally released as the B-side to "Come Running" in May 1970 before it was released as a single in the Netherlands, "Come Running" as the B-side. The cover of the single shows Morrison with his then-wife, Janet "Planet" Rigsbee. The photograph was taken by Elliot Landy, the official photographer of the 1969 Woodstock festival.

== Duets with Van Morrison ==
Ray Charles introduced Van Morrison by starting the first verse before Van's appearance when he was inducted into the Songwriter's Hall of Fame in 2003. Morrison and Charles then finished with a duet of "Crazy Love". Ray Charles remarked about this performance: "It meant a lot to sing 'Crazy Love' on stage that evening." Genius Loves Company, Ray Charles' 2004 album, includes this duet featuring the two singers. Van Morrison and Bob Dylan sang a duet of "Crazy Love" on the BBC film, One Irish Rover in 1991.

== Reception ==
"Crazy Love" was listed as No. 198 on the All Time 885 Greatest Songs compiled in 2004 by WXPN from listener's votes.

== Other releases ==
The duet featuring Ray Charles and Van Morrison as performed at the 2003 SHOF awards is one of the 31 songs on the compilation album The Best of Van Morrison Volume 3 released in 2007. The original version from Moondance is one of the hits included on the 2007 compilation album, Still on Top - The Greatest Hits.

== Notable cover versions ==
"Crazy Love" has been performed by many artists. Versions by Brian Kennedy, Aaron Neville and Robbie Robertson were featured in films. Helen Reddy had considerable chart success with the song as she scored her first Adult Contemporary Billboard Top 10 hit with her cover version released in July 1971. The highest charting version of “Crazy Love” came in 1995 from R&B singer Brian McKnight, whose cover was a Top 10 hit on Billboard’s R&B Chart, and peaked at #45 on the Hot 100.

In 1986, British reggae artist Maxi Priest got together with Drummie Zeb, Brinsley Forde and Tony Gad of Aswad, chanteuse Carroll Thompson, (aka "Queen of Lovers Rock" ), Barry Boom, Mafia & Fluxy and Trevor Hartley of Burning Rockers with Godwin Logie on the mixing desk to create their own version of "Crazy Love", which was released as a single, and also featured on Priest's album, Intentions.

Bryan Ferry recorded a cover version for the "She's Having A Baby" soundtrack. It's also on his compilation album "Slave to Love: Best of the Ballads".

== Personnel ==
- Van Morrison – vocals
- John Klingberg – bass guitar
- Jeff Labes – piano
- Gary Mallaber – drums, vibraphone
- John Platania – guitar
- Judy Clay – background vocals
- Emily Houston – background vocals
- Jackie Verdell – background vocals

== Certifications ==
Certifications for "Crazy Love"
Region	Certification	Certified units/sales
New Zealand (RMNZ)	Platinum	30,000^{‡}
^{‡} Sales+streaming figures based on certification alone.

== Michael Bublé version ==
"Crazy Love"

Single by Michael Bublé

from the album Crazy Love
- B-side: "Pennies from Heaven"
- Released: 16 May 2010
- Recorded: 2009–2010
- Genre: Jazz, pop
- Length: 3:31
- Label: 143 Records, Reprise
- Songwriter: Van Morrison

Michael Bublé singles chronology
"Cry Me a River" (2010)	"Crazy Love" (2010)	"Hollywood" (2010)

Music video
- "Michael Bublé - Crazy Love (Official Music Video) | Warner Vault" on YouTube

"Crazy Love" was later covered by Canadian singer Michael Bublé, and released as the fourth single from his fourth studio album, Crazy Love (2009). The single was released on 29 June 2010, accompanied by a number of bonus tracks and mixes from the album.

=== Background ===
The single was released on 16 May 2010, accompanied by the bonus tracks "Pennies from Heaven", originally an iTunes Store bonus track on Crazy Love, "Relax Max", featuring Naturally 7, an Amazon exclusive bonus track on Crazy Love, and an instrumental version of "Haven't Met You Yet". The release was accompanied by a music video for the track, again directed by Rich Lee. The video premiered on YouTube on 1 May 2010.

=== Track listing ===
- Digital download
1. "Crazy Love" – 3:31
2. "Pennies from Heaven" – 3:15
3. "Relax Max" (featuring Naturally 7) – 3:29
4. "Haven't Met You Yet" (Instrumental) – 4:05
- Promotional CD single
1. "Crazy Love" (Edit) – 3:08

=== Charts ===
Chart (2010)	Peak position
UK Singles Chart	122

== Certifications ==
Region	Certification	Certified units/sales
United Kingdom (BPI) 2005 release	Silver	200,000^{‡}
^{‡} Sales+streaming figures based on certification alone.
