= Glad Tidings (song) =

Song by Van Morrison

from the album Moondance
- Released: February 1970
- Recorded: September–November 1969, A&R Recording Studios, New York City
- Genre: R&B; jazz; soul
- Length: 3:42
- Label: Warner Bros. Records
- Songwriter(s): Van Morrison
- Producer(s): Van Morrison and Lewis Merenstein

Moondance track listing
- 10 tracks Side one: 1. "And It Stoned Me"; 2. "Moondance"; 3. "Crazy Love"; 4. "Caravan"; 5. "Into the Mystic"; Side two: 6. "Come Running"; 7. "These Dreams of You"; 8. "Brand New Day"; 9. "Everyone"; 10. "Glad Tidings"

"Glad Tidings" is the tenth and final song on Northern Irish singer-songwriter Van Morrison's 1970 album Moondance.

== Recording and composition ==
"Glad Tidings" was the final song recorded on the Moondance sessions from September to November 1969 at the A&R Recording Studios in New York City with Elliott Scheiner as engineer.

Van Morrison gave the origins of the song's composition, remarking that "Glad Tidings" is about a period of time in which he was living in New York City. A friend of his wrote him a letter from London and he'd written on the envelope 'Glad Tidings from London'. He wrote 'Glad Tidings' from New York back – and that's where he got the idea.

Allmusic describes it as a "brisk shot of R&B, worthy of any Stax artist or sounds that were emanating from Muscle Shoals during the mid '60s, with a bopping bass line, lively horn section, and rock-steady groove." The review goes on to say that "The horn section delivers the song's main melodic hook, punching up the chorus with accent lines supporting Morrison's infectious harmonies."

Brian Hinton, in reviewing the song notes that "Glad Tidings" seemed to be addressing some of the issues that Morrison had experienced a few years before with Bert Berns and the record label Bang Records: "businessmen talking in numbers, people who interrupt 'when you're in trances', strangers who 'make demands'.... even the opening line and closing line, 'and they'll lay you down low and easy', could be either about murder or an act of love."

== In the media ==
"Glad Tidings" was used on "All Due Respect", the final episode of the fifth season of The Sopranos. In a review of that last episode, The Star Ledger states: "The episode's use of Van Morrison's "Glad Tidings" as a recurring motif was a classic example of the show's attention to detail. Moments before buckshot fired by cousin Anthony "Tony" Soprano hit Anthony "Tony B" Blundetto, we heard the verse that opened with "And we'll send you glad tidings from New York" and closed with "Hope that you will come right in on time."

== Personnel ==
- Van Morrison – vocals, guitar
- John Klingberg – bass guitar
- Jef Labes – organ
- Gary Mallaber – drums
- John Platania – guitar
- Jack Schroer – alto saxophone
- Collin Tilton – tenor saxophone
