= These Dreams of You =

Song by Van Morrison

from the album Moondance
- Released: February 1970
- Genre: Rhythm and blues, country rock
- Length: 3:50
- Label: Warner Bros. Records
- Songwriter(s): Van Morrison
- Producer(s): Van Morrison and Lewis Merenstein

Moondance track listing
- 10 tracks Side one: 1. "And It Stoned Me"; 2. "Moondance"; 3. "Crazy Love"; 4. "Caravan"; 5. "Into the Mystic"; Side two: 6. "Come Running"; 7. "These Dreams of You"; 8. "Brand New Day"; 9. "Everyone"; 10. "Glad Tidings"

"These Dreams of You" is a song written by the Northern Irish singer-songwriter Van Morrison on his 1970 album Moondance. It was also included on his 1974 live album, It's Too Late to Stop Now.

"The inspiration of "These Dreams of You", it seems, was a dream about an assassination attempt on Ray Charles, who then 'got up to do his best'. The words are introspective and obscure, but the musical structure and assured playing give the piece its necessary coherence."

Van Morrison describes it as:

The result of a dream I had about Ray Charles being shot down. That started off the whole song. The line 'you paid your dues in Canada', I don't really know where that comes from, I just have a romantic image of going to Canada and that's about it. The song is basically about dreams.

Brian Hinton goes on to say, "Nightmares more like, with Van's lover telling lies, walking out, ignoring his cries, throwing him out, and slapping him on the face; odd behavior for an angel. Van's voice sounds almost strangled on the final chorus."

== Appearance on other albums ==
- A live version was included in the 1974 double live album It's Too Late to Stop Now.

== Filmed performances ==
- There is footage of the song being performed at the Fillmore East on 23 September 1970.
- A performance of the song, with special guest Fred Wesley, was shown on the 1998 Rockpalast Christmas special on German television.

== Personnel on original release ==
- Van Morrison – vocals, harmonica
- John Klingberg – bass guitar
- Jeff Labes – organ
- Gary Mallaber – drums
- John Platania – guitar
- Jack Schroer – alto saxophone
- Collin Tilton – tenor saxophone
