= And It Stoned Me =

1970 song by Van Morrison

Song by Van Morrison

from the album Moondance
- Released: February 1970
- Recorded: Summer 1969, Warner Publishing Studio, New York City
- Genre: Rock; R&B; folk rock
- Length: 4:30
- Label: Warner Bros.
- Songwriter: Van Morrison
- Producers: Van Morrison and Lewis Merenstein

Official Audio
- "And It Stoned Me" on YouTube

Moondance track listing
- 10 tracks Side one: 1. "And It Stoned Me"; 2. "Moondance"; 3. "Crazy Love"; 4. "Caravan"; 5. "Into the Mystic"; Side two: 6. "Come Running"; 7. "These Dreams of You"; 8. "Brand New Day"; 9. "Everyone"; 10. "Glad Tidings"

"And It Stoned Me" is a song by Northern Irish singer-songwriter Van Morrison. It is the opening track on his 1970 solo album, Moondance.

== Composition and recording ==
"And It Stoned Me" was recorded in summer 1969 at Warner Publishing Studio in New York City.

As Morrison biographer Ritchie Yorke described it, the song remembered "how it was when you were a kid and just got stoned from nature and you didn't need anything else". Morrison, in 1985, related the song to a quasi-mystical experience he had as a child:

I suppose I was about 12 years old. We used to go to a place called Ballystockart to fish. We stopped in the village on the way up to this place and I went to this little stone house, and there was an old man there with dark weather-beaten skin, and we asked him if he had any water. He gave us some water which he said he'd got from the stream. We drank some and everything seemed to stop for me. Time stood still. For five minutes everything was really quiet and I was in this 'other dimension'. That's what the song is about.

Music critic Johnny Rogan describes "And It Stoned Me" as "a wonderfully understated remembrance" of that experience, with "no pat moralizing or sentimentality."

During this song Morrison sings: "...Stoned me just like Jelly Roll. And it stoned me." That lyric is thought to be a reference to jazz musician Jelly Roll Morton, whose recordings Morrison listened to with his father as he was growing up.

== Covers ==
The song has been covered by Jackie DeShannon, Bob Dylan (with Van Morrison), Zero, Jerry Garcia, James Morrison, Widespread Panic, Gov't Mule, David Gray, The Allman Brothers Band, John Mayer, Passenger, and Joe Higgs.

The original recording of the song was re-released on The Best of Van Morrison and Still on Top - The Greatest Hits. "And It Stoned Me" is performed by Morrison on the 1980 segment of his 2006 2-disc DVD, Live at Montreux 1980/1974.

== Personnel ==
- Van Morrison – vocals, guitar
- John Klingberg – bass guitar
- Jef Labes – piano
- Gary Mallaber – drums
- John Platania – guitar
- Jack Schroer – alto saxophone
- Collin Tilton – tenor saxophone

== Certifications ==
Certifications for "And It Stoned Me"
Region	Certification	Certified units/sales
New Zealand (RMNZ)	Platinum	30,000^{‡}
^{‡} Sales+streaming figures based on certification alone.
