= Brand New Day (Van Morrison song) =

Song by Van Morrison

from the album Moondance
- Released: February 1970
- Genre: R & B/Country rock
- Length: 5:09
- Label: Warner Bros. Records
- Songwriter: Van Morrison
- Producers: Van Morrison and Lewis Merenstein

Moondance track listing
- 10 tracks Side one: 1. "And It Stoned Me"; 2. "Moondance"; 3. "Crazy Love"; 4. "Caravan"; 5. "Into the Mystic"; Side two: 6. "Come Running"; 7. "These Dreams of You"; 8. "Brand New Day"; 9. "Everyone"; 10. "Glad Tidings"

"Brand New Day" is a song written by Northern Irish singer-songwriter Van Morrison and featured on his 1970 album Moondance.

The song is described on the album as one of Morrison's "classic compositions", along with "Moondance", "And it Stoned Me", "Caravan" and "Into the Mystic". It features improvisation on Jack Schroer's alto saxophone and a backing vocal trio.

== Recording ==
Morrison first recorded the song in the summer of 1969 at the Warner Publishing Studio, New York with producer Lewis Merenstein. The track was rerecorded in the sessions from September to November of the same year at the A&R Recording Studios, 46th Street, New York to be released on Moondance.

== Composition ==
"Brand New Day" is composed in the key of G major with the chord progression of G-F♯m-Em-C-D-G-D in the verses and G-D-G-C in the chorus. The song is written in a slow 4/4 time.

Morrison described his inspiration for the song:

"Brand New Day" expressed a lot of hope. I was in Boston and having a hard job getting myself up spiritually...Then one day this song came on the FM station and it had this particular feeling and this particular groove and it was totally fresh. It seemed to me like things were making sense....I didn't know who the hell the artist was. It turned out to be The Band. I looked up at the sky and the sun started to shine and all of a sudden the song just came through my head. I started to write it down, right from "When all the dark clouds roll away"....The song (on FM radio) was either "The Weight" or "I Shall Be Released".

According to Morrison biographer Erik Hage and music critic Johnny Rogan, the "I Shall Be Released" was the inspiration for the spiritual and redemptive themes of "Brand New Day." Hage described the song as having a "spacious, warm gospel flow" that he contrasts with "I Shall Be Released" stating that "Brand New Day" achieves its spirituality by using a "southern gospel framework" and female backup singers (including Whitney Houston's mother Cissy Houston), while "I Shall Be Released achieves its effect "via an impressive pseudobiblical antiquity."

== Reception ==
Several commentators have singled out "Brand New Day" for praise as a great song on side two of the Moondance LP while acknowledging the classic status of the whole of side one. For example, Mojo stated that "The original album's first side was as strong as any in rock's 15 year history," and then went on to call "Brand New Day "the other outstanding song on Moondance." Rolling Stone Magazine contributor Rob Sheffield stated that side one was so great that no one ever played side two, but "'Brand New Day' is pretty good, however." Hage describes "Brand New Day" as "deep, slow-burning soul" with a "slow, languorous intensity." Rogan called it a song "of unrestrained joy."

== Personnel ==
- Van Morrison – vocals, guitar
- Jeff Labes – piano
- Gary Mallaber – drums
- John Klingberg – bass guitar
- John Platania – guitar
- Jack Schroer – alto saxophone
- Jackie Verdell – background vocals
- Judy Clay – background vocals
- Cissy Houston (Emily Houston) – background vocals

== Covers ==
"Brand New Day" has been covered by Dorothy Morrison, Esther Phillips, Frankie Laine and Miriam Makeba.
