= Glass harp (disambiguation) =

Glass harp may refer to:

- Glass harp, a musical instrument
- Glass Harp (band), a progressive rock band
- Glass Harp (album), an album by a band of the same name
