= Into the Mystic =

1970 song by Van Morrison

Song by Van Morrison

from the album Moondance
- Released: February 1970
- Recorded: September–November 1969
- Studio: A&R Recording Studios, New York City
- Genre: Blues; folk; rock; blue-eyed soul
- Length: 3:25
- Label: Warner Bros.
- Songwriter: Van Morrison
- Producers: Van Morrison and Lewis Merenstein

Moondance track listing
- 10 tracks Side one: 1. "And It Stoned Me"; 2. "Moondance"; 3. "Crazy Love"; 4. "Caravan"; 5. "Into the Mystic"; Side two: 6. "Come Running"; 7. "These Dreams of You"; 8. "Brand New Day"; 9. "Everyone"; 10. "Glad Tidings"

"Into the Mystic" is a song written by Northern Irish singer-songwriter Van Morrison and featured on his 1970 album Moondance. It was also included on Morrison's 1974 live album, It's Too Late to Stop Now.

== Recording and composition ==
"Into the Mystic" was recorded during the Moondance sessions at A&R Recording Studios in New York City in September to November 1969. Elliott Scheiner was the engineer.

The lyrics are about a spirituality, a quest, typical of Morrison's work. "Bass thrums like a boat in motion, and the song comes back to water as a means of magical transformation." "At the very end Van sings: too late to stop now, suggesting that the song also describes an act of love." (This phrase would become a key point of many live concerts.) Compared to "Yesterday" by The Beatles, it has been described as "another song where the music and the words seem to have been born together, at the same time, to make one perfectly formed, complete artistic element."

Morrison remarked on the song and how its use of homophones lent it alternate meanings:

"'Into the Mystic' is another one like 'Madame Joy' and 'Brown Eyed Girl'. Originally I wrote it as 'Into the Misty'. But later I thought that it had something of an ethereal feeling to it so I called it 'Into the Mystic'. That song is kind of funny because when it came time to send the lyrics in WB Music, I couldn't figure out what to send them. Because really the song has two sets of lyrics. For example, there's 'I was born before the wind' and 'I was borne before the wind', and also 'Also younger than the sun, Ere the bonny boat was one' and 'All so younger than the son, Ere the bonny boat was won' ... I guess the song is just about being part of the universe."

Music critic Johnny Rogan explained that because of these homophones, "although [the song's] province sounded like the astral plane, it also conjured images of the shipyards of East Belfast with Morrison's tenor sax imitating the sound of a fog horn."

== Reception ==
A Rolling Stone review by Greil Marcus and Lester Bangs described the song's importance on the album as: "'Into the Mystic' is the heart of Moondance; the music unfolds with a classic sense of timing, guitar strums fading into watery notes on a piano, the bass counting off the pace. The lines of the song and Morrison's delivery of them are gorgeous: 'I want to rock your gypsy soul/Just like in the days of old/And magnificently we will fold/Into the mystic.' The Moondance Allmusic review described it as "a song of such elemental beauty and grace as to stand as arguably the quintessential Morrison moment." Rogan described it as "one of [Morrison's] finest compositions of the period." Ultimate Classic Rock rated "Into the Mystic" as Morrison's greatest song, stating that its "grace and style" turned it into "an instant classic."

== Acclaim ==
"Into the Mystic" is No. 474 on the list of Rolling Stone's 2010 feature, The 500 Greatest Songs of All Time, No. 480 in the 2004 feature, and No. 462 in the 2021 feature. It was listed as No. 42 on The 885 Essential XPN Songs compiled in 2008 by WXPN from listener's votes.

According to a BBC survey, because of this song's cooling, soothing vibe, this is one of the most popular songs for surgeons to listen to while performing operations. Singer-songwriter Elvis Costello has identified this song as one of his favourite songs on Moondance, one of his 500 essential albums.

"Into the Mystic" is also Morrison's second most streamed song on Spotify, with "Brown Eyed Girl" being first and "Moondance" third. On the Billboard Rock Digital Song Sales, it peaked at #5 and in 2022 "Into the Mystic" reached #1 on the Ireland radio airplay chart.

== Alternate mix ==
On the original 1970 pressings of the Moondance LP, "Into the Mystic" is presented in a mix done on 10 December 1969, featuring a prominent tambourine throughout the song. Later LP pressings, and all CD reissues of the album prior to 2008, contain an alternate mix of the song done on 5 January 1970, lacking the tambourine and with a more muted foghorn sound. The original tambourine mix of the song made its CD debut in a 2008 Japanese Moondance remaster, and was also restored for a vinyl reissue of the album on Rhino Records later that year. The 2013 remaster of the Moondance album also features the tambourine mix.

== Other releases ==
A live version was included on the 1974 double live album It's Too Late to Stop Now, with the same live version included on the 2007 compilation album, Van Morrison at the Movies - Soundtrack Hits. An instrumental version of the song is played in a medley with "Inarticulate Speech of the Heart" on the 1984 live album Live at the Grand Opera House Belfast. The original version is one of the songs included in the 2007 compilation album, Still on Top - The Greatest Hits (UK edition only).

== Personnel ==
- Van Morrison – vocals, guitar, tambourine
- John Klingberg – bass guitar
- Jeff Labes – piano
- Gary Mallaber – drums
- John Platania – guitar
- Jack Schroer – alto saxophone
- Collin Tilton – tenor saxophone

== Certifications ==
Certifications for "Into the Mystic"
Region	Certification	Certified units/sales
New Zealand (RMNZ)	3× Platinum	90,000^{‡}
^{‡} Sales+streaming figures based on certification alone.

== Covers ==
"Into the Mystic"

Single by Johnny Rivers

from the album Slim Slo Slider
- B-side: "Jesus is a Soul Man"
- Released: April 1970
- Recorded: 1970
- Genre: Folk rock
- Length: 3:09
- Label: Imperial
- Songwriter: Van Morrison
- Producer: Lou Adler

Johnny Rivers singles chronology
"One Woman" (1969)	"Into the Mystic" (1970)	"Fire and Rain" (1970)

"Into the Mystic" has been a popularly performed cover song over the years and has been recorded by many well-known musicians. Some of the artists performing it are Paul Carrack, Joe Cocker, Glen Hansard & Markéta Irglová (The Swell Season) on the Once (Collector's Edition of Original Soundtrack), The Dead, Jackson Hawke, Colin James, Ben E. King, Michael McDonald, The Allman Brothers Band, Zac Brown Band, Marc Cohn, Paco Estrada, The Wallflowers, Stoney Larue, and Jason Isbell. The Mike McClure Band covers the song on their 2005 album, Camelot Falling. Johnny Rivers covered the song on his album Slim Slo Slider, Paul Cotton of the country rock band Poco covered the song on his solo album When The Coast Is Clear, and Esther Phillips from her 1977 album You've Come a Long Way, Baby. Bob Dylan covered the song in Alicante, Spain on June 15, 2023 in the midst of his "Rough and Rowdy Ways": World Wide Tour / 2021-2024.

== Sources ==
- Heylin, Clinton (2003). Can You Feel the Silence? Van Morrison: A New Biography, Chicago Review Press ISBN 1-55652-542-7
- Hinton, Brian (1997). Celtic Crossroads: The Art of Van Morrison, Sanctuary, ISBN 1-86074-169-X
