= It's Too Late to Stop Now =

1974 double live album by Van Morrison

Live album by Van Morrison
- Released: 1 February 1974
- Recorded: 24 May – 24 July 1973
- Venues: The Troubadour in Los Angeles, the Santa Monica Civic Auditorium in Santa Monica, and the Rainbow in London
- Genres: Rock, soul, jazz
- Length: 92:33
- Label: Warner Bros.
- Producers: Van Morrison, Ted Templeman

Van Morrison chronology
Hard Nose the Highway (1973)	It's Too Late to Stop Now (1974)	Veedon Fleece (1974)

Singles from It's Too Late to Stop Now
- 1. "Ain't Nothin' You Can Do" b/w "Wild Children" Released: 3 April 1974; 2. "Gloria" b/w "Warm Love" Released: 1974

It's Too Late to Stop Now is a 1974 live double album by Northern Irish singer-songwriter Van Morrison. It features performances that were recorded in concerts at the Troubadour in Los Angeles, California, the Santa Monica Civic Auditorium, and the Rainbow in London, during Morrison's three-month tour with his eleven-piece band, the Caledonia Soul Orchestra, from May to July 1973. Frequently named as one of the best live albums ever, It's Too Late to Stop Now was recorded during what has often been said to be the singer's greatest phase as a live performer.

Volumes II, III, and IV of the album were released as a box-set in 2016, also including a DVD.

== Tour and performances ==
Noted for being a mercurial and temperamental live performer, during this short period of time in 1973, Morrison went on one of his most diligent tours in years. With his eleven-piece band, The Caledonia Soul Orchestra, which included a horn and string section, he has often been said to have been at his live performing peak. The tour was a dynamic musical journey for both Van Morrison and the band. "He wasn't looking to repeat himself. He wanted to create a new show every night." said Jef Labes. Van was changing his phrasing with each performance and would be directing the band with hand gestures onstage. "We could take the songs anywhere Van wanted to take them" said guitarist Platania "Every performance of each song was different". The alternate recordings of songs on the various volumes from the 2016 box-set prove his point.

Morrison said about touring during this period:

"I am getting more into performing. It's incredible. When I played Carnegie Hall in the fall something just happened. All of a sudden I felt like 'you're back into performing' and it just happened like that...A lot of times in the past I've done gigs and it was rough to get through them. But now the combination seems to be right and it's been clicking a lot."

It's like watching a tiger. The tiger isn't thinking about where he's going to put his paws or how he's going to kill... and [it's the] same thing with Van. He's just so there that you're completely drawn to it.

— Jim Rothernel

Evidence of his newly invigorated joy in performing was on display during the ending of the over-ten-minute-long dynamic performance of "Cyprus Avenue". When an audience member shouts out, "Turn it on!", Morrison good-naturedly replies, "It's turned on already." At the very end he finished the concert with a final heartfelt, "It's too late to stop now!" giving the album its title (this line first appeared on the song "Into the Mystic").

The concert performances were described by Erik Hage as "sequences of a young soul lion whipping the crowd into a frenzy and then stopping on a dime—teasing out anticipation, rushing, receding, and coaxing every drop out of his band."

Guitarist John Platania says "He had a funeral for a lot of his old songs on stage. With Caledonia, he really got off on performing. There was definitely joy getting onstage at that point. That was a wonderful time for everybody. It was really like a family. Ordinarily, with rock 'n' rollers, jazzers and classical musicians in the band, you'd think it was a three-headed serpent but everybody got along famously."

The performances on the live album were from tapes made at the beginning of the tour in Los Angeles and also in Santa Monica and London. Marco Bario, who attended the opening night concert at The Troubadour, said in Playgirl: "he was exceptional. The mood was right, the audience was receptive, and the music left no comparisons to be made. It was the finest opening night performance by a consummate musician that I have ever witnessed."

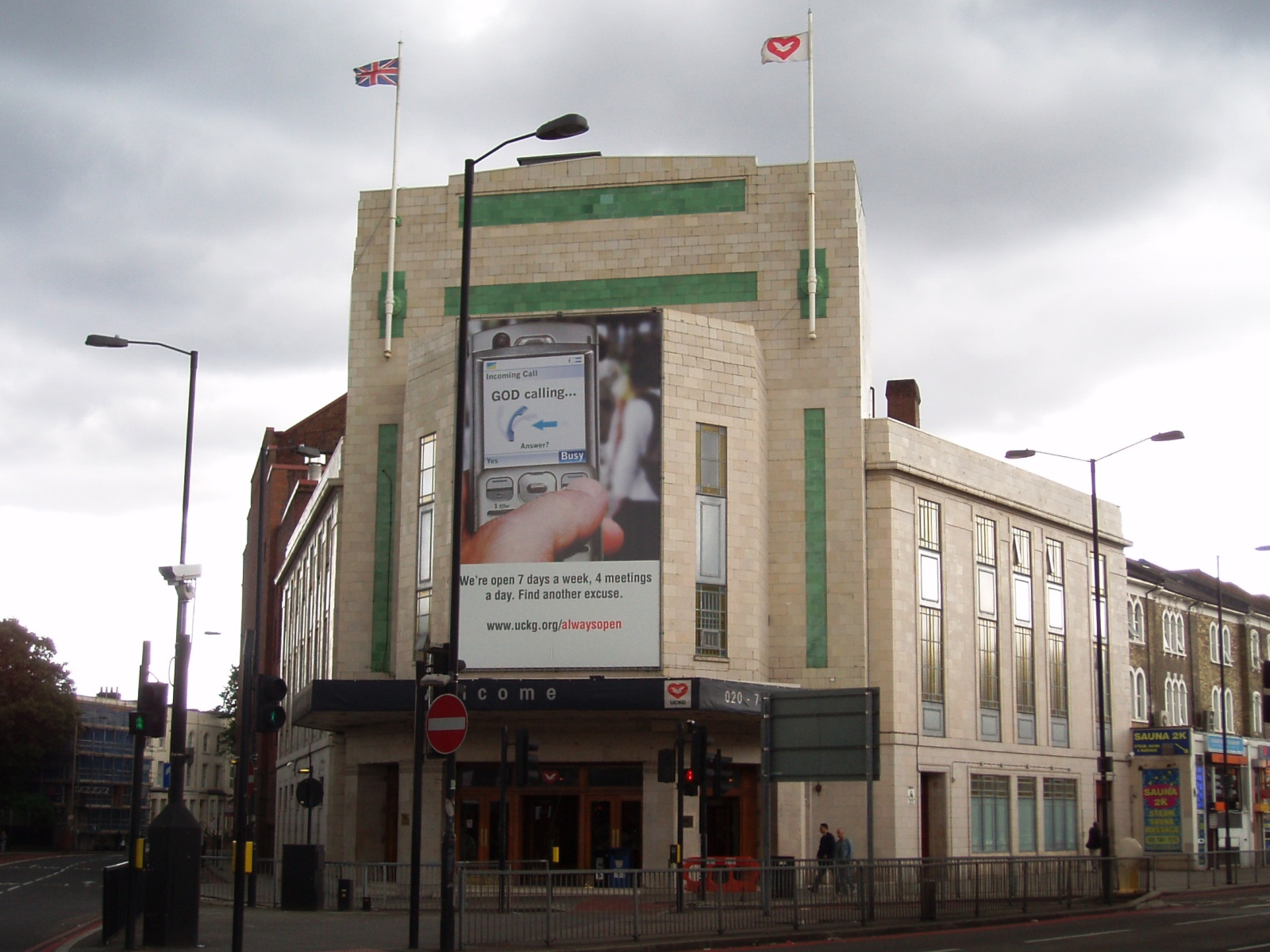
The Rainbow Theatre in London

The London concerts were the first time he had appeared in that city since performing with Them, six years earlier. The two concerts at the Rainbow Theatre in London were referred to as "the rock event of the year" by critics according to Ritchie Yorke in his biography. The 24 July 1973 London Rainbow concert was the first BBC simulcast broadcast simultaneously on BBC 2 television and Radio 2 stereo so that viewers with strategically sited loudspeakers could enjoy "stereo TV". The broadcast took place on 27 May 1974.

== Music ==
The album mixes songs that inspired Morrison's own musical development, together with some of his own compositions, and allied to a backing band and orchestra (The Caledonia Soul Orchestra), The album performances were reviewed by Myles Palmer of the Times as demolishing "all barriers between the soul, blues, jazz and rock genres". The songs chosen went back to his days with Them with versions of "Gloria" and "Here Comes the Night". His first solo hit "Brown Eyed Girl" was performed but not included on the album until the reissue in 2008. M. Mark called the album "an intelligent selection of songs that draws on six of Morrison's records and five of the musicians he learned from." These musicians were Bobby Bland ("Ain't Nothing You Can Do"), Ray Charles ("I Believe to My Soul"), Sam Cooke ("Bring It On Home to Me"), two songs by Sonny Boy Williamson II ("Help Me" and "Take Your Hands Out of My Pocket") and a cover of a Willie Dixon song, "I Just Want to Make Love to You", which was popularized by Muddy Waters.

Additional musical influences are revealed in the 2016 box set release; Hank Williams ("Hey, Good Lookin'") and Buddy Johnson ("Since I Fell for You"). The box also includes two new songs at the time of the tour and not released on any other album: "No Way", written by pianist Jef Labes; and "I Paid the Price", which was about his marriage with Janet Planet that was breaking up.

== Production ==
It's Too Late to Stop Now is thought to be one of the first live rock albums to have string players. The album was recorded (as noted in the album's liner notes) at two California performances at The Troubadour in Los Angeles (23–27 May 1973) and the Santa Monica Civic Auditorium (29 June 1973), and a London show at The Rainbow in (23–24 July 1973).

Unlike most live rock albums, there was no studio overdubbing allowed by Morrison. "People cut live albums and they take it to the studio and play with it for about a year, but this one's just as it happened", said Morrison. Morrison strictly adhered to his concept of authenticity in presenting the live performance. "It's common practice to go back and fix things, but not with Van", bass player David Hayes said, "I think that's what makes it one of the best ever." Morrison's musical perfectionism prevented him from including the popular song "Moondance" in the original album due to one wrong guitar note. In 2016, a live recording of the song was released as part of Volume II.

== Release and reception ==
Professional ratings
Review scores
Source	Rating
AllMusic	4.5/5 stars
American Songwriter	5/5 stars
Christgau's Record Guide	A
Creem	A−
Encyclopedia of Popular Music	4/5 stars
MusicHound Rock	4/5
Q	5/5 stars
Record Collector	5/5 stars
The Rolling Stone Album Guide	5/5 stars
Tom Hull	A

According to Elmore Magazine's Mike Jurkovic, when It's Too Late to Stop Now was first released in 1974, "everyone—and I do mean everyone—tripped over themselves to hail the two-LP set as one of the greatest live renderings of the rock era." Reviewing the album in Creem, Robert Christgau hailed it as Morrison's best since Moondance (1970) while writing, "Songs that wore poorly or were just lame in the first place have more force and tightness here than in their studio versions". Ken Emerson was somewhat less impressed in Rolling Stone: "On It's Too Late Morrison's voice is in fine form, but much else is not...The other musicians, most of whom have played with Morrison many times before, never detract, but Morrison could be better served....But the power of Morrison's vocals overcomes these drawbacks." At the end of 1974, It's Too Late to Stop Now was voted the 20th best album of the year in the Pazz & Jop, an annual poll of American critics, published by The Village Voice. Ellen Willis, Greil Marcus, and Christgau ranked it 2nd, 6th, and 18th, respectively, in their ballots for the poll.

Three months after the concerts for the Too Late to Stop Now tour, Morrison had disbanded The Caledonia Soul Orchestra and went on a vacation tour of Ireland for three weeks that resulted in the album Veedon Fleece.

In a retrospective review, Jason Ankenny from AllMusic regarded the album as "an engaging, warm portrait of the man at the peak of his powers", while Morrison biographer John Collis called it "one of the most impressive of all attempts to squeeze the stage excitement of a rock performer on to vinyl." Fellow biographer Johnny Rogan said that "Morrison was in the midst of what was arguably his greatest phase as a performer." Chris Jones of the BBC wrote: "In a live setting all the hyperbole about Morrison's blend of genres into one Celtic, mystic vision makes perfect sense. This is soul music in a very real sense." Hal Horowitz with American Songwriter, on reviewing the 2008 remasters of some of Morrison's albums, said, "The classic is 1974’s double live It’s Too Late…, rightfully on anyone’s shortlist of finest concert albums. Van typically blows hot and cold on stage, but when he ignites on the oldies and choice blues covers here, few can touch him for pure blue-eyed soul passion." It's Too Late to Stop Now has been on lists of greatest live albums of all time.

A remastered version of the album was released on 29 January 2008 containing a live take of "Brown Eyed Girl" not included on the original release. This version was then not included on the 2016 reissue and is not currently available; a recording of the song from a different night was included on Volume II of the 2016 issues.

On 10 June 2016, a box set containing the three complete Los Angeles (23 May 1973), Santa Monica (29 May 1973), and London (23/24 July 1973) shows, along with a DVD of the BBC footage from the 24 July show, was released as ..It's Too Late to Stop Now Vol. II, III, IV & DVD.

== Track listing ==
=== Original 1974 double LP ===
All tracks written by Van Morrison, except where noted. The compact disc version places sides one and two on disc one, with sides three and four, and the bonus track at the end of disc two.

Side one
No.	Title	Writer(s)	Original release	Length
1.	"Ain't Nothin' You Can Do"	Joseph Scott	Bobby "Blue" Bland cover (1964)	3:44
2.	"Warm Love"		Hard Nose the Highway (1973)	3:04
3.	"Into the Mystic"		Moondance (1970)	4:33
4.	"These Dreams of You"		Moondance (1970)	3:37
5.	"I Believe to My Soul"	Ray Charles	Ray Charles cover (1961)	4:09
Total length:				19:07

Side two
No.	Title	Writer(s)	Original release	Length
1.	"I've Been Working"		His Band and the Street Choir (1970)	3:56
2.	"Help Me"	Sonny Boy Williamson II, Ralph Bass, Willie Dixon	Sonny Boy Williamson II cover (1963)	3:25
3.	"Wild Children"		Hard Nose the Highway (1973)	5:04
4.	"Domino"		His Band and the Street Choir (1970)	4:48
5.	"I Just Want to Make Love to You"	Willie Dixon	Muddy Waters cover (1954)	5:16
Total length:				22:29

Side three
No.	Title	Writer(s)	Original release	Length
1.	"Bring It On Home to Me"	Sam Cooke	Sam Cooke cover (1962)	4:42
2.	"Saint Dominic's Preview"		Saint Dominic's Preview (1972)	6:18
3.	"Take Your Hand Out of My Pocket"	Sonny Boy Williamson II	Sonny Boy Williamson II cover (1969)	4:04
4.	"Listen to the Lion"		Saint Dominic's Preview (1972)	8:43
Total length:				23:47

Side four
No.	Title	Writer(s)	Original release	Length
1.	"Here Comes the Night"	Bert Berns	Them single (1965)	3:14
2.	"Gloria"		The Angry Young Them (1965)	4:16
3.	"Caravan"		Moondance (1970)	9:20
4.	"Cyprus Avenue"		Astral Weeks (1968)	10:20
Total length:				27:10

2008 bonus track
No.	Title	Original release	Length
9.	"Brown Eyed Girl"	Blowin' Your Mind! (1967)	3:24

== Personnel ==
- Van Morrison – vocal
- Nathan Rubin – first violin
- Tom Halpin or Tim Kovatch – violin
- Nancy Ellis – viola
- Teresa Adams – cello
- Bill Atwood – trumpet, backing vocals
- Jack Schroer – alto, tenor and baritone saxophones, tambourine, backing vocals
- Jef Labes – piano, organ
- John Platania – guitar, backing vocals
- David Hayes – bass guitar, backing vocals
- Dahaud Shaar (David Shaw) – drums, backing vocals

=== Production personnel ===
- Van Morrison, Ted Templeman – producers
- Van Morrison, Jef Labes (strings), Jack Schroer (horns) – arrangements
- Donn Landee, Myles Wiener, Biff Dawes, Jack Crymes, Gabby Garcia, Chris Chigaridas, Bill Broms, Bob Harper – engineers

== Recording locations ==
- The Troubadour, Los Angeles, California
- Santa Monica Civic Auditorium, Santa Monica, California
- Rainbow Theatre, London, England

== Charts ==
=== Weekly charts ===
Chart (1974–2016)	Peak position
Australia (Kent Music Report)	23
Austrian Albums (Ö3 Austria)	29
Belgian Albums (Ultratop Flanders)	19
Belgian Albums (Ultratop Wallonia)	143
Dutch Albums (Album Top 100)	35
German Albums (Offizielle Top 100)	28
Irish Albums (IRMA)	79
Italian Albums (FIMI)	71
Spanish Albums (Promusicae)	77
US Billboard 200	53

..It's Too Late To Stop Now Volumes II, III, IV & DVD
Chart (2016)	Peak position
Italian Albums (FIMI)	49
Scottish Albums (Official Charts)	27
Swedish Albums (Sverigetopplistan)	19
Swiss Albums (Schweizer Hitparade)	59
UK Albums (Official Charts)	47
US Billboard 200	118
US Top Rock Albums (Billboard)	15

=== Year-end charts ===
Chart (2016)	Position
Belgian Albums (Ultratop Flanders)	171
