= It Makes Me Glad =

Studio album by Glass Harp
- Released: 1972
- Recorded: Electric Lady Studios
- Genre: Rock, progressive rock
- Length: 38:00
- Label: Decca; Music Mill (2005 CD Re-Issue)
- Producer: Lewis Merenstein, Glass Harp

It Makes Me Glad is an album released by Glass Harp in 1972. It would be the last studio album released by the band until Hourglass in 2003.

In 2005, the album was re-issued by the Music Mill label. The reissue was digitally remastered, and contains updated/extended liner notes and a bonus track.

== Track listing ==
1. "See Saw" (Daniel Pecchio) – 2:12
2. "Sailing on a River" (John Sferra) – 3:38
3. "La De Da" (Daniel Pecchio) – 5:45
4. "Colt" (John Sferra) – 3:23
5. "Sea and You" (John Sferra) – 4:15
6. "David and Goliath" (Phil Keaggy) – 2:50
7. "I'm Going Home" (Phil Keaggy) – 2:50
8. "Do Lord" (Phil Keaggy, John Sferra, Daniel Pecchio) – 4:22
9. "Song In the Air" (Phil Keaggy) – 2:35
10. "Let's Live Together" (Phil Keaggy, John Sferra, Daniel Pecchio) – 3:50
11. "Little Doggie (Phil Keaggy, Daniel Pecchio) - (Bonus Track, 2005 Re-Issue)*
- The songs David and Goliath, I'm Going Home and Do Lord all merge into one another, creating one extended track. The three songs have become known to fans as The Trilogy.

== Personnel ==
- Phil Keaggy — vocals, electric and acoustic guitars
- Dan Pecchio — vocals, bass, flute, piano
- John Sferra — vocals, drums, acoustic guitar
