= I've Been Working =

Song by Van Morrison

from the album His Band and the Street Choir
- Released: November 15, 1970
- Recorded: June–September 1970
- Genre: Funk rock; R&B
- Length: 3:25
- Label: Warner Bros.
- Songwriter: Van Morrison
- Producer: Van Morrison

"I've Been Working" is a song written by Northern Irish singer-songwriter Van Morrison appearing on the album His Band and the Street Choir, released in 1970. The song was first an outtake from Morrison's well received album Astral Weeks of 1968. Other versions of "I've Been Working" were recorded for Morrison's next album Moondance, of which, three were released on the 2013 deluxe edition.

== Releases and performances ==
- A live performance appeared on Morrison's 1974 live album, It's Too Late to Stop Now.
- The song appears on the 1981 video Van Morrison in Ireland recorded in 1979.
- "I've Been Working" also appears on the 1994 live album A Night in San Francisco.
- Morrison performed the song in April 1973 for the television program Don Kirshner's Rock Concert.

== Personnel on original release ==
- Van Morrison – guitar, vocal
- Keith Johnson – trumpet, organ
- John Klingberg – bass guitar
- John Platania – guitar
- Jack Schroer – alto and baritone saxophones
- Dahaud Shaar (David Shaw) – drums

== Cover versions ==
- Bob Seger covered this song on his album Back in '72, and later performed it on his successful live album Live Bullet in 1976.
- Bo Diddley's 1974 album, Big Bad Bo had a cover by Diddley of "I've Been Working".
- "Workin'" covered by Professor Louie & The Crowmatix 2023 release Rockin' Legacy Vol 1 EP original guitarist John Platania (original guitarist) playing guitar and singing lead. ref woodstockrecords.com
- "I've Been Working" was the final track on the 1974 album More Orphan Than Not, by Orphan.
- The song was also covered by Guitar Shorty in 2004, on his album Watch Your Back.
- Gov't Mule often works the song into its signature song "Mule" during live performances.
