= Glass Harp (album) =

Studio album by Glass Harp
- Released: 1970
- Studio: Electric Lady Studios, New York City
- Genre: Rock
- Length: 49:05
- Label: Decca
- Producer: Lewis Merenstein

Glass Harp chronology
Glass Harp (1970)	Synergy (1971)

Professional ratings
Review scores
Source	Rating
Allmusic	4.5/5 stars

Glass Harp is the debut album by American rock band Glass Harp. It was released in 1970 on Decca Records. The album was produced by Lewis Merenstein and engineered by Ron Johnsen at Electric Lady Studios.

== Track listing ==
1. "Can You See Me" (Daniel Pecchio, Phil Keaggy) – 6:25
2. "Children's Fantasy" (Phil Keaggy) – 4:10
3. "Changes (In the Heart of My Own True Love)" (John Sferra) – 6:00
4. "Village Queen" (Daniel Pecchio) – 4:00
5. "Black Horse" (John Sferra) – 2:50
6. "Southbound" (John Sferra, Phil Keaggy) – 3:50
7. "Whatever Life Demands" (Daniel Pecchio, Phil Keaggy) – 6:30
8. "Look in the Sky" (Daniel Pecchio, John Sferra, Phil Keaggy) – 8:10
9. "Garden" (Daniel Pecchio, John Sferra, Phil Keaggy) – 4:21
10. "On Our Own" (John Sferra, Phil Keaggy) – 2:30

== Personnel ==
Glass Harp

- Phil Keaggy – guitars, vocals
- John Sferra – drums, vocals, guitars
- Daniel Pecchio – bass, vocals, flute

with:

- John Cale – electric viola, organ
- Larry Fallon – string arrangements

Technical

- Ron Johnsen – engineer
- Ernie Cefalu – album design
- Bill Levy – cover photography
