= Bill Atwood (musician) =

American trumpet and flugelhorn player

- Genres: Rock and roll, Pop, R&B
- Occupation: Musician
- Instruments: Trumpet, flugelhorn

Bill Atwood is an American trumpet and flugelhorn player, and is best known for his work with Van Morrison and his band The Caledonia Soul Orchestra.

Atwood has worked with bands and musicians such as The Sir Douglas Quintet, It's a Beautiful Day, Boz Scaggs (Moments), Cold Blood, Buddy Miles, Grateful Dead (Wake of the Flood, Grateful Dead from the Mars Hotel), Van Morrison and The Caledonia Soul Orchestra (Hard Nose the Highway, It's Too Late to Stop Now) and Sons of the San Joaquin (Horses, Cattle and Coyotes).
