= Kendel Carson =

Canadian singer and fiddler (born 1985)

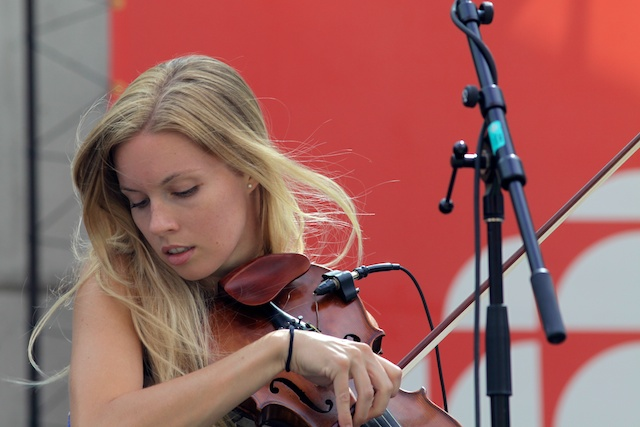
- Kendel Carson plays on the CBC Plaza in Vancouver in 2010

Background information
- Born: Kendel Carson; 3 December 1984 (age 41)
- Origin: Calgary, Alberta, Canada
- Genre: Rock|Country|Celtic|Folk
- Occupations: Musician, Singer-songwriter, Producer, Multi-Instrumentalist
- Instruments: Fiddle/Violin, Guitar, Vocals
- Years active: c. 1998–present
- Label: Train Wreck
- Website: kendelcarson.com

Kendel Carson (born c. 1984) is a Canadian fiddler, singer, songwriter, producer and multi-instrumentalist. She is known for her long associations with The Paperboys, Spirit of the West, Chip Taylor, Matt Mays and more. She has released multiple solo albums as well as having appeared on recordings for many other artists. Since 2012, Carson has toured and recorded regularly with Alan Doyle (Great Big Sea) as part of his "Beautiful Beautiful Band". In addition to her work with Doyle, in 2025 she began touring with Shania Twain.

== Life and career ==
She was born in Calgary, Alberta, and at the age of seven she moved with her family to Victoria, British Columbia. She started to play the violin at age three. She studied classical music, and at age twelve she and her brother Tyler Carson were regular soloists for a children's concert series with the Victoria Symphony. In 2003, she played with the National Youth Orchestra of Canada.

Along with her interest in classical music, she and her brother enjoyed other genres of music and they performed as buskers on the streets of Victoria. She once played an impromptu fiddle accompaniment for Spirit of the West. Following her stint with the Youth Orchestra, she joined the Celtic rock group The Paperboys in Vancouver on the strength of her experience with Spirit of the West. She also performed with Spirit of the West at several shows in 2012 when regular member Geoffrey Kelly was ill.

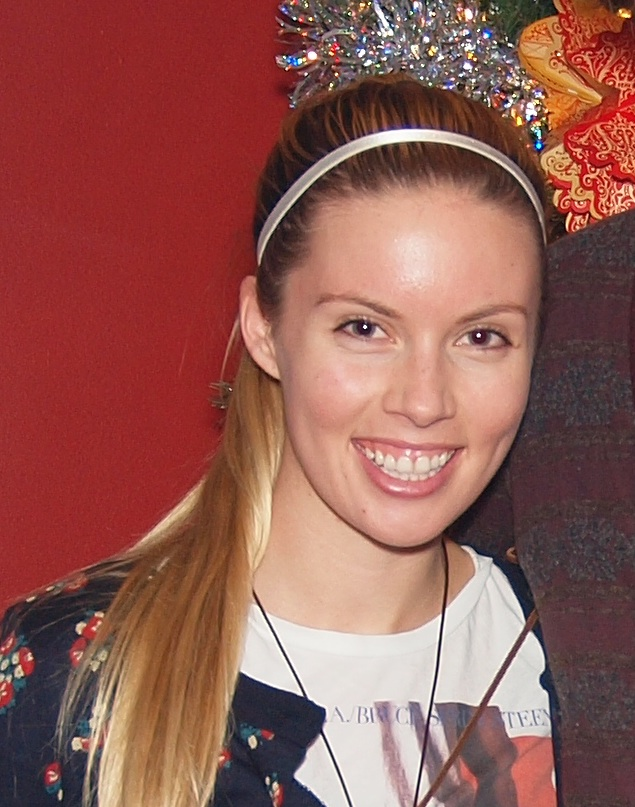
Carson in November 2010

Later, at an outdoor concert with The Paperboys, she met Chip Taylor, the noted songwriter famous for such songs as "Angel of the Morning", and he became her mentor, musical partner, and producer. With Taylor, she has developed her vocal talents along with her fiddling. She records for Taylor's Train Wreck Records, and they have performed together in North America and in Europe.

Her first album with Taylor, Rearview Mirror Tears was named by Q Magazine as one of the five best roots albums of 2007. XM Radio declared it one of the top ten country albums of the year.

She also records and performs with Stephanie Cadman and Miranda Mulholland in a country music trio called Belle Starr. For the past several years she has also performed with Barney Bentall and the Grand Cariboo Opry. In 2012, she became a member of Alan Doyle's band during the tour in support of his solo album, Boy on Bridge (2012). While Carson does not appear on the album itself, she became a full time member of his band, Alan Doyle & The Beautiful Beautiful Band and appears on every Doyle recording since.

In 2025, she appeared as a guest musician on The Great Lakes Suite, an album by Rheostatics.

She lists Janis Joplin, Lucinda Williams, The Band, and Emmylou Harris among her many influences.

== Discography ==
=== Solo ===
- Rearview Mirror Tears (debut, 2006)
- Alright Dynamite (2009)
- The Lost Tapes of Suzanna Hamilton (2018)
- The Calgary Sessions (2018)

=== with Belle Starr ===
- The Burning of Atlanta (EP, 2012)
- Belle Starr (2013)

=== with Outlaw Social ===
- A Seven Song E.P. (2006)
- Dry Bones (2007)

=== with Alan Doyle ===
- So Let's Go (2015)
- A Week at the Warehouse (2017)
- Rough Side Out (2020)
- Welcome Home (2024)
- Already Dancing (2026)
