= The Caledonia Soul Orchestra =

Band created by Van Morrison

The Caledonia Soul Orchestra was the band created by Northern Irish singer-songwriter Van Morrison in 1973. The band was named after an eighteen-minute instrumental outtake from the His Band and the Street Choir album sessions.

== Tour in 1973 ==
In 1973 Van Morrison and the Caledonia Soul Orchestra went on a three-month tour of the United States and Europe, the result of which was the live double album It's Too Late to Stop Now. The title is taken from the last line in the lyrics of one of Morrison's songs, "Into the Mystic", from the 1970 Moondance album. In live performances with the Caledonia Soul Orchestra, he would close the concert with a lengthened version of the Astral Weeks song "Cyprus Avenue" and then shout out "It's too late to stop now!" as he exited the stage.

The tour began with warm up shows at the Lions Share in Marin County, California, and an appearance on Don Kirshner's Rock Concert in April 1973 culminating with two nights at London's Rainbow Theatre in July 1973 (voted by Q Magazine readers as one of the top 100 live performances of all time). The tour was originated to promote the 1973 album, Hard Nose the Highway. By tour's end it featured forty songs with twelve of them covers such as Sam Cooke's "Bring it on Home to Me" and Sonny Boy Williamson's "Help Me". Morrison was going through a divorce at the time and the selection of material and the impassioned performances were evidence of his inner turmoil, combined with a newfound joy of performing. "I would say that that tour represented the height of his confidence as a performer," band member John Platania remarked.

Morrison disbanded the group, saving only a few musicians for his follow up album, Veedon Fleece, in 1974. A few of the original Caledonia Soul Orchestra musicians would remain in Morrison's band over the years.

== Critical response ==
John Collis in his book, Inarticulate Speech on the Heart, comments that "with the magnificent Caledonia Soul Orchestra on song he [Morrison] came of age as a magnetic stage performer, culminating in the release of the double set It's Too Late to Stop Now one of the most impressive of all attempts to squeeze the stage excitement of a rock performer on to vinyl."

== The Caledonia Soul Orchestra lineup ==
- Van Morrison: vocals, acoustic guitar, alto saxophone
- John Platania: guitar, backing vocals
- Jeff Labes: organ, piano (8 May 1973 onwards)
- James Trumbo: piano (15 February 1973 to 19 April 1973)
- David Hayes: bass, backing vocals
- Jack Schroer: alto, tenor, baritone and soprano saxophones, tambourine, backing vocals
- Dahaud Shaar: drums, backing vocals
- Bill Atwood: trumpet, flugelhorn, backing vocals
- Nathan Rubin: first violin
- Terry Adams: cello
- Nancy Ellis: viola
- Tom Halpin: violin (replaced by Tim Kovatch, uncertain date)
- Tim Kovatch: violin
