= Glass Harp (band) =

American rock band

- Genres: Rock, progressive rock, jam band, psychedelic rock
- Years active: 1970–present
- Labels: Decca, Canis Major, Special Friends
- Members: Phil Keaggy; John Sferra; Daniel Pecchio
- Past members: Tim Burks; Randy Benson; Steve Markulin; John Carazino
- Website: www.glassharp.net

Glass Harp are a rock band formed in Youngstown, Ohio in 1968 consisting of Phil Keaggy, drummer John Sferra and bassist Daniel Pecchio.

== Early years ==
Phil Keaggy was a member of a mid-1960s garage rock band called the Squires; one of their songs, which he co-wrote, appears on the compilation album Highs in the Mid-Sixties, Volume 9. In 1967 he moved on to briefly record with the band The New Hudson Exit. At one point, the band had apparently considered Joe Walsh as lead guitarist. Walsh would later establish himself as guitarist for the James Gang before embarking on a solo career and working with Eagles.

In 1968, Keaggy and longtime friend drummer John Sferra, along with bassist Steve Markulin, formed the band Glass Harp. The band gigged in and around the Youngstown, Ohio area, finding work anywhere from school dances to clubs. This incarnation of the band recorded several demos and released the single "Where Did My World Come From?" on the United Audio label in 1969.

Markulin left the group to join his cousin Joe in another successful Youngstown band, The Human Beinz. John Carazino then briefly served as bassist, after which Keaggy and Sferra recruited bass player Daniel Pecchio. Pecchio, formerly of the band The Poppy, was also a flautist, a talent that would later be showcased on a few of Glass Harp's songs. Having recorded a new set of demos and signing with new management, the band set out to polish their live act and shop for a recording deal.

== 1970–1973 ==
The band quickly found a following in the thriving music scene of Northeast Ohio, particularly alongside contemporaries such as The James Gang. Glass Harp were especially popular at the legendary JB's in Kent, Ohio, playing to packed houses during the volatile days surrounding the anti-war demonstrations at Kent State University.

With their latest demos having found the ears of Grammy Award-winning producer Lewis Merenstein, Glass Harp began work on their first album for the Decca label in the fall of 1970. The eponymous debut album and two subsequent studio albums were recorded in Jimi Hendrix's Electric Lady Studios with Merenstein as producer.

Following the release of their 1970 debut album with guest John Cale on viola, Glass Harp soon began getting more high-profile opening spots for some of the biggest bands of the day, such as Alice Cooper, Chicago, Yes, Traffic, Humble Pie, and Grand Funk Railroad, among many others.

Contrary to the tight production and song-oriented nature of their studio albums, the band's live shows at the time demonstrated Glass Harp's ability to stretch out and expand the boundaries of their compositions. While Glass Harp could be classed among the progressive rock bands of the era, they were in fact one of the pioneers of what would later be known as the jam rock genre, with songs many times reaching over 30 minutes in length with extended solo passages and group improvisation.

By 1971, Glass Harp became one of the most popular (if not one of the highest-paid) groups in Northeast Ohio. This led to both supporting and headlining shows nationally from The Fillmore East to The Winterland Ballroom. On November 21, 1971, the band played an opening spot for The Kinks at New York City's prestigious Carnegie Hall, receiving a thunderous ovation at the end of their hour-long set. This performance was released as the Live At Carnegie Hall album in 1997.

1972 would be a pivotal year for the group. Having recently released a second album (Synergy) Glass Harp were asked to perform a live concert on PBS in February. This broadcast would become groundbreaking in that it was one of the first to be simulcast on both television and the then-nascent FM radio. While an off-air recording of this performance was heavily bootlegged on video for decades, the master tape was later located and subsequently released on DVD as Circa 72 2006.

On August 6, 1972 (shortly before their third studio album It Makes Me Glad was released) Phil Keaggy played his final show with Glass Harp at My Father's Place, Roslyn, New York before embarking on a solo career. Having already written Christian-themed lyrics throughout his time in Glass Harp, Keaggy found an audience in the burgeoning Jesus music scene, and later achieved worldwide fame as both a songwriter and instrumentalist as it evolved into Contemporary Christian Music.

With a tour of East Coast colleges and universities having already been booked for September 1972 in support of It Makes Me Glad, Sferra and Pecchio replaced Keaggy with guitarist Tim Burks. In April 1973, violinist Randy Benson (formerly of Tiny Alice) was added to the lineup. The music of the four-piece lineup took on a more progressive edge, similar to King Crimson and The Moody Blues (while studio and live radio broadcast recordings exist from this period, they remain officially unreleased as of 2012). This brief incarnation of the group lasted into October 1973, when they reverted to the trio of Sferra/Pecchio/Burks following Benson's departure. Their last known concert before disbanding was on December 2, 1973 at Norwalk High School, Norwalk, Ohio. All three members immediately moved on to other projects. Sferra and Burks formed the short-lived group Hartship in 1974, while Pecchio became a founding member of the popular Michael Stanley Band.

== 1981–1997 ==
In April 1981, Glass Harp reunited when Sferra and Pecchio made surprise appearances at two consecutive Phil Keaggy solo concerts in Ohio (Cleveland's Masonic Auditorium on April 10, and Akron's Civic Theatre on April 11). Sferra and Pecchio would make a similar appearance at a Keaggy solo concert in Akron in 1986, before an official Glass Harp reunion show occurred at the Akron Civic Theatre on December 27, 1988

In 1993, John Sferra joined Phil Keaggy's band on the Crimson and Blue tour. At the tour's November 13 stop in Akron, OH (again at the Civic Theatre), Daniel Pecchio again joined with Keaggy/Sferra to perform several Glass Harp songs.

In January 1997, the Rock and Roll Hall of Fame in Cleveland, Ohio, opened an exhibit called "My Town." Because the exhibit focused on Cleveland's rock and roll history, Glass Harp were invited to give a special performance and Q&A session at the Museum in April 1997 Currently, Glass Harp is represented in the Museum's ongoing "Cleveland Rocks" exhibit.

On May 23–24, 1997, Glass Harp performed two consecutive sold-out concerts at the Civic Theatre in Akron, OH.

== 2000–2009 ==
On October 22, 2000 Glass Harp gave a sold out performance in their hometown of Youngstown, Ohio at Powers Auditorium. Joining the band for the occasion was conductor Isaiah Jackson and members of the Youngstown Symphony Orchestra. The following year saw the commercial release of the reunion concert in the form of the live double album Strings Attached. Although the album is largely devoted to the band's previous work, it also includes Glass Harp's take on several songs from Phil's solo career such as "Tender Love," "Chalice," "From the Beginning" and a solo acoustic version of "The True Believers."

In the summer of 2003, the group released Hourglass, their first new studio album in 31 years. Well received by fans and critics alike, the album drew on various musical styles that demonstrated Glass Harp's many influences and individual talents. In October, Glass Harp made a second appearance at the Rock and Roll Hall of Fame, again featuring a performance and a Q&A moderated by Rock Hall curator James Henke.

In 2004 the band went on a short U.S. tour in support of their triple-live album Stark Raving Jams (a collection of various live instrumental and improvisational material from throughout their career). The album/tour served to successfully re-introduce Glass Harp into the jam band scene, in which they are now considered a pioneering group.

In 2004, guitarists Greg Martin (of the Kentucky Headhunters) and Rick Derringer joined Glass Harp on stage at the Dallas International Guitar Festival. Martin again appeared with Glass Harp at the same festival in 2006.

Glass Harp's original Decca studio albums were re-issued on CD in 2005 by Music Mill Entertainment (having first been released on CD in 1993 by Line Records in Germany before quickly going out of print). These releases were remastered with bonus tracks and updated liner notes. As of early 2012, the three Glass Harp titles on Music Mill have gone out of print, and are not yet available for digital purchase.

In 2009, Sferra and Pecchio teamed up with Keaggy, Randy Stonehill and guitarist Mike Pachelli as "The Keaggy-Stonehill Band" and played a few dates in support of Keaggy and Stonehill's album Mystery Highway.

During the 2000s, Glass Harp's touring groups included (at various times) diverse instrumentation such as trumpets, trombones, saxophones, mandolins and violins. Most frequently, the band is joined by keyboardist Chris Queen, formerly of the Athens, Georgia, funk band Mr. Tibbs (a group which also included Ted Pecchio, Daniel Pecchio's son, on bass).

== 2010–present ==
On March 27, 2010, Glass Harp released Live at the Beachland Ballroom 11.01.08. The album was more experimental and free-form in nature than previous Glass Harp recordings, and includes extended versions of older material bridged together by the nearly-sixteen-minute "Beachland Jam". The ten-song project included material from Phil's solo career: "Sign Came through a Window" and "John the Revelator." The album is a recording of a benefit concert that Glass Harp headlined for Roots of American Music (www.rootsofamericanmusic.org), "an organization dedicated to the preservation, performance and education about traditional American music in our schools."

In March 2011 Glass Harp's post-Decca catalog was released on iTunes, and many other streaming/digital services.

On May 7, 2011, guitarist Neil Zaza joined Glass Harp for two songs during their concert at Cleveland's Beachland Ballroom.

In March 2012 Keaggy, Sferra and Pecchio performed four concerts in the Eastern U.S. billed as "The Phil Keaggy Band" rather than "Glass Harp".

Glass Harp remain semi-active as of 2016, performing one-off headlining shows and short tours. In addition, Daniel Pecchio and John Sferra occasionally appear with Phil Keaggy for an electric set during the guitarist's solo performances in or around Ohio. In an August 2012 interview, Keaggy said "Especially this past year I've gotten extra comfortable playing with Glass Harp, we've been lifelong friends. We really love each other as friends and brothers."

== Discography ==
- "Where Did My World Come From?"/"She Told Me" 1969 (single). Available for free mp3 download at the band's website
- Glass Harp 1970
- Synergy 1971
- It Makes Me Glad 1972
- Song in the Air (compilation) 1977
- Live at Carnegie Hall 1997
- Strings Attached 2001
- Hourglass 2003
- Stark Raving Jams 2004
- Live at the Beachland Ballroom 11/01/08 2010

== Videography ==
- Circa 72, 2006 DVD

== Reviews ==
- 2002 Concert review from Jam Base
