= Elliott Landy =

American photographer and writer (born 1942)

- Born: 1942 (age 83–84)
- Known for: Photography

Elliott Landy (born 1942) is an American photographer and writer. Best known for his iconic photographs from the Sixties Classic Rock period, Elliott Landy was one of the first "music photographers" to be recognized as an "artist".

== Biography ==
A graduate of the Bronx High School of Science and The Baruch College of the City University of New York, Landy began his photographic career working with underground newspapers to express his own "visual voice" in support of the rising tide of anti-war sentiment throughout the United States during the late 1960s.

His press pass and camera not only gave him access to the political scene but also provided him a personal entry into the new rock music counterculture. Albert Grossman who managed the careers of many of the most popular and successful performers of folk and rock music including Bob Dylan, Janis Joplin, Peter, Paul and Mary, Richie Havens and The Band had seen Landy's images of Janis Joplin and invited him to photograph The Band; those photographs were used on the Music From Big Pink album. During this time, he met Bob Dylan and his photo of him appeared on the cover of the September ‘68 edition of The Saturday Evening Post.

Within the next few years his celebrated images included portraits of Bob Dylan (Nashville Skyline), The Band (Music From Big Pink), Janis Joplin (Big Brother & The Holding Company: Cheap Thrills), Van Morrison (Moondance), Jimi Hendrix, Jim Morrison, Joan Baez, Eric Clapton, Jefferson Airplane, Santana, Frank Zappa, John Lee Hooker and many others.

His iconic photographs of Dylan and The Band during the years they resided and recorded in the small arts colony of Woodstock, New York, and his coverage of the 1969 Woodstock Festival captured the attention of a new generation seeking spiritual and artistic freedom. His imagery has become synonymous with the town, the famed 1969 Music Festival and the Utopian spirit of the Woodstock Generation.

Since 1967 Elliott’s work has been exhibited in galleries and museums worldwide and published on the covers of major US and international magazines and newspapers including the New York Times, Life, Rolling Stone and the Saturday Evening Post.

He is represented worldwide by Magnum Photos, Getty, and several other local photo agencies.

He is the author of 8 books including his latest monograph, The Band Photographs, 1968–1969 which was the highest funded photographic book in Kickstarter history.

In 1990, Landy Directed and Produced an award-winning video which appealed to both children and adults, “Table Manners For Everyday Use” Table Manners Site

Around 1997 he began a syndicated column and website to recommend positive life-affirming films and films with strong, loving, accomplished woman as protagonists. The website still exists but has been in hiatus since 1998. UpliftingFilms.com

He has created a new interactive music and video App, LandyVision, which lets the user blend still and video imagery with music to create a new form of musical and visual experience. It will be released in late 2018.

After years of metaphysical observation, Landy developed and offers “Sharing Stillness” Meditations, in which he transmits a spiritual (non-physical) energy that enables one to quickly reach a deep, meditative state. SharingStillness.com

His latest work includes:

- Flower Power – Impressionistic photographs evocative but not imitative of the master Impressionist painters.
- Kaleidoscapes – photographs of New York City taken through a kaleidoscopic lens.
- People Taking Pictures – exploring the joy people experience while taking photographs.
- Love at Sixty – a photo verite book that captures the spontaneity of life and the wonder of love at any age – a photographic love poem by Elliott and Lynda Landy

Throughout Landy's life and career, he has photographed what he "...found beautiful in his own life, including counterculture music, nature, family, and his children. He continues to create images that represent what he perceives as reflecting purity, innocence and non-attachment to perceived normal reality.” Landy lives in Woodstock, New York, with his wife, Lynda.

== Photographic books ==
The Band Photographs 1968–1969 –2016. Fine Art. Landyvision Inc./Backbeat Books, 160 pages, 12x12 inches.
Elliott Landy's Opening Night -2015. Imperial Pictures Ltd.
Elliott Landy, Yellowkorner Portfolio 10 –2013. Yellowkorner, FR, US, UK, EU
Woodstock Vision, The Spirit of a Generation (expanded edition) —2009. Includes a 1969 Woodstock festival section. Backbeat Books, 224 pages
Woodstock 69, The First Festival Woodstock – 2008. Reprinted in France by Editions Fetjaine, France; In UK by Ravette
Dylan in Woodstock – 1999. Genesis Editions, UK, Photographic Book, Edition limited to 1,750 copies, 128 pages
Woodstock Dream – 1999 & 2000. Frederico Motta (Italy), TeNeues (USA, Germany), Actes Sud (France). 400 pages.
Woodstock 69, The First Festival –1994. Squarebooks, USA. Produced and edited by Elliott Landy containing photos from 11 photographers as well as his own. 156 pages
Woodstock Vision, The Spirit of a Generation —1994. Continuum, New York. Photographic Book, 128 pages
Woodstock Vision —1984. Rowohlt Verlag, Germany. 96 pages

== Digital multimedia ==
2015–Present – LandyVision™ - LandyVision, inc. A new type of App that lets the user blend both still and moving imagery with music to create a new interactive sound and visual experience. In development, expected release, winter 2018. Conceptualization, development and content creation.
1997- "Elliott Landy's Woodstock Vision", 1997 – Panasonic Interactive, USA – CD-ROM and book (128 pgs, 9.5 x 11 in.) box set. Developer and Content provider
1994- The Woodstock Festival – Time Warner Interactive. Co-producer – CD-ROM about the ‘69 festival.

== Major public solo exhibitions ==
Bethel Woods Museum (Woodstock Festival site) – Permanent
Elliott's photos are used on approximately 50% of the permanent wall design.
Museum of the Jewish People, Tel Aviv, Israel May 2016 – January 2018
Jessica Hagen Gallery, Newport, Rhode Island August 2 – 18, 2017
Newport Antiques Show, Newport, Rhode Island July 25–30, 2017
The Gallery at Rhinebeck, Rhinebeck, New York May 2017
The EGG Center for the Performing Arts Theatre, Albany, New York (slide show and talk) -2017
Desert Trip Music Festival, Coachella, California, October 2016
Proud Gallery, London, UK, June 9 – July 24, 2016
Gallerie Huit, Arles, France (2 exhibitions) May 6 – June 30, 2016
Hotel de Gallifet Contemporary Art Museum, Aix-en-Provence, France, June 2015
Cradle of Aviation Museum, Garden City, New York, June–September 2014
Norton Museum of Art, West Palm Beach, Florida, August 2012
Mois du Graphism d'Echirolles, Echirolles, France, November 2010
Montreal Jazz Festival Center, Montreal, Canada, October 2010
European Festival of Fine Art Nude Photography, Arles, FR, May 2010, 2012
Sausalito Art Festival, Sausalito, California, September 2009,
La Biblioteca Jaume Fuster, Barcelona, Spain, July 2009
FNAC (Madrid, Spain) October 2009; (Asturias, Spain) November 2009; (Zargoza, Spain) August 2009, (Bilbao, Spain) June 2009
Artist-in-Residence SUNY Ulster (Stoneridge, New York) 2008
The Tate Liverpool, England, May – Sept. 2005, 14 Prints, ‘The Summer of Love’ Exhibition The Schirn Kunsthalle (Frankfurt, Germany) Nov. - Feb. 2006 14 Prints,‘The Summer of Love’ Exhibition
Kunsthalle (Vienna, Austria) Summer 2006 14 Prints,‘The Summer of Love’ Exhibition
The Whitney Museum of American Art (New York) 2007 14 Prints, The Summer of Love’ Exhibition
FotoFusion, Palm Beach Photographic Centre, Delray Beach, Florida 2006
Southern Vermont Arts Center, Manchester, Vermont, 2005
Internationale Fototage, Contemporary American Photography, Manheim Germany 2005
The New York State Museum, Albany, New York, 2004
Wine Country Film Festival – Sonoma, California – 2004
Buddy Holly Arts Center, Lubbock, Texas – 2004
The Fairfield Arts Museum, Wisconsin, 2004
The Hot Springs Convention Center, Arkansas, 2004 Oregon State Fair – Official Exhibition, Portland, Oregon, 2003
Rhubarb Photo Festival, Birmingham, UK 2003
The Provincial Museum of Alberta, Edmonton, Canada 2002
(prior exhibitions not listed)

== Bibliography ==
- Landy, Elliott. Woodstock Vision: The Spirit of a Generation, Afterword by Richie Havens, Woodstock, New York: Landy Vision. 1994. ISBN 0-9625073-4-2.
- Landy, Elliott. Woodstock 69, The First Festival: 3 Days of Peace & Music, Squarebooks. 1994. ISBN 0-916290-75-1.
