= John Platania =

American musician (born 1948)

- Born: Ulster County, New York, U.S.
- Genres: Rock; blues
- Instrument: Guitar
- Years active: 1970–present
- Labels: Train Wreck; Warner Bros.
- Website: www.johnplatania.com

John Platania is an American session musician, guitar player, and record producer. He was born in 1948 in New York’s Mid-Hudson Valley, in Ulster County, near Woodstock.

== Career ==
=== Van Morrison ===
Platania is best known for his work with Van Morrison, beginning on Moondance, and most recently on 2016's Keep Me Singing. In 1973 he toured with Morrison as a member of his band at the time The Caledonia Soul Orchestra. The double live album It's Too Late to Stop Now was released in 1974, which included songs from three nights of the tour.

Platania also co-wrote two songs with Morrison, on his compilation album of out-takes The Philosopher's Stone, as well as playing guitar on several of the tracks on disc one.

In July 1980, Platania played guitar with Van Morrison's band at the Montreux Jazz Festival, and appeared on the issued DVD Live at Montreux 1980/1974 (2006).

In 2006, Platania again reunited with Van Morrison, touring on Morrison's "Pay the Devil" tour and continued playing with the Van Morrison band in 2008.

On September 15, 2006, he played in Van Morrison's band at the Austin City Limits Music Festival. A limited edition live album was issued from this concert — Live at Austin City Limits Festival. He also appeared with Morrison in the Austin City Limits film that was made for television and shown in November 2006 on the CMT television channel.

He played guitar on several of the tracks on the March 2008 release of Morrison's thirty-third studio album Keep It Simple.

He again played guitar on several of the tracks on the September 2016 release of Morrison's thirty-sixth studio album Keep Me Singing.

=== Giants ===
In 1976, Platania formed a band in Los Angeles called Giants. Its members included Ron Elliott, formerly of The Beau Brummels, with Karl Rucker from the post-Jim Morrison Doors, and Bruce Gary, drummer who went on to The Knack.

=== Solo works ===
In 2002, Platania released his solo debut Lucky Dog, a collaboration with cartoon artist Elwood H. Smith.

In 2007, Platania released his second and predominantly instrumental CD entitled 'Blues Waltzes and Badland Borders'. The album features narration by artists such as Jon Voight and Alejandro Escovedo.

=== Work with others ===
Platania played on numerous albums for Chip Taylor, songwriter of "Wild Thing" and "Angel of the Morning" and from 1974 through 1982, he recorded and or performed with Randy Newman, Bonnie Raitt, Natalie Merchant and Judy Collins.

Platania began working with Don McLean in 1981 playing as his accompanist on every US, Canadian and overseas tour until 1996. John Platania has never been on any records with Don McLean, only on the road. In 2007, Don McLean said "John Platania has been a great friend. He was a completely reliable, fantastically inspired, hard-working, funny and wise human being. I feel very fortunate to have found him and very fortunate that he was willing to devote as much of his time to me and my music as he did" (Howard, 2007).

In 1983, he produced and wrote the score for the Emmy winning musical revue None for the Road, a public service production to educate young people about the dangers of drinking, drugs and driving.

Platania has worked as a producer on six albums for Guy Davis. He also produced Davis’s "I Will Be Your Friend,” the title song for the Southern Poverty Law Center’s "anti-hate" compilation CD.

Platania has also worked with Davis on songs for tribute CDs to Charley Patton and Nick Lowe. He composed the music for Sail Production’s stage version of Harriet Tubman, which toured the United States during Black History Month.

From the 2010s to present, he has been the guitarist for Chip Taylor's backup band, The New Ukrainians.

== Discography ==
=== Solo albums ===
- 2002: Lucky Dog (Double Dog)
- 2007: Blues, Waltzes And Badland Borders (Train Wreck)

=== With Van Morrison ===
- 1970: Moondance (Warner Bros.)
- 1970: His Band and the Street Choir (Warner Bros.)
- 1973: Hard Nose the Highway (Warner Bros.)
- 1974: It's Too Late to Stop Now (Warner Bros.)
- 1986: No Guru, No Method, No Teacher (Mercury
- 1998: The Philosopher's Stone (Polydor)
- 2006: Live at Austin City Limits Festival (Exile)
- 2008: Keep It Simple (Polydor / Exile)
- 2009: Astral Weeks Live at the Hollywood Bowl (Listen To The Lion)
- 2016: Keep Me Singing (Exile)
- 2016: It's Too Late to Stop Now...Vols. II, III, IV and DVD (Legacy / Sony)

=== With Chip Taylor ===
- 1972: Gasoline (Buddah)
- 1973: Chip Taylor's Last Chance (Warner Bros.)
- 1974: Some of Us (Warner Bros.)
- 1975: This Side of the Big River (Warner Bros.)
- 1976: Somebody Shoot Out The Jukebox (Columbia) with Ghost Train
- 2000: The London Sessions Bootleg (Train Wreck)
- 2001: Black and Blue America (Train Wreck)
- 2006: Unglorious Hallelujah (Back Porch)
- 2008: New Songs of Freedom (Train Wreck)
- 2009: Yonkers NY (Train Wreck)
- 2012: Golden Kids Rules (Train Wreck)
- 2012: F**k All the Perfect People (Train Wreck)
- 2014: Little Prayers Trilogy (Train Wreck)
- 2016: Little Brothers (Train Wreck)
- 2017: A Song I Can Live With (Train Wreck)

=== With Chip Taylor and Carrie Rodriguez ===
- 2002: Let's Leave This Town (Texas Music Group / Lone Star)
- 2003: The Trouble with Humans (Texas Music Group / Lone Star)
- 2004: Angel of the Morning (Texas Music Group / Lone Star)
- 2010: The New Bye & Bye (Train Wreck)

=== With Chip Taylor and Kendel Carson ===
- 2011: Rock & Roll Joe (Train Wreck)

=== With Giants ===
- 1976: Thanks for the Music (Casablanca)

=== With Guy Davis ===
- 2000: Butt Naked Free (Red House)
- 2002: Give In Kind (Red House)
- 2003: Chocolate to the Bone (Red House)
- 2004: Legacy (Red House)
- 2008: Skunkmello (Red House)
- 2009: Sweetheart Like You (Red House)
- 2015: Kokomo Kidd (M.C.)

=== With Nik Rael (as producer) ===
- 2003: Nik Rael - Worlds Fade Away (Bermuda Reef)
- 2009: Nik Rael - Thank You (Bermuda Reef)
- 2011: Nik Rael - Winter '61 (Bermuda Reef)

=== As producer ===
- 1998: Kim & Reggie Harris - In the Heat of the Summer (Folk Era)
- 2002: [Amy Fradon - Small Town News (Leo Rising)

=== As guest artist ===
- 1971: Gary Kuper - Shoot for the Moon (Polydor)
- 1972: Genya Ravan - Genya Ravan (Columbia)
- 1972: Martha Veléz - Hypnotized (Polydor)
- 1974: Randy Newman - Good Old Boys (Reprise)
- 1982: Gary Windo - Dogface (Europa)
- 1995: Liv Cummins - "Some Days" (22 records)
- 2002: Professor Louie & The Crowmatix - Flyin' High (Woodstock)
- 2003: Carla Werner - Departure (Columbia)
- 2003: Ed Jurdi - Longshores Drive (Red Fez)
- 2004: Emma's Revolution - One (Big W Productions)
- 2007: Kendel Carson - Rearview Mirror Tears (Train Wreck)
- 2008: Professor Louie & The Crowmatix - As the Crow Flies (Woodstock)
- 2009: Kendel Carson - Alright Dynamite (Train Wreck)
- 2011: MJ Nelson and The Vinyls - Rock-Ola (Double Cross)
- 2012: Kim & Reggie Harris - Resurrection Day (Appleseed)
- 2014: Mister Roper - Mister Roper (Red Parlor)
