= Jef Labes =

American keyboardist and musician (born 1947)

- Born: Jeffery Labes; June 26, 1947 (age 78)
- Origin: Boston, Massachusetts
- Genres: Rock, R&B, Folk, Blues, Jazz
- Occupations: Musician, Business
- Instruments: Keyboards, Recorder
- Years active: 1968–present
- Labels: Atlantic, Warner Bros., Atco, London, Gold Castle, Elektra, Mercury, Jazzman
- Website: www.jeflabes.com

Jef Labes is an American keyboardist and musician. He is best known from his work with Van Morrison and Bonnie Raitt. Jef Labes has also arranged for string and woodwind instruments on numerous albums.

== Career ==
Labes started his recording career with the Boston-based Apple Pie Motherhood Band, playing piano and organ on the albums Apple Pie & Motherhood (1968), composing four of the tracks himself and Apple Pie (1969), this time composing one track. The band split up later in 1969 and did not make another album.

In the same year Labes moved to Woodstock to join Van Morrison as a live musician. At this time Labes had been shown the music for three songs off Morrison's "classic" album Astral Weeks in the studio, and was recording with the band Morrison had used for the album. All these musicians were replaced in the summer of 1969, leaving only Labes. The new musicians, along with Labes, were used for the recording of Morrison's third solo album Moondance. In an interview with Clinton Heylin, Labes points out the inconvenience of recording in New York for the album: "We lived in Woodstock. So any time we did a session, we'd drive down a hundred miles and then we'd drive back." Labes left Morrison's band shortly after the release of Moondance to move to Israel for a couple of years.

In 1971 Labes recorded with Jonathan Edwards and appeared on his self entitled debut album Jonathan Edwards. In Lindsay Planer's allmusic review of the album, Labes is praised for his "rural-flavored piano licks" and the "definite sense of drama" he brings to the album. In 1972 both Labes and Edwards joined Orphan on their album Everyone Lives to Sing.

After this association with Jonathan Edwards, Labes returned to Van Morrison's band, playing piano and writing string arrangements for his seventh studio album Hard Nose the Highway, released in 1973. He is also credited on the album as assistant producer. Morrison had recently assembled an eleven-piece band for his concerts, The Caledonia Soul Orchestra, which Labes had joined to play piano and organ in early 1973, replacing the previous keyboard player James Trumbo. The band included the string section Labes had arranged for on Hard Nose the Highway, so he was asked to arrange string parts for some more of Morrison's songs for the live performances. The double live album It's Too Late to Stop Now was released the following year of highlights from three concerts in the summer of the tour. After the tour ended Morrison dismantled the band and Labes was, this time, replaced by Trumbo. Although he was not touring with Morrison, Labes was asked to play on two tracks on Morrison's next studio album, Veedon Fleece, whilst his string and woodwind arrangements were dubbed onto most of the other recordings on the album.

In 1975 Labes was invited to play synthesizer and write arrangements for the former bassist of The Caledonia Soul Orchestra, David Hayes, on his album Logos Through a Sideman. Also in 1975 Labes played keyboards for Bonnie Raitt on her album Home Plate and for her next studio album Sweet Forgiveness released in 1977. A year later Labes joined the American singer–songwriter Jesse Colin Young to play on his album American Dreams. In 1979 Labes returned to Bonnie Raitt's band for the No Nukes protest concert. Bonnie Raitt performs on two tracks that made it onto the album released of the concert. Also in 1979, Labes composed a triptych called Letters for the Northeastern University Choral Society, which received its world premiere in May of that year.

The following year Labes made a return to Van Morrison's band, using his skills in arranging to produce string parts for Morrison's album Common One. He also contributed to the tour that succeeded the release of the album, and features on the 2006 DVD of a 1980 concert: Live at Montreux 1980/1974. After six years Labes performed on another Morrison album, No Guru, No Method, No Teacher and the tour that followed, featuring a recreation of The Caledonia Soul Orchestra.

== Solo discography ==
- Back in the Sack (1996)
- I'm Holding Out (2000)
- Dream Keeper (2018)

== Discography with other artists ==
=== Apple Pie Motherhood Band ===
- Apple Pie & Motherhood (1968)
- Apple Pie (1969)

=== Van Morrison ===
- Moondance (1970)
- Hard Nose the Highway (1973)
- It's Too Late to Stop Now (1974)
- Veedon Fleece (1974)
- Common One (1980)
- No Guru, No Method, No Teacher (1986)
- The Philosopher's Stone (1998)
- Live at Montreux 1980/1974 (2006)

=== Jonathan Edwards ===
- Jonathan Edwards (1971)

=== Orphan ===
- Everyone Lives to Sing (1972)

=== David Hayes ===
- Logos Through a Sideman (1975)

=== Bonnie Raitt ===
- Sweet Forgiveness (1977)

The Bonnie Raitt Collection (Warner Bros.)

=== Jesse Colin Young ===
- American Dreams (1978)

=== Anastasi ===
- Cinem Ocean (1995)

=== Chris Michie ===
- Tough Love (1998)
- A Fourth Wave of Bay Area Blues: A Collection of Contemporary Blues Songs, Vol. 4 (2005) (various artists)

=== Dan Buegeleisen ===
- West Coast Alternative (2001)

=== Slim ===
- Interstate Medicine (2002)

=== Spike James and the Names ===
- Spike James and the Names (2012)
- The self titled debut album featuring Jeff Labes on Keyboards on 6 tracks from the album, "I Wanna Be Your Lover", "Long Live Summertime", "Sarah", "What We Need", "Shadows in Lorraine" & "Rescue Me".

== See also ==
List of keyboardists
