= Lewis Merenstein =

American record producer (1934–2016)

Background information
- Born: October 23, 1934; Baltimore, Maryland, U.S.
- Died: September 6, 2016 (aged 81) New York City, New York, U.S.
- Occupation: Record producer
- Years active: 1959–1970s

Lewis Merenstein (October 23, 1934 – September 6, 2016) was an American record producer, most famous as the producer of the Van Morrison album Astral Weeks, and as executive producer for Moondance, Morrison's 1970 album. Astral Weeks was listed as #19 on the Rolling Stone Magazine's The 500 Greatest Albums of All Time in 2003. In November 2006, when CNN published their list of The All-Time 100 Albums, Astral Weeks was on the list, along with Moondance.

== Biography ==
Merenstein was born on October 23, 1934, to a German-Jewish immigrant family in Baltimore, Maryland. His aunt was Bess (née Merenstein) Berman, co-founder of the Apollo record label; and his uncle was Charles Merenstein, a co-writer of the song Handy Man. He moved to New York City in the late 1950s and worked on jazz recordings at the Nola Penthouse studios with producer Tom Wilson. During the 1960s he began working as a producer in his own right on records by Miriam Makeba, Gladys Knight and others. Regarding Astral Weeks, Merenstein said:

Warner Bros. Records had contacted Bob Schwaid [Morrison's manager], and he contacted me. And they had sent some producers, and they didn't know what he was talking about; people went up expecting to hear "Brown Eyed Girl," because the year before he had had "Brown Eyed Girl" on Bang Records and that's what he was last known for. So Joe Smith and Mo Ostin asked me to go up [to Boston] and listen to him. And I went up and it was at Ace Recording Studio at 1 Boylston Place, and there was Van Morrison, very timidly sitting on a stool and I came in very timidly sitting on a stool and he played! And the first tune he played was "Astral Weeks." Thirty seconds into it, my whole being was vibrating, because having spent all that time with jazz players, when he was playing, I could hear—the lyric I got right away; I knew he was being reborn. I heard 30 seconds, a minute and it went right through me, and I got the poetry of it. It was just stunning, and I knew I wanted to work with him at that moment. He went on and played more things, various tunes. And I guess everything was agreed on...

After further rehearsals, Morrison and Merenstein went into the studio to record. Merenstein said: that

...it was just beautiful, just beautiful. I forget if we did one take, two takes, how many times I may have interrupted it and asked the band to soften it up a little bit and maybe move the tempo a little bit. Van had nothing to say. He just went and sang the song. That's primarily the way the album proceeded...

Additionally, he produced albums for Biff Rose, Charlie Musselwhite, Barry Goldberg, The Spencer Davis Group, Cass Elliot, The Mamas & the Papas, John Cale, Curtis Mayfield, Charlie Daniels, The Association, Turley Richards, Alexander Harvey, Les Variations, George Burns[Garland Jeffreys]] and Phyllis Hyman. Merenstein also produced the three studio albums recorded by Glass Harp in the early 1970s, featuring guitarist Phil Keaggy.

== Personal life ==
Merenstein died on September 6, 2016, of complications due to pneumonia in New York City. Services were held at Riverside Memorial Chapel in Manhattan.
