= Rich Mullins discography =

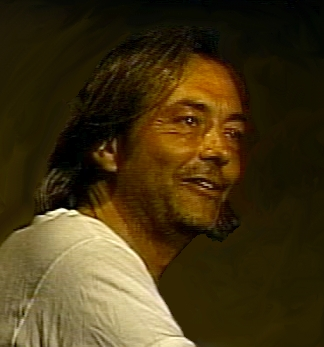
- Rich Mullins on July 19, 1997 during his concert in Lufkin, Texas
- Studio albums: 9
- Compilation albums: 6
- Singles: 17
- Musical: 1

The discography of Rich Mullins includes nine studio albums, six compilations, and 17 singles.

== Albums ==
=== Studio albums ===
- Rich Mullins (1986)
- Pictures in the Sky (1987)
- Winds of Heaven, Stuff of Earth (1988)
- Never Picture Perfect (1989)
- The World as Best as I Remember It, Vol. 1 (1991)
- The World as Best as I Remember It, Vol. 2 (1992)
- A Liturgy, A Legacy, & A Ragamuffin Band (1993)
- Brother's Keeper (1995)
- The Jesus Record (1998, posthumous)

=== Compilations ===
- Songs (1996)
- Songs 2 (1999)
- Here in America (2003)
- Simply Rich Mullins (2005)
- The Best of Rich Mullins: Platinum Series (2006)
- Triple Feature: Rich Mullins / The World as Best as I Remember It, Vols. 1 & 2 (2010)

=== Live albums ===
- Deep Valley (2023)

=== Video albums ===
- Pursuit of a Legacy (1994)

== Singles ==
| Year | Single | CCM peak chart positions | | | | Album |
| Year | Single | Inspo | AC | CHR | Rock | Album |
|---|---|---|---|---|---|---|
| 1986 | "Elijah" "A Few Good Men"; 7" promo single | 26 – | 26; 12 | – 12 | – 19 | Rich Mullins |
| 1986 | "These Days" "Live Right"; 7" promo single | 29 – | 29 – | – – | – – | Rich Mullins |
| 1987 | "Verge of a Miracle" "It Don't Do"; 12" promo single | 9 – | 1 – | 5 – | – – | Pictures in the Sky |
| 1987 | "Pictures in the Sky"; 7" promo single | 15 | 2 | 4 | – | Pictures in the Sky |
| 1988 | "Awesome God" "Rich Mullins on the Awesomeness of God"; 7" promo single | 4 – | 1 – | 3 – | – – | Winds of Heaven, Stuff of Earth |
| 1988 | "The Other Side of the World"; 7" promo single | 14 | 5 | 13 | – | Winds of Heaven, Stuff of Earth |
| 1989 | "If I Stand" "How Can I Keep Myself From Singing"; 7" promo single | 3 – | 3 – | 8 – | – – | Winds of Heaven, Stuff of Earth |
| 1992 | "Sometimes by Step (Radio Edit)" "Sometimes by Step (Album Version)"; CD promo single | 1 – | 1 – | 19 – | – – | The World as Best as I Remember It, Vol. 2 |
| 1993 | "Growing Young" "Growing Young (With Intro)"; CD promo single | 7 – | 5 – | – – | – – | The World as Best as I Remember It, Vol. 2 |
| 1993 | "Hold Me Jesus"; CD promo single | 2 | 1 | – | – | A Liturgy, A Legacy, & A Ragamuffin Band |
| 1993 | "Creed (Radio Edit)" "Creed (Album Version)"; CD promo single Adjust The Volume So The World Can Hear! w/ Gary Chapman & Kathy Troccoli | 15 – | 1 – | 9 – | – – | A Liturgy, A Legacy, & A Ragamuffin Band |
| 1993 | "Peace (Radio Edit)" "Peace (Album Version)"; CD promo single | 21 – | 7 – | – – | – – | A Liturgy, A Legacy, & A Ragamuffin Band |
| 1995 | "Brother's Keeper"; CD promo single The Brother's Keeper Tour Disc w/ Ashley Cleveland & Carolyn Arends | – | 4 | – | – | Brother's Keeper |
| 1996 | "Damascus Road"; CD promo single | – | 21 | – | – | Brother's Keeper |
| 1996 | "Sing Your Praise to the Lord (Album Version)" "Sing Your Praise to the Lord (Radio Edit)"; CD promo single | – 2 | – 8 | – 20 | – – | Songs |
| 1998 | "My Deliverer (Album Version)" "My Deliverer (Radio Edit)" "My Deliverer (Remix 1)" "My Deliverer (Remix 2)" "My Deliverer (Original Version)"; CD promo single | 10 – – – – – | 1 – – – – – | 13 – – – – – | – – – – – – | The Jesus Record |
| 1998 | "Nothing Is Beyond You (Radio Edit)" - Amy Grant "Nothing Is Beyond You (Album Version)" - Amy Grant "Nothing Is Beyond You (Original Version)" "The Jesus Record Radio Special"; CD promo single | 10 – – – | 1 – – – | 13 – – – | – – – – | The Jesus Record |
| 2017 | "The Joy of Jesus (feat. Matt Maher, Mac Powell & Ellie Holcomb)"; Digital single | – | – | – | – | non-album single |
| 2023 | "Love of Another Kind (Live)"; Digital single | – | – | – | – | Deep Valley |

== Other charted songs ==
| Year | Title | CCM peak chart positions | | | | Album |
| Year | Title | Inspo | AC | CHR | Rock | Album |
|---|---|---|---|---|---|---|
| 1987 | "Screen Door" | – | 7 | 2 | – | Pictures in the Sky |
| 1988 | "Could Be a Celebration" | – | 29 | – | – | Pictures in the Sky |
| 1989 | "Such a Thing as Glory" | 24 | 28 | 9 | – | Winds of Heaven, Stuff of Earth |
| 1989 | "Ready for the Storm" | 21 | 11 | – | – | Winds of Heaven, Stuff of Earth |
| 1990 | "My One Thing" | – | 6 | 1 | – | Never Picture Perfect |
| 1990 | "Bound to Come to Some Trouble" | 2 | – | – | – | Never Picture Perfect |
| 1990 | "Higher Education and the Book of Love" | – | – | – | 25 | Never Picture Perfect |
| 1990 | "While the Nations Rage" | 6 | 1 | 2 | – | Never Picture Perfect |
| 1990 | "Alrightokuhuhamen" | – | 4 | 4 | – | Never Picture Perfect |
| 1990 | "The Love of God" | 20 | – | – | – | Never Picture Perfect |
| 1990 | "First Family" | – | 20 | – | – | Never Picture Perfect |
| 1991 | "Somewhere" | – | 29 | 8 | – | Never Picture Perfect |
| 1991 | "Boy Like Me/Man Like You" | 3 | 1 | 16 | – | The World as Best as I Remember It, Vol. 1 |
| 1991 | "Where You Are" | – | 3 | 3 | – | The World as Best as I Remember It, Vol. 1 |
| 1992 | "Calling Out Your Name" | 16 | 2 | – | – | The World as Best as I Remember It, Vol. 1 |
| 1992 | "Jacob and 2 Women" | 21 | – | – | – | The World as Best as I Remember It, Vol. 1 |
| 1992 | "The Just Shall Live" | 13 | 3 | – | – | The World as Best as I Remember It, Vol. 2 |
| 1992 | "Hello Old Friends" | – | 18 | – | – | The World as Best as I Remember It, Vol. 2 |
| 1993 | "Everyman" | – | 11 | – | – | The World as Best as I Remember It, Vol. 2 |
| 1993 | "The Maker of Noses" | 21 | – | – | – | The World as Best as I Remember It, Vol. 2 |
| 1993 | "You Gotta Get Up" | – | 37 | – | – | A Liturgy, A Legacy, & A Ragamuffin Band |
| 1994 | "Here in America" | 8 | 4 | – | – | A Liturgy, A Legacy, & A Ragamuffin Band |
| 1994 | "How to Grow Up Big and Strong" | – | – | – | 20 | A Liturgy, A Legacy, & A Ragamuffin Band |
| 1994 | "Hard" | – | 10 | 21 | – | A Liturgy, A Legacy, & A Ragamuffin Band |
| 1995 | "I'll Carry On" | – | 33 | – | – | A Liturgy, A Legacy, & A Ragamuffin Band |
| 1995 | "Let Mercy Lead" | 6 | 1 | 21 | – | Brother's Keeper |
| 1996 | "We Are Not as Strong as We Think We Are" | 10 | 9 | – | – | Songs |
| 1997 | "Elijah" | 15 | 7 | – | – | Songs |
| 1999 | "That Where I Am, There You..." | 7 | 4 | – | – | The Jesus Record |

== Guest appearances and other contributions ==
- Behold the Man album by Zion (self-released, 1981)
- "You Are the One" – No Compromise: Remembering The Music of Keith Green (Sparrow Records, 1992)
- Canticle of the Plains musical soundtrack album (Ragamuffin Records, 1997)
- "Never Heard the Music (Demo)" and "Now (Demo)" – Music Inspired by the Motion Picture Ragamuffin (Capitol Christian Music Group, 2014)
- "Holy Pretenders" – Bellsburg – The Songs of Rich Mullins (Old Bear Records, 2022)
- "Hallelujah" – Worktapes – More Songs of Rich Mullins (Old Bear Records, 2023)
