= Songs (Rich Mullins album) =

Compilation album by Rich Mullins
- Released: July 30, 1996
- Genre: Contemporary Christian music
- Length: 67:39
- Label: Reunion
- Producer: Reed Arvin; Rich Mullins; A Ragamuffin Band

Rich Mullins chronology
Brother's Keeper (1995)	Songs (1996)	The Jesus Record (1998)

Songs is a compilation of well-known songs by American singer-songwriter Rich Mullins, released on July 30, 1996. It was the last album to be released by Mullins before his death in a car accident on September 19, 1997. A follow-up hits compilation, Songs 2, was released in 1999.

The album featured three new recordings: new versions of the previously recorded songs "Sing Your Praise to the Lord" and "Elijah", and a brand new track, "We Are Not as Strong as We Think We Are". In addition, the album featured the full-length radio single version of "Screen Door," which had been commercially unavailable prior to this release.

In 2001, Songs was certified as a Gold record (500,000 units sold) by the RIAA.

The album was nominated for "Recorded Music Packaging" of the year at the 1997 Dove Awards.

== Track listing ==
All tracks are written by Rich Mullins, except where noted.

No.	Title	Writer(s)	Originally released on	Length
1.	"Sing Your Praise to the Lord"		new recording of song	5:38
2.	"Awesome God"		Winds of Heaven, Stuff of Earth (1988)	3:03
3.	"Sometimes By Step"	Rich Mullins and Beaker	The World as Best as I Remember It, Volume Two (1992)	4:54
4.	"Creed"	Rich Mullins and Beaker	A Liturgy, a Legacy, & a Ragamuffin Band (1993)	5:22
5.	"We Are Not as Strong as We Think We Are"		new song	4:48
6.	"If I Stand"	Rich Mullins and Steve Cudworth	Winds of Heaven, Stuff of Earth (1988)	3:44
7.	"Screen Door"		Pictures in the Sky (1987)	2:11
8.	"Let Mercy Lead"	Rich Mullins and Beaker	Brother's Keeper (1995)	4:26
9.	"Elijah"		new recording of song from Rich Mullins (1986)	5:17
10.	"Calling Out Your Name"		The World as Best as I Remember It, Volume One (1991)	4:50
11.	"My One Thing"		Never Picture Perfect (1989)	3:50
12.	"Boy Like Me/Man Like You"	Rich Mullins and Beaker	The World as Best as I Remember It, Volume One (1991)	3:17
13.	"Alrightokuhuhamen"		Never Picture Perfect (1989)	4:12
14.	"While the Nations Rage"		Never Picture Perfect (1989)	4:51
15.	"Verge of a Miracle"		Pictures in the Sky (1987)	4;10
16.	"Hold Me Jesus"		A Liturgy, a Legacy, & a Ragamuffin Band (1993)	3:06

== Personnel (new songs) ==
- Rich Mullins – lead vocals
- Reed Arvin – acoustic piano, string arrangements (1)
- Blair Masters – keyboards
- Jerry McPherson – guitars
- David Cleveland – additional guitars (1, 9)
- Kenny Greenberg – additional guitars (5)
- Mark Hill – bass
- Chris McHugh – drums
- Carl Gorodetzky – string contractor (1)
- Lisa Cochran – backing vocals
- Michael Mellett – backing vocals

Production

- Don Donahue – executive producer
- Reed Arvin – producer (1–7, 9–16), additional engineer (1, 5, 9)
- Rich Mullins – producer (8)
- The Ragamuffin Band – producers (8)
- Tom Laune – engineer (1, 5, 9), mixing (1, 5, 9)
- Doug Sarrett – string engineer (1), additional engineer (1, 5, 9)
- Hank Williams – mastering at MasterMix, Nashville, Tennessee
- James Waddell – production assistant
- Diana Lussenden – art direction, design
- Ben Pearson – photography
- Recorded at OmniSound Studios, Nashville, Tennessee
- Engineered and Mixed at Battery Studios, Nashville, Tennessee
