= Awesome God: A Tribute to Rich Mullins =

1998 compilation album

Compilation album Rich Mullins by various artists
- Released: November 10, 1998
- Studios: MCA Music Media Studios (Hollywood, California); OmniSound Studios, Sixteenth Avenue Sound, Javelina Studios, Quad Studios, Sound Stage Studios, Whistler's Music, The Mission and Bridgeway Studios (Nashville, Tennessee); Uno Mas Studios (Brentwood, Tennessee); Dark Horse Recording and Hound's Ear Studio (Franklin, Tennessee); Walking Angel Studios (Dallas, Texas); Ambient Digital (Houston, Texas)
- Genre: Contemporary Christian music
- Length: 48:22
- Label: Reunion
- Producers: Reed Arvin (Tracks 1–8); Jars of Clay and Glenn Rosenstein (Track 7); Kevin Max (Track 9); Kenny Greenberg (Track 10); Caedmon's Call (Track 11)

Awesome God: A Tribute to Rich Mullins is a tribute album consisting of songs written by American singer and songwriter Rich Mullins, as recorded by popular contemporary Christian music artists. It was released on November 10, 1998, about a year after Mullins' death.

== Track listing ==
Note: All songs written by Rich Mullins, unless otherwise noted.

1. "Awesome God" (4:32) - Michael W. Smith
  - Mullins' version appeared on Winds of Heaven, Stuff of Earth 1988
2. "Jacob and 2 Women" (3:26) - Carolyn Arends
  - Mullins' version appeared on The World as Best as I Remember It, Volume One 1991
3. "Verge of a Miracle" (4:17) - Billy Crockett
  - Mullins' version appeared on Pictures in the Sky 1987
4. "Hold Me Jesus" (3:31) - Amy Grant
  - Mullins' version appeared on A Liturgy, a Legacy, & a Ragamuffin Band 1993
5. "Calling Out Your Name" (4:41) - Chris Rice
  - Mullins' version appeared on The World as Best as I Remember It, Volume One 1991
6. "Elijah" (5:07) - Gary Chapman
  - Mullins' version appeared on Rich Mullins 1986
7. "If I Stand" (Rich Mullins and Steve Cudworth) (3:52) - Jars of Clay
  - Mullins' version appeared on Winds of Heaven, Stuff of Earth 1988
8. "A Place to Stand" (5:09) - Billy Sprague
  - Mullins' version appeared on Rich Mullins 1986
9. "Save Me" (5:19) - Kevin Max
  - Mullins' version appeared on Rich Mullins 1986
10. "I See You" (5:06) - Ashley Cleveland
  - Mullins' version appeared on The World as Best as I Remember It, Volume One 1991
11. "Step by Step" (Beaker) (3:23) - Caedmon's Call
  - Mullins' version appeared on The World as Best as I Remember It, Volume One 1991

== Personnel ==
Lead vocalists

- Michael W. Smith (1)
- Carolyn Arends (2)
- Billy Crockett (3)
- Amy Grant (4)
- Chris Rice (5)
- Gary Chapman (6)
- Dan Haseltine (7)
- Billy Sprague (8)
- Kevin Max – all vocals (9)
- Ashley Cleveland (10)
- Cliff Young (11)

Musicians and Backing Vocalists

- Michael W. Smith – keyboards (1)
- Blair Masters – keyboards (3, 8), programming (3)
- Tim Lauer – Wurlitzer electric piano (4), accordion (4), harmonium (4), programming (4), guitars (4), live percussion (4), keyboards (5), percussion (5), additional guitars (6)
- Jeff Roach – keyboards (5)
- Tim Akers – keyboards (6)
- Phil Madeira – Hammond B3 organ (6)
- Charlie Lowell – accordion (7), melodica (7)
- Juggernaut – programming (9)
- Randy Holsapple – Hammond organ (11)
- Lincoln Brewster – guitar solo (1)
- Ron Block – acoustic guitar (2)
- Dan Tyminski – mandolin (2)
- Billy Crockett – acoustic guitar (3), mandolin (3)
- Charles Williams – dobro (3)
- George Cocchini – guitar solo (4), electric guitar (5, 6), guitars (8)
- Tom Hemby – acoustic guitar (5)
- Gary Chapman – acoustic guitar (6)
- Tommy White – steel guitar (6)
- Stephen Mason – guitars (7), backing vocals (7)
- Matt Odmark – guitars (7)
- Jimmy Abegg – guitars (9)
- Ashley Cleveland – acoustic guitar (10), backing vocals (10)
- Kenny Greenberg – electric guitar (10), baritone guitar (10)
- Derek Webb – guitars (11), vocals (11)
- Cliff Young – guitars (11)
- Matt Pierson – bass (1, 3, 5, 8)
- Barry Bales – acoustic bass (2)
- Danny O'Lannerghty – bass (6)
- Reed Arvin – electric upright bass (7), keyboards (8)
- Otto Price – bass (9)
- Michael Rhodes – bass (10)
- Aric Nitzberg – bass (11)
- Chris McHugh – drums (1)
- Jeffrey B. Thomas – drum programming (1)
- Steve Brewster – drums (2)
- Mark Hammond – drum programming (3, 4), additional drums (7)
- Michael Harrington – drums (5), loops (8)
- John Hammond – drums (6)
- Scott Savage – drums (7)
- Chris Griffin – drum programming (8), loops (8)
- Jonathan Smith – drum programming (8)
- James Waddell – drum programming (8), loops (8)
- Chad Cromwell – drums (10)
- Todd Bragg – drums (11)
- Eric Darken – percussion (5)
- Garret Buell – percussion (11)
- Tammy Rogers – fiddle (2)
- Sam Berot – cello (4)
- The Nashville String Machine – strings (1)
- Ronn Huff – string arrangements (1)
- Carl Gorodetzky – string contractor (1)
- Lisa Bevill – backing vocals (1, 3)
- Tim Davis – backing vocals (1, 3)
- Chris Harris – backing vocals (1)
- Michael Mellett – backing vocals (1)
- Nate Sallie – backing vocals (1)
- Aimee Joy Weimer – backing vocals (1, 8)
- Nathan Brown – backing vocals (3)
- Tabitha Fair – backing vocals (6)
- Kim Keyes – backing vocals (6)
- Rick Elias – backing vocals (10)
- Danielle Young – vocals (11)
