= List of Dove Award winners =

This is a list of artists who have won a Dove Award by the Gospel Music Association. The award was known as the GMA Music Award from 2004 to 2006.

== # ==
- 2nd Chapter of Acts
- 4Him

== A ==
- Addison Road
- Jimmy Abegg
- Yolanda Adams
- The Afters
- Carolyn Arends
- Audio Adrenaline
- Avalon

== B ==
- Rob Beckley
- The Blackwood Brothers
- Bleach
- The Blind Boys of Alabama
- Blue Highway
- Brown Bannister
- Building 429
- Burlap to Cashmere
- Bride
- By the Tree
- Marc Byrd

== C ==
- Candle
- Caedmon's Call
- Shirley Caesar
- Jeremy Camp
- Johnny Cash
- Ed Cash
- Casting Crowns
- Gary Chapman
- Steven Curtis Chapman
- The Choir
- Charlotte Church
- The Clark Sisters
- John Cooper
- The Crabb Family
- Andraé Crouch

== D ==
- David Crowder Band
- Day of Fire
- dc Talk
- DecembeRadio
- Brian Doerksen
- Downhere
- Phil Driscoll

== E ==
- East West
- Emilio Estefan
- Lester Estelle II
- Sara Evans

== F ==
- FFH
- First Call
- Aretha Franklin
- Kirk Franklin

== G ==
- GRITS
- Gaither Vocal Band
- Bill Gaither
- God's Property
- Amy Grant
- Natalie Grant

== H ==
- Fred Hammond
- Noah Henson
- Annie Herring
- Kathie Hill
- Kim Hill
- Steve Hindalong
- Mark Hoppus
- Whitney Houston
- Tim Hughes

== I ==
- The Imperials

== J ==
- Jars of Clay
- Jeremy Camp

== K ==
- Phil Keaggy
- Mat Kearney
- Alex Kendrick
- Stephen Kendrick
- Wes King
- The Kingsmen
- Jennifer Knapp

== L ==
- Rachael Lampa
- Lauryn Hill
- Leonardo
- Crystal Lewis
- Brian Littrell

== M ==
- The Martins
- Mary Mary
- Kevin Max
- TobyMac
- MercyMe
- Michelle Grigg
- Dave Meyers
- Mississippi Mass Choir
- Don Moen
- Dave Moody
- Geoff Moore
- Nicole C. Mullen
- Rich Mullins
- Mutemath
- MxPx
- Mitch McVicker

== N ==
- Michael Neale
- Newsboys
- NF
- Nichole Nordeman
- Smokie Norful
- Bebo Norman
- Natalie Grant

== O ==
- The Oak Ridge Boys
- The Old Friends Quartet
- Stacie Orrico
- Fernando Ortega
- Out of Eden

== P ==
- P.O.D.
- Brad Paisley
- Twila Paris
- Sandi Patty
- Paul Colman Trio
- Paul Meany
- Charlie Peacock
- Jill Phillips
- Pillar
- Point of Grace
- Mac Powell
- PraiseStreet Worship Band

== R ==
- Rachel, Rachel
- Matt Redman
- Relient K
- Chris Rice

== S ==
- Stellar Kart
- Sanctus Real
- Selah
- Sixpence None the Richer
- Michael W. Smith
- Souljahz
- Rebecca St. James
- Scott Stapp
- Pete Stewart
- Angie Stone
- Switchfoot

== T ==
- The Talleys
- tobyMac
- T-bone
- Russ Taff
- Michael Tait
- Take 6
- Tedd T
- Third Day
- Chris Tomlin
- Randy Travis
- Kathy Troccoli

== U ==
- Carrie Underwood

== V ==
- VeggieTales
- Jaci Velasquez
- Phil Vischer
- Virtue

== W ==
- Matthew Ward
- Wayne Watson
- Gregg Wattenberg
- Whitecross
- BeBe Winans
- CeCe Winans
- World Wide Message Tribe
- Paul Wright

== Z ==
- ZOEgirl
