= Brave Heart (Kim Hill album) =

Studio album by Kim Hill
- Released: 1991
- Studios: Quad Studios, Home Groan Studio and OmniSound Studios (Nashville, Tennessee)
- Genre: Contemporary Christian music
- Length: 41:32
- Label: Reunion
- Producers: Brown Bannister; Wayne Kirkpatrick

Professional ratings
Review scores
Source	Rating
AllMusic	2.5/5 stars

Brave Heart is the third studio album by Kim Hill, released in 1991. It earned a Grammy nomination for Best Rock/Contemporary Gospel Album. It reached number 11 on the Contemporary Christian Albums chart in Billboard Magazine.

== Track listing ==
1. "Words" (Kim Hill, Gordon Kennedy, Wayne Kirkpatrick) – 3:25
2. "Satisfied" (Kirkpatrick) – 4:47
3. "Up in the Sky" (Kennedy, Kirkpatrick) – 2:40
4. "Mysterious Ways" (Kirkpatrick) – 5:37
5. "Round and Round" (Hill, Kirkpatrick) – 3:37
6. "Stop My Heart" (Hill, Kirkpatrick, Chris McHugh, Tommy Sims) – 6:10
7. "She'll Come Around" (Kennedy, Kirkpatrick) – 3:37
8. "Don't Face the World Alone" (Karen Peris) – 4:15
9. "In My Life" (Hill, Kirkpatrick, Sims, Bob Farrell) – 4:55
10. "I Will Wait" (Hill, Kirkpatrick, Sims) – 2:36

== Personnel ==
Musicians

- Kim Hill – vocals
- Carl Marsh – Fairlight strings (1, 3, 6), Fairlight brass (1), keyboards (8)
- Blair Masters – keyboards (1, 6), E-mu Emulator III (1–9), Fender Rhodes (4)
- Phil Madeira – Hammond B3 organ (1, 3–5, 10)
- Wayne Kirkpatrick – acoustic guitar (1–5, 7, 9, 10), backing vocals (1, 4, 6–8), hi-string guitar (6, 10)
- Gordon Kennedy – acoustic guitar (1, 6, 7), electric guitar (1–9), talk box (1), hi-string guitar (3, 8–10), dobro (7), double-neck guitar (7), slide guitar solo (7)
- Jerry McPherson – electric guitar (2, 4, 5, 7, 8), hi-string guitar (3), electric 12-string guitar (5), acoustic guitar (10)
- Tommy Sims – bass (1–9), acoustic guitar (9, 10)
- Chris McHugh – drums (1–9)
- Terry McMillan – percussion (4), tambourine (5), shaker (7, 9), sleigh bells (8)
- John Hammond – drum programming (7)
- Chris Harris – backing vocals (1, 2, 4, 6–8)
- Mark Heimmerman – backing vocals (1, 2, 6, 7)
- Lisa Bevill – backing vocals (2)
- Chris Rodriguez – backing vocals (8)

Music arrangements on "Round and Round"

- Wes King
- Wayne Kirkpatrick
- Blair Masters
- Chris McHugh
- Jerry McPherson
- Tommy Sims

Production

- Richard Headen – executive producer
- Brown Bannister – producer, overdub engineer
- Wayne Kirkpatrick – producer
- Jeff Balding – recording, mixing
- Steve Bishir – recording assistant, overdub engineer
- Bill Whittington – overdub engineer
- Patrick Kelly – mix assistant
- Doug Sax – mastering at The Mastering Lab (Hollywood, California)
- Traci Sterling – production coordinator
- Buddy Jackson – art direction
- D.L. Rhodes – art direction
- Beth Middleworth – design
- Mark Tucker – photography
