= Mark Robertson (bassist) =

American musician and record producer

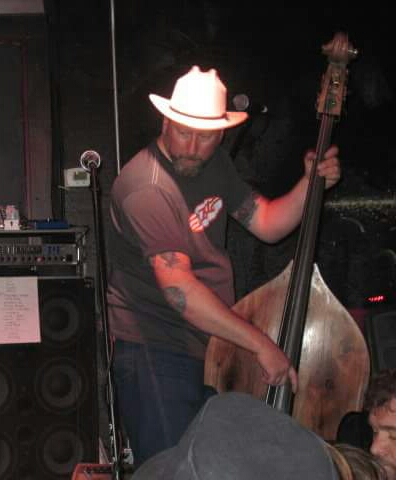
- Robertson performing with Legendary Shack Shakers in 2010

Background information
- Also known as: The Duke
- Genres: Rockabilly; blues; country
- Occupations: Musician, record producer
- Instruments: Upright bass, bass guitar, guitar

Mark Robertson is an American musician and record producer. Robertson is most well known for being a member of Rich Mullins' backing band, A Raggamuffin Band, the frontman of This Train, and bass player and producer of Legendary Shack Shakers. He has also played bass for Brighton, Altar Boys, Flesh Vehicle (founded by Tom Pappas of Superdrag), JD Wilkes & The Dirt Daubers, The Dixiecrats (alongside Shack Shaker J.D. Wilkes and members of Los Straitjackets), The Eskimo Brothers, Derek Hoke, and his newest band Prayer Flags, in which he is the frontman. His primary instrument is upright and electric bass, though he has performed lead and backing vocals for notable projects, including Rich Mullins' final album The Jesus Record and This Train. He co-produced Rich Mullins' Canticle of the Plains album, Mitch McVicker's first solo recording, Without Looking Down, as well as albums by This Train and The Legendary Shack Shakers.
