= Awesome God =

1988 contemporary worship song by Rich Mullins

Single by Rich Mullins

from the album Winds of Heaven, Stuff of Earth
- Genre: Contemporary worship
- Length: 3:05
- Label: Reunion
- Songwriter: Rich Mullins
- Producer: Reed Arvin

"Awesome God" is a contemporary worship song written by Rich Mullins and first recorded on his 1988 album, Winds of Heaven, Stuff of Earth. It was the first single from the album and rose to the number one spot on Christian AC radio and subsequently became a popular congregational song. Its title is inspired by a biblical expression (Nehemiah 1:5, Nehemiah 9:32, Psalm 47, Daniel 9:4, etc.), variously translated as "Awesome God", (JPS, in the old-fashioned meaning "awe-inspiring"), "great" (KJV), among other alternatives. Due to the popularity of the song, it became Mullins' signature song. It was also used in the 2021 Netflix movie A Week Away.

== Commentary ==
Mullins did not consider the song to be one of his best. In an interview with The Lighthouse Electronic Magazine in April 1996, he said:

You know, the thing I like about Awesome God is that it's one of the worst-written songs that I ever wrote; it's just poorly crafted. But the thing is that sometimes, I think, that when you become too conscientious about being a songwriter, the message becomes a vehicle for the medium. This is a temptation that I think all songwriters have. I think a great songwriter is someone who is able to take a very meaningful piece of wisdom — or of folly or whatever — and say it in a way that is most likely to make people respond. But, what you want them to respond to is not how cleverly you did that; what you want them to respond to is your message.

== Accolades ==
Year	Organization	Category	Result	Ref.
1990	GMA Dove Awards	Song of the Year	Nominated	
1991	GMA Dove Awards	Song of the Year	Nominated	

== Charts ==
Weekly chart performance for "Awesome God"
Chart (1988)	Peak position
US Christian Adult Contemporary (CCM Magazine)	1
US Christian CHR (CCM Magazine)	3
US Christian Inspirational (CCM Magazine)	4

== Cover versions ==
Over a year after Mullins' death (in September 1997), the song was covered on a tribute album for Mullins entitled Awesome God: A Tribute to Rich Mullins by fellow Contemporary Christian musician, Michael W. Smith. Numerous other Christian artists have performed versions in numerous styles, from ska to swing to rock and traditional worship style, even hardcore punk and heavy metal by the bands Unashamed and Pantokrator.

== Phil Wickham version ==
"What an Awesome God"

Single by Phil Wickham

from the album Song of the Saints
- Released: April 11, 2025
- Length: 3:32
- Label: Fair Trade/Columbia
- Songwriters: Wickham; Jonathan Smith; Rich Mullins
- Producer: Smith

Phil Wickham singles chronology
"The King Is in the Room" (2025)	"What an Awesome God" (2025)	"Homesick for Heaven" (2025)

On April 11, 2025, Phil Wickham released an updated remake of the song, titled "What an Awesome God". It appeared on his album Song of the Saints. The song became his first Billboard Hot 100 entry and topped Billboard's Christian Airplay and AC Airplay charts.

=== Accolades ===
Year	Organization	Category	Result	Ref.
2025	We Love Awards	Worship Song of the Year	Nominated	
2026	K-Love Fan Awards	Song of the Year	Nominated	
2026	Dove Awards	Song of the Year	Nominated	
2026	Dove Awards	Worship Recorded Song of the Year	Nominated	
2026	ASCAP Awards	Most Performed Christian Songs	Honored	

Year-end lists
Publication	Accolade	Rank	Ref.
K-Love	25 Songs That Defined 2025	Unordered	
Air1	Air1 Unwrapped 2025	1	

=== Charts ===
==== Weekly charts ====
Weekly chart performance for "What an Awesome God"
Chart (2025–2026)	Peak position
UK Singles Downloads Chart (OCC)	80
US Billboard Hot 100	86
US Hot Christian Songs (Billboard)	2
US Christian Airplay (Billboard)	1

==== Year-end charts ====
Year-end chart performance for "What an Awesome God"
Chart (2025)	Position
US Hot Christian Songs (Billboard)	5
US Christian Airplay (Billboard)	9
US Christian Adult Contemporary (Billboard)	13
