= Do It Right =

Do It Right may refer to:

- Do It Right (album), by SHINEmk
- "Do It Right" (Martin Solveig song), a 2016 single
- "Do It Right" (Anne-Marie song), a 2015 single by Anne-Marie

== See also ==
- Doing It Right (scuba diving)
