= Michael Card =

American singer

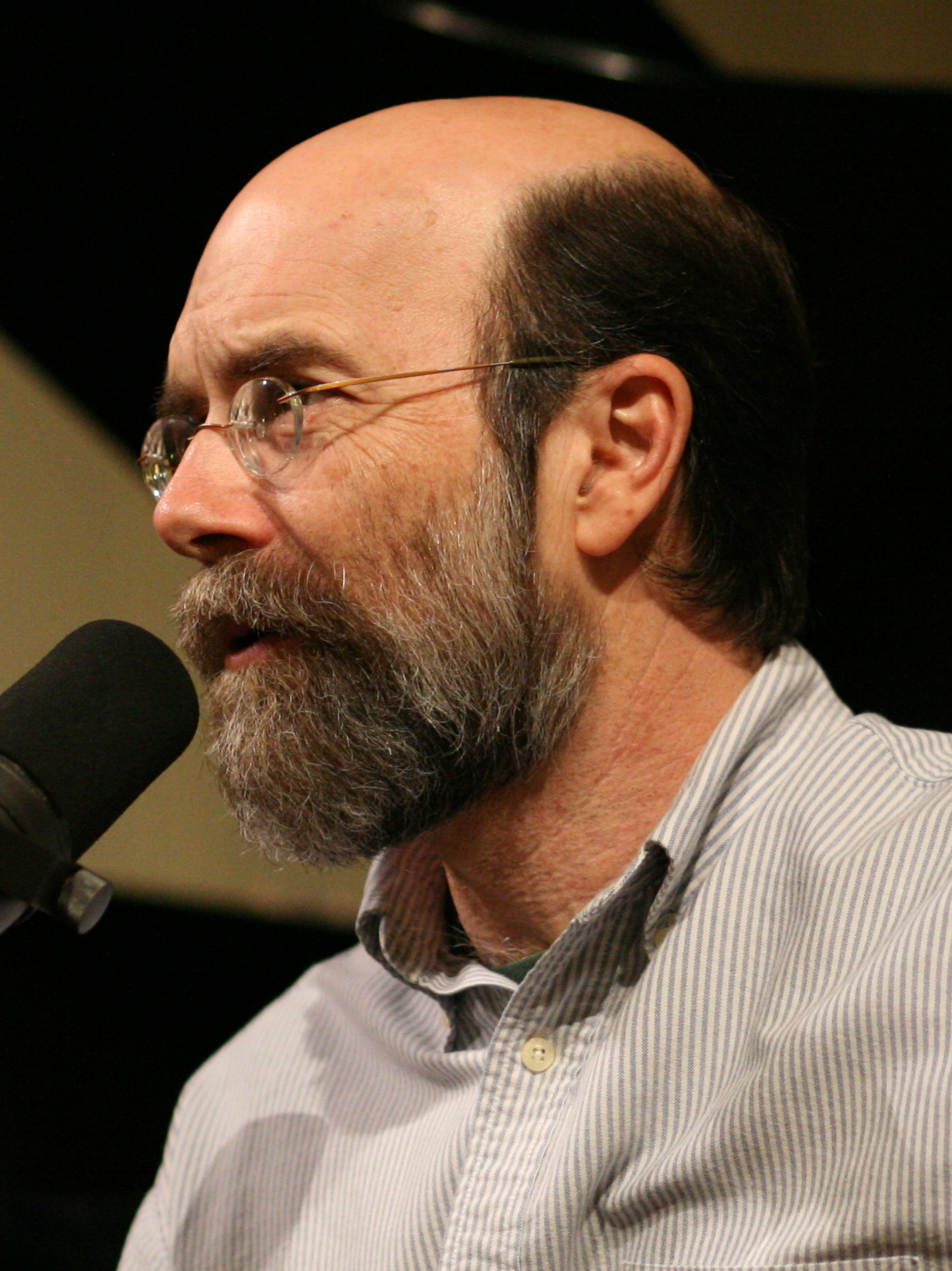
- Michael Card in concert

Background information
- Born: Michael Card; April 11, 1957 (age 69)
- Origin: Madison, Tennessee
- Genre: Contemporary Christian music
- Occupations: Singer, songwriter, author, composer, radio host
- Instruments: Vocals, piano, guitar
- Years active: 1981–present
- Labels: Milk & Honey, Sparrow, Myrrh
- Website: michaelcard.com

Michael Card (born April 11, 1957) is an American Christian singer-songwriter, musician, author, and radio host from Franklin, Tennessee. He is best known for his contributions in contemporary Christian music, which combine folk-style melodies and instrumentation with an in-depth study of the Bible. Since his debut in 1981, Card has sold more than 4 million albums and has written 19 No. 1 singles. He has also authored several books, including the Gold Medallion Book Award winner A Sacred Sorrow.

== Career ==
Card was born in Madison, Tennessee. He is the son of a doctor and the grandson of a Baptist minister. He received bachelor's and master's degrees in biblical studies from Western Kentucky University, and was awarded the university's Distinguished Alumni Award in 1997. His studies in physics and astronomy led to a job at a planetarium, allowing him to fund his education. In 2005, Card worked on a Doctor of Philosophy (PhD) degree in Classical literature.

=== Musician ===
Card received his start as a professional musician when his professor and mentor, William L. Lane, asked him to write some music to accompany weekly sermons at their church. Card's friend and fellow musician, Randy Scruggs, then requested that Card record a demo tape to help Scruggs get a job as a producer. The record label agreed to hire Scruggs as long as his first project featured Card. Since then, Card has released thirty-two original albums and six compilation albums. His Starkindler project is composed of his interpretations of traditional Celtic hymns. The compilations often include one or two new songs along with previously released material. With the exception of Starkindler and Hymns, Card writes a vast majority of the music he records.

Many of Card's albums are structured around a unifying theme. The songs from The Beginning are all based on the Pentateuch. The individual songs have subjects such as Genesis, Leviticus, Abraham, Isaac, and Moses. He is particularly adept at relating difficult or obscure concepts from the Old Testament to more understandable themes from the New Testament. The song "Jubilee" concerns the period of rest and the release from debts and slavery commanded in the Jubilee year as described in Leviticus 25, but also relates to the rest and freedom from condemnation offered through Jesus.

Card's most famous song is "El Shaddai", which was also recorded by Amy Grant. Grant's recording was named No. 326 on the RIAA's list of 365 Songs of the Century in 2001. Other popular Card songs include "Immanuel", "Joy in the Journey", and "Heal Our Land", which was commissioned as the 1993 National Day of Prayer's theme song.

Despite his success in music, Card has always maintained that his music career is secondary to his calling as a Bible teacher. He has distanced himself from the Christian music industry by criticizing the promotion of personalities over musical content and the shifting emphasis away from God to sell more albums.

In 2008, alongside the By/For Project, Card produced and contributed vocals and songs to the album Sweet Sacrifice, collaborating with Seattle, Washington-based artists Brian Moss, Molly McCue, and Kurt Dyrhsen. The album was made available for free on ByFor.org under a Creative Commons Attribution license.

In 2019, Card released the album, To the Kindness of God, featuring seven new original songs, two hymn covers, and a new arrangement of one of Card's earlier songs, "Song of Gomer" (here renamed "Gomer's Song"), which first appeared on the album The Word: Recapturing the Imagination. Prior to its release, Card announced that it would be his final full-length album, but also clarifying that he was not yet retiring from music in general, or writing new music.

=== Author ===
Michael Card is the author or co-author of twenty-two books. He originally started writing as a way to share the knowledge he accumulated while researching his songs. He found his studies were too in-depth to condense everything he had learned into one short piece. The books that resulted from album research bear the same titles as the albums. He then branched out to other subjects not specifically based on his music, such as the Gospel of John, homeschooling, and Christian discipleship and mentoring. In 2014, Card completed the Biblical Imagination Series, a four-volume set which takes a deeper look at each of the gospels and the voice of the writers behind them. He followed up on the Biblical Imagination Series next by releasing a new book (and album) on the subject of the Hebrew word חֶסֶד (ḥesed), an idea which he first explored in his two books on lament (A Sacred Sorrow and The Hidden Face of God). The book is about the bibliography of the word throughout the Old Testament, and how we can start to understand this word that is so often used to describe God and cannot be precisely expressed in the English language by the context in which it is used. The book was called Inexpressible: Hesed and the Mystery of God's Lovingkindness, and was released at the end of 2019.

=== Radio host ===
In addition to touring and writing, Card also hosted a weekly radio program, In the Studio with Michael Card. It was carried by stations in 48 states, Canada, and the Caribbean. It was also available via Internet streaming audio and as a podcast. The show was an amalgam of talk, musical performances, and Bible study. The show ceased production in March 2009 but was then revived in the form of a podcast on June 18, 2018, with a mix of completely new and classic material.

== Controversies ==
In 1996, Michael Card caused some concern within his primarily evangelical fan-base by co-releasing an album (Brother to Brother) as well as touring with musician John Michael Talbot. Some fans and critics felt betrayed by the collaboration since Card is known for lyrics that scrupulously adhere to Protestant theology whereas Talbot is Catholic.

On November 14, 2004, Card provided the music for a sermon by Ravi Zacharias at the Church of Jesus Christ of Latter-day Saints' Tabernacle in Salt Lake City, Utah. In coverage of the event, a Deseret Morning News reporter wrote the following:

Still, Card said, he doesn't see Mormonism and evangelical Christianity as opposed to each other. They are more like the two ends of a long thread—part of the same thing.

Since the statement was not a direct quote, some have surmised that Card was misunderstood, which turned out to be accurate. The impact of this statement can be understood in the context that many Protestants and Catholics categorize Mormons as outside Christianity and consider the LDS church a cult.

Card's response to his critics online did satisfy some, since it denied the quote and the LDS interviewer later admitted to rewording Card's statement somewhat interpretively:

The word Michael used was "continuum". He said that he thought the tensions between the LDS Church and the Evangelicals was because the LDS Church was on one end of the "continuum" and Evangelicals on the other.

== Discography/writings ==
- First Light (1981)
- Legacy (1983)
- Known by the Scars [The Life of Christ Trilogy - Vol 1] (1984)
- Scandalon [The Life of Christ Trilogy - Vol 2] (1985)
- The Final Word [The Life of Christ Trilogy - Vol 3] (1987)
- Present Reality (1988)
- Sleep Sound in Jesus: Gentle Lullabies (1989)
- The Beginning [The Ancient Faith Trilogy - Vol 1] (1989)
- The Way of Wisdom [The Ancient Faith Trilogy - Vol 2] (1990)
- The Promise: A Celebration of Christ's Birth (1991)
- The Word: Recapturing the Imagination [The Ancient Faith Trilogy - Vol 3] (1992)
- Come to the Cradle (1993)
- Poiema (1994)
- Brother to Brother (with John Michael Talbot) (1996)
- Close Your Eyes So You Can See (1996)
- Unveiled Hope (1997)
- Starkindler: A Celtic Conversation Across Time (1998)
- Concert Talks Volume 1 (1998)
- Soul Anchor (2000)
- Scribbling in the Sand (2002)
- A Fragile Stone (2003) reissued in 2006.
- The Rabbi's Heartbeat (2003) CD single available only with Brennan Manning's The Rabbi's Heartbeat book.
- The Life of Simon Peter (eight-disc teaching series) (2003)
- The Hidden Face of God (2006)
- A Fragile Stone (Reissue) (2006) Comes with DVD of a four-part program Michael Card did with Day of Discovery on Simon Peter.
- Hymns (2008)
- Luke: A World Turned Upside Down (2011)
- Mark: The Beginning of the Gospel (2012)
- A Violent Grace (2013)
- Matthew: The Penultimate Question (2013)
- John: The Misunderstood Messiah (2014)
- To the Kindness of God (2019)

=== Compilations ===
- Legacy and First Light (1988) both albums reissued on a single disc.
- The Life (1988) contains The Final Word, Scandalon and Known by the Scars in a boxed-set (except "Crown Him (Reprise)")
- The Early Works (1991)
- The Ancient Faith (1993) contains The Beginning, The Way of Wisdom and The Word: Recapturing the Imagination in a boxed-set (plus "Heal Our Land" song for the National Day of Prayer & "Ancient Faith Overture")
- Joy in the Journey (1994) contains "Chorus selections from The Life trilogy
- Signature Songs (1999) contains selections from Legacy and First Light
- The Ultimate Collection (2006)
- An Invitation to Awe (2011) contains 24 remastered selections from The Ancient Faith

=== Other works featuring Michael Card ===
- Christmas (1988) Michael Card sings "What Child Is This?". Not available elsewhere.
- Coram Deo (1992) Michael Card sings two duets with Charlie Peacock: "Amen! Praise and Glory!" and "Lord of Love".
- Steve Green People Need the Lord (1994) Duet on "Embrace the Cross".
- Promise Keepers- A Life That Shows (1994) Song "Bearers of the Light", later available on Poiema, debuts here.
- Wedding album (1995) Michael Card's "Earthly Perfect Harmony" and "Lord of Love", a duet with Charlie Peacock appear.
- Wes King A Room Full of Stories (1997) Wrote "Who But God?"
- Songs 4 Life: Feel the Power (1998) "Love Crucified Arose"
- Songs 4 life: Renew your heart! (1998) "Joy In The Journey"
- John Michael Talbot "Cave Of The Heart" (1999) Backing vocals.
- 30 Years of Award-Winning Music (1999) "El Shaddai"
- Songs From The Book (1999) "The Book" appears. Michael Card also plays acoustic guitar on "El Shaddai" sung by Winans Phase 2 & Amy Grant.
- John Michael Talbot Wisdom (2001) Backing vocals.
- I Will Be Here: 10 Contemporary Wedding Songs includes "The Wedding"
- Giving You the Rest of My Life: 13 Contemporary Classics for Memorable Weddings Michael Card & Charlie Peacock's "Amen! Praise and Glory" are included, but Charlie Peacock isn't credited as singing.
- Let Us Pray: The National Day of Prayer Album "Heal Our Land"
- My Cry Ascends: New Parish Psalms (2010) (various artists, Gregory Wilbur, composer)

=== Videos ===
- Front Row (1990)
- The Word: Recapturing The Imagination (1992) Includes music video "So Many Books".
- The Visual Bible: The Debate Over Tradition (1994) Includes "Recapture Me" music video.
- Christmas In Belfast (1997)
- Scribbling In The Sand (2002) Also on DVD.

=== Books ===
- Sleep Sound in Jesus (1989) (ISBN 0-7369-1219-3)
- Immanuel: Reflections on the Life of Christ (1990) (ISBN 0-8407-7496-6)
- The Promise: A Celebration of Christ's Birth (1991) (ISBN 0-917143-07-8)
- Come to the Cradle (1993) (ISBN 0-917143-24-8)
- The Parable of Joy: Reflections on the Wisdom of the Book of John (1995) (ISBN 0-7852-8229-7)
- Close Your Eyes So You Can See: Stories of Children in the Life of Jesus (1996) (ISBN 1-56507-425-4)
- Joy in the Journey (1996) (ISBN 0-7935-7665-2)
- The Homeschool Journey (with Susan Card) (1997) (ISBN 1-56507-568-4)
- Unveiled Hope: Eternal Encouragement from the Book of Revelation (with Scotty Smith) (1997) (ISBN 0-7852-7209-7)
- Tell Me Why: Eternal Answers to Life's Timeless Questions (1999) (ISBN 1-58134-031-1) – Answers to children's questions such as "Why did God make me?" and "Why do we have to die?"
- A Violent Grace (2000) (ISBN 1-57673-688-1) – Focuses on the frequently ignored brutality of Jesus' crucifixion.
- The Walk: A Moment in Time When Two Lives Intersect (2001) (ISBN 0-7852-7750-1) – Chronicles the 20-year relationship between Card and his mentor, Dr. William Lane, until Lane's death.
- Scribbling in the Sand: Christ and Creativity (2002) (ISBN 0-8308-2317-4)
- Scribbling in the Sand Audio Book (2002)
- A Fragile Stone: the Emotional Life of Simon Peter (2003) (ISBN 0-8308-2372-7)
- A Fragile Stone Audio Book (2003)
- A Sacred Sorrow: Reaching Out to God in The Lost Language of Lament (2005) (ISBN 1-57683-667-3) – Reclaiming the ability to cry out to God when we suffer.
- A Sacred Sorrow Experience Guide (2005) (ISBN 1-57683-668-1) – A 10-week study that helps the reader relate his own painful experiences to those of Biblical personages.
- The Hidden Face of God: Finding the Missing Door to the Father Through Lament (2007) (ISBN 1-57683-669-X)
- A Better Freedom: Finding Life as Slaves of Christ (InterVarsity Press, 2009) (ISBN 0-8308-3714-0)
- A Violent Grace: Meeting Christ at the Cross (InterVarsity Press, 2013) (ISBN 0-83083-772-8)
- Luke: The Gospel of Amazement (InterVarsity Press, 2011) (ISBN 0-8308-3835-X)
- Mark: The Gospel of Passion (InterVarsity Press, 2012) (ISBN 0-8308-3813-9)
- Matthew: The Gospel of Identity (InterVarsity Press, 2013) (ISBN 0-8308-3812-0)
- John: The Gospel of Wisdom (InterVarsity Press, 2014) (ISBN 0-8308-4413-9)
- Inexpressible: Hesed and the Mystery of God's Lovingkindness (InterVarsity Press, 2018) (ISBN 0-8308-4549-6)
- The Nazarene: Forty Devotions on the Lyrical Life of Jesus (InterVarsity Press, 2020) (ISBN 0-8308-4801-0)

== Awards ==
Year	Award	Work	Recognition
1983	GMA Dove Awards	El Shaddai	Songwriter of the Year; Song of the Year
1988	GMA Dove Awards	The Final Word	Praise & Worship Album of the Year
1994	GMA Dove Awards	Come to the Cradle	Children's Music Album of the Year
1994	RIAA Certified Gold Recording	Sleep Sound in Jesus	
1997	Western Kentucky University		Distinguished Alumnus
1998	National Religious Broadcasters		Chairman's Award
2001	RIAA 365	No. 26 El Shaddai, as recorded by Amy Grant	Songs of the Century
2002	Publishers Weekly Award	Scribbling in the Sand	Best Religion Book
2002	Chicago Book Clinic Award of Excellence	Scribbling in the Sand	Best General Trade Book in the Self-Help Category
2006	ECPA Christian Book Awards	A Sacred Sorrow	Winner in the Christian Life Category

== Singles ==
Album	Song	Year	Position
First Light	"I Have Decided"	1982	8
	"Fan the Flame"	1982	16
	"Jesus Loves Me (This I Know)"	1982	8
Legacy	"Love Crucified Arose"	1983	5
	"Abba Father"	1983	4
	"Tell the World that Jesus Loves You"	1983	32
	"This Must be The Lamb"	1984	14
Known by the Scars	"Known by the Scars"	1985	14
Scandalon	"Scandalon"	1986	3
The Final Word	"The Final Word"	1987	11
	"Celebrate the Child"	1987	14
	"To the Mystery"	1988	10
Present Reality	"That's What Faith Must Be"	1988	14
	"Know You in the Now"	1988	6
The Beginning	"Jubilee"	1990	7
	"Lift up the Suffering Symbol"	1990	23
The Way of Wisdom	"The Way of Wisdom"	1991	15
	"How Long"	1991	14
The Promise: A Celebration of Christ's Birth	"We Will Find Him"	1992	16
