= Here in America =

Compilation album by Rich Mullins
- Released: May 6, 2003
- Genre: Contemporary Christian music
- Length: 66:06
- Label: Reunion
- Producer: Steve Cudworth / Fred Paragono

Rich Mullins chronology
Songs 2 (1999)	Here in America (2003)

Here in America is a CD compilation of early songwriting demos and rare live recordings of concert performances given by American singer-songwriter Rich Mullins as he toured across America in 1987 with song collaborator Steve Cudworth (vocals/guitar) and Kyle Stevens (drums/vocals). Released posthumously on May 6, 2003, six years after his death, "Here in America" allows listeners to enjoy excerpts from Rich Mullins concerts prior to the release of "Awesome God" in 1988, which inevitably propelled him, as a recording artist, to a higher level of recognition by the CCM industry. The album comes with a Bonus DVD with two parts – "Live at Studio B", a 1997 concert with a Ragamuffin Band; and "12 Short Stories", which was recorded in February 1994 (although the DVD misidentifies it as 1993) during a two-day seminar led by Rich Mullins and Beaker at Family Broadcasting Corporation in South Bend, Indiana. Several segments of footage left off the release were made available publicly in 2018 on YouTube due to the efforts of a Mullins fan online petition the previous year.

== CD track listing ==
1. "Here in America" (Songwriting Demo)
2. "Teaching Awesome God" (Live)
3. "Verge of a Miracle" (Live)
4. "Be With You" (Live)
5. "O Come All Ye Faithful" (Songwriting Demo)
6. "What Trouble Are Giants" (Live)
7. "Praise Ye The Lord" (Live)
8. "Hello Old Friends" (Live)
9. "It Don't Do" (Live)
10. "Screen Door" (Live)
11. "Never Heard The Music" (Songwriting Demo)
12. "None Are Stronger" (Live)
13. "The Lord's Prayer" (Songwriting Demo)
14. "Making it Rain" (Hidden Track #1) [Deluxe Edition]
15. "Storytime with Rich" (Hidden Track #2) [Deluxe Edition]
16. "Rich on Christian Entertainment" (Bonus Track) [Deluxe Edition]
17. "Rich on the weirdest Bible character" (Bonus Track) [Deluxe Edition]
18. "Awesome God [Studio version w/Intro]" (Bonus Track) [Deluxe Edition]
19. "Awesome God [Live version w/Intro]" (Bonus Track) [Deluxe Edition]
20. "Elijah" (Live) (Bonus Track) [Deluxe Edition]

== DVD track listing ==
Live From Studio B:

1. I Will Sing
2. Sing Your Praise to the Lord
3. If I Stand
4. Calling Out Your Name
5. Elijah
6. Awesome God
7. We Are Not As Strong as We Think We Are
8. Let Mercy Lead
9. Boy Like Me – Man Like You
10. F Major Invention (J.S. Bach)
11. Screen Door
12. Hold Me Jesus
13. Sometimes By Step
14. Creed

12 Short Stories:

1. Sex and Self-Confidence
2. Perfection Is Boring
3. Be Assertive
4. Killing Philistines
5. Sensationalism
6. Worship Buzz
7. A Reason To Party
8. Life Is Good
9. Women & Tragedy
10. I Never Intended
11. Temptation In Germany
12. Driving Without Headlights
