= Never Picture Perfect =

Studio album by Rich Mullins
- Released: December 1, 1989
- Recorded: 1989
- Studio: OmniSound Recording Studios and Digital Recorders (Nashville, Tennessee); Big Dog Studio (Wichita, Kansas); The Pond (Franklin, Tennessee)
- Genre: Contemporary Christian music
- Length: 37:27
- Label: Reunion
- Producer: Reed Arvin

Rich Mullins chronology
Winds of Heaven, Stuff of Earth (1988)	Never Picture Perfect (1989)	The World as Best as I Remember It (1991-1992)

Never Picture Perfect is the fourth solo album by songwriter Rich Mullins and was released in 1989 on Reunion Records.

== Track listing ==
All songs written by Rich Mullins.

=== Side one ===
1. "I Will Sing" – 1:27
2. "Hope To Carry On" – 2:33
3. "While The Nations Rage" – 4:50
4. "First Family" – 3:06
5. "Alrightokuhhuhamen" – 4:12

=== Side two ===
1. "Higher Education and The Book of Love" – 5:47
2. "Bound to Come Some Trouble" – 3:41
3. "The Love of God" – 2:48
4. "My One Thing" – 3:42
5. "Somewhere" – 4:32
6. "The Love of God (Reprise)" – 0:49

Professional ratings
Review scores
Source	Rating
Jesus Freak Hideout	4.5/5 stars

== Personnel ==
- Rich Mullins – lead vocals, acoustic piano (4, 7, 8), hammered dulcimer (9)
- Reed Arvin – keyboards (2, 3, 5, 6, 9, 10), Synclavier (3, 5, 6, 9, 10), string arrangements
- Jerry McPherson – guitars (2–6, 9, 10), mandolin (10)
- Mark O'Connor – mandolin (4), fiddle (4)
- Tom Hemby – guitar solo (9)
- Jimmie Lee Sloas – bass (2, 3, 5, 6, 9, 10)
- Danny O'Lannerghty – bass (4)
- Paul Leim – drums (2, 3, 5, 6, 9, 10)
- Bill Sinclair – harmonica (5, 9)
- Ed Calle – saxophone (6)
- Kristin Wilkinson – string contractor
- Ashley Cleveland – featured vocals (1)
- Pam Tillis – featured vocals (1)
- Richard Gibson – backing vocals (1)
- Donny Monk – backing vocals (1)
- Guy Penrod – backing vocals (1)
- Jon Sherberg – backing vocals (1)
- Gary Smith – backing vocals (1)
- Chris Rodriguez – backing vocals (2, 6)
- Bonnie Keen – backing vocals (5, 9)
- Marabeth Jordan – backing vocals (5, 9)
- Marty McCall – backing vocals (5, 9)
- Margaret Becker – backing vocals (6)

== Production ==
- Michael Blanton – executive producer
- Terry Hemmings – executive producer
- Reed Arvin – producer
- Bill Deaton – engineer, mixing
- Brent King – additional engineer
- Hank Williams – mastering at MasterMix (Nashville, Tennessee)
- D.L. Rhodes – cover coordinator
- Jackson Design – art direction, design
- Mark Tucker – photography
