= The Jesus Record =

Studio album by Rich Mullins
- Released: July 21, 1998
- Recorded: 1997–1998
- Studio: Ragamuffin Recorders, Brentwood, Tennessee; The White House, The Carport and Sound Stage Studios (Nashville, Tennessee); Dark Horse Recording Studio (Franklin, Tennessee); Abbey Road Studios (London, England)
- Genre: CCM
- Length: 78:36
- Label: Myrrh
- Producer: Rick Elias

Rich Mullins chronology
Songs (1996)	The Jesus Record (1998)

The Jesus Record is the ninth and final album by American singer and songwriter Rich Mullins, released posthumously on July 21, 1998, ten months after his death.

The first disc of the album, entitled "The Jesus Demos", consists of nine rough demos Mullins recorded for the album in an abandoned church on September 10, 1997, nine days before his death. The songs were meant for a concept album based on the life of Jesus Christ, to be called Ten Songs About Jesus.

The second disc was recorded after Mullins' death by a Ragamuffin Band (Rick Elias, Mark Robertson, Jimmy Abegg and Aaron Smith), with guest vocals by Amy Grant, Michael W. Smith, Ashley Cleveland, and Phil Keaggy. Orchestration for the album, arranged and conducted by Tom Howard, were recorded at London's Abbey Road Studios. The album ends with the rough demo version of "That Where I Am, There You...", with added instruments and vocals by the Ragamuffin Band, Michael W. Smith and a large choir of family and friends. The last thing heard on the album are the faint sounds of "Nothing But the Blood of Jesus", played by Mullins on the Hammered Dulcimer. The recording, which was made during a 1997 concert performance in Green Bay, Wisconsin, barely made it onto the final album. Two men, who were helping Elias find potential recordings, searched countless church video libraries, bootleg tape traders lists, professional video tapers, music message boards, email discussion lists and other sources, before someone came forward with a tape that was made at the Green Bay church. This person was able to rush the tape to the two men doing the extensive search, who then rushed it to Elias who was mastering the album. The tape arrived on the final day of mastering, just barely in time to be included.

Much of the album was performed live at the 1998 Cornerstone Music Festival by a Ragamuffin Band, who then embarked on "The Homeless Man Tour" as a tribute to Mullins' memory.

== Track listing ==
Disc One: The Jesus Demos

1. "Hard to Get" (Rich Mullins) – 4:41
2. "All The Way to Kingdom Come" (Rich Mullins) – 3:18
3. "My Deliverer" (Rich Mullins, Mitch McVicker) – 3:18
4. "Surely God Is With Us" (Mark Robertson, Beaker) – 3:48
5. "Jesus..." (Rich Mullins, Mitch McVicker, Dana Waddel) – 4:34
6. "You Did Not Have a Home" (Rich Mullins) – 2:27
7. "Heaven in His Eyes" (Rich Mullins) – 4:00
8. "Nothing Is Beyond You" (Rich Mullins, Mitch McVicker, Tom Booth) – 3:40
9. "That Where I Am, There You..." (Rich Mullins) – 2:45

Disc Two: The Jesus Record

1. "My Deliverer" – 5:59
2. "Surely God Is With Us" – 4:29
3. "Nothing Is Beyond You" – 4:19
4. "You Did Not Have a Home" – 2:57
5. "Jesus..." – 6:05
6. "All The Way to Kingdom Come" – 3:51
7. "Man of No Reputation" (Rick Elias) – 6:04
8. "Heaven In His Eyes" – 4:05
9. "Hard To Get" – 4:55
10. "That Where I Am, There You..." – 3:21

== Personnel ==
=== The Jesus Demos ===
- Rich Mullins – vocals, guitar (1, 2, 4, 6, 9) acoustic piano (3, 5, 7, 8)
- Mitch McVicker – additional guitar (9)

=== The Jesus Record ===
The Ragamuffins

- Rick Elias – guitars, lead vocals (1, 4, 6, 7, 9), backing vocals (1–4, 6–10), harmonica (4, 7)
- Jimmy Abegg – guitars, backing vocals (1, 2, 4, 6–10), lead vocals (4, 6)
- Mark Robertson – bass, backing vocals (1, 2, 4, 6–10), lead vocals (2, 4, 6)
- Aaron Smith – drums, backing vocals (1, 2, 4, 6–10)

With

- Ashley Cleveland – backing vocals (1, 9), lead vocals (5)
- Michael W. Smith – backing vocals (1, 10), lead vocals (8, 10),
- Jim Chaffee – backing vocals (2–4, 6, 8, 10)
- Amy Grant – lead vocals (3), backing vocals (9, 10)
- Linda Elias – backing vocals (3, 4, 6), percussion (6, 10)
- Phil Keaggy – lead vocals (6)
- Rich Mullins – lead vocals (10), guitars (10)

Additional musicians

- Tom Howard – acoustic piano (1, 3, 5, 7, 8), orchestrations (1, 3, 5, 7, 8), orchestra arrangements (1, 5, 7), conducting (1, 3, 5, 7, 8), string arrangements (3), Wurlitzer electric piano (8), string quartet arrangements (8)
- Phil Madeira – Hammond B3 organ (1, 2, 7–10), lap steel guitar (2), dobro (4), accordion (10)
- Tim Lauer – Mellotron (3), accordion (4, 7), harmonium (9)
- Jerry McPherson – additional guitars (3, 6, 8–10)
- Kenny Greenberg – additional guitars (6)
- Mitch McVicker – guitars (10)
- Eric Darken – percussion (1–3, 5–10)
- Sam Levine – penny whistle (1, flute (5), recorder (9)

The London Session Orchestra

- Paul Kegg – cello
- Anthony Pleeth – cello
- Frank Schaeffer – cello
- Johnathan Williams – cello
- Paul Cullington – double bass
- Chris Laurence – double bass
- Philip Dukes – viola
- Bill Hawkes – viola
- George Robertson – viola
- Caty Wilkinson – viola
- John Bradbury – violin
- Ben Cruft – violin
- Wilfred Gibson – violin
- Rebecca Hirsch – violin
- Patrick Kiernan – violin
- Boguslaw Kostecki – violin
- Jim McLeod – violin
- Perry Montague-Mason – violin
- Rolf Wilson – violin
- Gavyn Wright – violin, leader
- John Pigneguy – horn
- Frank Lloyd – horn
- Michael Thompson – horn

Children's Choir on "My Deliverer"

- Megan Dockery
- Sterling Gibson
- Brandon Hargest
- Brittany Hargest
- Ashley Melling
- Emily Webb
- Chris White
- Matthew White

Adult Choir on "My Deliverer"

- Ann Bailey
- Melinda Doolittle
- Steve Flanigan
- Nicole Coleman-Mullen
- George Pendergrass
- Scat Springs
- Roz Thompson
- Percy Travis III

Choir on "That Where I Am, There You..."

- Alexia M. Abegg
- Jemina Abegg
- Michelle Abegg
- Pierette Abegg
- Ann Bailey
- Keith Bordeaux
- Rebecca Brown
- Janice Chaffee
- Jim Chaffee
- Rose Corazza
- Laura Davis
- Lea Fulton
- Dawn Gates
- Gloria Green
- Archie Griffin
- Chuck Hargett
- Connie Hawk
- Hardy Hemphill
- Nicole Hemphill
- Jamie Kiner
- Marie Lehman
- Kurt Lightner
- Elizabeth Lutz
- Mark Lutz
- Eric May
- David McCracken
- Chuck Nelson
- Laura Neutzling
- Michael Oliver
- Mari O'Neill
- Kristin Pierson
- Mary Quick
- Aaron Smith
- Augdrey Eva Smith
- Chris Smith
- Janice Smith
- Kathryn Garcia Smith
- Sydney Maria Smith
- Roz Thompson
- Kevin Tucker
- Michelle Younkman
- Stuart Young

== Production ==
- Jim Chaffee – A&R direction, executive producer
- Judith Volz – A&R direction, executive producer
- Jamie Kiner – A&R direction
- Rick Elias – producer
- Russ Long – engineer
- Peter Cobbin – orchestra and string quartet engineer
- Jordan Richter – additional engineer
- Chris Grainger – assistant engineer
- Tim Rauter – assistant engineer
- Fred Paragano – digital editing
- Lynn Fuston – additional digital editing
- David Schober – additional digital editing
- Ted Bahas – additional digital editing
- J.R. McNeely – mixing at the Sound Kitchen (Franklin, Tennessee)
- Tim Coyle – mix assistant
- Todd Gunnerson – mix assistant
- Matt "Mat5t" Weeks – mix assistant
- Hank Williams – mastering at MasterMix (Nashville, Tennessee)
- Kristin Pierson – production coordinator
- Beth Lee – art direction, design
- Jimmy Abegg – art direction, design
- Ben Pearson – art direction, design, photography
- William Morris Agency – booking
