= The Ragamuffin Gospel =

1990 book by Brennan Manning

- Author: Brennan Manning
- Language: English
- Publication date: 1990
- Pages: 227
- ISBN: 978-0880706315

The Ragamuffin Gospel is a book about Christianity by former Franciscan priest Brennan Manning. Manning argues that Jesus' gospel was one of grace, and that efforts to earn salvation are misguided, as it is impossible. He laments that the true meaning of God's grace has been lost in society amidst a constant search to please God. Manning explains that we see God "as a small-minded bookkeeper, tallying our failures and successes on a score sheet." Citing numerous biblical references and illustrative anecdotes, Manning argues that we need only accept the freedom of God's grace and its power to change lives. Rather than attempt to earn salvation, evangelism requires only to say to another: "you, too, are loved by God in the Lord Jesus.” The book was first published in 1990.

The book title was the inspiration for Christian musical artist Rich Mullins' band name A Ragamuffin Band. It also inspired TobyMac to write "Speak Life".
