= Brother's Keeper (Rich Mullins album) =

Studio album by Rich Mullins
- Released: August 1, 1995
- Recorded: December 1994 – January 1995
- Studio: The Battery, Nashville, Tennessee; Quad Studios, Nashville, Tennessee; The Saltmine, Nashville, Tennessee
- Genre: Contemporary Christian music
- Length: 39:46
- Label: Reunion
- Producer: Rich Mullins; Jimmy Abegg; Rick Elias; Phil Madeira; Lee Lundgren; Aaron Smith

Rich Mullins chronology
A Liturgy, a Legacy, & a Ragamuffin Band (1993)	Brother's Keeper (1995)	Songs (1996)

Professional ratings
Review scores
Source	Rating
AllMusic	3/5 stars

Brother's Keeper is the eighth studio album by American singer and songwriter Rich Mullins, released in 1995. This would be the final album of all-new material released by Mullins prior to his death in 1997.

Mullins originally considered naming the album "Songs" to draw ironic contrast from the unusually long titles of his previous albums. In a 1995 radio special, Mullins commented, "It's a real in-house kind of record. We didn't hire background singers; we had the wives of the guys sing for backgrounds...It was more of a family kind of project, which for me was a real blast."

The artwork on the album cover was produced by Jimmy Abegg, a member of Mullins' band.

== Track listing ==
1. "Brothers Keeper" (Rich Mullins, Beaker) – 3:16
2. "Let Mercy Lead" (Rich Mullins, Beaker) – 4:25
3. "Hatching of a Heart" (Rich Mullins) – 4:41
4. "Promenade" (Rich Mullins) – 2:45
5. "Wounds of Love" (Rich Mullins, Beaker) – 4:38
6. "Damascus Road" (Rich Mullins, Beaker) – 3:09
7. "Eli's Song" (Rich Mullins, Lee Lundgren, Nicole Lundgren) – 3:03
8. "Cry The Name" (Rich Mullins, Beaker) – 5:53
9. "The Breaks" (Rich Mullins) – 4:05
10. "Quoting Deuteronomy to the Devil" (Rich Mullins, Beaker) – 3:50

== Personnel ==
- Rich Mullins – lead vocals, acoustic piano (3, 5), synthesizers (3), hammered dulcimer (7), door sounds (8)
- Phil Madeira – Hammond B3 organ (1, 5, 9), electric guitar (1, 2, 5, 6), backing vocals (2), accordion (4), drums (4, 7), hi-strung electric guitar (6), tambourine (6), acoustic guitar (8), keyboard harmonica (8), National guitar (10), rhythm guitar (10), slide guitar (10), hambone (10)
- Beaker – acoustic guitar (1), whistle (8)
- Rick Elias – acoustic guitar (1–4, 7–9), hi-strung acoustic guitar (1, 2, 9), electric guitar (2, 6, 8, 10)
- Jimmy Abegg – bass guitar, acoustic guitar (2, 3, 9, 10), guitar solo (2, 3), gut-string guitar (3, 7), electric guitar (4, 8), mandolin (8), National guitar (10), rhythm guitar (10), hambone (10)
- Aaron Smith – drums (1–3, 5, 6, 8–10), backing vocals (2), percussion (3), shaker (8), thunder sounds (8), rain stick (8), hambone (10)
- Lee Lundgren – shaker (1), kalimba (1), Hammond B3 organ (2, 8), accordion (3, 4, 7, 9), melodica (4), harmonica (5), acoustic guitar (6, 8), pipes (7), Lenophone (10)
- Nicki Lundgren – backing vocals (1, 2, 6, 7), harmony vocals (7)
- Linda Elias – backing vocals (2, 6, 7)
- Julie Strasser – backing vocals (2, 6, 7)

Production

- Don Donahue – A&R
- Rich Mullins – executive producer, producer
- Jimmy Abegg – producer, design, illustration
- Rick Elias – producer
- Lee Lundgren – producer
- Phil Madeira – producer
- Aaron Smith – producer
- James "JB" Baird – engineer, mixing
- Todd Robbins – assistant engineer, mix assistant
- Wade Jaynes – assistant engineer, mix assistant
- Hank Williams – mastering at MasterMix (Nashville, Tennessee)
- Rob Birkhead – art direction
- Diana Lussenden – design
- Ben Pearson – photography
