= SHINEmk =

English Christian pop group

- Origin: Milton Keynes, England
- Genre: Christian pop
- Years active: 1998–2001
- Label: Reunion
- Members: Natasha Andrews; Loretta Andrews; Hanne Pettersen; Nicki Rogers

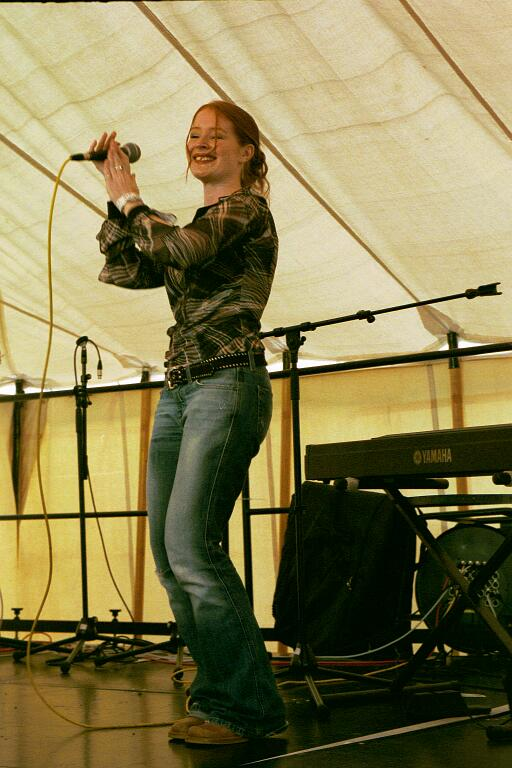
SHINEmk's Nicki Rogers in 2003

SHINEmk (also known as Shine or Shine MK) was an English Christian pop group made up of Nicki Rogers, Natasha Andrews, Loretta Andrews and Hanne Pettersen. ShineMK began in 1998 as an educational outfit touring schools in the Thames Valley area of England. They toured in the USA, where they sold over 400,000 records. SHINEmk was nominated for two Dove Awards for Do It Right. SHINEmk sang "Left Behind" with Bryan Duncan for Left Behind: The Movie.

== Disestablishment ==
The group disbanded in 2001 to pursue solo careers. Nicki Rogers went on to release two solo albums, Colour Scheme and Feeder Lane, Loretta and Natasha Andrews formed Brown:Music with Johann which recently supported Take That on the UK leg of their world tour.

== Discography ==
- Extended Play (1999)
- Do It Right (2000)
- Keep on Moving (2001)

== See also ==
- Christian girl group
