= Ashley Cleveland =

American singer-songwriter (born 1957)

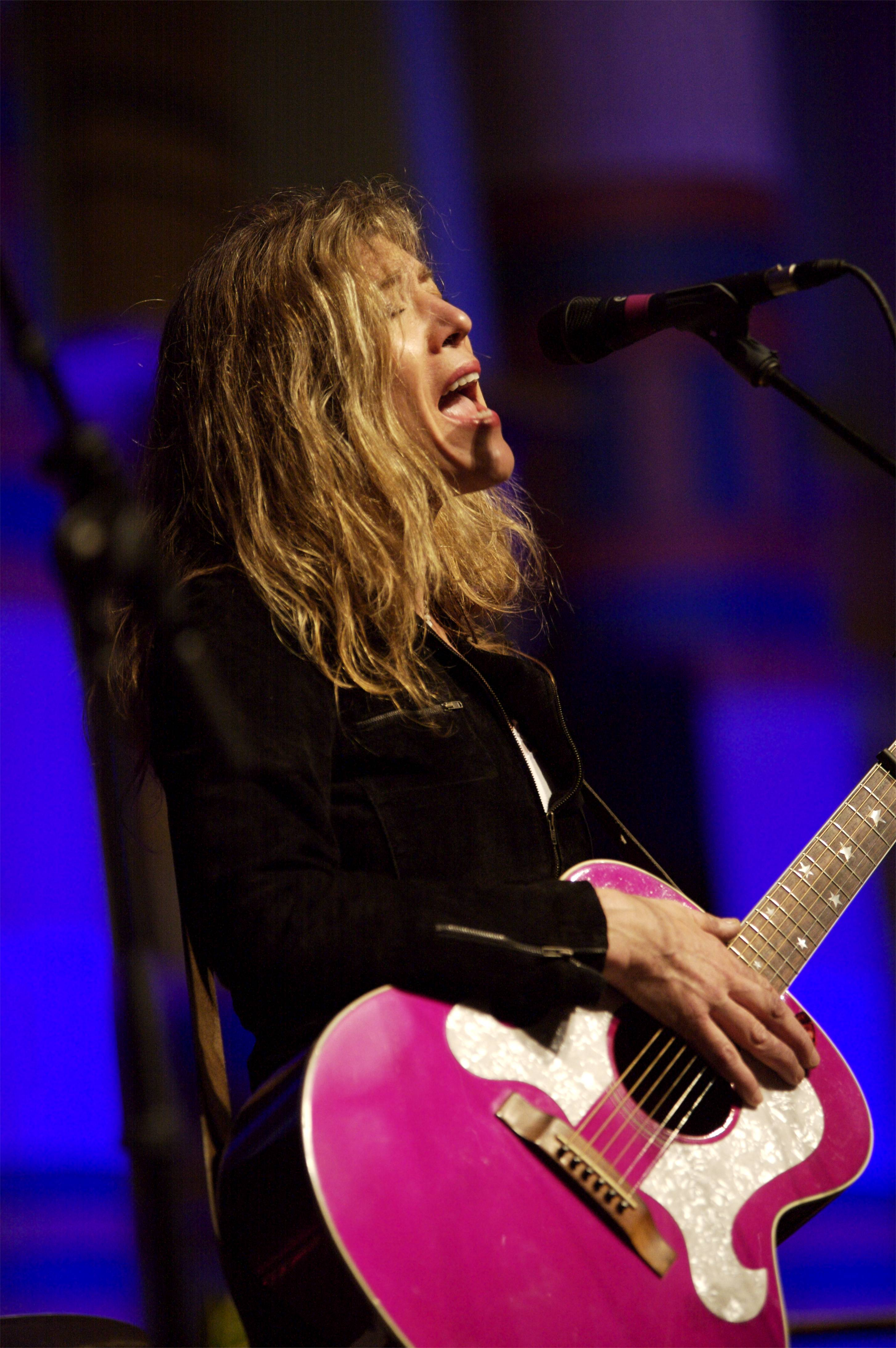
- Ashley Cleveland in 2008

Background information
- Born: Knoxville, Tennessee, U.S.
- Genres: Rock, country, Christian rock
- Occupation: Musician
- Instruments: Vocals, guitar
- Years active: 1980–present
- Website: ashleycleveland.com

Ashley Cleveland (born February 2, 1957) is an American singer-songwriter best known as a background vocalist and gospel singer. Ashley Cleveland was born in Knoxville, Tennessee.

== Career ==
She sang "We're Gonna Win This One" in 1987 for the Touchstone Pictures film Ernest Goes to Camp.

Her career includes vocal contributions to more than 300 albums, including the Dove Award winning albums Songs from the Loft (1994), The Jesus Record by Rich Mullins and A Ragamuffin Band, 1998.

As part of John Hiatt's band, she has also made several widely seen television appearances including, Austin City Limits, Late Night with David Letterman, The Arsenio Hall Show and Saturday Night Live.

Steve Winwood contributed duet vocals and played the Hammond B3 organ for the song "I Need Thee Every Hour" on Cleveland's 2005 album, Men and Angels Say.

She has contributed to the SongwritingWith:Soldiers workshops, and is credited as a co-writer on the song "Stronger Together" on the Mary Gauthier album Rifles & Rosary Beads.

== Bibliography ==
In 2013 she published her memoir, Little Black Sheep, in hardcover, & eBook format.

== Awards and recognition ==
As the Grammy Award's first female nominee in the Best Rock Gospel Album category, Ashley Cleveland won this award in 1996 for her album Lesson of Love, in 1999 for You Are There, and in 2008 for Before the Daylight's Shot. She is the only artist to be nominated, and win, three times in this category.

In 2010, God Don't Never Change, was nominated for a Grammy Award in the Best Traditional Gospel Album category, bringing her total number of overall nominations to four (with three wins).

Lesson of Love also won a 1996 Nashville Music Award ("Nammy") for Best Contemporary Christian Album.

Cleveland was the only female vocalist to sing lead on a song ("Gimme Shelter") for the television special, Stone Country: A Tribute to the Rolling Stones on the defunct The Nashville Network (TNN).

== Discography ==
Albums

- Big Town (Atlantic) (1991)
- Bus Named Desire (Reunion) (1993)
- Lesson of Love (Reunion) (1995)
- You Are There (Warner) (1998)
- Second Skin (204 Records) (2002)
- Men and Angels Say (Rambler Records) (2005)
- Before the Daylight's Shot (204 Records) (2006)
- God Don't Never Change (E1 Music) (2009). The album includes the songs:
  - "Denomination Blues"
  - "God Don't Never Change"
- Beauty in the Curve (2012)
- One More Song (2018)

Appearances

- Strong Hand of Love, tribute to Mark Heard, 1994 - Song: "It's Not Your Fault"
- Orphans of God, tribute to Mark Heard, 1996 - Song: "It's Not Your Fault"
- Awesome God: A Tribute to Rich Mullins, 1998 - Song "I See You"
- The Jesus Record, Rich Mullins & A Ragamuffin Band, 1998 ‐ Song: "Jesus"
- Wherever You Are, Third Day 2005 - Song: "Mountain of God"
- Bellsburg (The Songs of Rich Mullins), Bellsburg Sessions, 2022 - Song: "Both Feet On the Ground"
- There's A Rainbow Somewhere (The Songs Of Randy Stonehill), 2022 – Song: "Keep Me Runnin'"

== Personal life ==
She is married to Kenny Greenberg. They have three adult children. Cleveland is a pastoral associate at the Church of the Redeemer (Anglican Church in North America) in Nashville.
