= Do It Right (album) =

Studio album by SHINEmk
- Released: 7 May 2000
- Genre: Christian pop
- Label: Reunion
- Producer: Zarc Porter

SHINEmk chronology
Extended Play (1999)	Do It Right (2000)	Keep on Moving (2001)

Professional ratings
Review scores
Source	Rating
Allmusic	3/5 stars

Do It Right is the Dove Award-nominated debut from European pop group SHINEmk. It was released in both the US and the UK.

== Track listing ==
All tracks by Mark Pennells, Zarc Porter, except Higher Love.

1. "Do It Right" – 3:36
2. "I Feel Good" – 3:21
3. "Do You Believe in Love" – 3:47
4. "More Than Words Can Say" (Andrews, Pennells, Porter, Rodgers) – 4:10
5. "Higher Love" (Will Jennings, Steve Winwood) – 3:32
6. "I Believe in You" – 4:25
7. "Get a Life" – 3:02
8. "SHINE (For All the World)" (Andrews, Pennells, Porter) – 3:08
9. "Lifted" – 3:30
10. "I'm to Blame" – 3:43
11. "Midnight Hour" (Andrews, Pettersen, Rodgers) – 4:11
12. "I'm Never Gonna Give Up on You" (Andrews, Pennells, Pettersen, Porter) – 6:00

== Singles ==
- "Do You Believe In Love" #12 Cross Rhythms Top 100 (2000)
- "I Feel Good" #17 Cross Rhythms Top 100 (2000)
- "More Than Words Can Say" #43 Cross Rhythms Top 100 (2000)

== Personnel ==
=== Musicians ===
- Natasha Andrews – vocals
- Loretta Andrews – vocals
- Hanne Pettersen – vocals
- Nicki Rogers – vocals

=== Technical ===
- Lynn Fuston – mastering, mixing
- George King – executive producer
- Mark Pennells – executive producer
- Zarc Porter – programming, producer, vocal arrangement
- Matt Wanstall – vocal editing
- Elizabeth Workman – art direction
- Paul Yates – photography
