= A Ragamuffin Band =

Christian music group founded by Rich Mullins (1993–2000)

- Origin: Nashville, Tennessee, U.S.
- Genres: Christian music, folk, rock
- Years active: 1993–2000
- Labels: Reunion, Myrrh
- Past members: Rich Mullins; Rick Elias; Jimmy Abegg; Mark Robertson; Aaron Smith; Steve Latanation

A Ragamuffin Band was a musical group founded by Rich Mullins in 1993, when he gathered friends from other bands to back him on his A Liturgy, A Legacy, & A Ragamuffin Band album. The band continued to record and tour with Mullins, and even carried on after his 1997 death. The group's name is derived from Brennan Manning's 1990 book The Ragamuffin Gospel, which defines ragamuffins as "the burdened, the wobbly and weak-kneed, the inconsistent, unsteady disciples... the smart people who know they are stupid... the honest disciples who admit they are scalawags".

On February 2, 2019 the band reunited to perform The Jesus Record in its entirety with several guest artists to raise funds for member Rick Elias, who had been diagnosed with brain cancer the previous year. Elias died two months later on April 2, 2019.

== Discography ==
- A Liturgy, A Legacy, & A Ragamuffin Band (Reunion, 1993)
- Brother's Keeper - (Reunion, 1995)
- The Jesus Record (Myrrh, 1998)
- Prayers of a Ragamuffin (Word, 2000)

== Prayers of a Ragamuffin ==
Prayers of a Ragamuffin, released on January 4, 2000, is the fourth and final album by A Ragamuffin Band, and their only album that's not part of a project by Mullins.

track listing

1. "Make Me an Instrument" (5:41)
2. "Nothing You Don't Know" (4:43)
3. "Brother Sun, Sister Moon" (3:49)
4. "Faith, Hope and Love" (5:03)
5. "Help Thou My Unbelief" (5:42)
6. "My Heart Already Knows" (5:16)
7. "Bouncing Off the Ceiling" (4:08)
8. "God Grant Me Tears" (5:02)
9. "Shout" (2:40)
10. "We'll Be Together Again" hidden track (11:07)
