= Mitch McVicker =

American musician

- Born: November 8, 1972 (age 54)
- Origin: Topeka, Kansas, U.S.
- Genre: Contemporary Christian
- Occupations: Singer, songwriter
- Instruments: Vocals, guitar
- Years active: 1995–present

Mitchell McVicker is a contemporary Christian music singer-songwriter.

== Early life and education ==
McVicker was born on November 8, 1972 in Topeka, Kansas, to Doug and Wendee McVicker. He attended Shawnee Heights High School in Tecumseh, before studying at Allen County Community College. While there, he played for the college's basketball team and served as sports editor of the school newspaper, The ACCC Journal. In 1993, he was recruited by Friends University basketball coach Ron Heller to join their team, and began studying a degree in religion and philosophy. In his first year in the college's team he was a leading scorer, with an average 15.7 points per game.

== Career ==
=== Collaborations with Rich Mullins ===
While studying at Friends University, McVicker became close friends with contemporary Christian music (CCM) singer Rich Mullins. Following their graduation in 1995, the pair moved to New Mexico together and Mullins began teaching music to children on a Navajo reservation near Window Rock, Arizona. He also began teaching music to McVicker, and the pair began to perform and write music together: they teamed up with David "Beaker" Strasser to write the 1997 musical The Canticle of the Plain, based on the life of Francis of Assisi. An album of the musical was released later that year, with McVicker singing on four songs.

In September 1997, McVicker and Mullins recorded songs together in Chicago for the former's solo album, completing the recording on September 19. On that same day, they began travelling to Wichita, where Mullins was due to play at a benefit concert. During the journey, their vehicle swerved off the road and Mullins died after being thrown into the road. Neither man had been wearing seatbelts and McVicker was hospitalised by the accident.

In 1998, McVicker performed on A Ragamuffin Band's Homeless Man tribute tour alongside other Mullins-associated acts like This Train and the Kid Brothers of St. Frank. In 1999, McVicker won the Song of the Year Dove Award as a co-writer of the song "My Deliverer" with Mullins.

== Personal life ==
In 1999, McVicker was living in Nashville, Tennessee. In 2017, he was married and living in Atlanta, Georgia.

== Album discography ==
- Mitch McVicker (1998)
- Chasing the Horizon (2000)
- Without Looking Down (2002)
- Love Will Rise (2007)
- Always Believe (2009)
- Everything Shines (2010)
- Walking Through the Dark (2011)
- Underneath (2013)
- The Grey: When Black & White Fade (2014)
- The Acceptance of And (2018)
- A Shrugging of the Shoulders (2021)
- Behind the Lightning (2023)
- Where the Earth Makes No Sound (2024)
- After Winter Unfolding (2026)

=== Other ===
- Canticle of the Plains (1997)
- Music Inspired by the Motion Picture Ragamuffin (Based on the Life of Rich Mullins) (2014)
- Live in Morton (2016)

Awards and achievements
Preceded by "On My Knees"; David and Nicole Coleman-Mullen, Michael Ochs	GMA's Song of the Year; 1999 "My Deliverer" (with Rich Mullins)	Succeeded by "This Is Your Time"; Michael W. Smith, Wes King
