= Jimmy Abegg =

American musician (born 1954)

- Born: December 29, 1954 (age 71); Alliance, NE
- Occupation: Musician
- Label: Sparrow
- Formerly of: Panacea, Vector, Charlie Peacock Acoustic Trio, A Ragamuffin Band, Steve Taylor & The Danielson Foil, Steve Taylor & The Perfect Foil, The Ascendants

Jimmy Abegg (born December 29, 1954), also known as Jimmy A, is an American musician who grew up in Alliance, Nebraska and is currently living in Nashville, Tennessee.

== Career ==
In 1985, Abegg was a founding member of the progressive rock band Vector from Sacramento, California, which included Steve Griffith, Charlie Peacock, Aaron Smith (drums 1985) and Bruce Spencer (drums 1985–89). In the 1990s, he played as a solo musician, then joined Rich Mullins' A Ragamuffin Band and was also a member of Charlie Peacock's Acoustic Trio. He has created a variety of album artwork for artists such as Phil Keaggy, Michael W. Smith, and Chris Taylor among others. Abegg has written or co-written songs for Susan Ashton and Ji Lim. He completed a series for Vanderbilt Children's Hospital. Abegg also collaborated with Kevin Max on a collection of illustrated poems entitled At the Foot of Heaven in 1995.

Along with Vince Ebo, Abegg was a member of the Charlie Peacock Acoustic Trio. An album, Live in The Netherlands was released in 1999.

Abegg is affected by macular degeneration, but continues to paint.

== Books ==
- Abegg, Jimmy (2000). Ragamuffin Prayers. Harvest House. p. 157. ISBN 978-0-7369-0303-5.

== Discography ==
With Vector

- 1983 Mannequin Virtue
- 1985 Please Stand By
- 1989 Simple Experience
- 1995 Temptation

Solo

- 1991 Entertaining Angels
- 1994 Secrets

With Charlie Peacock

- 1984 Lie Down in the Grass
- 1987 West Coast Diaries: Vol. 1
- 1988 West Coast Diaries: Vol. 2
- 1989 West Coast Diaries: Vol. 3
- 1990 Secret of Time
- 1991 Love Life

As part of Rich Mullins & A Ragamuffin Band

- 1993 A Liturgy, a Legacy & a Ragamuffin Band
- 1995 Brother's Keeper
- 1996 Songs
- 1998 The Jesus Record
- 2000 Prayers of a Ragamuffin A Ragamuffin Band only

Collaborative works

- 1998 Demonstrations of Love
- 1999 When Worlds Collide: A Tribute to Daniel Amos a tribute to Daniel Amos
- 2002 Making God Smile: An Artists' Tribute to the Songs of Beach Boy Brian Wilson a tribute to Brian Wilson

As part of Steve Taylor & The Perfect Foil

- 2014 Goliath
- 2016 Wow to the Deadness (EP; as Steve Taylor & the Danielson Foil)
