= Pictures in the Sky =

Studio album by Rich Mullins
- Released: February 23, 1987
- Recorded: April 6–8, 1986
- Studio: Center Stage and Hummingbird Studios (Nashville, Tennessee); The Gold Mine (Brentwood, Tennessee)
- Genre: Contemporary Christian music
- Length: 35:30
- Label: Reunion
- Producer: Reed Arvin

Rich Mullins chronology
Rich Mullins (1986)	Pictures in the Sky (1987)	Winds of Heaven, Stuff of Earth (1988)

Pictures in the Sky is the second solo album by songwriter Rich Mullins and was released in 1987 on Reunion Records.

The single "Screen Door" became a concert favorite. Mullins wrote the song in Chattanooga on a trip to Knoxville, originally intending it to write a limerick. When performing "Screen Door" in concert, Mullins and his band would sing the lyrics and create the song's unique rhythm by hitting plastic cups on a table in a synchronized pattern.

== Track listing ==
=== Side one ===
1. "When You Love" (Rich Mullins) – 3:25
2. "It Don't Do" (Rich Mullins, Steve Cudworth) – 3:37
3. "Verge of a Miracle" (Rich Mullins) – 4:02
4. "Pictures In The Sky" (Rich Mullins) – 3:53
5. "Be With You" (Rich Mullins, Justin Peters) – 2:50

=== Side two ===
1. "Screen Door" (Rich Mullins) – 1:23
2. "What Trouble are Giants" (Rich Mullins) – 3:54
3. "Steal at Any Price" (Rich Mullins, Wayne Kirkpatrick) – 4:15
4. "Could be a Celebration" (Rich Mullins, Gary Jones, Renee Garcia, Reed Arvin, Lang Bliss) – 3:25
5. "Love That Knows No Bounds" (Rich Mullins, Wayne Kirkpatrick, Cathy Snyder) – 3:35

== Personnel ==
- Rich Mullins – vocals
- Reed Arvin – synthesizers (1, 5, 7–10), Synclavier (1, 5, 7–10), keyboards (2–4), footsteps (6), finger snaps (6), handclaps (6)
- Jerry McPherson – guitars (1–4, 8–10), bouzouki (7)
- Gary Lunn – bass (2–4, 9)
- Dave Adams – additional drum programming
- Keith Edwards – drums (2–4)
- Tim Marsh – percussion (2–4, 8)
- Chris Harris – backing vocals (1, 3, 6, 9)
- Mark Heimermann – backing vocals (1, 3, 4, 7, 9)
- Chris Rodriguez – backing vocals (1, 3, 4, 6, 7, 9)
- Lisa Bevill – backing vocals (2)
- Kim Fleming – backing vocals (2)
- Donna McElroy – backing vocals (2)
- Wayne Kirkpatrick – backing vocals (4, 6, 7)
- Reneé Garcia – backing vocals (9)

== Production ==
- Michael Blanton – executive producer
- Dan Harrell – executive producer
- Reed Arvin – producer
- Brent King – engineer, mixing
- Hank Williams – mastering at MasterMix (Nashville, Tennessee)
- Buddy Jackson – art direction, design
- Mark Tucker – photography
