= Rich Mullins (album) =

Studio album by Rich Mullins
- Released: January 14, 1986
- Recorded: October 1985
- Studios: OmniSound Studios and Hummingbird Studios (Nashville, Tennessee); Riverstone Studios (Franklin, Tennessee)
- Genre: Contemporary Christian music
- Length: 37:55
- Label: Reunion
- Producer: Reed Arvin

Rich Mullins chronology
| Rich Mullins (1986) | Pictures in the Sky (1987) |

Rich Mullins' debut, self-titled, solo album was released in 1986 on Reunion Records.

== Track listing ==
Side one

1. "A Few Good Men" (Rich Mullins) – 3:45
2. "A Place to Stand" (Rich Mullins) – 4:10
3. "Live Right" (Rich Mullins, Wayne Kirkpatrick, Reed Arvin) – 4:43
4. "New Heart" (Rich Mullins, Reed Arvin) – 3:10
5. "Elijah" (Rich Mullins) – 4:37

Side two

1. "Nothing but a Miracle" (Rich Mullins) – 4:06
2. "Both Feet on the Ground" (Rich Mullins, Niles Borop) – 3:41
3. "These Days" (Rich Mullins, Pam Mark Hall) – 3:41
4. "Prisoner" (Rich Mullins) – 3:27
5. "Save Me" (Rich Mullins) – 2:50

== Personnel ==
- Rich Mullins – lead vocals
- Reed Arvin – keyboards, synthesizers, Synclavier
- Phil Naish – keyboards, acoustic piano
- Greg Jennings – guitars
- Gary Lunn – bass
- Keith Edwards – drums
- Amy Grant – guest vocals (3)
- Billy Crockett – backing vocals
- Chris Harris – backing vocals
- Mark Heimermann – backing vocals
- Chris Rodriguez – backing vocals

== Production ==
- Brown Bannister – executive producer
- Michael Blanton – executive producer
- Dan Harrell – executive producer
- Reed Arvin – producer
- James "JB" Baird – engineer
- Spencer Chrislu – assistant engineer
- Keith Penny – assistant engineer
- Billy Whittington – assistant engineer
- Doug Sax – mastering at The Mastering Lab (Hollywood, California)
- Kent Hunter – art direction and design at Thomas Ryan Design
- Mark Tucker – photography
- Amy Grant – sleeve notes
