= The World as Best as I Remember It =

1991-1992 studio album series by Rich Mullins

Studio album series by Rich Mullins
- Released: July 1, 1991, June 1, 1992
- Recorded: 1991–1992
- Studio: Casa de Pepe Music; OmniSound Studios; Hummingbird Recording; Quad Studios; The Saltmine; Benson Studios; Sound Stage Studios; (Nashville, Tennessee).
- Genre: Contemporary Christian music
- Length: 36:15
- Label: Reunion
- Producer: Reed Arvin

Rich Mullins chronology
Never Picture Perfect (1989)	The World as Best as I Remember It (1991)	A Liturgy, a Legacy, & a Ragamuffin Band (1993)

Volume Two

Professional ratings
Review scores
Source	Rating
AllMusic	5/5 stars

The World as Best as I Remember It is a two-volume album series by songwriter Rich Mullins. The first volume was released in 1991 on Reunion Records and the second volume was released in 1992. The first volume was listed at No. 7 in CCM Magazine's The 100 Greatest Albums in Christian Music. "Step by Step", written by Beaker, became a popular contemporary worship song among Christians. Mullins added new verses to the song for the second volume.

== Volume One ==
=== Track listing ===
1. "Step By Step" (Beaker) – 2:39
2. "Boy Like Me/Man Like You" (Rich Mullins, Beaker) – 3:17
3. "Where You Are" (Rich Mullins, Beaker) – 3:07
4. "Jacob and 2 Women" (Rich Mullins) – 3:03
5. "The Howling" (Rich Mullins, Beaker) – 3:21
6. "Calling Out Your Name" (Rich Mullins) – 4:51
7. "Who God is Gonna Use" (Rich Mullins) – 3:10
8. "The River" (Rich Mullins) – 4:48
9. "I See You" (Rich Mullins) – 5:27
10. "Step By Step (Reprise)" (Beaker) – 2:22

=== Personnel ===
- Rich Mullins – lead vocals, acoustic piano (1, 5, 10), lap dulcimer (3, 7), hammered dulcimer (6)
- Reed Arvin – string arrangements (1, 6, 8, 9, 10), acoustic piano (3, 4, 8), keyboards (3, 6, 9), strings (3), Synclavier (4, 9)
- Billy Crockett – guitars (2)
- Jerry McPherson – guitars (3, 8, 9), electric guitar (5)
- Tom Hemby – mandolin (4), acoustic guitar (5)
- Gary Lunn – bass (2, 3, 5, 8)
- Tommy Sims – bass (7, 9, 10)
- Steve Brewster – drums (2, 5, 7)
- Paul Leim – drums (3, 8, 9)
- Eric Darken – percussion (6)
- Steve Snoddy – bagpipes (1)
- Sam Levine – recorder (2)
- Steven V. Taylor – choir arrangements (1), vocal arrangements (5)
- Tommy Gardner – boy soprano (1, 9, 10)
- Chris Rodriguez – backing vocals (2, 3, 7)
- Susan Ashton – backing vocals (3)
- Bonnie Keen – backing vocals (3)
- Vicki Hampton – backing vocals (7)
- Donna McElroy – backing vocals (7)

The Little Choir (Tracks 1, 5 & 9)

- Lisa Bevill, Chris Harris, Lisa Glasgow, Gary Janney, Tammy Jensen, Guy Penrod, Gary Robinson, Leah Taylor, Steven V. Taylor and Tricia Walker

The Big Choir (Tracks 9 & 10)

- Bev Bartsch, Michael P. Bodkin, Dane Brashear, Michele Buc, John Colton, Alfredo Coleman, Mark Comden, Don Donahue, Karen Franz, Alison Freemon, David Hamilton, Angela Hewitt, Joe Hicks, Michelle Hicks, Andy Ivey, Elizabeth Leighton Jones, Lori Lee Loving, Robert Magee, Marita Meinerts, Michael Nolan, Danny O'Lannerghty, Laurie Omahundro, Tony Peterson, Kristin Pierson, Matt Pierson, Bernie Sheahan, Bill Sinclair, Leslie Tarkington and Kevin Wolf

Production notes

- Executive Producers – Michael Blanton and Don Donahue
- Produced by Reed Arvin
- Engineered by Reed Arvin, Ronnie Brookshire, Bill Deaton, Lynn Fuston, Brent King, Penn Singleton and Rick Will.
- Second Engineers – Patrick Kelly, Doug Wildeboer and Shane Wilson.
- Mixed by Rick Will at The Castle (Franklin, Tennessee).
- Recorded at Casa de Pepe Music, OmniSound Recording Studio and Hummingbird Recording.
- Art Direction by D. Rhodes and Buddy Jackson
- Photography by Mark Tucker
- Design by Buddy Jackson for Jackson Design.

== Volume Two ==
=== Track listing ===
1. "Hello Old Friends" (Rich Mullins) – 2:10
2. "Sometimes By Step" (Rich Mullins and Beaker) – 4:53
3. "Everyman" (Rich Mullins and Beaker) – 5:25
4. "The Just Shall Live" (Rich Mullins) – 4:03
5. "Waiting" (Rich Mullins and Beaker) – 3:53
6. "To Tell Them" (Rich Mullins) – 3:45
7. "The Maker of Noses" (Rich Mullins and Beaker) – 4:55
8. "What Susan Said" (Rich Mullins) – 3:17
9. "Growing Young" (Rich Mullins and Beaker) – 4:19
10. "All The Way My Savior Leads Me" (Words by Fanny Crosby, Music by Robert Lowery, arranged by Rich Mullins) – 2:33
11. "Sometimes By Step" (Reprise) (Rich Mullins and Beaker) – 2:35

=== Personnel ===
- Rich Mullins – lead vocals, hammered dulcimer (2, 11), arrangements (10)
- Reed Arvin – string arrangements (1–4, 11), keyboards (2, 5, 7, 8, 11), acoustic piano (3, 4, 6, 9)
- Phil Madeira – Hammond B3 organ (4), organ (9)
- Billy Crockett – acoustic guitar (1, 8, 10)
- George Cocchini – guitars (3, 7), electric guitars (5, 8)
- Gordon Kennedy – guitars (3, 7, 9)
- Tom Hemby – guitars (4), acoustic guitar (5), mandolin (5)
- Gary Lunn – bass (2–4, 8–11)
- Steve Brewster – drums (2–5, 8, 9, 11), rototoms (6), fingersnaps (6), footstomps (6), cowbell (6), suspended cymbal (6), Culligan water bottle (6)
- Mark Hammond – drums (7)
- Eric Darken – percussion (2, 9, 11)
- John Catchings – strings (1)
- David Davidson – strings (1)
- Ted Madsen – strings (1)
- Kristin Wilkinson – strings (1), string contractor (1–4, 11)
- Mike Eldred – backing vocals (2, 11)
- Lisa Glasgow – backing vocals (2, 11)
- Stephanie Hall – backing vocals (2, 11)
- Mark Ivey – backing vocals (2, 11)
- Camille Renaldo – backing vocals (2, 11)
- Michael Sandifer – backing vocals (2, 11)
- Kevin Max – backing vocals (6)
- Will Owsley – backing vocals (6)
- Millard Powers – backing vocals (6)
- Billy Simon – backing vocals (7)

The Choir (Track 4)

- Bob Bailey, Vince Ebo, Kim Fleming, Vicki Hampton, Emily Harris, Robin Johnson, Donna McElroy, Howard Smith and Mervyn Warren

Production notes

- Executive Producers – Michael Blanton and Don Donahue
- Produced by Reed Arvin
- Engineered by Reed Arvin, Steve Bishir, Ronnie Brookshire, Lynn Fuston, Billy Whittington and Rick Will.
- Recorded at Quad Studios, The Saltmine, Benson Studios and Sound Stage Studios.
- Mixed by Rick Will at Sound Stage Studios, assisted by Melanie Jones.
- Mastered by Hank Williams at MasterMix (Nashville, Tennessee).
- Art Direction by D. Rhodes and Buddy Jackson
- Photography by Mark Tucker
- Design by Buddy Jackson for Jackson Design.
