= Kim Hill (Christian singer) =

American singer-songwriter (born 1963)

- Born: December 30, 1963 (age 62)
- Origin: Starkville, Mississippi
- Genres: Contemporary Christian; country
- Occupations: Singer; songwriter
- Instruments: Vocals; guitar
- Labels: Reunion Records; Sony Music Entertainment; Chordant Records; Star Song; Greentree Records; Fervent Records; 33rd Street; Kim Hill

Kim Hill (born December 30, 1963) is a contemporary Christian music singer. Aside from her career as a Grammy Award-nominated and GMA Dove Award-winning solo artist, she has sung background vocals on projects by artists including Rich Mullins (Winds of Heaven, Stuff of Earth).

== Personal life ==
Hill was born in Starkville, Mississippi and grew up in Meridian. She attended Mississippi State University in Starkville, where she participated in track and field in addition to volleyball. She moved to Nashville where she signed her first record deal with Reunion Records. Hill was married to former Auburn University football player Rob Shuler. The marriage ended in divorce. They have two sons: 3for3 band member Benji Shuler and former Stanford Cardinal football player, center Graham Shuler. Graham left Stanford after his junior year for a non-football opportunity.

Since 2021, Hill is a co-owner (with Paulette Wooten) of The Treehouse, a women's retreat in North Carolina. Hill now identifies as a lesbian with Wooten as her partner. She and Wooten formed the musical duo Wooten Hill and produced the EP Is It Alright in 2020.

== Discography ==
=== Studio albums ===
Year	Album	US CHR	Label
1988	Kim Hill		Reunion Records
1989	Talk About Life	21	Reunion Records
1991	Brave Heart	11	Reunion Records
1994	So Far So Good		Reunion/BNA Records
1997	The Fire Again	27	Chordant
1998	Arms of Mercy		StarSong
2002	Hope No Matter What		Fervent Records
2004	Real Christmas		Fervent Records
2006	Broken Things		33rd Street
2007	Surrender		Kim Hill Music
2010	Sing		33rd Street
2011	Christmas Back to You		Kim Hill Music

=== Compilation albums ===
Year	Album	US CHR	Label
1995	Testimony		Reunion
1999	Signature Songs		Green Tree
2005	Simply Kim Hill		Sony/BMG (Provident Label Group)

=== Live albums ===
Year	Album	Label
1998	Renewing the Heart Live	StarSong
1999	Renewing the Heart for Such a Time as This	StarSong
2003	Surrounded by Mercy	Fervent

=== Singles ===
Year	Title	Chart positions	Album
Year	Title	US Country	Album
1988	"Faithful"	—	Kim Hill
1989	"Snake in the Grass"	—	Talk About Life
1991	"Satisfied"	—	Brave Heart
1994	"Janie's Gone Fishin'"	68	So Far So Good
1994	"Wise Beyond Her Tears"	—	So Far So Good

=== Other charted songs ===
Year	Title	Chart positions		Album
Year	Title	US Christ AC	US Christ	Album
2005	"O Come All Ye Faithful"	11	22	Real Christmas
2005	"Angels We Have Heard on High"	29	37	Real Christmas
2005	"O Come, O Come, Emmanuel"	39	—	Real Christmas

=== Music videos ===
Year	Video	Director
1994	"Janie's Gone Fishin'"	Greg Vernon
1994	"Wise Beyond Her Tears"	Roger Pistole
1995	"Snake in the Grass"	
