= Winds of Heaven, Stuff of Earth =

Studio album by Rich Mullins
- Released: August 2, 1988
- Recorded: 1988
- Studio: Gold Mine Studios, OmniSound Studios, Spence Manor and MasterMix (Nashville, Tennessee)
- Genre: Contemporary Christian music
- Length: 36:35
- Label: Reunion
- Producer: Reed Arvin

Rich Mullins chronology
Pictures in the Sky (1987)	Winds of Heaven, Stuff of Earth (1988)	Never Picture Perfect (1989)

Professional ratings
Review scores
Source	Rating
AllMusic	4/5 stars

Winds of Heaven, Stuff of Earth is the third album by American singer and songwriter Rich Mullins, released in 1988. The album received 31st place in the book CCM Presents: The 100 Greatest Albums in Christian Music (2001).

"Awesome God" became a very popular contemporary worship song, and received first place in the book CCM Presents: 100 Greatest Songs in Christian Music (2006).

== Track listing ==
1. "The Other Side of the World" (Rich Mullins) – 2:45
2. "With the Wonder" (Rich Mullins) – 4:32
3. "Awesome God" (Rich Mullins) – 3:05
4. "If I Stand" (Rich Mullins, Steve Cudworth) – 3:46
5. "Home" (Rich Mullins) – 4:05
6. "Such a Thing as Glory" (Rich Mullins) – 2:44
7. "...and I Love You" (Rich Mullins) – 3:55
8. "Ready for the Storm" (Dougie MacLean) – 3:42
9. "One True Love" (Rich Mullins, Steve Cudworth) – 4:08
10. "How Can I Keep Myself from Singing" (Rich Mullins) – 3:53

== Personnel ==
- Rich Mullins – lead vocals, backing vocals (4, 8)
- Reed Arvin – keyboards (1–3, 5–7, 9, 10), Synclavier (1–3, 5–7, 9, 10), string arrangements (3, 5)
- Michael W. Smith – acoustic piano (4)
- Jerry McPherson – guitars (1–5, 7, 9, 10)
- Jon Goin – guitars (8)
- Gary Lunn – bass guitar (1–5, 7, 9)
- Craig Nelson – acoustic bass (8)
- Keith Edwards – drums (1–5, 7, 9)
- Rafael Padilla – percussion (1, 6, 8, 10)
- Fred Carpenter – fiddle (8)
- Alan Arnett – backing vocals (3)
- Janis Ellen Broughton – backing vocals (3)
- Heidi Brown – backing vocals (3)
- Susan Coker – backing vocals (3)
- Scott Coupland – backing vocals (3)
- Lyn Curley – backing vocals (3)
- Jennifer Farrar – backing vocals (3)
- Allison Gordley – backing vocals (3)
- Pam Mark Hall – backing vocals (3)
- Chris Harris – backing vocals (3, 4, 7, 10)
- Paul Harris – backing vocals (3)
- Mark Heimermann – backing vocals (3, 7, 10)
- Kim Hill – backing vocals (3)
- Bryan Lenox – backing vocals (3)
- Lori Lee Loving – backing vocals (3)
- David McCracken – backing vocals (3)
- Marita Meinerts – backing vocals (3)
- Carmen Minard – backing vocals (3)
- Pam Ourada – backing vocals (3)
- Cynthia Ratliff – backing vocals (3)
- Mark Ratliff – backing vocals (3)
- Melinda Scruggs – backing vocals (3)
- Billy Sprague – backing vocals (3)
- Wayne Kirkpatrick – backing vocals (4, 6)
- Billy Simon – backing vocals (4)
- Bonnie Keen – backing vocals (6)
- Melodie Tunney – backing vocals (6)
- Chris Rodriguez – backing vocals (7, 8, 10)

== Production ==
- Terry Hemmings – executive producer
- Jeff Moseley – executive producer
- Reed Arvin – producer
- Brent King – recording, mixing
- Jeff Balding – additional mixing
- Hank Williams – mastering at MasterMix
- Glenn Hall – photography
- Buddy Jackson – design
