= A Liturgy, a Legacy, & a Ragamuffin Band =

Studio album by Rich Mullins
- Released: October 26, 1993
- Recorded: 1993
- Studio: Pinebrook Recording Studio (Alexandria, Indiana); The Bennett House (Franklin, Tennessee); Skylab Studios (Nashville, Tennessee)
- Genre: Contemporary Christian music
- Length: 49:33
- Label: Reunion
- Producer: Reed Arvin

Rich Mullins chronology
The World as Best as I Remember It, Volume Two (1992)	A Liturgy, a Legacy, & a Ragamuffin Band (1993)	Brother's Keeper (1995)

Professional ratings
Review scores
Source	Rating
AllMusic	4.5/5 stars

A Liturgy, a Legacy, & a Ragamuffin Band is the seventh album by American singer and songwriter Rich Mullins, released in 1993. The album was very well received and received the third place in the book CCM Presents: The 100 Greatest Albums in Christian Music (2001).

"A Liturgy, a Legacy, & a Ragamuffin Band" is an example of a concept album, as stated in the liner notes by Mullins and album producer Reed Arvin:

Cuts 2–6 of this album loosely follow the pattern of a liturgy - a tool used for collective worship. In it there is proclamation, praise, confession of sin, affirmation of faith and celebration of grace. Cuts 7–12 are a consideration of our "secular" heritage, issues and ideas that play themselves out in the history of our country.

"How to Grow Up Big and Strong" was recorded in honor of its writer, singer Mark Heard, who died in 1992.

== Track listing ==
1. "Here in America" (Rich Mullins) – 3:57
2. "52:10" (Rich Mullins) – 3:45
3. "The Color Green" (Rich Mullins) – 5:41
4. "Hold Me Jesus" (Rich Mullins) – 3:06
5. "Creed" (Rich Mullins, Beaker) – 5:24
6. "Peace (A Communion Blessing from St. Joseph's Square)" (Rich Mullins, Beaker) – 5:23
7. "78 Eatonwood Green" (Rich Mullins, Beaker) – 2:22
8. "Hard" (Rich Mullins) – 3:51
9. "I'll Carry On" (Rich Mullins, Beaker) – 3:53
10. "You Gotta Get Up (Christmas Song)" (Rich Mullins) – 2:37
11. "How to Grow Up Big and Strong" (Mark Heard) – 5:31
12. "Land of My Sojourn" (Rich Mullins, Beaker) – 4:03

== Personnel ==
- Rich Mullins – lead vocals, hammered dulcimer, acoustic piano
- Reed Arvin – keyboards, acoustic piano
- Lee Lundgren – keyboards, squeezebox, hooter, organ
- Jimmy Abegg – acoustic guitar, electric guitar, mandolin
- Rick Elias – acoustic guitar, electric guitar
- Billy Crockett – acoustic guitar
- Beaker – lap dulcimer
- Danny O'Lannerty – acoustic bass guitar, electric bass
- Chris McHugh – drums
- Eric Darken – assorted drums, various percussions
- Judson Spence – backing vocals
- Michael Mellett – backing vocals
- Linda Elias – backing vocals
- Nicki Lundgren – backing vocals
- Jarrod Brown – backing vocals

Honorary Ragamuffins

- Mark Baldwin
- George Cocchini
- Matt Pierson
- Sam Levine

Production

- Don Donohue – A&R
- Reed Arvin – producer, additional engineer
- Tom Laune – recording, mixing
- Shane D. Wilson – second engineer, mix assistant
- Bob Clark – string engineer
- Julee Brand – production manager
- Buddy Jackson – art direction
- D. L. Rhodes – art direction
- Jackson Design – art direction, design
- Beth Lee – design

== Charts ==
Radio singles
Year	Single	Chart	Position
1994	"Creed"	U.S. Christian	9
1994	"Hard"	U.S. Christian	21
