= Rick Elias =

American singer-songwriter (1955–2019)

Richard Robert Elias
- Also known as: Rick Elias
- Born: January 7, 1955; San Diego, California
- Died: April 2, 2019 (aged 64)
- Occupation(s): Singer and songwriter
- Instrument: Vocals

Richard Robert Elias (January 7, 1955 – April 2, 2019) was an American singer and songwriter based in Nashville.

Elias is best known for being a founding member of Rich Mullins' A Ragamuffin Band, which recorded and toured from 1993 through 2000.

== Biography ==
Elias was born in San Diego, California, eventually attending Azusa Pacific University outside Los Angeles. In 1984, Elias moved to work full-time in L.A. and within a few years would be recording with producer, Niko Bolas.

Later Elias wrote and produced music in Nashville, Tennessee, while performing solo throughout the U.S. and internationally. His music was included in the 1996 movie That Thing You Do!, Dawsons Creek, My Big Fat Greek Wedding, as well as other albums, independent films, and TV shows. During his career, Elias produced for artists such as Rich Mullins, Amy Grant, Aaron Neville, Michael W. Smith, and Randy Stonehill. He released four solo projects. His work was nominated and awarded by the GMA, UCMVA, and the Nashville Music Awards. His first solo record, Rick Elias & The Confessions, was voted No. 58 in the top 100 greatest albums in Christian music, as listed by CCM Magazine in 2001.

In 2018, it was revealed that he had cancer. A benefit concert was held by members of A Ragamuffin Band and performers from The Jesus Record on February 2, 2019, to raise money for his medical bills. Elias died on April 2, 2019, from brain cancer.

== Discography ==
- Rick Elias & The Confessions (1990, Alarma)
- Ten Stories (1991, Frontline)
- Blink (1998, Pamplin)
- Confessions of a Ragamuffin (2000, KMG) (compilation album)
- Bootleg (2003) (compilation album)
- Bootleg 2: The Legend of Sonny Jim (2009) (compilation album)
- Job (2013)
