= Wes King =

American singer, songwriter, photographer, and musician

- Born: January 20, 1966 (age 60); Winder, Georgia
- Origin: Nashville, Tennessee
- Genres: Contemporary Christian music
- Occupations: Songwriter, musician, composer, photographer
- Instruments: Guitar, vocals
- Labels: Reunion, Sparrow, Word

Wes King (born January 20, 1966) is an American contemporary Christian singer, songwriter, photographer, and musician. He is perhaps best known for his 1993 album The Robe. His demo material, a cassette tape named "Lonely Poet", is sung by other artists, such as Kim Hill. He briefly attended Covenant College outside of Chattanooga, Tennessee, in the late 1980s. He also led worship at Christian youth retreat camps.

== Background ==
After picking up the guitar at the age of 14, Wes wrote his first songs two years later. After studying the Bible at Covenant College, he relocated to Franklin, Tennessee. Wes signed with Reunion Records and recorded his first solo LP The Ultimate Underlying No Denying Motivation in 1990. After issuing Sticks and Stones a year later, King resurfaced in 1993 with The Robe. 1995's Common Creed was his biggest hit to date, notching three CHR chart-toppers -- "Life Is Precious," "The Love of Christ" and the title cut. In 1997, King issued A Room Full of Stories, his most acclaimed effort yet followed by What Matters Most in 2000 which was released on Word Artisan.

In 2005 Wes was diagnosed with Lymphoma and underwent many months of extremely difficult treatments and years of side-effects. Wes is now cancer free and is feeling well enough to spend time in his studio again.

Wes King's song "Good to Be Alive" is a song of celebration and thankfulness for the life the Lord has given him. Other free downloadable singles include, "Point to the Light", "My Dear Mother" (written as a dedication to his close mother who passed just months before), and "The Robe" (remixed/mash-up as "The Robe / Come as You Are" by Masaki).

== Collaborations ==
King has collaborated with other artists on numerous occasions, most notably with artist Phil Keaggy on Invention (Keaggy, Dente & King). Credits include:

- 1989, "Talk About Life", composer, acoustic guitar Kim Hill
- 1989, "Revival", composer David Mullen
- 1991, "Brave Heart", arranger Kim Hill
- 1992, "Angels of Mercy", composer Susan Ashton
- 1993, "Orphans and Angels", background vocals, Julie Miller
- 1993, "Matter of Time", background vocals, Nina Åström
- 1994, "Walk On", composer, Susan Ashton
- 1995, "Testimony", composer, Kim Hill
- 1996, "Brother to Brother", guest artist, guitar, acoustic guitar, Michael Card
- 1997, "Invention", bouzouki, composer, acoustic guitar, electric guitar, mandolin, vocals, background vocals, Phil Keaggy
- 1998, "The Loving Kind", composer, guest artist, guitar, vocals, Cindy Morgan
- 1999, "This Is Your Time", composer, guest artist, Michael W. Smith
- 2001, "Worship", choir/chorus, composer, acoustic guitar, Michael W. Smith
- 2002, "Woven in Time", composer, guest artist, classical guitar, Steve Green
- 2002, "Worship Again", composer, Michael W. Smith
- 2003, "Signatures", bass guitar, John Michael Talbot
- 2004, "Healing Rain", composer, Michael W. Smith
- 2004, "Beyond the Gates", composer, Cans
- 2007, "It's a Wonderful Christmas", lyricist, Michael W. Smith
- 2007, "Grounded", composer, Justin Adams
- 2008, "It's Christmas", composer, Mandisa
- 2010, "Who I Am", guitar, Carmen Liana
- 2014, "The Spirit of Christmas", composer, Michael W. Smith
- 2014, "Sovereign", acoustic guitar, Michael W. Smith

== Photography ==
- 2009, "Ceremony to the Sunset", photographer, Yawning Sons

== Discography ==
- 1987: Lonely Poet (demo)
- 1990: The Ultimate Underlying No Denying Motivation (Reunion Records)
- 1991: Sticks and Stones (Reunion Records)
- 1993: The Robe (Reunion Records)
- 1995: Common Creed (Reunion Records)
- 1997: A Room Full of Stories (Sparrow Records)
- 2001: What Matters Most (Word Records)

With Phil Keaggy and Scott Dente

- 1997: Invention (Sparrow Records)

== Credited ==
- 1989: Charm Is Deceitful and Snake in the Grass (Kim Hill) on Talk About Life (Reunion Records)

== Tributes ==
- 2005: Life Is Precious: A Wes King Tribute
