= Brennan Manning =

American author, laicized priest, and public speaker (1934 – 2013)

- Born: Richard Francis Xavier Manning; April 27, 1934; New York City, U.S.
- Died: April 12, 2013 (aged 78)
- Occupation: Theologian

Richard Francis Xavier Manning, known as Brennan Manning (April 27, 1934 – April 12, 2013), was an American author, laicized Catholic priest, and public speaker. He is best known for his bestselling book The Ragamuffin Gospel.

== Early life ==
Manning was born in Depression-era Brooklyn, New York City, and was one of three children. After studying at St. John's University in Queens for two years, he enlisted in the United States Marine Corps and fought in the Korean War. After returning to the U.S., he studied journalism.

== Spiritual life ==
In February 1956, he had a powerful experience of the personal love of Jesus Christ and converted to Catholicism. He noted that, "At that moment, the entire Christian life became for me an intimate, heartfelt relationship with Jesus." He went on to study at Saint Francis University in Loretto, Pennsylvania, graduating with a degree in philosophy in 1960 and then continuing to study theology. In May 1963, he graduated from St. Francis Seminary and was ordained into the priesthood as a Franciscan. He took the name "Brennan" which was partly based on Saint Brendan but also to honor a friend of the same name.

In the late 1960s, Manning joined the Little Brothers of Jesus of Charles de Foucauld, a religious institute committed to an uncloistered, contemplative life among the poor. Manning transported water via donkey, worked as a mason's assistant and a dishwasher in France, was imprisoned (by choice) in Switzerland, and spent six months in a remote cave in the Zaragoza desert.

In the 1970s, Manning returned to the US and began writing after confronting his alcoholism. He entered rehab at the Hazelden Foundation in Center City, Minnesota.

== Public life ==
By 1982, he had published several books and he decided to leave the Franciscan order. He moved to New Orleans and married Roslyn Ann Walker. He struggled with alcohol for the rest of his life and he and Roslyn divorced in 2000.

Manning's writings led to a more public ministry, and he was often asked to speak and to lead spiritual retreats. He saw his work as sharing the news of God's love for people.

Manning was often public about his faults, noting at his high school reunion that during his life he had been "promiscuous, a liar, envious of the gifts of others, insufferably arrogant, a people-pleaser and a braggart", but he shared how, "By sheer undeserved grace, I've been able to abandon myself in unshaken trust to the compassion and mercy of Jesus Christ."

== Popular culture ==
At one event he led singer Rich Mullins on a three-day silent retreat. This started a life-long friendship between the two, and Mullins named his backing group "a Ragamuffin Band."

The following quote appeared in the prelude to dc Talk's song "What If I Stumble?" It also appeared on an intro track for the Christian metalcore band War of Ages on its album Fire from the Tomb:

The greatest single cause of atheism in the world today is Christians who acknowledge Jesus with their lips and walk out the door and deny Him by their lifestyle. That is what an unbelieving world simply finds unbelievable.

— Brennan Manning

== Death ==
Manning died on April 12, 2013, in New Orleans. He died of Wernicke–Korsakoff syndrome, a neurological disorder which may have been accelerated by misuse of alcohol.

== Bibliography ==
- Gentle Revolutionaries, 1970
- Souvenirs of Solitude, 1979
- Stranger to Self-Hatred, 1981
- Parable of William Juan, 1985
- Prophets & Lovers: In Search of the Holy Spirit, 1985
- Lion and Lamb/the Relentless Tenderness of Jesus, 1986
- The Signature of Jesus, 1988
- Manning, Brennan (2005) [1990]. The Ragamuffin Gospel.
- Abba's Child: The Cry of the Heart for Intimate Belonging, 1994 (NavPress)
- The Signature of Jesus, 1996
- The Boy Who Cried Abba: A Parable of Trust and Acceptance, 1996
- Reflections for Ragamuffins: Daily Devotions from the Writings of Brennan Manning, 1998
- Ruthless Trust: The Ragamuffin's Path to God, 2000
- Rich Mullins: An Arrow Pointing to Heaven, 2001 (foreword only)
- Manning, Brennan (2002). The Wisdom of Tenderness: What Happens When God's Fierce Mercy Transforms Our Lives. New York: HarperOne. p. 179. ISBN 978-0-06-072446-7. Archived from the original on October 22, 2012.
- The Journey of the Prodigal: A Parable of Sin and Redemption, 2002 (b)
- A Glimpse of Jesus: The Stranger to Self-Hatred, 2003
- The Rabbi's Heartbeat, 2003
- Posers, Fakers, and Wannabes: Unmasking the Real You, 2003
- The Importance of Being Foolish: How to think like Jesus 2006
- The Furious Longing of God, 2009
- Souvenirs of Solitude: Finding Rest in Abba's Embrace, 2009 (2nd Ed, NavPress)
- Patched Together: A Story of My Story, 2010
- All Is Grace: A Ragamuffin Memoir, 2011

== Filmography ==
- Ragamuffin, 2014 (portrayed by Charles Lawlor)
- Brennan, 2016
