= Rich Mullins =

American Christian musician (1955–1997)

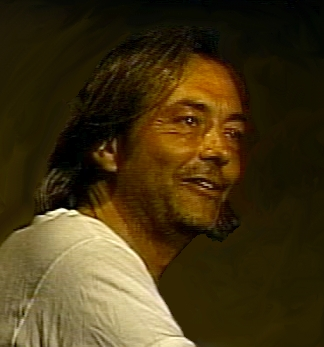
- Mullins in July 1997

Background information
- Born: Richard Wayne Mullins; October 21, 1955; Richmond, Indiana, U.S.
- Died: September 19, 1997 (aged 41) Lostant, Illinois, U.S.
- Genre: Contemporary Christian
- Occupations: Singer, songwriter
- Instruments: Vocals; keyboards; guitar; dulcimer
- Years active: 1970s–1997
- Label: Reunion
- Formerly of: New Creations Choir; Zion; A Ragamuffin Band

Richard Wayne Mullins (October 21, 1955 – September 19, 1997) was an American contemporary Christian music singer and songwriter best known for his worship songs "Awesome God" and "Sometimes by Step". Some of his albums were listed by CCM Magazine in their ranking of the 100 Greatest Albums in Christian Music, including A Liturgy, a Legacy, & a Ragamuffin Band (1993) at No. 3, The World As Best As I Remember It, Volume One (1991) at No. 7, and Winds of Heaven, Stuff of Earth (1988) at No. 31.

Mullins' songs have been performed by numerous artists, including Caedmon's Call, Five Iron Frenzy, Amy Grant, Carolyn Arends, Jars of Clay, Michael W. Smith, John Tesh, Chris Rice, Kirk Franklin, Rebecca St. James, Hillsong United and Third Day. During a tribute to Mullins' life at the 1998 GMA Dove Awards, Amy Grant described him as "the uneasy conscience of Christian music." Mullins was heavily influenced by St. Francis of Assisi and in 1997 composed a musical, Canticle of the Plains, a retelling of the life of St. Francis set in the Old West. Mullins planned to convert to Catholicism before his death in a car crash in September 1997.

== Biography ==
=== Early life and education ===
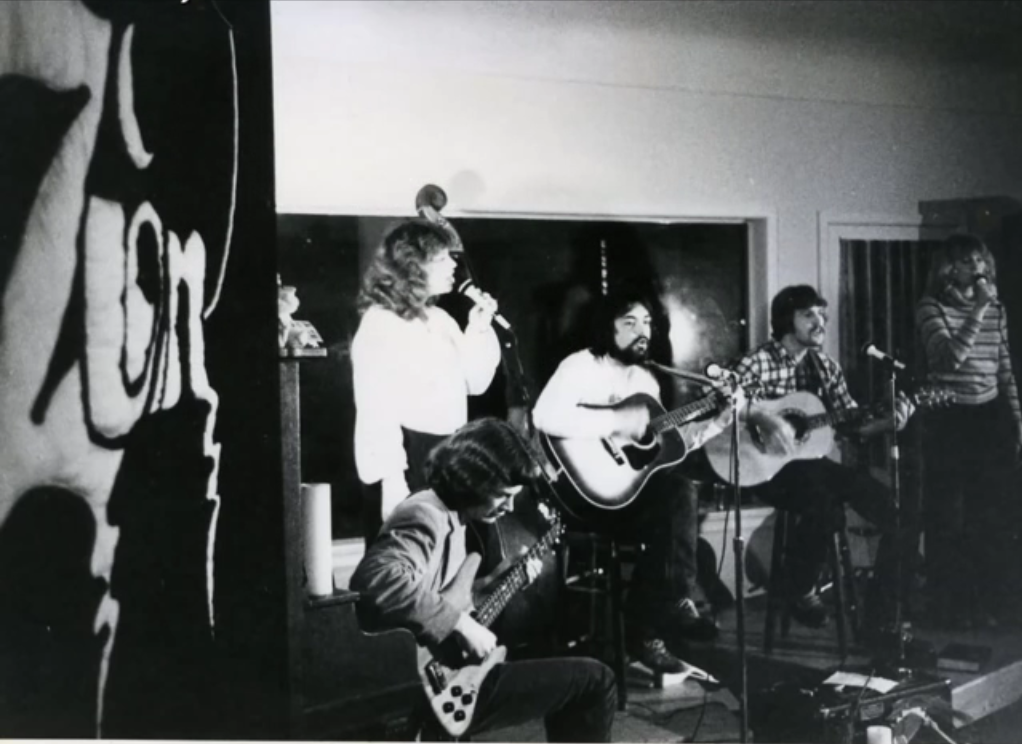
Mullins (third from right) performing in 1979, seen here with his band Zion

Richard Wayne Mullins was born to John Mullins, a tree farmer, and Neva Mullins, whose ancestors were Quakers. He had two sisters and two brothers. The family called him by his middle name, Wayne, which he went by until college, when his friends called him Richard. Mullins grew up attending Arba Friends Meeting, a church in Lynn, Indiana. The Quaker testimonies of peace and social justice later inspired many of his lyrics. When Mullins was in elementary school, his family moved and started attending Whitewater Christian Church, which he attended until he graduated. Mullins was baptized when he was in the 3rd grade. His great-grandmother taught him to play hymns and sing in four-part harmony when he was very young, and he began to study classical piano with a Quaker teacher while in elementary school. He graduated from Northeastern High School in 1974.

Mullins was inspired when the Beatles first appeared on The Ed Sullivan Show in 1964. The event helped Mullins understand the influence of music. He was a fan of the Beatles music, and he was able to identify with John Lennon in particular, despite philosophical differences. In his song "Elijah", written around the time of Lennon's murder, he included the phrase "candlelight in Central Park." This was a reference to the candlelight vigils held in the wake of the event. The places of the vigils went on to become a permanent memorial to John Lennon.

An important part of Mullins' early musical experience was being the pianist, songwriter and vocalist for the New Creations Choir in Richmond, Indiana, which was started by Tim and Bonnie Cummings in the early 1970s. The choir toured numerous states in its own bus and even produced an album. New Creations is a church and school for teens, and Mullins was a contributing factor in its beginning.

From 1974 to 1978, Mullins attended Cincinnati Bible College. He worked in a parking garage to help pay for his schooling. During this time, Mullins performed with a college band, and later the band Zion, who released one album, for which he wrote all the songs.

=== Early career ===
From 1975 to 1978, he was the youth pastor and music director at the United Methodist Church in Erlanger, Kentucky. Mullins was then focusing on his duties in the church, and performed minimally in public. He considered his music a hobby. His views on his music continued this way until 1978, when he took a group of teens from his church to the Ichthus Festival in Wilmore, Kentucky. He said that during this trip he witnessed the effect of music on the lives of young people, and decided to start pursuing music full-time.

==== Kansas and the move to Navajo Nation ====
The location of the Navajo Nation territory in the United States

During the late 1980s, Mullins desired change and formulated a plan to leave Tennessee. He took steps to become a music teacher on a Native American reservation he had visited before. In 1988, Mullins moved from Bellsburg to Wichita, Kansas where, in 1991, he attended Friends University. During this time he lived with his best friend, David "Beaker" Strasser. As part of his degree program, Mullins served as the choir director at West Evangelical Free Church. While in Wichita, he also regularly attended Central Christian Church. He graduated with a bachelor's degree (BA) in Music Education from Friends University on May 14, 1995. His 1991 song "Calling Out Your Name" included a reference to The Keeper of the Plains, a 44 ft tall sculpture in Wichita.

You have to figure out where you're most alive, most vital, and go there. For some people, that's a music career or being a housewife. For me, it's being here.

— Mullins on his move

After graduation, he and Mitch McVicker moved to a Navajo reservation in Tse Bonito, New Mexico to teach music to children. Mullins and McVicker lived in a small hogan on the reservation until Mullins' death in 1997.

In 1996, at the Ichthus music festival, Mullins cited personal reasons for his move. He was asked if he made the move because God had called him to proselytize and convert the Native Americans. To this Mullins responded:

"No. I think I just got tired of a White, Evangelical, middle class perspective on God, and I thought I would have more luck finding Christ among the Pagan Navajos. I'm teaching music."

=== Music career ===
Mullins had a distinctive talent both as a performer and a songwriter. His compositions showed distinction in two ways: unusual and sometimes striking instrumentation, and complex lyrics that usually employed elaborate metaphors.

Mullins did most of his composing and performing on piano and acoustic guitar, but he also had a prodigious talent for obscure instruments. He displayed arguably virtuoso skills on the hammered dulcimer (in "Calling out Your Name" and "Creed"), lap dulcimer (in "Who God is Gonna Use" and "Where You Are"), and the Irish tin whistle (in "Boy Like Me/Man Like You" and "The Color Green").

Mullins formed his first band in 1976 to 77 while attending Cincinnati Bible College. In 1983 Debby Boone recorded Mullins' "O Come All Ye Faithful", for her Surrender album. In 1984, the song was also featured in a TV film, Sins of the Past.

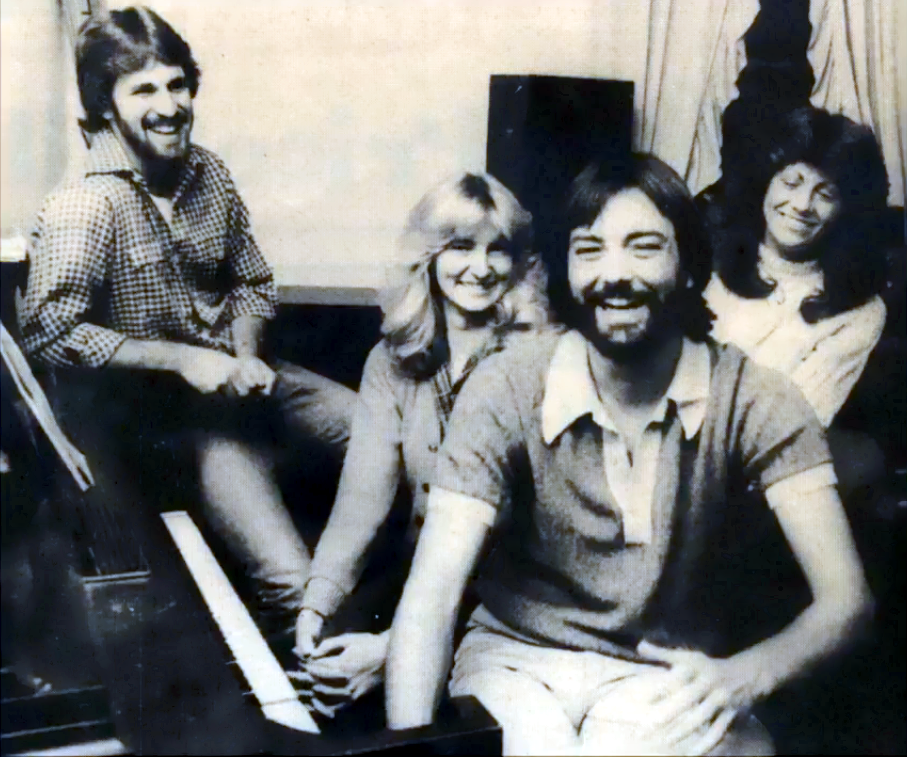
Mullins (second from right) pictured with his band Zion c. 1978

His musical career formally began with Zion Ministries in the late 1970s, where he wrote music and performed with a band called Zion. The band released one album in 1981, Behold the Man. While working for this ministry, Mullins wrote a song called "Sing Your Praise to the Lord", which was recorded by singer Amy Grant in 1982 and became an immediate hit on Christian radio.

==== Beginnings as a recording artist ====
Mullins' start in the Christian music industry occurred in mid-1981 when Amy Grant recorded his song "Sing Your Praise to the Lord." The decision was made to stop touring as "Zion," and for Mullins to start his solo career. He moved to Bellsburg, Tennessee, approximately 45 minutes from Nashville, to begin his professional recording career. Mullins got engaged sometime between the late 70s and early 80s, and wrote the song "Doubly Good to You" (recorded by Amy Grant on her album Straight Ahead) for his upcoming wedding. However, his fiancée broke off the engagement in 1982. In response to the breakup, Mullins wrote "Damascus Road".

Years later, Mullins shared thoughts about his relationships and personal life in a radio interview with Rick Tarrant:

I would always be frustrated with all those relationships even when I was engaged. I had a ten-year thing with this girl and I would often wonder why, even in those most intimate moments of our relationship, I would still feel really lonely. And it was just a few years ago that I finally realized that friendship is not a remedy for loneliness. Loneliness is a part of our experience and if we are looking for relief from loneliness in friendship, we are only going to frustrate the friendship. Friendship, camaraderie, intimacy, all those things, and loneliness live together in the same experience.

==== Later recording career ====
In 1987, Mullins spent time teaching conversational English in a South Korean seminary. He then served briefly as a missionary in Thailand where he became involved with a ministry teaching trades and providing medical care to Chinese refugees. He wrote the song "The Other Side of the World" about his time in Asia.

In 1986, Mullins released his eponymous debut album, followed in 1987 by Pictures in the Sky. Neither album sold very well, but the Christian radio hit "Awesome God" on his third album, Winds of Heaven, Stuff of Earth, brought his music to a wider audience. The song "Awesome God" was written either at Rock Lake Christian Assembly camp in Michigan, or on the way to a youth conference in Bolivar, Missouri in July 1987. The details of the song's composition are sketchy. As is often true of the work of touring musicians, a song will incubate for several weeks, months, or even years, before it coheres into something recognizable to the writer. It seems this was the case for "Awesome God" as well.

In the early 1990s, Mullins released a pair of albums entitled The World As Best As I Remember It, Volume One and Volume Two. These featured a more stripped-back, acoustic feel than his earlier work, with nods to Irish music. "Step By Step", a song written by his friend Beaker and included on volume one, and incorporated into "Sometimes By Step" with additional lyrics by Mullins on volume two, became an instant hit on Christian radio, and, like "Awesome God", it became a popular praise chorus. Both during and after Mullins' college years, Beaker was a substantial influence on Mullins and his music. Beaker co-wrote, performed, and toured with Mullins for several years. The first song they wrote together was "Boy Like Me, Man Like You", a 1991 hit for Mullins. Mullins wrote his hit song "Let Mercy Lead" for Beaker's son Aidan.

In 1993, Mullins assembled a group of Nashville musicians (including Jimmy Abegg, Beaker, Billy Crockett, Phil Madeira, Rick Elias, and Aaron Smith) to form A Ragamuffin Band, whose name was inspired by the Christian book The Ragamuffin Gospel by Brennan Manning. The band recorded A Liturgy, a Legacy, & a Ragamuffin Band, which was later named the No. 3 best Christian album of all time by CCM Magazine. Liturgy was a concept album that drew its inspiration, in part, from the Catholic liturgy. The Ragamuffins also appeared on Mullins' 1995 record Brother's Keeper and his 1998 record The Jesus Record. Mark Robertson joined the Ragamuffins as the band's bass player for touring and The Jesus Record.

In 1997, Mullins teamed up with Beaker and Mitch McVicker to write a musical based on the life of St. Francis of Assisi: The Canticle of the Plains. Mullins had great respect for St. Francis, and even formed "The Kid Brothers of St. Frank" in the late 1980s with Beaker.

Shortly before his death, Mullins had been working on his next project, which was to be a concept album based on the life of Jesus Christ and was to be called Ten Songs About Jesus. On September 10, 1997, nine days before his death, he made a rough microcassette recording of the album's songs in an abandoned church. This tape was released as disc 1 of The Jesus Record, which featured new recordings of the songs on disc 2 by the Ragamuffin Band, with guest vocalists Amy Grant, Michael W. Smith, Ashley Cleveland, and Phil Keaggy. "Heaven in His Eyes" was not a new song, but had been written more than two decades earlier, and was a beloved favorite of Mullins'.

Mullins recorded the duet "I Believe" with Hokus Pick on the album Brothers From Different Mothers in 1994. In addition to vocals, Mullins performed on the lap and hammered dulcimers.

=== Catholicism ===
Mullins's interest in the life of St. Francis of Assisi led to an attraction to Catholicism in his final years. There was no daily Protestant service on his area of the Navajo reservation, so Mullins frequently attended daily Mass. In 1997, Mullins declared:

A lot of the stuff which I thought was so different between Protestants and Catholics [was] not, but at the end of going through an RCIA (Rite of Christian Initiation for Adults) course, I also realized that there are some real and significant differences. I'm not sure which side of the issues I come down on. My openness to Catholicism was very scary to me because, when you grow up in a church where they don't even put up a cross, many things were foreign to me. I went to an older Protestant gentleman that I've respected for years and years, and I asked him, "When does faithfulness to Jesus call us to lay aside our biases and when does it call us to stand beside them?" His answer to me was that it is not about being Catholic or Protestant. It is about being faithful to Jesus. The issue is not about which church you go to, it is about following Jesus where He leads you. "If God leads you to the Catholic Church, follow Him. So, the last couple of years now, I have been in Limbo about the whole thing. For me, it all comes down to the Eucharist. Is it really Jesus and is He present there? I think, after some pretty honest searching, I’ve come to a few dead ends that I am not going to be able to bridge by getting more information. It will just require a little more faith on my part, and it is not there yet."

The night before his accident, Mullins spoke to his spiritual director, Fr Matt McGuinness, on the phone and made arrangements to formally enter the Catholic Church that weekend. He stated "This may sound strange, but I need to receive the Body and Blood of Christ."

=== Death ===
On September 19, 1997, Mullins died in a traffic accident near Lostant, Illinois, while traveling from Chicago with his friend, singer Mitchell McVicker, to a benefit concert in Wichita, Kansas. Multiple reports said the vehicle went out of control on I-39, ejecting both Mullins and McVicker, after which Mullins was struck and run over by a tractor-trailer. Some coverage reported that the vehicle's driver was not identified at the time, and one account stated that neither occupant was wearing a seat belt. McVicker was seriously injured but survived.

Mullins' open visitation was held at Whitewater Christian Church near Richmond, Indiana and attracted a large gathering. Services for Mullins were held at the former Fountain City Wesleyan Church north of Richmond. He is buried at the Harrison Township cemetery in Hollansburg, Ohio, alongside his brother, who died in infancy, and his parents.

== Personal life ==
Mullins spoke of his addiction to alcohol and also of struggles with depression.

== Philosophy and philanthropy ==
The profits from his tours and the sale of each album were entrusted to his church elders, who divided it up, paid Mullins the average salary for a laborer in the U.S. for that year, and gave the rest to charity. Mullins was also a major supporter of Compassion International and Compassion USA.

His philosophy can be understood by a quote he gave at a concert shortly before his death. He said,

Jesus said whatever you do to the least of these my brothers you've done it to me. And this is what I've come to think. That if I want to identify fully with Jesus Christ, who I claim to be my Savior and Lord, the best way that I can do that is to identify with the poor. This I know will go against the teachings of all the popular evangelical preachers. But they're just wrong. They're not bad, they're just wrong. Christianity is not about building an absolutely secure little niche in the world where you can live with your perfect little wife and your perfect little children in a beautiful little house where you have no gays or minority groups anywhere near you. Christianity is about learning to love like Jesus loved, and Jesus loved the poor and Jesus loved the broken-hearted.

== Legacy ==
In 1998, the tribute album Awesome God: A Tribute to Rich Mullins was released, featuring favorite Mullins songs reinterpreted by his Christian music peers.

Mullins' family founded The Legacy of a Kid Brother of St. Frank to continue his mission to develop programs of art, drama and music camps for Native American youth and provide a traveling music school serving remote areas of the reservations.

On April 29, 2014, Mullins was posthumously inducted into the Gospel Music Hall of Fame. His brother, David, was on hand to accept on behalf of the family.

Musicians Andrew Peterson, Matt Maher, and activist Shane Claiborne have cited Mullins as influential. Claiborne listed Rich Mullins on his list of contemporary Christian saints and martyrs deserving a "feast day" of remembrance.

Color Green Films, with Kid Brothers of St. Frank Co., developed a full-length feature film, as well as a documentary, based on Mullins' life and legacy. The film, Ragamuffin, finished filming in October 2012 and premiered in Wichita, Kansas on January 9, 2014.

Singer/songwriter John Darnielle of The Mountain Goats, an indie folk band, mentioned his appreciation for Mullins' songs during a difficult time in his life.

== Discography ==
- Rich Mullins (1986)
- Pictures in the Sky (1987)
- Winds of Heaven, Stuff of Earth (1988)
- Never Picture Perfect (1989)
- The World as Best as I Remember It, Vol. 1 (1991)
- The World as Best as I Remember It, Vol. 2 (1992)
- A Liturgy, a Legacy, & a Ragamuffin Band (1993)
- Brother's Keeper (1995)
- The Jesus Record (1998, posthumous)

== Awards and nominations ==
=== GMA Dove Awards ===
Year	Nominee / Work	Category	Result	Ref.
1983	"Sing Your Praise to the Lord" (as songwriter)	Song of the Year	Nominated	
1991	"Awesome God"	Song of the Year	Nominated	
1991	"Bound to Come Some Trouble"	Inspirational Recorded Song of the Year	Nominated	
1991	"Higher Education and the Book of Love"	Rock Recorded Song of the Year	Nominated	
1993	"Sometimes By Step"	Song of the Year	Nominated	
1993	"Sometimes By Step"	Inspirational Recorded Song of the Year	Nominated	
1994	"Hold Me, Jesus"	Song of the Year	Nominated	
1994	"Hold Me, Jesus"	Contemporary Recorded Song of the Year	Nominated	
1994	A Liturgy, a Legacy, & a Ragamuffin Band	Recorded Music Packaging of the Year	Nominated	
1995	"Creed"	Song of the Year	Nominated	
1996	Rich Mullins	Songwriter of the Year	Nominated	
1997	Songs	Recorded Music Packaging of the Year	Nominated	
1998	Rich Mullins	Artist of the Year	Won	
1998	Rich Mullins	Male Vocalist of the Year	Nominated	
1998	"Hope To Carry On"	Song of the Year	Nominated	
1998	"Elijah"	Pop/Contemporary Recorded Song of the Year	Nominated	
1999	"My Deliverer"	Song of the Year	Won	
1999	Rich Mullins	Songwriter of the Year	Won	
1999	The Jesus Record	Pop/Contemporary Album of the Year	Nominated	
1999	The Jesus Record	Recorded Music Packaging of the Year	Won	
2004	Here in America	Recorded Music Packaging of the Year	Nominated	

=== Billboard Music Video Awards ===
Year	Nominee / Work	Category	Result	Ref.
1997	"Hope To Carry On" (with Caedmon's Call)	Best New Artist Clip (Contemporary Christian)	Nominated	

== Documentaries ==
- 1998: Homeless Man: The Restless Heart of Rich Mullins, directed by Ben Pearson
- 2014: Rich Mullins: A Ragamuffin's Legacy, directed by David Leo Schultz
- 2020: The Work You Began: The Last Days of Rich Mullins, directed by Andrew Montonera
