= Reed Arvin =

American novelist

Reed Arvin is an American record producer, keyboardist, and writer known for his work producing music for singer Rich Mullins. In the early 1980s, Arvin toured as Amy Grant's keyboard player, before teaming with Mullins in 1986. Arvin produced nine albums for Mullins, including two "best of" collections, Songs and Songs 2.

Arvin's first novel, entitled The Wind in the Wheat, was published in 1994. His second novel, a legal thriller called The Will, was published in 2000. Kiss' Gene Simmons optioned the film rights to The Will shortly after its publication. Since then, Arvin has published two other critically acclaimed thrillers, The Last Goodbye and Blood of Angels. In 2025, Arvin was named a Centennial Medalist by the University of Miami Frost School in Coral Gables, Florida as being one of the most professionally accomplished alumni of the school's first 100 years. From September 2026, Arvin has been a member of the Nashville Symphony's board of directors.

== Bibliography ==
- The Wind in the Wheat, 1994
- The Will, 2000
- The Last Goodbye
- Blood of Angels
