= Reunion Records =

American Christian record label

- Parent company: Sony Music Entertainment
- Founded: 1982
- Founder: Michael Blanton, Dan Harrell
- Distributor: Provident-Integrity Distribution
- Genre: Contemporary Christian, pop rock
- Country of origin: United States
- Location: Franklin, Tennessee, U.S.
- Official website: providentlabelgroup.com

Reunion Records is a contemporary Christian record label based in Brentwood, Tennessee, that operates under the Provident Label Group. It was founded in 1982 by Dan Harrell and Mike Blanton.

== History ==
The label was formed by Amy Grant's managers (Harrell being her brother-in-law), with the label's original intent to give new artist Kathy Troccoli a home after being rejected by the major labels at the time. Troccoli, Michael W. Smith and Rich Mullins were the label's first three artists.

In 1990, they signed a new distribution deal with Geffen Records. In 1992 50% of Reunion Records was sold to BMG and by 1995 the other half was also acquired by BMG. For a time following the BMG acquisition they distributed through RCA Records. From 1995 until 1996, it was part of Arista Records (a BMG company). In October 1996, the label was sold to Zomba Records. Through eventual consolidation, it is now part of Sony Music.

Mike Blanton and Dan Harrell partnered with Steve Thomas to create BHT Entertainment in 2003. The label signed a distribution agreement with Word Records.

== Notable artists ==
Current roster:

- Steven Curtis Chapman
- Jason Crabb
- Casting Crowns
- Brandon Heath
- Jamie Kimmett
- Rebecca St. James
- Tenth Avenue North
- Tim Timmons
- Matthew West
- TobyMac

=== Former ===
- 1GN (inactive)
- Austin Adamec (active)
- All Star United (active, with Double Happiness/Fierce UK)
- Anthem Lights (active, independent)
- The Archers (Active)
- Matt Brouwer (active, with Black Shoe Records)
- Building 429 (active, with 3rd Wave Music)
- Gary Chapman (inactive)
- Church of Rhythm (disbanded)
- Ashley Cleveland (active)
- Rick Cua (Active with Blues Council)
- Renee Garcia (Active with Bliss Bliss)
- Kim Hill (active, with 33rd Street Records)
- Michael James (inactive)
- Michael Peace (inactive)
- Wes King (Active)
- Ana Laura (active, with Integrity Latin)
- Leeland (active, with Essential Records)
- Brian Littrell (active)
- Michael W. Smith (currently on Rocketown Records)
- Lindsay McCaul (active, with Centricity)
- Rich Mullins (deceased)
- PRISM (Chris Harris, Mark Heimermann Conceptual Album Series) (inactive)
- Kerrie Roberts (currently independent)
- SHINEmk (disbanded)
- Phil Stacey (active)
- The Prayer Chain (inactive)
- Third Day (disbanded, had moved to Essential Records)
- Kathy Troccoli (active, with KT Records)
- Tauren Wells (active, with Sparrow Records)
- Joy Williams (currently independent)
