= Steve Taylor & The Perfect Foil =

American alternative rock supergroup

- Also known as: Steve Taylor & Some Other Band, Steve Taylor & The Danielson Foil
- Genres: Alternative rock, Christian rock, punk rock, post-punk revival
- Years active: 2010–present
- Labels: Splint; Sounds Familyre
- Members: Steve Taylor; Peter Furler; Jimmy Abegg; John Mark Painter; Daniel Smith
- Website: facebook.com/SteveTaylorTPF/

Steve Taylor & The Perfect Foil is an American alternative rock supergroup formed in 2010 by singer Steve Taylor with drummer Peter Furler (Newsboys, Peter Furler Band), guitarist Jimmy Abegg (Vector, A Ragamuffin Band), and bassist John Mark Painter (Fleming and John). Taylor formerly saw success as a new wave singer during the 1980s and early 1990s, and also fronted the short-lived band Chagall Guevara. However, by the mid-1990s he abandoned performing music and transitioned into work as a record producer, songwriter, and film-maker. In 2010 Taylor, who was frustrated at the slow pace of his fundraiser for his feature film Blue Like Jazz, collaborated with Furler, Abegg, and Painter to record the song "A Life Preserved" for the film's soundtrack, and began recording other material. Taylor, Abegg, and Painter then featured on the Peter Furler song "Closer", under the name "Steve Taylor & Some Other Band", on Furler's album On Fire. With those collaborations as a starting point, Taylor relaunched his career as a performing musician, and the lineup was branded as Steve Taylor & The Perfect Foil. The group released a studio album entitled Goliath on November 18, 2014 to critical acclaim and modest commercial success. In 2015, Daniel Smith of Danielson, with whom the band had been touring, joined on in a collaboration touted as Steve Taylor & The Danielson Foil. Under this incarnation, the group released the EP Wow to the Deadness on February 5, 2016, and toured until February 12. A live album under this incarnation of the band was also released, and the band also contributed to the soundtrack for the 2020 film Electric Jesus.

== History ==
=== Background ===
Steve Taylor began his career as a solo artist during the early 1980s in the burgeoning contemporary Christian music scene. Backed by a shifting cast of musicians called "Some Band", Taylor melded a new wave and post-punk sound with clownish stage antics, targeting Christianity and contemporary society with confrontational, highly satirical lyrics. He debuted with the EP I Want to Be a Clone in 1983, and his first studio album, Meltdown, followed in 1984. With these releases, Taylor quickly garnered popularity as well as critical acclaim. He released two more studio albums, On the Fritz and I Predict 1990. However, despite his popularity within Christian music, he also attracted controversy due to his biting satire, particularly with I Predict 1990. Frustrated by the limitations of Christian music, Taylor abandoned the scene and, in 1989, started the band Chagall Guevara, which signed to MCA in an attempt to break into the general market. The band proved short-lived, however, as its self-titled debut album fared poorly commercially despite receiving lavish critical praise. Chagall Guevara disbanded in 1993, and Taylor released another solo studio album, Squint, in the same year, before retiring from performing music. Already a successful producer and songwriter for Newsboys, a Christian pop rock band founded by Peter Furler, Taylor started a record label, Squint Entertainment, in 1997, which propelled the careers of bands such as Sixpence None the Richer, Burlap to Cashmere, and Chevelle. This venture also proved short-lived, however, as Taylor was ousted from Squint by the label's parent, Word Entertainment, in 2001. Taylor continued producing and song-writing for various artists, and ventured into film-making, writing, directing, and producing the feature films Down Under the Big Top (1996), The Second Chance (2006), and Blue Like Jazz (2012).

Peter Furler entered music as the co-founder of Newboys in Australia in 1985, for which he initially played drums and provided backing vocals. The band re-located to the United States in 1987, and released three studio albums to little success. However, Newsboys attracted the attention of Steve Taylor, who contributed on the band as a producer and songwriter for its fourth release, Not Ashamed. The track "I'm Not Ashamed" became a Christian radio hit, launching the band into the forefront of contemporary Christian music, and Taylor continued to produce and co-write for the band. After the departure of lead vocalist John James, Furler switched from drums to guitar and lead vocals, carrying the band into the new millennium. In 2009, after over twenty-years in the band, Furler stepped down from Newsboys, pursuing a career instead as a producer, music executive, and solo artist. In 2012, he formed a new project, Peter Furler Band.

Jimmy Abegg entered the music scene as part of the alternative rock band Vector, formed in 1983. He also backed the solo projects of musicians and songwriters Charlie Peacock and Rich Mullins, and served in Mullins' A Ragamuffin Band. He has released two solo albums, Entertaining Angel (1991) and Secrets (1994), and also works as a visual artist. John Mark Painter is a multi-instrumentalist and a member of the band Fleming and John, which he had formed with his wife, Fleming McWilliams, in 1991. The duo released two albums, Delusions of Grandeur (1991, re-released 1994) and The Way We Are (1999). In addition to his work in Fleming and John, Painter is a sought after session musician, having contributed to numerous recordings by other artists, including John Mayer, Indigo Girls, Jewel, Phil Keaggy, Sixpence None the Richer, Jon Foreman, Sevendust, and Ben Folds Five.

=== Formation (2010–2013) ===
The beginnings of what would become Steve Taylor & The Perfect Foil emerged during the development of Taylor's feature film Blue Like Jazz. Taylor had difficulty procuring funding, and, frustrated at the slow progress, he and Peter Furler, for whom Taylor was working as a songwriter, decided to write a song for the film's soundtrack. Taylor contacted Jimmy Abegg and John Mark Painter, and the quartet recorded "A Life Preserved". In 2011, Peter Furler, former member of Newsboys, revealed in an interview that he, Taylor, Abegg and Painter had started recording for a new project by Taylor. At that time, the band was still unnamed, and referred to itself as "Steve Taylor and Some Other Band". Under this name, the four artists appeared together on the song "Closer" from Furler's solo album On Fire. Due to Furler's contract restrictions, the band decided to let Taylor front the project under his name, with Furler, Abegg, and Painter supporting him under the moniker "The Perfect Foil". (Taylor has hinted the name And The Perfect Foil is a reflection of the band member's last names: Abegg, Taylor, Painter, Furler.)The band launched a fundraising campaign on Kickstarter, a method that proved highly successful for funding Blue Like Jazz. The band raised over $120,000 USD, and began recording in late November 2013.

=== Goliath and Steve Taylor & the Danielson Foil (2014–present) ===
Goliath was released on November 18, 2014, through Splint Entertainment to critical acclaim and a modest commercial reception, charting at No. 22 on the Billboard Christian Albums chart. It included a re-recorded version of "A Life Preserved" from Blue Like Jazz. Reviewers praised the album for its hard-edged rock sound and intelligent lyrics, with some considering it Taylor's best work to date, and Popdose.com calling it "the best album of the year." Four music videos were released to promote Goliath: "Only a Ride", "Standing in Line", "Goliath", and "Moonshot". "Only a Ride" featured clips from the movie Stunt Rock, and "Standing in Line" consists entirely of footage taken from The Departure. In 2015, a deluxe edition of the album was released through Splint, and several vinyl editions through Sounds Familyre Records.

While on tour in 2014, Steve Taylor & The Perfect Foil were supported by Danielson. Daniel Smith, the founder of Danielson, decided to join the group in a temporary collaboration dubbed Steve Taylor & The Danielson Foil. In 2015 recorded an EP, Wow to the Deadness, produced by Steve Albini. The title track from the EP was made available for streaming on the Guitar World website on December 10, 2015. A music video for the title track premiered on Paste on January 25, 2016, and features the band members fighting each other with water balloons. The EP was released on February 5, and the band continued to tour as Steve Taylor & The Danielson Foil until February 12.

A 2016 live set with this lineup, entitled Wow to the Liveness was quickly but quietly released to prior Kickstarter backers via digital download. It has yet to be released on any physical format.

== Style and lyrics ==
Steve Taylor & The Perfect Foil perform a modern and highly diverse style of alternative and punk rock. Goliath was described by critics as alternative, CCM, and minimalist pop punk, influenced by punk, new wave, disco, and classic rock and reminiscent of the music from the late-1980s and early 1990s. Some critics have noted that the band avoids both the "wall of metal" sound common to contemporary rock radio and the pop and worship music formulas favored by contemporary Christian artists. The band has been compared to The National and Taylor's previous, ill-fated venture, Chagall Guevara. On Wow to the Deadness, a collaboration with Daniel Smith, the band performed an intense, furious and chaotic punk rock style. Guitar World described the album as "Magazine covering the Godspell soundtrack or the Buzzcocks trading verses with the Free Design", and Popdose found the output similar to that of Touch and Go Records bands.

Lyrically, Steve Taylor & The Perfect Foil features Taylor's intelligent, satirical approach and clever wordplay, but with a more serious and enigmatic approach than that of his solo efforts in the 1980s. J. Edward Keyes of Wondering Sound described Taylor as favoring "the art-film, up-for-interpretation approach" that he took with Chagall Guevara, but still manages to be confrontational in his message.

== Discography ==
- Goliath (2014)
- Wow to the Deadness EP – as Steve Taylor & The Danielson Foil (2016)
- Wow to the Liveness live album - as Steve Taylor & The Danielson Foil (2016)

Music videos

Title	Year	Director
"Only a Ride"	2014	Steve Taylor, Seth Worley
"Standing in Line"	2014	Zach Hall
"Goliath"	2014	Jonathan Richter
"Moonshot"	2015	Matthew Sterling
"Wow to the Deadness"	2016	Matthew Sterling
"Nonchalant"	2016	Jeremy Gonzales
"Ecstatic Delight"	2020	Gunner Willis

== Members ==
- Steve Taylor – vocals
- Peter Furler – drums
- Jimmy Abegg – guitar
- John Mark Painter – bass, cello, saxophone, trumpets, horn
- Daniel Smith – guitar, vocals (2015–present)

Timeline
