= Goliath (Steve Taylor album) =

Studio album by Steve Taylor & The Perfect Foil
- Released: November 18, 2014
- Recorded: IHOF Studio (Nashville, Tennessee)
- Genre: CCM, alternative rock, new wave revival
- Length: 39:13
- Label: Splint Entertainment
- Producer: Steve Taylor, Danny Seim

Steve Taylor chronology
Liver (1995)	Goliath (2014)	Wow to the Deadness (2016)

Goliath is the sixth studio album by alternative rock singer Steve Taylor, and his first with the group Steve Taylor & The Perfect Foil, consisting of Taylor, Peter Furler, Jimmy Abegg and John Mark Painter. It was released by Splint Entertainment on November 18, 2014 and marks his first studio release since 1993's Squint.

== Background ==
Steve Taylor previously released the studio album Squint in 1993, after the breakup of his band Chagall Guevara, which enjoyed limited commercial success despite critical praise. Following Squint, Taylor retired from recording music as a solo artist, pursuing a career as a filmmaker, songwriter, and record producer. In 2010, Taylor started recording music again. In 2011, Peter Furler, former member of Newsboys, a band for which Taylor has produced and written, revealed in an interview that he, Taylor, Jimmy Abegg and John Mark Painter had started recording for a new project by Taylor. At that time, the band was still unnamed, and referred to itself as "Steve Taylor and Some Other Band". Under this name, the four artists appeared together on the song "Closer" from Furler's solo album On Fire. "A Life Preserved" was first heard on the soundtrack of the film Blue Like Jazz which Steve Taylor produced, wrote and directed.

== Reception ==
Professional ratings
Review scores
Source	Rating
Blurt Magazine	4/5 stars
CCM Magazine	5/5 stars
Cross Rhythms	10/10 squares
Jesus Freak Hideout	4.5/5 stars
New Release Tuesday	4/5 stars
The Phantom Tollbooth	4.5/5

Reviews for the album were effusive with praise with Popdose.com calling it "one of the best albums of the year."

Fred Mills, writing for Blurt Magazine, rewarding the project four stars out of five possible, lauds Taylor as "Sounding as if he's aged not one hour, he strides across the rock & roll arena every bit as vibrant on Goliath as in his prime." Imparting upon the album a five star rating, CCM Magazine's Andy Argyrakis, expresses "Even though it been 21 years since Steve Taylor's last solo album, he more than makes up for lost time with a searing collection of witty yet inspiring alt-rockers." For Jesus Freak Hideout, Bert Gangl awards the release four and a half stars surmising, "once these trifling arguments are laid to rest, what listeners are left with is quite simply a riveting, superbly-crafted work that, when it's all said and done, might just be Taylor's finest effort to date." In a four star rating, New Release Tuesday's Mary Nikkel implores, "This album will satisfy longtime Christian alternative rock supporters and pique the interest of a new generation longing for a little musical diversity." Bert Saraco, commenting for The Phantom Tollbooth in a four and a half clocks review, extolling "Steve Taylor and The Perfect Foil have unveiled Goliath to the world, and it's lived up to its legend."

== Music videos ==
Music videos were released for four of the tracks: "Only a Ride" which used footage from the trailer of the cult film Stunt Rock by Brian Trenchard-Smith, "Standing In Line", which consists entirely of footage from Jerzy Skolimowski's The Departure, an animated video for the title track "Goliath", and "Moonshot".

== Vinyl and cassette ==
Goliath's initial pressing was released in 2015 by Sounds Familyre Records in several different vinyl hues: transparent red (for kickstarter backers only), violet, pink, transparent green, transparent orange and transparent yellow. The album was also released on cassette tape in red, yellow, and "Splint blue".

== Track listing ==
All tracks lyrics by Steve Taylor, music by Steve Taylor and the Perfect Foil

1. "Only a Ride" – 2:23
2. "Double Negative" – 3:37
3. "Goliath" – 2:49
4. "Moonshot" – 2:57
5. "Rubberneck" – 2:49
6. "The Sympathy Vote" – 2:53
7. "Standing In Line" – 3:55
8. "In Layers" – 3:51
9. "Happy Go Lazy" – 3:34
10. "A Life Preserved" – 4:06
11. "Comedian" – 6:25

The deluxe edition, released in March 2015, includes three additional tracks:

1. "Am I in Sync? (Missing Link Version)" – 3:35
2. "Foils On 45" – 5:12
3. "Goliath: A Conversation with Donald Miller & Steve Taylor (Plus Secret Hidden Track)" – 15:28

== Personnel ==
- Jimmy Abegg - guitars, background vocals
- Peter Furler - drums, background vocals
- John Mark Painter - bass, cello, baritone saxophone, tenor saxophone, alto saxophone, French horn, trumpet and anything else laying around, background vocals
- Steve Taylor - vocals, one hand piano
- Danny Seim - additional keyboard flourishes, miscellaneous wizardry
- Lori Chaffer - guest vocals on "Comedian"
- Fleming McWilliams - guest vocals on "Goliath"
- Luke Yang - vibes
- Stephen Parolini: jenga
- Brendan Jones: breathalyzer
- Sam Sacco: zeitgeist
- Phillip Holmes: turbinado
- Tim and Val Hudson: vodaphone
- Steve Kellner: condoleeza

== Production notes ==
- Produced by Steve Taylor & The Perfect Foil
- Co-produced and mixed by Danny Seim
- Executive Producers: Larry & Nancy VanArendonk, Martin Turner, Rick Law, Richard Bickersteth
- Mastered by Bob Ludwig at Gateway Mastering
- Recorded by John Mark Painter at IHOF studio except Danny Seim overdubs recorded by Danny Seim
- Photography by Frank Ockenfels III
- Album design by Jimmy Abegg
- Insert illustration by Buddy Jackson
