= PFR (band) =

American Christian rock band

PFR (Pray for Rain)
- Origin: Minneapolis, Minnesota, US
- Genre: Christian rock
- Years active: 1989–1997, 2001, 2004, 2006, 2012–2013, 2022–present
- Labels: Vireo, Squint, Fuseic, Independent
- Members: Joel Hanson; Patrick Andrew; Mark Nash
- Website: PFR on Bandcamp PFR on Instagram PFR on Facebook

PFR is a Christian rock group from Minneapolis, Minnesota. Although the group initially disbanded in 1997, they periodically reunited from 2001 to 2013 and recorded two albums in that time. They reunited again in 2022. Their name was originally "Pray for Rain", but was changed to "PFR" to avoid a conflict with another musical group.

== History ==
PFR was founded in 1989 as the Joel Hanson Band by Joel Hanson, who was a camp counselor at Camp Shamineau, a Christian youth camp in Minnesota. In 1991, the band, then known as Inside Out, was signed to Brown Bannister's newly founded Vireo Records. After signing, Patrick Andrew suggested the band change the name to "Pray for Rain" after a line from a poem. In 1992, the band released Pray for Rain. Shortly after releasing the first album, an existing band (an instrumental group who did soundtrack work) known as Pray for Rain threatened a lawsuit, leading the band to settle on the name PFR. The first album was reissued with a slightly modified cover to reflect the change.

In 1993, PFR released their second album, Goldie's Last Day, whose title track was inspired by the passing of Patrick Andrew's pet golden retriever. Also that year, the band recorded a cover of "We Can Work It Out" by The Beatles with Phil Keaggy for the various artists tribute CD Come Together: America Salutes The Beatles.

PFR released their third album, Great Lengths, in 1994. They toured with Jars of Clay.

PFR released Them in 1996 and shortly afterward announced their breakup. In 1997, The Late Great PFR was released, a greatest hits album containing three new songs.

Over the next 5 years, the band reunited for an occasional benefit concert. In 2000, when Mark Nash was working as the A & R director of Squint Records, the band returned to the studio to contribute to Steve Taylor's Roaring Lambs compilation album, inspired by the book by Bob Briner. Working on the project inspired the band to sign to Taylor's Squint Records and record 2001's Disappear. The album did not gain much exposure, however, due to Squint Records selling to another company, which also displaced artists such as Chevelle and Sixpence None the Richer. Another casualty of the Squint shakeup was the PFR cover of Paul McCartney's "Wonderful Christmastime" recorded for a 2001 Squint Christmas compilation that was never released. However, the recording has been released digitally through the band's MySpace page. In 2002, PFR recorded a cover of "Livin' Thing", originally by Electric Light Orchestra.

In 2004 PFR released The Bookhouse Recordings, an album consisting of PFR classics rearranged, plus three new songs. The Bookhouse Recordings was recorded in one week at the end of August 2004 in Nashville, TN at Mark Nash's studio. This was the first album produced by the band alone, and features the song "Prayer For Beslan," a song mourning the terrorist attacks on a Russian school the same week the band was recording.The Bookhouse Recordings was released exclusively through Family Christian Stores, and was on the FUSEIC label started by Rick Altizer.

Joel Hanson released three solo albums, Broken (2001), Captured (2002), What If It Is (2009), and Let Me Tell You Everything (2017). Patrick Andrew formed Eager following the 1997 break-up of PFR, and was signed to Quaestar Mission Records, releasing a self-titled album in 1998, before Eager disbanded. In 2004, Andrew released a solo album, There and Then It's Gone.

In 2012, PFR reunited. Their first show was at The Church of the Open Door in Minneapolis-St. Paul, Minnesota on January 27, 2012. In December 2012, PFR released a 13-track live album entitled "Minneapolis". This album was made available exclusively as a digital download.

In 2013, PFR played the main stage at the Sonshine Festival in Willmar, Minnesota. A Kickstarter project was announced on October 2 Technical problems kept the project from being released on time and Joel Hanson announced on October 16, 2013 that the band had once again disbanded. He cited "personal things" with one of the band's members, and stated that these issues "need attention far more than our band does."

PFR reunited in late 2022 and is currently active. Their latest album, Target and the Arrow, was released September 22, 2026.

== Members ==
- Joel Hanson – guitar, vocals
- Patrick Andrew – bass guitar, vocals
- Mark Nash – drums

== Discography ==
=== Studio albums ===
| Title | Details | Peak chart positions | | |
| Title | Details | US | US Christ. | US Indie |
|---|---|---|---|---|
| Pray for Rain | Released: 1992; Label: Vireo Records/Sparrow Records; Formats: CD, cassette, digital download, streaming | — | — | — |
| Goldie's Last Day | Released: 1993; Label: Vireo/Sparrow; Formats: CD, cassette, digital download, streaming | — | 9 | — |
| Great Lengths | Released: December 27, 1994; Label: Vireo/Sparrow; Formats: CD, cassette, digital download, streaming | — | 3 | — |
| Them | Released: July 23, 1996; Label: Vireo/Sparrow; Formats: CD, cassette, digital download, streaming | 167 | 4 | — |
| Disappear | Released: July 3, 2001; Label: Squint Entertainment; Formats: CD, LP, digital download, streaming | — (Note: Disappear did not enter the Billboard 200, but peaked at number 28 on the Billboard Top Heatseekers.) | 16 | 17 |
| Target and the Arrow | Released: September 22, 2026; Label: Independent; Formats: Digital download, streaming | To be released | | |
"—" denotes a recording that did not chart or was not released in that territory.

=== Compilation appearances ===
- Come Together: America Salutes The Beatles (1995, Capitol)
- Roaring Lambs (2000, Squint)
- Lynne Me Your Ears: A Tribute to Jeff Lynne (2002, Not Lame)
- Very Best of PFR (2006, Sparrow) compilation
