= A Million Miles in a Thousand Years =

Book by Donald Miller

- Book cover
- Author: Donald Miller
- Audio read by: Donald Miller
- Language: English
- Genre: Autobiography
- Publisher: Thomas Nelson
- Publication date: September 28, 2009
- Publication place: United States
- Media type: Print, audible
- ISBN: 9780785213062
- OCLC: 417440903
- Dewey Decimal: 277.3/083092 B
- LC Class: BR1725.M4465 A3 2009

A Million Miles in a Thousand Years: What I Learned While Editing My Life (2009) is the sixth book by American autobiographer Donald Miller. It centers on the realizations that Miller came to while editing his critically and financially successful memoir Blue Like Jazz into a screenplay for a movie, directed by Steve Taylor.

== Background ==
The book came about through the circumstances following the publication of the Miller's earlier book Blue Like Jazz (2003). After its publication, Miller's life stalled and he fell into a depressive state. He had no desire to participate in the daily responsibilities of life and found himself questioning what his purpose was. While in this slump he was approached by two movie producers wanting to turn Blue Like Jazz into a movie.

== Synopsis ==
In writing the screenplay and editing Blue Like Jazz's events into movie dialogue, Miller learns about the elements of story and through this, learns more about his life as well as the life he wants to be living. He challenges himself by putting himself in situations that require more effort and sacrifice than he would typically feel comfortable exerting. Miller is shown transitioning from sleeping all day to riding his bike across America, from living in romantic daydreams to experiencing fearful encounters with love, from wasting his money to founding a non-profit with a passionate cause.

== Critical reception ==
A review on Publishers Weekly concluded that audiences who enjoyed Blue Like Jazz would "find here a somewhat more mature Miller, still funny as hell but more concerned about making a difference in the world." This sentiment was expressed by Denver Journal, whose critic agreed that when "Miller sets out to explore the implications and effects of [living a better narrative]," this "extended reflection on life as a story showcases a somewhat more mature Miller than that of his past books, although A Million Miles does retain much of his characteristic light and informal style." However, they found the structure distracting and disjointed, and were frustrated at what they called a "murkiness surrounding the book’s audience and purpose," since the book was devoid of theological, religious, or spiritual elements, nor did they view it as utilitarian.

== Citation ==
- Miller, Donald (2009). A Million Miles in a Thousand Years. Nashville: Thomas Nelson. ISBN 9780785213062. OCLC 417440903.
