= Searching for God Knows What =

- Author: Donald Miller
- Language: English
- Genre: Non-fiction, memoir
- Publisher: Thomas Nelson
- Publication date: October 13, 2004
- Publication place: United States
- Media type: Print (Paperback)
- Pages: 256 pp
- ISBN: 0-7852-6371-3

Searching for God Knows What is the third book by Donald Miller, published by Thomas Nelson in 2004. This work continues and expands many of the "Non-Religious Thoughts on Christian Spirituality" that appeared in his second book, Blue Like Jazz. In Searching for God Knows What, Miller primarily focuses on his view that Christianity should not be approached as a formulaic "how-to" guide or moral checklist, but rather as an invitation to enter the only relationship that can provide ultimate fulfillment.
