= Blue Like Jazz (film) =

- Theatrical release poster
- Directed by: Steve Taylor
- Screenplay by: Donald Miller; Ben Pearson; Steve Taylor
- Story by: Donald Miller
- Based on: Blue Like Jazz by Donald Miller
- Produced by: Steve Taylor; Coke Sams; J. Clark Gallivan
- Starring: Marshall Allman; Claire Holt; Jason Marsden; Tania Raymonde; Eric Lange; Justin Welborn
- Cinematography: Ben Pearson
- Edited by: Matt Sterling
- Music by: Danny Seim
- Production company: Ruckus Films
- Distributed by: Roadside Attractions
- Release dates: March 13, 2012 (SXSW); April 13, 2012 (United States)
- Running time: 107 minutes
- Country: United States
- Language: English
- Budget: $1.2 million
- Box office: $595,018

Blue Like Jazz is a 2012 American comedy-drama film directed by Steve Taylor and starring Marshall Allman, Claire Holt, and Tania Raymonde. It is based on Donald Miller's autobiographical book of the same name. Miller, Taylor, and Ben Pearson co-wrote the screenplay.

== Cast ==
- Marshall Allman as Donald "Don" Miller
- Claire Holt as Penny
- Jason Marsden as Kenny
- Tania Raymonde as Lauryn
- Eric Lange as The Hobo
- Justin Welborn as The Pope
- Natalia Dyer as Grace

== Production ==
Steve Taylor pitched the film to investors for four years until two investors, one from Seattle and one from Los Angeles, agreed to sign on for $250,000 each. The day before pre-production, the Los Angeles investor backed out and the film was scratched. When Donald Miller posted on his personal blog that the film was to be cancelled, however, two readers from Tennessee announced that they would raise the remaining required funds by way of the Kickstarter website.

According to Yancey Strickler, one of the founders of Kickstarter, only six films had ever raised more than $100,000 through the website as of May 2011. Taylor didn't believe that this fundraising effort would work, so he agreed to personally call and thank every donator of more than $10 if they met the target goal of $125,000. By October 2010, $345,992 had been donated through the website towards the film. Considering so much money had been raised through Kickstarter, the backer from Seattle matched that amount and contributed even more. Taylor was able to shoot the film for $750,000 and have an extra $500,000 left for post-production.

By May 2011, Taylor had personally called and thanked half of the 3,300 people who donated more than $10 through Kickstarter. He had called the remainder by April 2012. Blue Like Jazz: The Movie was the second most successful Kickstarter fundraiser in 2010.

Miller's 2009 book A Million Miles in a Thousand Years is based on his experience of revising his memoir into the screenplay for this film.

Filming took place in Nashville, Tennessee and Portland, Oregon.

== Release ==
The film had its world premiere as an official selection of the South by Southwest Film Festival on March 13, 2012. It was released in theaters on April 13, 2012 through Roadside Attractions. It was released on DVD and Blu-ray on August 7, 2012 in the United States and Canada.

== Reception ==
On the review aggregator website Rotten Tomatoes, 40% of 40 critics' reviews are positive. Metacritic, which uses a weighted average, assigned the film a score of 48 out of 100, based on 14 critics, indicating "mixed or average" reviews.

For The New York Times, Rachel Saltz wrote that "Don's crisis of faith, which should be the movie's core and engine, is never really convincing." In his review for San Francisco Chronicle, David Lewis concluded his comment by stating that "In a genre in which preaching to the choir seems to be the norm, this film is a welcome entry."
