= Cash cow (disambiguation) =

Cash cow is business jargon for a commodity that creates a large proportion or the majority of profits for a person or business.

Cash cow may also refer to:

- "Cash Cow", a song by We Are Scientists from their album With Love and Squalor
- "Cash Cow", a song by Steve Taylor on the album Squint
- "Cash Cow", an unreleased song by Skepta and Kanye West
- Cashcows, a 2005 series on BBC Radio 4
- The "Cash Cow", a character and competition to win money on the Australian morning show Sunrise
