= Roaring Lambs =

Compilation album by Various artists
- Released: May 30, 2000
- Studios: The Tracking Room, The White House, Ken's Gold Club, The Carport, Ocean Way Recording, Seventeen Grand Recording, Battery Studios, The Salt Mine and Dave's Extistential Waco Bus (Nashville, Tennessee); Dark Horse Recording, Sound Kitchen and Hound's Ear Studio (Franklin, Tennessee); Charlie Peacock Productions and The Art House (Bellevue, Tennessee); Sweet Tea (Oxford, Mississippi); Avatar (New York City, New York); The Grey Ghost (Bloomington, Indiana); Tom Lewis Studios (Atlanta, Georgia)
- Genre: Contemporary Christian music
- Label: Squint
- Producers: Steve Taylor; Various producers

Professional ratings
Review scores
Source	Rating
AllMusic	4/5 stars
Christianity Today	(favorable)
Jesus Freak Hideout	3/5 stars
The Phantom Tollbooth	3.5/5 stars

Roaring Lambs (released in 2000) is a collaborative album based on the book, Roaring Lambs: A Gentle Plan to Radically Change Your World, by Bob Briner. Conceived and directed Dave Palmer, and produced by Steve Taylor, the recording includes a number of CCM artists' musical interpretations of Briner's message about the need to have a positive impact on their culture. The work was nominated for three GMA Dove awards, winning for "Recorded Music Packaging of the Year". Critical reception of the album was mixed, but it was noted for its eclectic artist pairings.

== Track listing ==
1. "Headstrong"; performed by Jars of Clay (Dan Haseltine, Charlie Lowell, Stephen Mason, Matt Odmark) - 3:32
2. "Salt and Light"; performed by Ashley Cleveland and Michael Tait (Ashley Cleveland, Chad Cromwell, Kenny Greenberg, Michael Rhodes) - 4:04
3. "Out There"; performed by Steven Curtis Chapman and Michael W. Smith (Bob Briner, Steven Curtis Chapman, Michael W. Smith) - 4:18
4. "One Thing"; performed by Ginny Owens and Brent Bourgeois (Brent Bourgeois) - 3:25
5. "Shortstop"; performed by Steve Taylor (Steve Taylor) - 2:59
6. 'Kingdom Come"; performed by PFR (Patrick Andrew, Joel Hanson, John Mark Painter) - 4:56
7. "'Akehlulek' Ubaba (With God Everything is Possible)"; performed by Ladysmith Black Mambazo and Charlie Peacock (Joseph Shabalala) - 5:16
8. "Touch"; performed by Delirious? (Stuart Garrard, Martin Smith) - 4:15
9. "Daisies and Roses"; performed by Burlap to Cashmere (Steven Delopoulos) - 3:38
10. "Goodbye"; performed by Over the Rhine (Karin Bergquist, Linford Detweiler) - 5:30
11. "Wondering Where the Lions Are"; performed by Bill Mallonee and Vigilantes of Love (Bruce Cockburn) - 3:30
12. "The Ground You Shook"; performed by Sixpence None the Richer (Matt Slocum) - 4:19

== Personnel ==
Vocalists

- Dan Haseltine (1)
- Ashley Cleveland and Michael Tait (2)
- Steven Curtis Chapman and Michael W. Smith (3)
- Ginny Owens and Brent Bourgeois (4)
- Steve Taylor (5)
- Joel Hanson and Patrick Andrew (6)
- Ladysmith Black Mambazo (7)
- Martin Smith (8)
- Steven Delopoulos and John Philippidis (9)
- Karin Bergquist (10)
- Bill Mallonee (11)
- Leigh Nash (12)

Musicians

- Charlie Lowell – keyboards (1), percussion (1), backing vocals (1)
- Jamie Kenney – keyboards (3)
- Brent Bourgeois – acoustic piano (4), keyboards (4)
- Blair Masters – keyboards (6)
- Charlie Peacock – acoustic piano (7)
- Tony Miracle – programming (7)
- Tim Jupp – keyboards (8)
- Linford Detweiler – acoustic piano (10), organ (10), "outer space" keyboard (10), string arrangements (10)
- Jerry Dale McFadden – Hammond B3 organ (12)
- Stephen Mason – guitars (1), percussion (1), backing vocals (1)
- Matt Odmark – guitars (1), percussion (1), backing vocals (1)
- Kenny Greenberg – guitars (2)
- Steven Curtis Chapman – acoustic guitar (3)
- Jerry McPherson – guitars (3, 5)
- Chris Rodriguez – guitars (4), backing vocals (4)
- Joel Hanson – guitars (6)
- Stuart Garrard – lead guitar (8), backing vocals (8)
- Martin Smith – guitars (8)
- Steven Delopoulos – acoustic guitar (9)
- Mike Ernest – acoustic guitar (9)
- John Philippidis – guitars (9)
- Jack Henderson – electric guitars (10)
- Bill Mallonee – guitars (11), harmonica (11)
- Sean Kelly – electric guitars (12), high-strung guitar (12)
- Matt Slocum – acoustic guitar (12), high-strung guitar (12)
- Aaron Sands – bass (1)
- Michael Rhodes – bass (2)
- John Mark Painter – bass (3, 5), acoustic piano (5), horns (5), string arrangements (6)
- Jimmie Lee Sloas – bass (4), other instruments (6)
- Patrick Andrew – bass (6)
- James Genus – bass (7)
- Jon Thatcher – bass (8)
- Roby Guarnera – bass (9)
- Byron House – bass (10)
- Jacob Bradley – bass (11), backing vocals (11)
- Justin Cary – bass (12)
- Ben Mize – drums (1)
- Chad Cromwell – drums (2)
- Steve Brewster – drums (3)
- Chris McHugh – drums (4)
- Dale Baker – drum corps (5), drums (12), percussion (12)
- Mark Nash – drums (6), tambourine (6)
- Stewart Smith – drums (8)
- Teddy Pagano – drums (9)
- Don Heffington – drums (10), percussion (10)
- Kevin Heuer – drums (11)
- Eric Darken – percussion (3)
- Don Alias – percussion (7)
- Kim Thomas – autoharp (6)
- Jacob Lawson – fiddle (12)
- The Henry Twins – strings (1)
- Tom Howard – string arrangements and conductor (4)
- The Nashville String Machine – strings (4)
- John Catchings – cello (6, 8, 10)
- Kristin Wilkinson – viola (8, 10)
- David Davidson – violin (6, 8, 10)
- David Angell – violin (8, 10)
- Vicki Hampton – backing vocals (2)
- Michael W. Smith – backing vocals (3)
- Marabeth Jordan – backing vocals (4)
- Dave Perkins – vocal coach (5)
- John Butler and Jay Swartzendruber – baseball coaches (5)
- Terri Templeton – harmony vocals (10)
- Emmylou Harris – guest vocals (12)

== Production ==
- Dennis Herring – producer (1)
- Chad Cromwell, Kenny Greenberg and Michael Rhodes – producers (2)
- Steve Taylor – producer (3, 5, 8)
- Brent Bourgeois and Chris Rodriguez – producers (4)
- Jimmie Lee Sloas – producer (6)
- Charlie Peacock – producer (7)
- Delirious? – producers (8)
- Steve Delopoulos – producer (9)
- Linford Detweiler and Dave Perkins – producers (10)
- Bill Mallonee – producer (11)
- Matt Slocum – producer (12)
- Dave Palmer – album conception and direction
- Karinne Caulkins – art direction, design
- Buddy Jackson – art direction
- Ben Pearson – photography

Technical

- Richard Hasal – engineer (1)
- Dennis Herring – engineer (1), mixing (1)
- Justin Niebank – engineer (2), mixing (2)
- Russ Long – engineer (3, 5, 8, 9), mixing (3, 5, 10)
- David Schober – engineer (4, 6), mixing (4), additional engineer (5)
- Richie Biggs – engineer (6, 7), mixing (7)
- Shane D. Wilson – mixing (6)
- Dan Gellert – bass and percussion recording (7)
- Martin Smith – mixing (8)
- Tom Lewis – engineer (11), mixing (11)
- Marc Chevalier – engineer (12), mixing (12)
- Clay Jones – additional mix assistant (1)
- Mills Logan – additional engineer (2)
- Kip Kubin – additional engineer (7)
- Tony Miracle – additional engineer (7)
- John Geiss – assistant engineer (3), mix assistant (3)
- Chris Hauser – assistant engineer (3, 5, 9), mix assistant (3)
- Ed Simonton – assistant engineer (3), mix assistant (3)
- Nathan Zwald – assistant engineer (3, 9), mix assistant (3)
- Melissa Mattey – assistant engineer (4), mix assistant (4)
- Greg Fogie – assistant engineer (5, 12), mix assistant (12)
- Anthony Rutolo – recording assistant (7)
- Pat Thrall – recording assistant (7)
- Bobby Morse – assistant engineer (9)
- Gil Gowing – digital editing (7)
- Charlie Peacock – digital editing (7)
