= Eager (band) =

American Christian music band

- Origin: Nashville, Tennessee
- Years active: 1995–1998
- Label: Warner Bros. Records
- Past members: Patrick Andrew, Greg Pope, Mark Kloos, Paul Eckberg

Eager was a band formed by Patrick Andrew, formerly of the band PFR. Patrick began forming the new band with Greg Pope in 1995. Greg, who was also a songwriter, had been touring with PFR as a backup guitarist. To quell rumors of the unannounced but impending PFR breakup, Patrick publicly explained the new band as just "a side project". The two songwriters recruited drummer Paul Eckberg in Minneapolis, Minnesota, and the three moved to Nashville, Tennessee in the fall of 1996. They quickly enlisted Mark Kloos from Raleigh, North Carolina, who was Greg's former bandmate in Apple Green and The Greg Pope Band.

The group recorded a self-titled album in early 1997, which Jimmie Lee Sloas produced. It was released that fall. The band continued touring and playing live shows until disbanding in mid-1998.

== Members ==
- Patrick Andrew - Vocals, bass
- Greg Pope - Vocals, guitar
- Mark Kloos - Guitar
- Paul Eckberg - Drums, percussion

== Genre ==
Combines Christian with Pop & Contemporary.

== Discography ==
Eager (1997, Warner Bros. Records, Questar/Mission Records)
