= Hoodwinked! (soundtrack) =

2005 film soundtrack album

Hoodwinked! (Original Motion Picture Soundtrack)

Soundtrack album by John Mark Painter
- Released: December 13, 2005
- Venues: Nashville, Tennessee, U.S.
- Studios: Ocean Way Studios; IHOF Studios
- Genre: Soundtrack
- Length: 48:35
- Label: Rykodisc
- Producers: Todd Edwards; John Mark Painter

John Mark Painter chronology
Punchinello and the Most Marvelous Gift (2004)	Hoodwinked! (Original Motion Picture Soundtrack) (2005)	The Second Chance (2006)

Hoodwinked! (Original Motion Picture Soundtrack) is a soundtrack album by John Mark Painter for the film of the same name, recorded and mixed at Ocean Way Studios and IHOF Studios (both in Nashville, Tennessee) and released on December 13, 2005 by Rykodisc.

== Development ==
The soundtrack to Hoodwinked! was composed by John Mark Painter, who along with his wife Fleming McWilliams, constituted the rock duo Fleming and John in the 1990s. The Edwards brothers were fans of the group and first met Painter while Cory was performing in an animated film on which Painter served as the composer. The score was inspired by music from the 1960s. The soundtracks of Planet of the Apes (1968), Dark Shadows (1966–1971) and The Untouchables (1987) have been cited as influences, as well as the works of Henry Mancini. It was recorded in Nashville, Tennessee, where Kristin Wilkinson served as the orchestrator and conductor.

In an effort to appeal to older audience members, Todd Edwards chose to replace parts of Painter's score with original rock music. From this came the song "Little Boat", written and sung by Daniel Rogers, who had composed Edwards' first film Chillicothe. "Runaway" was written by Joshua J. Greene, a friend of the Edwards brothers', who also provided the voice of Jimmy Lizard in the film. "The Real G", sung by Cory Edwards and "Bounce", sung by Todd Collins were both written by Painter and Cory Edwards. "Blow Your House Down" was performed by the Filipino band Pupil and written by their lead singer Ely Buendia.

Cory Edwards was willing to include the Foo Fighters' song "All My Life". The Foo Fighters decided against it due to having a new album coming out and having no enthusiasm about using their old hit, afraid it was getting overused. No Foo Fighters song was included on the soundtrack.

Todd Edwards wrote nine original songs for the film and sung four of them: "Critters Have Feelings", "Tree Critter", "Eva Deanna", and "Glow". "Eva Deanna" was written about a day that he and his wife spent at the zoo with their niece, the daughter of associate producer Katie Hooten. "Glow" was written about the Edwards siblings' grandmother, Vera, who had died a few years earlier. "Great Big World" was sung by Anne Hathaway and replaced another song called "Woods Go-Round", which Edwards considered too childish and described as being "in the vein of Saturday morning cartoons." This change required the scene to be re-animated and re-cut. "Be Prepared" was sung by Benjy Gaither and developed out of a practicality; the filmmakers wanted to introduce Japeth while the character is rocking back and forth on his horns, as though the horns are a rocking chair. However, they realized that this would make the horns too big to fit in a minecart later on in the film. As a solution, they came up with the gag of having the character switch his horns several times, and this led to the song's concept. McWilliams joined Jim Belushi to sing "The Schnitzel Song" and Painter asked his longtime friend Ben Folds to sing "Red is Blue", a selection strongly advocated for by Edwards. Folds was working on a new album at the time, but a year after the proposal, found the opportunity to record the song and compose a piano arrangement for it as well. "Top of the Woods" was sung by Andy Dick and was originally composed to be slow-paced. The recording of Dick's performance was sped up though at the suggestion of Ralf Palmer, a prolific animator and friend of producer Sue Bea Montgomery.

The Japanese dub has its own theme song Daisuki!Happy end by Yuko Hara.

== Track listing ==
No.	Title	Length
1.	"Into the Book" (performed by John Mark Painter)	0:33
2.	"Great Big World" (performed by Anne Hathaway)	1:57
3.	"Critters Have Feelings" (performed by Todd Edwards and Creatures of Habit)	3:34
4.	"Nicky Intro" (performed by John Mark Painter)	0:16
5.	"Red is Blue" (performed by Ben Folds)	4:21
6.	"Be Prepared" (performed by Benjy Gaither)	2:46
7.	"Go Flippers" (performed by John Mark Painter)	0:10
8.	"Little Boat" (performed by Daniel Rogers)	4:38
9.	"Red/Wolf Stare-Down" (performed by John Mark Painter)	0:11
10.	"Runaway" (performed by Joshua J. Greene)	3:01
11.	"The Schnitzel Song" (performed by Fleming McWilliams and Jim Belushi)	2:04
12.	"Tree Critter" (performed by Todd Edwards and Creatures of Habit)	2:54
13.	"Three G's" (performed by John Mark Painter)	0:23
14.	"The Real G" (performed by Cory Edwards)	2:44
15.	"Blow Your House Down (Instrumental Version)" (performed by Pupil)	1:02
16.	"Hoodwinked Theme (Granny Techno Mix)" (performed by John Mark Painter)	0:55
17.	"Eva Deanna" (performed by Todd Edwards)	1:24
18.	"Chopping for Actors" (performed by John Mark Painter)	0:26
19.	"Glow" (performed by Todd Edwards)	1:17
20.	"Nicky Knows" (performed by John Mark Painter)	3:19
21.	"Top of the Woods" (performed by Andy Dick)	2:41
22.	"Delivery Girl" (performed by John Mark Painter)	0:19
23.	"Lair Rescue" (performed by John Mark Painter)	0:32
24.	"Cable Car Rescue/End of the Line" (performed by John Mark Painter)	1:36
25.	"Bounce" (performed by Todd Collins)	3:51
26.	"Bossa for Boingo" (performed by John Mark Painter)	1:20
27.	"Hoodwinked Theme (Surfer Version)" (performed by John Mark Painter)	0:21
Total length:		48:35

== Release ==
Due to legal wrangles, the soundtrack's CD wasn't available for about 4 years after the film's theatrical release, but as of the end of 2009, the soundtrack's CD is again for sale. The soundtrack was also re-released on iTunes in January 2010.

== Reception ==
AllMusic wrote "This soundtrack to the animated Hollywood re-imagining of the popular Little Red Riding Hood children's story is a winning combination of classic movie orchestration and early-21st-century flourishes." Zooglobble wrote "You don't need to have enjoyed the movie—or even to have seen the movie—to enjoy the Hoowinked soundtrack (though it'll add a little bit to your enjoyment). I definitely recommend this album, but it's not so much for your kids as it is for yourself. Your kids are likely to get tired of it long before you do." John Hazelton of Screen International wrote "The dozen or so catchyoriginal songs, mostly performed by co-writer-director Todd Edwards or voicecast members, are another asset. Written in styles ranging from rock throughcountry to hip-hop, some—like the very funny bluegrass numbers sung by ablind goat—are purely comic, others fairly straight."

== Personnel ==
Credits adapted from liner notes:

- Music composer, recording, mixing – John Mark Painter, Todd Edwards
- Album producer – John Mark Painter, Todd Edwards
- Engineer – Joe Costa
- Mastering – Marc Chevalier
- Art direction and design – Hoyt Vitale, Paul Grosso
- Executive producer – John McCullough, Michael Babcock, Todd Edwards
