= J. Don Ferguson =

American actor

- Born: November 21, 1933; Knoxville, Tennessee
- Died: October 1, 2008 (aged 74); Savannah, Georgia
- Other name: Don Ferguson
- Occupations: Actor, Television actor
- Years active: 1974–2006

J. Don Ferguson (November 21, 1933 – October 1, 2008), sometimes credited as Don Ferguson, was an American character actor who appeared in feature films and television programs. He was a prominent stage actor in Savannah, Georgia, regional stage theater productions. Ferguson also was an NCAA basketball tournament referee for ten years, and this experience led to his being cast in several related acting roles.

== Filmography ==
=== Film ===
- The Longest Yard (1974) as Football Referee (uncredited)
- Gator (1976) as Bartender
- The Lincoln Conspiracy (1977) as Lt. Luther Baker
- Our Winning Season (1978) as Coach Michael Murphy
- Norma Rae (1979) as Peter Gallat
- The Prize Fighter (1979) as Referee #1
- Little Darlings (1980) as Husband
- The Long Riders (1980) as Preacher
- The Night the Lights Went Out in Georgia (1981) as Hawkins
- The Loveless (1981) as Tarver
- Sharky's Machine (1981) as Rally Emcee
- Tennessee Stallion (1982) as Fred
- The American Snitch (1983) as Sonny Barton
- Tank (1984) as Gov. Harold R. Sims, Tennessee
- Kidco (1984) as TV Show Announcer
- Maximum Overdrive (1986) as Andy
- Running Mates (1986) as Robert Adams
- Date with an Angel (1987) as Harlan Rafferty
- Final Cut (1988) as Sheriff Thompson
- Fast Food (1989) as Dean Witler
- The Return of Swamp Thing (1989) as Bob
- Freejack (1992) as Promoter
- My Cousin Vinny (1992) as Guard #1
- The Program (1993) as Referee
- Radioland Murders (1994) as Johnny Ace, Hard Boiled Dick (as Don Ferguson)
- The War (1994) as Mine Foreman
- Something to Talk About (1995) as Announcer
- Eddie (1996) as Game Referee
- Fled (1996) as Chairman
- Raney (1997) as Thurman Daddy Bell
- I Know What You Did Last Summer (1997) as MC
- Major League: Back to the Minors (1998) as Mick the Umpire
- Remember the Titans (2000) as Executive Director
- The Legend of Bagger Vance (2000) as Citizen
- Movievoyeur.com (2000) as Sheriff Ames
- The Substitute: Failure Is Not an Option (2001) as Colonel Teague
- Juwanna Mann (2002) as UBA Referee
- The Second Chance (2006) as Jeremiah Jenkins (final film role)

=== Television ===
- F. Scott Fitzgerald and 'The Last of the Belles' (1974, TV Movie) as Man in Speakeasy
- The Greatest Gift (1974, TV Movie) as Jim Friedlin
- Summer of My German Soldier (1978, TV Movie) as Mr. Jackson
- I Know Why the Caged Bird Sings (1979, TV Movie) as Mr. Donleavy
- Barnaby Jones (1980, TV Series) as Ross Chapman
- When the Circus Came to Town (1981, TV Movie) as Andre Probashka
- Murder in Coweta County (1983, TV Movie) as Jim Hillin
- Windmills of the Gods (1988, TV Series) as Ian Villers
- Unconquered (1989, TV Movie) as Mr. Woods
- Traveling Man (1989, TV Movie) as Riker
- In the Heat of the Night (1989–1993, TV Series) as Rev. Winchell / Kevin Riley / Rev. Kenneth Haskell
- Murder in Mississippi (1990, TV Movie)
- When Will I Be Loved? (1990, TV Movie) as Man at Bar #1
- In the Line of Duty: Manhunt in the Dakotas (1991, TV Movie) as James Blasingame
- Nightmare in Columbia County (1991, a.k.a. Victim of Beauty, TV Movie) as Bob Smith
- In the Line of Duty: Street War (1992, TV Movie) as Gun Shop Owner
- I'll Fly Away (1993, TV Series) as Harry Saunders
- Linda (1993, TV Movie) as Davis Vernon
- A Kiss to Die For (1993, TV Movie) as Harold Graham
- Matlock (1993–1994, TV Series) as Reverend Wesley Masters / Mr. Walters / Mr. Bostwick
- Big Dreams & Broken Hearts: The Dottie West Story (1995, TV Movie) as Wendy Blevins
- From the Earth to the Moon (1998, TV Mini-Series) as Senator Stephen Young
