= On Fire (Peter Furler album) =

Studio album by Peter Furler
- Released: 21 June 2011
- Recorded: 2010–2011
- Genres: Contemporary Christian music, pop rock
- Length: 39:49
- Label: Sparrow
- Producer: Peter Furler: Seth Mosley

Peter Furler chronology
On Fire (2011)	Sun and Shield (2014)

Singles from On Fire
- 1. "Reach" Released: May 2011; 2. "Matter of Faith" Released: November 2011; 3. "I'm Alive" Released: September 2012

On Fire is the first studio album released by Australian Christian musician Peter Furler. It marks Furler's solo debut after his departure from Newsboys in 2009. After some date changes, the album was finally released 21 June 2011.

== Critical reception ==
Professional ratings
Review scores
Source	Rating
AllMusic	3.5/5 stars
Alpha Omega News	A
CCM Magazine	3/5 stars
Christian Music Review	93%
Christian Music Zine	4/5 stars
Christian Rock 20	5/5 stars
Christianity Today	3/5 stars
CM Addict	4.5/5 stars
Cross Rhythms	9/10 stars
HM	3/5 stars
Indie Vision Music	3/5 stars
Jesus Freak Hideout	3.5/5 stars
Louder Than the Music	4.5/5 stars
New Release Tuesday	4.5/5 stars
The Phantom Tollbooth	3.5/5 stars

On Fire garnered generally positive reception from music critics. Peter Timmis of Cross Rhythms rated the album a nine out of ten, stating that the album is "an uplifting and intelligent debut that seems sure to propel Furler to the very top of the CCM tree." Matt Conner of CCM Magazine rated the album three stars out of five, and according to him "It doesn't all work, but it's always interesting." At HM, Dan MacIntosh rated the album three stars out of five, saying that "Some are quite good", however he says some songs are "bad idea[s]." Andy Argyrakis of Christianity Today rated the album three stars, stating that "While Furler's creative spark and satire may have softened, he's still a catchy songwriter", yet on this release "Everything's likeable but nothing's remarkable". At Allmusic, William Ruhlmann rated the album three-and-a-half stars out of five, saying that the release "gets Furler's solo career off with a bang".

The Phantom Tollbooth's Bert Saraco rated the album three-and-a-half tocks out of five, stating that the release "is not quite at the level of either of those two albums", which are "at least not on a consistent level" with Go and In the Hands of God, but did write that the album "certainly shows the spark, enthusiasm, and charisma that helped propel those projects along." At New Release Tuesday, Sarah Fine rated the album four-and-a-half stars out of five, saying that "this is a fun and fast paced album." Cimarron Hatch of Indie Vision Music rated the album three stars, writing that some of the lyricism is commonplace, but the release contains a "wonderful message". At Worship Leader, Andrea Hunter gave a positive review, writing that the music is "Scripturally connected, encouraging, confrontive, hope-filled music to dance to and bounce you out of despair"; however, she did write that "It would be interesting to hear the serious lyrics in a more pared down and intimate setting, as the massive quantity of effects tend to obscure the message and emotions."

At Christian Music Zine, Tyler Hess rated the album four stars out of five, and according to him "Going Public, Take Me To Your Leader and 'Step Up to the Microphone' were the golden years for the band, so to hear something that brings me back to that era is a more than welcome album." Louder Than the Music's Jono Davies rated the album four-and-a-half stars out of five, writing that "Now with a brand new era of anthemic songs and sounds, Peter Furler is definitely On Fire." At Christian Music Review, Jay Wright rated the album a 93-percent, stating that "as similar as this project may be to Newsboys, it is different as well, in the fact that it tells Peter’s story of finding freedom, and it contains a catchy techno sound that I found to be very enjoyable", and says the production "added a ton to this project." Peter Gibson of Christian Rock 20 rated the album a perfect five stars, writing that this is "an excellent album." At CM Addict, Kevin Thorson rated the album four-and-a-half stars out of five, saying that this is a "superb album" that showcases "Furler's twenty years of musical genius is showing and that's why it's such a good album." Rob Snyder of Alpha Omega News graded the album an A, and according to him this album is "A welcome return."

== Commercial performance ==
For the Billboard charting week of 9 July 2011, On Fire was the No. 91 most sold album in the entirety of the United States via the Billboard 200, and it was the No. 2 most sold in the Christian Albums market.

== Track listing ==
No.	Title	Writer(s)	Length
1.	"I'm Alive"	Peter Furler, Steve Taylor	3:47
2.	"Reach" (featuring Phil Joel)	Seth Mosley, Juan Otero, Andrew Fromm	3:49
3.	"Glory to the King"	Furler, Mosley, Taylor	4:17
4.	"Never Ending Love Song"	Furler, Wes Willis, Jason Ingram, Kevin Huguley	3:33
5.	"Matter of Faith"	Furler, Mosley	3:58
6.	"All in Your Head"	Furler, Taylor	3:48
7.	"Closer" (featuring Steve Taylor & Some Other Band)	Furler, Taylor, John Painter, Jimmy Abegg	3:18
8.	"Faster and Louder"	Furler, Taylor, Mosley	3:14
9.	"Psalm 23" (featuring Andy Hunter)	Furler	3:17
10.	"Hold On"	Furler, Mosley, Ben Glover	3:39
11.	"Greater Is He" (featuring Phil Joel & Bill Furler)	Furler, Mosley	3:12

Bonus Tracks Edition
No.	Title	Length
12.	"Water to Wine" (featuring Andy Hunter)	3:26
13.	"I'm Alive" (Andy Hunter Remix)	4:41
14.	"Reach" (Acoustic)	3:04
15.	"Matter of Faith" (Acoustic)	4:02
16.	"Glory to the King" (Acoustic)	4:23

== Personnel ==
- Peter Furler – vocals, backing vocals, keyboards, programming, guitars, bass, drums, percussion
- Seth Mosley – keyboards, programming, guitars, bass, backing vocals
- Andy Hunter – additional programming (9), programming (12)
- Jimmy Abegg – guitars
- John Mark Painter – bass
- Steve Taylor & Some Other Band – instruments (7)
- Phil Joel – backing vocals, vocals (2, 11)
- Summer Furler – additional backing vocals
- Celi Mosley – additional backing vocals
- Bill Furler – Scripture reading (11)

=== Production ===
- Peter Furler – producer
- Seth Mosley – producer
- John Mark Painter – additional producer
- Steve Taylor – additional producer
- Jimmy Abegg – additional producer (7)
- F. Reid Shippen – mixing
- Erik "Keller" Jahner – mix assistant
- Andy Hunter – remixing (13)
- Dan Shike – mastering at Tone and Volume Mastering (Nashville, Tennessee)
- Katie Moore – design
- David Dobson – design, photography

== Charts ==
Chart (2011)	Peak position
US Billboard 200	91
US Top Christian Albums (Billboard)	2

== Music videos ==
- Reach
- I'm Alive
- Matter of Faith
