= Bernie McInerney =

American actor (born 1936)

- Born: December 4, 1936 (age 88); Wilmington, Delaware, U.S.
- Occupation: Actor
- Spouse: Leilani
- Children: 3

Bernie McInerney (born December 4, 1936) is an American character actor.

== Personal life ==
McInerney grew up in Delaware where his father was an auditor with the DuPont Company. McInerney came to acting at a young age, announcing the World Series defeat of the 1946 Boston Red Sox from his bicycle seat as he rode through his neighborhood. He thought he would become a sports announcer before he was "sucked into theatre, and then there was no turning back." He attended the University of Delaware and was an active member of E-52 Student Theatre. He graduated in 1959. He currently lives in Rutherford, New Jersey, with his second wife, Leilani (an opera singer), their son Danny, and their dog Buddy. Another son, Bernard, lives with his family in Virginia. His daughter, Kathleen, is a voice actress living with her daughter in New York City.

== Film appearances ==
Zharko's Doctor Weber, King of the Gypsies 1978; St. Paul Buyer, So Fine 1981; Johnson, Trading Places 1983; Dr. Neuman, The Natural 1984; Detective Tom Green, Invasion U.S.A. 1985; Walter, Suspect, 1987; Harland Fitzgerald, Masquerade 1988; Dr. Stuhlberg, The Mighty Quinn 1989; First policeman, See You in the Morning 1989; Dr. Cornfield, See No Evil, Hear No Evil 1989; Clifford Worthy, Livin' Large! 1991; Minister, Sliver 1993; Congressman Millman, The American President 1995; Client at Cutty Ayres, The Associate 1996; Carey, The Peacemaker 1997; Headmaster Ryan, Academy Boyz 1997; Mahoney, The Tavern 1999; Professor Cummings, Nola 2003; Judge Carl, Duane Hopwood 2005; Four Lane Highway 2005; Duff Krindel, The Great New Wonderful 2005; Mr. Harrison, The Thing About My Folks 2005; James Lamson, Dan in Real Life 2007; Father Joe, Pistol Whipped 2008; Old Man on Scooter, Paul Blart: Mall Cop, 2009

== Television appearances ==
=== Daytime series ===
Mark Faraday, The Edge of Night 1975; Dr. Will Vernon, One Life to Live 1977; Rex Whitmore, As the World Turns; Miniseries: Dr. Bowles, The Kennedys of Massachusetts 1990.

=== Television movies ===
Manager, Hustling 1975; Sully, Johnny We Hardly Knew Ye 1977; Team doctor, Fighting Back: The Story of Rocky Bleier 1980; Dr. Miller, Out of the Darkness 1985; Day One 1989; Clines, The Jackie Presser Story 1992.

=== Television pilots ===
Cop, Ethel is an Elephant 1980; Lawyer, O'Malley 1983.

=== Additional appearances ===
Richards on Ryan's Hope; George Caswell on The Hamptons; Judge Kreinik on Feds; Police Story; Eischied; The Andros Targets; All My Children; Sanctuary of Fear; Rocking-Chair Rebellion; Guiding Light; Today's FBI; Search for Tomorrow; and Another World.

=== Episodic television ===
Sam Findley, White Knight, Spenser: For Hire 1986; Mr. Hartzman, "Hired Wife", Kate & Allie 1987; Judge Michael Callahan, "The Serpent's Tooth", Law & Order, 1991; Judge Michael Callahan, "Renunciation", Law & Order 1991, "Prince of Darkness", Law & Order 1992; "American Dream", Law & Order 1993; Stan Holzman, "Whistle Stop", L.A. Law 1994; Dr. Denard, "Ultimatums Are Us" 1994; Professor Hogan, "Death Be Proud", Chicago Hope 1994; Judge Michael Callahan, "Rage", Law & Order 1995; Father Ralph Thomas, "Absolute Zero", Nowhere Man 1995; Central Park West 1996; Judge Michael Callahan, "Showtime", Law & Order 1997; Judge Michael Callahan, "Hunters", Law & Order 1999; Dr. Zorters, "Jerri's Burning Issue", Strangers with Candy 2000; Judge Michael Callahan, "Ego", Law & Order 2001; Professor Murphy "Wasichu", Law & Order: Criminal Intent 2006; Catholic Priest, "St. Patrick's Day", 30 Rock 2012.

== Stage appearances ==
Russian ambassador, Romanoff and Juliet, Adelphi Summer Playhouse, Garden City, NY, 1960; James, That Championship Season, Booth Theatre, New York City, 1972; Garrick, 1974; M.P. officer, Streamers, Mitzi E. Newhouse Theater, New York City, 1976; Wally, Losing Time, Manhattan Theatre Club, New York City, 1979; John Joseph "JoJo" Finn, Curse of an Aching Heart, New York City, 1982; Carl Evert, Digby, Manhattan Theatre Club Stage I, New York City, 1985; Endicott, The Front Page, Vivian Beaumont Theater, New York City, 1986–1987; Reverend, Dr. Buchanan, and Papa, Summer and Smoke, Criterion Theatre, New York City, 1996; Judge and pharmacist, Everybody's Ruby, Joseph Papp Public Theater/Anspacher Theatre, New York City, 1999; The Rainmaker, Brooks Atkinson Theatre, New York City, 1999–2000, The Rainmaker, Skirball Cultural Center, Los Angeles, 2000; Jimmy Conway, A Letter from Ethel Kennedy, MCC Theater, New York City, 2002; Jim, Humble Boy, Manhattan Theatre Club Stage I, 2003

Also appeared as Ted Quinn, The American Clock, Clurman Theatre and Spoleto Festival, Charleston, SC; Fran Hogan, Father Dreams, Ensemble Studio Theatre, New York City; Petruchio, The Taming of the Shrew, The White House, Washington, DC; How He Lied to Her Husband and Winners, both Roundabout Theatre, New York City; and in The Welsh Plays and New England both Manhattan Theatre Club;

== Major tours ==
- Harry, Company
- James, That Championship Season
