= Wow to the Deadness =

EP by Steve Taylor & The Danielson Foil
- Released: February 5, 2016
- Recorded: June 8–11, 2015
- Studios: Electrical Audio, Chicago, United States
- Genre: Punk rock
- Length: 15:13
- Labels: Splint, Sounds Familyre
- Producer: Steve Albini

Steve Taylor & The Perfect Foil chronology
Goliath (2014)	Wow to the Deadness (2016)	Wow to the Liveness (2016)

Danielson chronology
Solid Gold Heart (2014)	Wow to the Deadness (2016)	Wow to the Liveness (2016)

Wow to the Deadness is an EP by Steve Taylor & The Danielson Foil, a temporary collaboration between the supergroup Steve Taylor & The Perfect Foil and Daniel Smith of Danielson. Recorded in 2015 at Electrical Audio in Chicago, Illinois, and produced by Steve Albini, the EP was released on February 5, 2016, through Steve Taylor's Splint Entertainment and Smith's Sounds Familyre Records.

== Background and recording ==
During the promotional tour for the album Goliath in 2014, Steve Taylor & The Perfect foil were supported by Danielson. The idea of a collaboration between the two groups emerged, and in June 2015, when the tour came through Chicago, Daniel Smith of Danielson joined Steve Taylor & The Perfect Foil in a collaborative recording effort at Steve Albini's studio Electrical Audio. A Kickstarter was launched for the EP, raising $55,633 USD.

Taylor stated that during the collaboration, the only rule was "If it sounds like something we’ve already done, we throw it out." In an interview with Buddyhead Radio, Albini commented on the process: "Dan Smith just put together this ad hoc band with a singer named Steve Taylor... ...They play this really rowdy punk rock. And that record is fucked-up and great. I didn’t expect that kind of music out of them, and I certainly didn’t expect it to be as awesome as it was. I was expecting it to be charming or interesting, but it ended up being really raucous and really great."

== Promotion and release ==
On December 10, 2015, Guitar World premiered the title track from the EP, making it available for streaming. On January 25, 2016, Paste premiered the music video for the same song. Directed by Matthew Sterling, the video features the band members throwing water balloons at each other. Taylor said of the video that "It was a simple concept. Roll camera, pretend you’re on fire, and have your bandmates offscreen try and extinguish you with water balloons. Bonus points were awarded for direct hits to the face." Mike Rimmer from Cross Rhythms likened the video to the output of Devo. The EP was released on February 5, 2016, through Splint, with vinyl records available through Sounds Familyre. Steve Taylor & The Danielson Foil continued to tour as a collaborative act through February 12. A second music video from the project, "Nonchalant", was released on April 3, 2016.

== Music style ==
Critics described the overall sound of Wow to the Deadness as furious, chaotic punk rock. Guitar World wrote that the music has no clear parallels, but resembles "Magazine covering the Godspell soundtrack or the Buzzcocks trading verses with the Free Design." Mike Rimmer from Cross Rhythms likewise remarked that "This album really doesn't sound like anyone else", but it is "propelled by a punk aesthetic and Jimmy Abegg's excellent guitar work." Popdose found the output similar to that of Touch and Go Records bands, opining that the group released a "good, old-fashioned kidney punch of 'rott’n roll'". The Phantom Toolbooth considered the EP "an interesting mix of the bold, minimalist punk-pop we heard on Goliath and the staccato genre-defying primal child compositions of the Danielson Family albums. The over-all effect is more primal, more punk (or post-punk, if you want to sound trendy), and certainly more in your face." Both Taylor and Smith shared lead vocal duties on the recording, singing lines in harmony on some tracks and in duet on others. Taylor's vocals are deep, with his delivery described as "sometimes sinister, sometimes raucous." Smith performed in his familiar style of high-pitched, childlike vocals, but in a more restrained fashion then typical for his Danielson and Danielson Familie projects.

Jesus Freak Hideout described "The Dust Patrol" as "raw punk rock" and "Wow to the Deadness" as an "acoustic rock jam", with "Nonchalant" serving as the only ballad on the EP. "The Dust Patrol" was described by The Phantom Tollbooth as beginning and ending as a boogie, but with a slowed down bridge in the middle accompanied by a Mariachi trumpet line. Haydon Spenceley from Drowned in Sound described the brass interludes of "The Dust Patrol" as the only moments of calm on the album. "Drats" alternates between a rolling 6/8 signature during the verses and a driving 4/4 time on the chorus.

== Critical reception ==
Professional ratings
Review scores
Source	Rating
Cross Rhythms	10/10 stars
Drowned in Sound	7/10
Jesus Freak Hideout	4.5/5 stars
The Phantom Tollbooth	4.5/5 stars 4/5 stars

Wow to the Deadness was enthusiastically received by critics. Mike Rimmer from Cross Rhythms gave the EP a full ten-out-of-ten rating. He concluded that "On paper, you'd never have guessed that the marriage of Taylor and Danielson's music would produce something that works this well, but Wow!" Drowned in Sound's Haydon Spenceley rated that EP seven-out-of-ten, describing the recording as "one of 2016's most beguiling and potentially intimidating musical debuts." Lucas Munachen of Jesus Freak Hideout awarded the EP four-and-a-half stars out of five, finding the music fun and enjoyable and the lyricism impressive. Though he felt that the EP was a little short, he concluded that it "will no doubt keep listeners riotously dancing until Taylor pulls out another surprise record from the shadows." Michael Weaver of Jesus Freak Hideout also awarded the album four-and-a-half stars out of five, remarking that "This EP will likely end up being more of a niche project, but it's stellar nonetheless." DW. Dunphy of Popdose was also highly favorable to the EP, praising the experimentation and diversity of the recording and opining that "I don't know if this collective would have worked nearly as effectively had this been a full album effort. Six relatively short, and shockingly punk, tunes go down remarkably well — a surprise kick to the shins and exit, stage right." Bert Saraco of The Phantom Tollbooth rated Wow to the Deadness four-and-a-half stars out of five, finding that the EP should prove "a total delight for fans of the more extreme side of both Steve Taylor and Daniel Smith."

== Track listing ==
=== Pre-order download ===
NB "Drats" was named "Drat" in the download

No.	Title	Length
1.	"Drat"	2:49
2.	"The Dust Patrol"	1:59
3.	"A Muse"	2:31
4.	"Nonchalant"	3:00
5.	"Wait Up Downstep"	2:28
6.	"Wow to the Deadness"	2:33

=== Release version ===
No.	Title	Length
1.	"Wow to the Deadness"	2:34
2.	"Wait Up Downstep"	2:28
3.	"The Dust Patrol"	2:00
4.	"Nonchalant"	3:01
5.	"A Muse"	2:17
6.	"Drats"	2:53
