= Livin' Large =

- Directed by: Michael Schultz
- Written by: William Mosley-Payne
- Produced by: David V. Picker
- Starring: Terrence "T.C." Carson; Lisa Arrindell Anderson; Blanche Baker; Nathaniel "Afrika" Hall; Julia Campbell
- Cinematography: Peter Collister
- Edited by: Christopher Holmes
- Music by: Herbie Hancock
- Distributed by: The Samuel Goldwyn Company
- Release date: September 20, 1991
- Running time: 95 minutes
- Country: United States
- Language: English
- Box office: $5,467,959

Livin' Large! is a 1991 comedy film starring Terrence "T.C." Carson, Lisa Arrindell Anderson, and Loretta Devine.

== Plot ==
Dexter Jackson (Terrence C. Carson) is a young, black deliveryman in Atlanta, who aspires to become a news reporter. He gets what he considers his big break when he drives up to a hostage situation. When the reporter on the scene is killed, Dexter steps in and confronts the hostage-taker, who threatens to kill himself on live television. However, Dexter talks the man out of it, and ratings-obsessed executive producer Kate Penndragin (Blanche Baker) offers Dexter a reporter position at News 4 Atlanta.

A recurring gag throughout the film involves Jackson seeing himself on TV with notably different facial features, i.e. thinner lips, straight hair, and a lighter complexion. As Kate tries to transform Dexter's urban image (mainly his dreadlocks, clothing, and vocabulary), he begins questioning whether he's starting to sell out as he becomes more and more successful. In other words, he wonders whether becoming successful also means becoming "white".

Although Dexter begins to fulfill his dream, he also starts forgetting where he came from and begins destroying his important relationships. He alienates those close to him with tabloid-style exposé stories, such as a local barber's illegal numbers racket and a restaurant's unhealthy cooking style. Dexter loses his fiancée, Toynelle (Lisa Arrindell Anderson), after a night on the town results in him spending the night with ditzy weather forecaster Missy Carnes (Julia Campbell). Dexter also betrays his best friend and narrator Baker Moon (Nathaniel 'Afrika' Hall) by revealing a local criminal's plan to commit grand theft auto, a plan Baker secretly confided to Dexter. As a result of the report, Baker winds up in the hospital.

After longtime anchor Clifford Worthy (Bernie McInerney) loses it on the air, Kate promotes Dexter to lead anchor and teams him with Missy, much to his chagrin. Kate also arranges a live marriage between the two, which she plans to exploit for ratings. However, in the end, Dexter comes to his senses and calls off the wedding, deciding to go back to Toynelle. Finally admitting his fault for the entire ordeal, he publicly apologizes to those he stepped over. Dexter finally (and truly) reaches his goal, becoming co-anchor at News 4 Atlanta, alongside Clifford Worthy.

== Cast ==
- Terrence "T.C." Carson - Dexter Jackson
- Lisa Arrindell Anderson - Toynelle Davis
- Blanche Baker - Kate Penndragin
- Nathaniel Hall - Baker Moon
- Julia Campbell - Missy Carnes
- Bernie McInerney - Clifford Worthy
- Loretta Devine - Nadine Biggs
- Ted Henning - Fabian Marks

== Critical response ==
Film critic Desson Howe wrote in The Washington Post that the movie is "too bland to be offensive" and "mediocre pap" with a "heavy-hitting theme [that] is a smokescreen for an absence of fire," that it "retreads all-too-familiar territory," and noted that "You don't need a lifetime of sitcom TV viewing to see where this is going. But you'll need it to buy the one-note characters." Writing in the Austin Chronicle, critic Marjorie Baumgarten described the film as a "morality tale [that] is pretty predictable and uninspired [...] delivered with some fresh zip by its central cast," but noted that "you can't escape this creepy feeling that the people involved with inventing this story are none too wild about women as a category of people." Roger Ebert described the film as "beginning with a terrific idea for a movie, and then works hard, and successfully, to whittle it down to the level of a brainless sitcom."

== Box office ==
The movie was released September 20, 1991, in the US. It opened at #4 at the box office, grossing $2.1 million. Its total domestic gross was just under $5.5 million.
