= Shotgun Angel =

Studio album by Daniel Amos
- Released: 1977
- Studio: Martinsound Studios, Alhambra, California
- Genre: Country rock, Christian rock
- Label: Maranatha! Music
- Producer: Daniel Amos, Jonathan David Brown

Daniel Amos chronology
Daniel Amos (1976)	Shotgun Angel (1977)	Horrendous Disc (1981)

Shotgun Angel is the second album by Christian rock band Daniel Amos, released in 1977. It was their final album for Maranatha! Music and their last album performed in their early country rock sound.

== Background ==
The album is named after the song of the same name, which finished side one of the album. The song was written earlier by Bill Sprouse Jr. for his band The Road Home which featured future Daniel Amos drummer Ed McTaggart. After Sprouse's untimely death at age twenty-six, sound engineer Mike Shoup dug up an old four-track tape of the song and asked Dom Franco of the Maranatha! group Bethlehem to add pedal steel guitar to the song. When Daniel Amos heard it they decided to record it themselves and enlisted Franco to play the pedal steel and Shoup and McTaggart to add the CB radio voices on the recording.

Although DA's previous release was largely country, this album marked the start of a return to the band's pre-label roots, rock and roll, which took some of their country fans by surprise. Shotgun Angel was half country and half rock opera. The 'side two' of the LP featured lush orchestrations and a string of rock songs linked together in a way that was reminiscent of The Beatles 1967 Sgt. Pepper's Lonely Hearts Club Band album. The band even made a number of concert performances at this time with a full orchestra backing them.

== Reissues ==
In 1986, the entire "side two" of the album was remixed and re-released on a collection called The Revelation with some narration by Chuck Smith included between songs. The song "Soon!" was also added. The first appearance of the album on CD was in 1990.

In 2001 M8 put together a two-CD Shotgun Angel: 25th Anniversary Edition. The first CD was a re-issue of the original album while the second featured a two-part interview with Terry Taylor and Jerry Chamberlain on Rock & Religion Radio Show. While the band's management had involvement in the artwork of the release, the overall finished product was disappointing due to the label's poor quality control. The release included audio glitches, and even band members names were misspelled. Almost immediately, the band wanted to revisit the album with what it saw as an appropriate reissue once the timing was right and the budget was available.

In the years that followed the band's audio archives were cleaned-up and transferred to digital format. The first results of these efforts were released in 2006 with the two-disc deluxe 30th Anniversary edition of Daniel Amos, expanded editions of Terry Taylor's Imaginarium: Songs from the Neverhood and Darn Floor - Big Bite and not long after Shotgun Angel.

Stunt Records' Tom Gulotta and Eric Townsend were put in charge of putting a new Shotgun Angel reissue together, which would be released in connection with Born Twice Records. Gulotta cleaned up the original album master and made sure that digital glitches that were even found on the original CD release were corrected. The entire album was remastered and Townsend began remixing the band's original 1976 four-track pre-production demos and portions of the album's original 24-track masters for the bonus disc, in an effort to give listeners a new a unique way of hearing some of the album's tracks. Some band members were able to uncover numerous unpublished photos which would be used in the project's artwork and packaging. Other band members pored over the liner notes and lyrics to make corrections to errors found on all previous releases - including the original Maranatha! release. This culminated in June 2011 with Shotgun Angel: Collectors Deluxe Edition a two-disc set. It includes a 24-page booklet with full lyrics, unreleased songs, studio outtakes and other rarities.

== Reception ==
Professional ratings
Review scores
Source	Rating
AllMusic	4/5 stars

AllMusic showed a mixed reaction in their retrospective review, noting the overt similarity to the Eagles and deeming the rock opera of side two "a little too wide-eyed and doomsaying for most modern audiences". However, they praised the track "Better," comparing it to the psychedelic rock work of The Beatles. Critiques from other publications offered the following: "This record is a flat-out winner. Brilliant." from Campus Life Magazine; "Shotgun Angel' is truly an offering of excellence to the Lord." from Buzz magazine (UK), and "Not until now have we seen an album that is as versatile, professional, or as serious musically as is Daniel Amos' Shotgun Angel." from the Cornerstone newspaper. In Powell's Encyclopedia of Contemporary Christian Music he offers that it sounds "like nothing ever produced in contemporary music, Christian or otherwise" even though he notes comparisons with Queen, Pink Floyd and Abbey Road.

== Track listing ==
=== Side one ===
1. "Days and Nights" (Terry Scott Taylor, Jerry Chamberlain)
2. "Black Gold Fever" (Taylor)
3. "Praise Song" (Taylor)
4. "Father's Arms" (Taylor)
5. "Meal" (Taylor)
6. "Shotgun Angel" (Bill Sprouse, Jr)

=== Side two ===
1. "Finale: Bereshith Overture" (Stipech, Taylor, Chamberlain, Cook)
2. "Lady Goodbye" (Taylor, Chamberlain, Cook)
3. "The Whistler" (Taylor, Chamberlain, Cook)
4. "He's Gonna Do a Number On You" (Cook)
5. "Better" (Taylor, Chamberlain, Cook)
6. "Sail Me Away" (Taylor, Chamberlain)
7. "Posse in the Sky" (Taylor)

=== 2011 Deluxe Edition Bonus Disc ===
1. "Jonah and the Whale" (Sept 1976 4 track demo, with Steve Baxter)
2. "Fathers Arms" (Sept 1976 4 track demo 1)
3. "Posse in the Sky" (Sept 1976 4 track demo 1)
4. "Fathers Arms" (Dec 1976 demo 2)
5. "Black Gold Fever" (Dec 1976 demo)
6. "Praise Song" (Dec 1976 demo)
7. "Meal" (Dec 1976 demo)
8. "Shotgun Angel" (Dec 1976 demo)
9. "Finale: Bereshith Overture" (Dec 1976 demo)
10. "Lady Goodbye" (Dec 1976 demo)
11. "The Whistler" (Dec 1976 demo)
12. "He's Gonna Do a Number On You" (Dec 1976 demo)
13. "Better" (Dec 1976 demo)
14. "Sail Me Away" (Dec 1976 demo)
15. "Posse in the Sky" (Dec 1976 demo 2)
16. Maranatha Music Show - In The Studio (Hosted by John Styll) April 1977 Studio Snippet
17. "Days and Nights" (alt. mix)
18. "Black Gold Fever" (alt. mix)
19. "Meal" (alt. mix)
20. "Shotgun Bagel"
21. "Lady Goodbye" (alt. mix)
22. "The Whistler" (alt. mix)
23. "He's Gonna Do a Number On You" (alt. mix)
24. "Better" (alt. mix)
25. "Sail Me Away" (alt. mix)
26. Looney Tunes

== Personnel ==
- Jerry Chamberlain - lead guitar, vocals, lead vocals on "Shotgun Angel" and "Lady Goodbye", co-lead vocals on "Days and Nights"
- Mark Cook - keyboards, vocals, lead vocals on "He's Gonna Do a Number on You"
- Marty Dieckmeyer - bass, backing vocals
- Ed McTaggart - drums, backing vocals
- Terry Scott Taylor - rhythm guitars; vocals; lead vocals on all songs except "Shotgun Angel", "Lady Goodbye", "He's Gonna Do a Number on You" and "Finale: Bereshith Overture"; co-lead vocals on "Days and Nights"

== Production notes ==
- Alex MacDougall, Fred Petry: Percussion
- Pete Jacobs: Clarinets on "Black Gold Fever"
- Dom Franco: Pedal Steel Guitar
- Frank Marocco: Accordion
- Dan Amos: Carrot Choir, Celery Symphony on "Meal"
- John Benson: Eefin' on "Meal"
- Michael Wayne Shoup: CB
- Bill Hoppe: Additional FX/Synthesizers
- Produced & Engineered by Jonathan David Brown
- Strings Arranged and Conducted by Jim Stipech
- Recorded at: MartinSound Studios, Alhambra, California
- Mixed by Jonathan David Brown (alias "Your Local Hokie Okie") at Producers' Workshop, Hollyweird, California
- Bonus demos recorded and owned by Michael Wayne Shoup
- Bonus re-mixes by Eric Townsend
- Re-Mastered by J Powell at Steinhaus
- Cover Concept by Daniel Amos
- Original Art Direction, Design and Layout by Neal Buchanan
- Photographs by Larry Frowick, Scott Lockwood, and others
- 2011 Reissue Design and Layout by Tom Gulotta and Eric Townsend
- Re-Issue Producers: Matthew Hunt, Tom Gulotta and Eric Townsend
