= Liver (album) =

Live album by Steve Taylor
- Released: 1995
- Genre: Rock
- Label: Warner Bros.

Steve Taylor chronology
Squint (1993)	Liver (1995)	Goliath (2014)

Professional ratings
Review scores
Source	Rating
CCM Magazine	(not rated)

Liver is a live album by Steve Taylor, released in 1995. Its contents cover all of Taylor's career at the time (up through Squint), including his time with Chagall Guevara.

== Track listing ==
1. Jim Morrison's Grave - 3:19
2. The Lament of Desmond R.G. Underwood-Frederick IV - 4:37
3. I Want to Be a Clone - 2:05
4. Escher's World (Taylor/Perkins/Nichols) - 3:33
5. On the Fritz - 6:31
6. Bannerman - 3:19
7. Hero - 5:14
8. Jesus Is for Losers - 4:13
9. The Finish Line - 5:41
10. Violent Blue (Taylor/Perkins/Nichols) - 4:29

All songs written by Taylor except where noted.

== Personnel ==
- Steve Taylor – vocals
- Wade Jaynes – bass guitar
- Chris Kearney – drums
- Mark Townsend – guitar, vocals
- Greg Wollan – guitar, vocals
