= Lisa Arrindell =

American actress

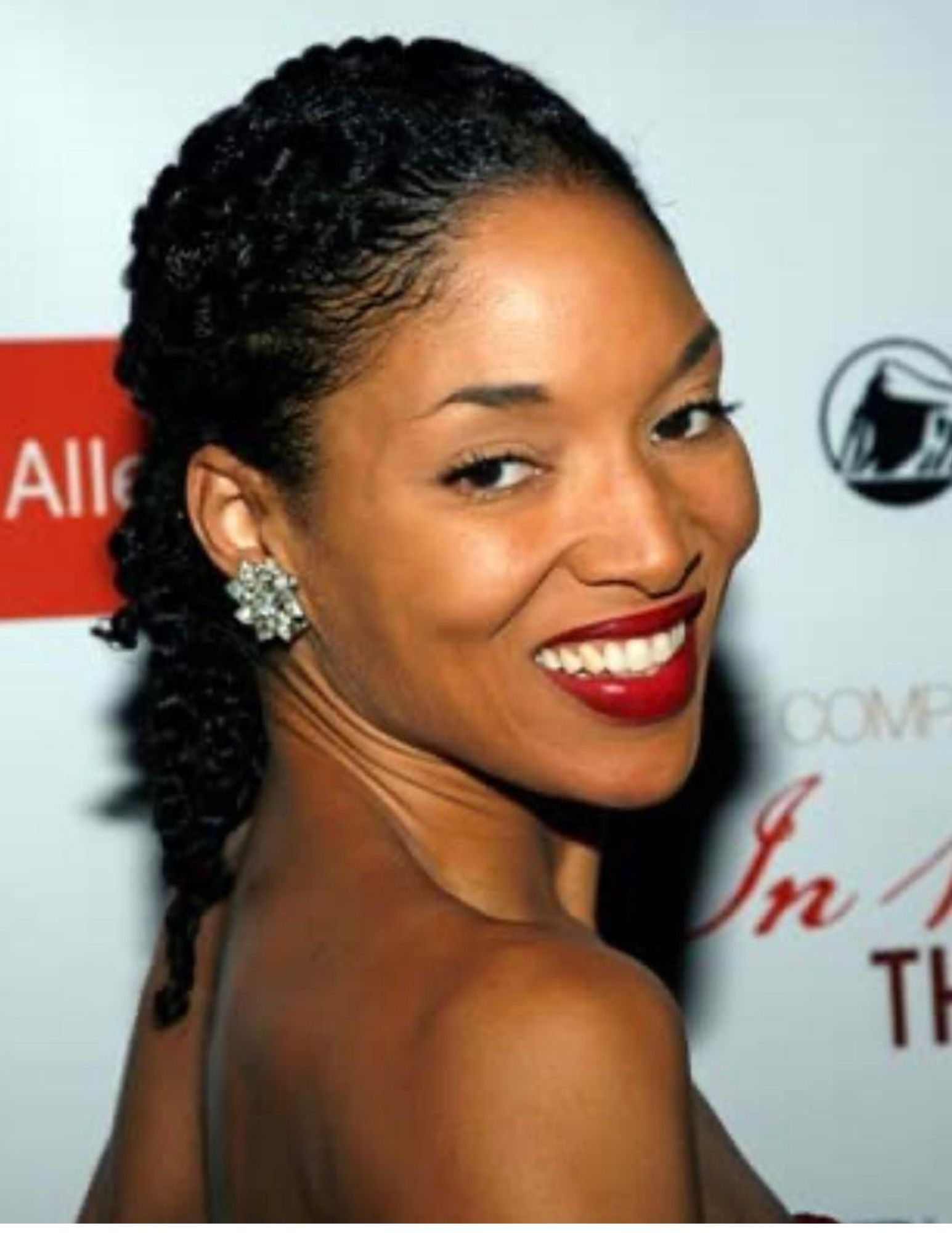
- Arrindell at Evidence Dance Company's Winter Gala at the Hudson Theater in 2008
- Born: March 24, 1969 (age 57); The Bronx, New York, U.S.
- Education: The Juilliard School
- Occupation: Actress
- Years active: 1991–present
- Spouse: Basil Anderson (m. 1993; div. 2015)
- Children: 2

Lisa Arrindell (born March 24, 1969), also credited as Lisa Arrindell Anderson, is an American actress. Beginning her career in the early 1990s, Arrindell is most known for her role as Vanessa Breaux-Henderson in Madea's Family Reunion (2006), Heather Comstock in the series In the House (1995), and Toynelle Davis in Livin' Large (1991).

== Early life and education ==
Lisa Arrindell was born in the Bronx on March 24, 1969 and brought straight home to Brooklyn, where she grew up. Arrindell attended the High School of Performing Arts, now called Fiorello H. LaGuardia High School. Arrindell earned her Bachelor of Fine Arts Degree in Theatre from The Juilliard School in New York City.

== Career ==
Arrindell made her film debut in Walt Disney's One Good Cop alongside Michael Keaton in 1991. That same year, she played the lead in the comedy Livin' Large. She later appeared in Trial by Jury (1994) and Spike Lee's Clockers (1995). Arrindell was a series regular in the NBC sitcom In the House in 1995. She co-starred in several made-for-television movies, including A Lesson Before Dying (1999) alongside Don Cheadle and Cicely Tyson, and Disappearing Acts (2000) starring Sanaa Lathan. In 2006, Arrindell appeared in three films, Big Momma's House 2, The Second Chance, and Madea's Family Reunion. In 2010, she appeared in The Wronged Man with Julia Ormond and Mahershala Ali. Arrindell appeared opposite Isaiah Washington in the thriller The Sin Seer (2015) and appeared in The Immortal Life of Henrietta Lacks (2017), starring Oprah Winfrey. She also had guest starring roles on The Cosby Show, The Practice, The Steve Harvey Show, Drop Dead Diva, Law & Order: Special Victims Unit, and Elementary. In 2017, she had a recurring role in the Bounce TV prime-time soap opera Saints & Sinners. She also appeared in Fox's Our Kind of People in 2022.

Arrindell recently starred in the film 12 Angry Men And...Women on Apple TV with Wendell Pierce and BET's Favorite Son (2021). Arrindell opened the revival of Law & Order (2022) in its first episode as Veronica King. Arrindell has guest starred on several other network series, including Random Acts of Flyness, Bull, Elementary, Madam Secretary, Law & Order: Special Victims Unit, and Notorious. Some of her stage performances include the Broadway revival of Cat on a Hot Tin Roof with James Earl Jones and Phylicia Rashad, Jubilee (Arena Stage), Reparations (Billie Holiday Theatre), Richard III (Delacorte Theater), Heliotrope Bouquet (Playwrights Horizons), and Earth & Sky (Second Stage).

== Personal life ==
Arrindell married Basil Anderson in 1993. Together, they have two children. The couple divorced in 2015, and she reverted to her maiden name. Arrindell currently resides in New York City.

== Filmography ==
=== Film ===
Year	Title	Role	Notes
1991	One Good Cop	Raisa	
1991	Livin' Large	Toynelle Davis	
1994	Trial by Jury	Eleanor Lyons	
1995	Clockers	Sharon Dunham	
1999	A Lesson Before Dying	Vivian Baptiste	
2006	Big Momma's House 2	Danielle	
2006	The Second Chance	Amanda Sanders	
2006	Madea's Family Reunion	Vanessa Breaux-Henderson	
2012	Probable Cause	Captain	
2014	First Impression	Imani Townsend	
2014	Christmas Wedding Baby	Lori	
2015	The Sin Seer	Rose Ricard	
2018	One Last Thing	Margo	
2018	Turtle vs. Octopus	Sage	Short
2021	Favorite Son	First Lady Wilson	
2022	Tyson's Run	Dr. Wyatt	
2022	The Christmas Clapback	Brandy	
2023	Once Upon A Time in the District	Mayor Sharp	
2024	Albany Road	Carol	
2024	Betty & Blue	The Announcer	Short
2024	An Extraordinary Life	Adrienne Herndon	Short

=== Television ===
Year	Title	Role	Notes
1991	The Cosby Show	Imani Baker	Episode: "Theo and the Kids: Part 1"
1992	ScreenPlay	Joanne Matheson	Episode: "Buying a Landslide"
1992–93	Ghostwriter	Special Agent Norma	Episode: "Into the Comics: Part 1 & 4"
1995	In the House	Heather Comstock	Recurring cast (season 1-2)
1997	The Practice	Andrea Wilton	Episode: "The Means"
1997–98	The Steve Harvey Show	Rachel	Recurring cast (season 2)
1999	Having Our Say: The Delany Sisters' First 100 Years	Young Sadie	TV movie
2000	Disappearing Acts	Claudette	TV movie
2007	K-Ville	Maya Beaulieu	Episode: "Boulet in a China Shop"
2008	Tyler Perry's House of Payne	Dr. Lynn Gilcrest	Episode: "Play on Playa"
2009–10	Meet the Browns	Karen	Guest cast (season 1 & 3-4)
2010	Law & Order: Special Victims Unit	Cara Raleigh	Episode: "Disabled"
2010	The Wronged Man	Michelle Willis	TV movie
2010–11	Drop Dead Diva	Pacific Holdings Lawyer	Guest cast (season 2-3)
2013	A Christmas Blessing	Pamela	TV movie
2014	Drumline: A New Beat	Lois Raymond	TV movie
2016	Law & Order: Special Victims Unit	Robin Daughtry	Episode: "Sheltered Outcasts"
2016	Notorious	Sergeant Betsy Powell	Episode: "Pilot"
2017	The Quad	-	Episode: "#MuleBone"
2017	Saints & Sinners	Rebecca Jourdan	Main cast (season 2)
2017	The Immortal Life of Henrietta Lacks	Ethel	TV movie
2018	Madam Secretary	Judge Tamara Pollard	Episode: "Family Separation: Part 1"
2019	Elementary	Ethiopian Consul	Episode: "The Price of Admission"
2019	Bull	Dr. Linsey Allendale	Episode: "Into the Mystic"
2021–22	Our Kind of People	Giselle Hilgard	Recurring cast (season 1)
2022	Law & Order	Veronica King	Episode: "The Right Thing"
2023	Favorite Son Christmas	Lady Rita	TV movie
2025	Watson	Felicia Mancini	Episode: "Wait for the Punchline"

== Accolades ==
Year	Awards	Category	Recipient	Outcome
2000	Black Reel Awards	Black Reel Award for Outstanding Supporting Actress, TV Movie or Limited Series	A Lesson Before Dying	Nominated
2001	Black Reel Awards	Black Reel Award for Outstanding Supporting Actress, TV Movie or Limited Series	Disappearing Acts	Nominated
2015	American Black Film Festival	American Black Film Festival Grand Jury Prize for Best Actress	The Sin Seer	Won
