= Mission Records =

Oldies-33
- Founded: 1998
- Founder: Glenn Frey and Peter Lopez
- Country of origin: United States

Mission Records was created by Glenn Frey and Peter Lopez in 1998, as an independent record label. The company is distributed by Navarre Corp. Its first album was One Planet, One Groove by Max Carl & Big Dance, released January 20, 1998. The company was originally intended as an outlet for Frey's solo records due to his dissatisfaction with the bigger labels; however, he did not release any of his own work on it, and the label is now inactive.

== See also ==
- List of record labels
