= Donald Miller (author) =

American author

- Born: August 12, 1971 (age 55)
- Occupations: Author, CEO, Public speaker
- Writing career
- Genres: Memoir, Business, Business Strategy
- Notable work: Building a StoryBrand
- Website: storybrand.com

Donald "Don" Miller (born August 12, 1971) is an American author, public speaker, and business owner. He is the CEO of StoryBrand, a marketing company. He is also an author of personal essays and reflections about faith, God, and self-discovery. His first New York Times bestselling book was Blue Like Jazz.

== Biography ==
At 21, Miller left his home in Pearland, Texas, and went to Portland, Oregon, where he owned a small Portland-based textbook publishing company called Coffee House Books. Miller became a New York Times Bestselling Author when he published Blue Like Jazz in 2003. In 2004, Miller released Searching For God Knows What, which discusses how the traditional understanding of the gospel of Jesus aligns with a theory of personality. In 2005, he released Through Painted Deserts, a republished version of his first book, Prayer and the Art of Volkswagen Maintenance, originally published in 2000. In 2006, he wrote another book, To Own A Dragon, on his reflections on growing up without a father. Miller is also the founder of The Mentoring Project, a non-profit that partners with local churches to mentor fatherless young men. Miller's next book, A Million Miles in a Thousand Years, was released in late 2009.

In 2009, Miller served on a Presidential Advisory Council on Fatherhood and Healthy Families.

On November 30, 2013, Donald Miller married Elizabeth "Betsy" Miltenberger. They now live in Nashville, Tennessee.

In 2015, he published the book Scary Close, discussing his views and personal history of self-discovery and intimacy in relationships.

In 2015 Miller helped The Federation for Children create the Failing Our Kids campaign that lobbied state governments for school voucher programs. In early 2016 Miller consulted with Fox River Partnerships, an economic think tank in Illinois, to develop a messaging campaign for a new economic and tax plan called a Circulation Economy.

In 2017, he published the book Building a StoryBrand, on marketing and messaging. He presents a marketing framework inspired by principles of storytelling called the StoryBrand 7 Part Framework.

== Published works ==
- Prayer and the Art of Volkswagen Maintenance: Finding God on the Open Road, 2000 (Harvest House Publishers) Note: republished as Through Painted Deserts
- Blue Like Jazz: Nonreligious Thoughts on Christian Spirituality, 2003 (Nelson Books)
- Searching For God Knows What, 2004 (Nelson Books)
- Through Painted Deserts: Light, God, and Beauty on the Open Road, 2005 (Nelson Books)
- To Own a Dragon: Reflections On Growing Up Without a Father, 2006 (NavPress) Note: expanded and republished as "Father Fiction"
- A Million Miles in a Thousand Years, Fall 2009 (Nelson Books)
- Father Fiction: Chapters for a Fatherless Generation, 2010 (Hodder & Stoughton)
- Storyline: Finding Your Subplot in God's Story, 2012 (Donald Miller Words, LLC)
- Scary Close, 2015 (Nelson)
- Building a StoryBrand, 2017 (HarperCollins Leadership)
- Marketing Made Simple, 2020 (HarperCollins Leadership)
- Business Made Simple, 2021 (HarperCollins Leadership)
- Hero on a Mission: A Path to a Meaningful Life, 2022 (HarperCollins Leadership)
