= On the Fritz =

Studio album by Steve Taylor
- Released: 1985
- Studio: Grand Slam Studios, West Orange, New Jersey
- Genre: Christian rock, new wave
- Length: 39:53
- Label: Sparrow
- Producer: Ian McDonald, Steve Taylor

Steve Taylor chronology
Meltdown (1984)	On the Fritz (1985)	I Predict 1990 (1987)

Professional ratings
Review scores
Source	Rating
AllMusic	3/5 stars

On the Fritz is the title of the third release and second full-length album by Christian rock singer-songwriter Steve Taylor. It was released in 1985 on Sparrow Records. Produced by musician Ian McDonald (who co-founded the bands King Crimson and Foreigner), Taylor arranged and wrote all of the tracks on the album.

After its release, the album peaked at the No. 8 slot on Billboard's Top Contemporary Christian album chart.

== Track listing ==
Written and arranged by Steve Taylor.

Side one

1. "This Disco (Used to Be a Cute Cathedral)" – 4:06
2. "On the Fritz" – 3:56
3. "It's a Personal Thing" – 2:58
4. "To Forgive" – 3:54
5. "You've Been Bought" – 2:45

Side two

1. "You Don't Owe Me Nothing" – 3:22
2. "I Manipulate" – 5:07
3. "Lifeboat" – 4:35
4. "Drive, He Said" – 4:30
5. "I Just Wanna Know" – 4:40

== Song details ==
"To Forgive" was inspired by the personal appearance of Pope John Paul II with his attempted assassin, Mehmet Ali Agca, and the Pope's message.

"This Disco (Used To Be A Cute Cathedral)" was inspired by the Limelight, which was in operation from 1983 to 2003. It was once known as the "Episcopal Church of the Holy Communion."

Track "This Disco (Used to Be a Cute Cathedral)" later appeared on the Taylor releases Limelight, The Best We Could Find (+3 That Never Escaped), and Now the Truth Can Be Told, which came out in 1986, 1988, and 1994 respectively.

"I Manipulate" is a criticism of the controversial teachings of Bill Gothard, which were considered to be legalistic, if not abusive.

== Personnel ==
- Steve Taylor – vocals, Lin Drum 9000 on "I Manipulate"
- Ian McDonald – percussion, guitars, keyboards on "Lifeboat", alto saxophone on "You Don't Owe Me Nothing"
- Tony Davilio – guitars
- Hugh McCracken – guitars
- George Small – keyboards
- Alan Childs – drums
- Carmine Rojas – bass
- John McCurry – guitar solo on "To Forgive" and "You've Been Bought"
- Cactus Moser – percussion and Simmons drums on "I Manipulate", finger snaps on "Drive He Said"
- Dave Thrush – alto saxophone on "Its a Personal Thing", tenor saxophone on "You Don't Owe Me Nothing"
- Mary Davis – background vocals
- Beverly Slade – background vocals
- Kitty Markham – background vocals
- Debbie Taylor – finger snaps on "Drive He Said"
- Produced and engineered – Ian McDonald and Steve Taylor
- Synthesizer Programming – Larry Fast and George Small
- Engineered – Alan Douches
- Recorded and Mixed at Grand Slam Studios, West Orange, New Jersey
- Assistant Engineers – Joey Flamingo and Jay Healy
- Mixed – Ian McDonald and Alan Douches
- Mastered – Greg Calbi at Sterling Sound, New York City
