= Robert Briner =

American sports manager and television producer (1935–1999)

Robert (Bob) Briner (28 August 1935 – 1999) was a leading figure in professional sports management, an Emmy Award-winning television producer, and president of ProServ Television.

Briner was the first Western sports executive to enter China after the Cultural Revolution and introduced National Basketball Association games to Chinese television. He developed major tennis tournaments in several countries including Israel, Cuba, South Africa and the Soviet Union. Briner earned a bachelor's degree in business and English from Greenville College.

Briner was also a prolific writer, regularly contributing to the New York Times and Sports Illustrated. His books include Roaring Lambs, Lambs Among Wolves, and The Management Methods of Jesus. Briner finished his final book, The Final Roar, shortly before dying of abdominal cancer in 1999.

Briner was a devout evangelical Christian and in 2003 was posthumously inducted into the Indiana Wesleyan University Society of World Changers as its first member.

== See also ==
- Roaring Lambs, a 2000 compilation album of CCM artist recordings.
