= I Predict 1990 =

Studio album by Steve Taylor
- Released: 1987
- Studios: Music Grinder Los Angeles, California; Reelsound Bus Nashville, Tennessee; Wayne Cook Studios Los Angeles, California; CBS Studios London
- Genre: Rock
- Length: 43:44
- Label: Myrrh
- Producers: The Beaufort Twins Dave Perkins and Steve Taylor

Steve Taylor chronology
On the Fritz (1985)	I Predict 1990 (1987)	Squint (1993)

Professional ratings
Review scores
Source	Rating
AllMusic	4.5/5 stars
CCM Magazine	(not rated)

I Predict 1990 is the title of the fourth release and third full-length album by singer-songwriter Steve Taylor. Lyrically, the album explores actions that exploit others to various ends from multiple perspectives. CCM magazine found that the overall theme is that the ends never justify the means. It was released as a one-off on Myrrh Records instead of Sparrow Records. Taylor has said that the album's title was meant as a parody of a Lester Sumrall TV program and book, I Predict 1986.

== Background ==
The cover was designed and painted by Taylor's wife, Debi. It was intended to resemble early 20th-century French poster art; however, some Christians felt that it resembled a tarot card, which sparked controversy. Additionally, one televangelist claimed that the image was of Taylor saluting Satan, and that it additionally contained secret messages and links to New Age philosophy. These accusations caused some Christian book stores to pull the album.

Per the album's credits, all songs were written by Steve Taylor, except "Babylon" by Taylor and Dave Perkins. The ending theme to "Jim Morrison's Grave" was "borrowed" from Claude Debussy; and the introduction to "Harder to Believe" was "stolen" from Sergei Rachmaninoff.

The song "I Blew Up the Clinic Real Good" proved controversial. The song's lyrics – a scathing critique of anti-abortion activists who in turn blow up abortion clinics or kill doctors – resulted in Christian bookstores pulling the album, either because the song's critique of the anti-abortion movement offended store owners and customers, or because these same individuals missed the song's satirical point, and believed Taylor advocated such violence. Taylor himself would occasionally call these stores to personally explain the song to them. Taylor's tour of Australia was canceled due to the controversy around "I Blew Up The Clinic Real Good", largely due to misunderstanding of its satire.

Disillusioned with the Christian music scene following these and other controversies during the course of his career, Taylor formed the secular alternative rock band Chagall Guevara shortly after the release of the album.

== Track listing ==
1. "I Blew Up the Clinic Real Good" – 4:12
2. "What Is the Measure of Your Success?" – 4:39
3. "Since I Gave Up Hope I Feel a Lot Better" – 3:29
4. "Babylon" – 4:51
5. "Jim Morrison's Grave" – 4:29
6. "Svengali" – 4:30
7. "Jung and the Restless" – 4:32
8. "Innocence Lost" – 5:03
9. "A Principled Man" – 3:27
10. "Harder to Believe Than Not To" – 4:32

== Personnel ==
Some Band

Steve Taylor – vocals and backup percussion
Dave Thrush – saxophones
Jeff Stone – guitar
Glen Holmen – bass
Jack Kelly – drums
Steve Goomas – keyboards
Gym Nicholson – guitar

Additional musicians

Dave Perkins – additional guitar on all songs except "Jim Morrison's Grave" and "Harder to Believe"
Greg Husted – assorted keyboard tracks and accordion
Papa John Creach – fiddle
Ashley Cleveland – vocal stylings on "Jim Morrison's Grave", "Svengali" and "Babylon"
Annie McCaig – backing vocals on "Success" and "A Principled Man"
Nathan East – bass on "Clinic"
Gary Lunn – bass on "Hope"
Lisa Cates – percussion
Mike Mead – more percussion
Mary Bates – operatic vocal on "Harder to Believe"
Jim Horn – tenor saxophone on "Clinic"
Ross Holmen – French horn
John Andrew Schreiner – synth bass on "Svengali"
Janet Croninger – "Jung" woman
Fred Travalena – "Jung" doctor
Del Newman – orchestration on "Harder to Believe Than Not To"

Production notes

The Beaufort Twins (Dave Perkins and Steve Taylor) – producers and engineers
Dave Perkins – producer, engineer, mixing
Steve Taylor – producer, mixing
David Schober – engineer
Malcolm Harper – engineer
Robert Wartinbee – assistant engineer
Michael Ross – engineer on "Harder To Believe"
Music Grinder, Los Angeles, California – recording location
Reelsound Bus, Nashville, Tennessee – recording location
Wayne Cook Studios, Los Angeles, California – recording location
CBS Studios, London – recording location
Reelsound truck, Austin, Texas (48 track) – mixing location
Bob Ludwig – mastering
Masterdisk, New York, New York – mastering location

- Dave Perkins and Steve Taylor are listed as producers as "The Beaufort Twins." A likely satire of the Mick Jagger & Keith Richards production/songwriting partnership billed as The Glimmer Twins. They got the name from the Blackadder TV show.
