= Meltdown (Steve Taylor album) =

Studio album by Steve Taylor
- Released: 1984
- Studios: Sundberg Studios, Denver, Colorado
- Genres: New wave, Christian rock
- Length: 43:00
- Label: Sparrow
- Producer: Jonathan David Brown

Steve Taylor chronology
I Want to Be a Clone (1983)	Meltdown (1984)	On the Fritz (1985)

Professional ratings
Review scores
Source	Rating
AllMusic	4.5/5 stars

Meltdown is the second release and debut full-length album by American musician Steve Taylor. It followed 1983's I Want to Be a Clone and featured a similar kind of style, involving Christian rock incorporating new wave musical influences, while also being produced by Jonathan David Brown. The album did well, commercially, reaching the No. 10 spot on Billboard's Top Contemporary Christian chart.

It additionally received positive critical reviews from publications such as Billboard, saying that "Taylor has an edge and vitality". The album was listed at No. 18 in the 2001 book CCM Presents: The 100 Greatest Albums in Christian Music. Like other works by Taylor, the album's songs touch on many socio-political issues; "We Don't Need No Colour Code" denounces Christian organizations that practice racism while "Over My Dead Body" calls for more attention to violations of human rights overseas.

== Track listing ==
Side one

1. "Meltdown (at Madame Tussaud's)" – 4:26
2. "We Don't Need No Colour Code" – 2:43
3. "Am I In Sync?" – 4:32
4. "Meat the Press" – 3:48
5. "Over My Dead Body" – 5:21

Side two

1. "Sin For a Season" – 4:14
2. "Guilty By Association" – 3:21
3. "Hero" – 3:40
4. "Jenny" – 4:04
5. "Baby Doe" – 3:51

The CD was issued more than a year after the vinyl and cassette versions. It was entitled Meltdown and Meltdown Remixes and was also released on Sparrow Records.

CD track listing

1. "Meltdown (at Madame Tussaud's)" – 4:26
2. "We Don't Need No Colour Code" – 2:43
3. "Am I In Sync?" – 4:32
4. "Meat the Press" – 3:48
5. "Over My Dead Body" – 5:21
6. "Meltdown (at Madame Tussaud's)" [extended version - remix] – 6:24
7. "Sin For a Season" – 4:14
8. "Guilty By Association" – 3:21
9. "Hero" – 3:40
10. "Jenny" – 4:04
11. "Baby Doe" – 3:51
12. "Meltdown (at Madame Tussaud's)" [instrumental extended version - remix] – 4:29
13. "Meltdown (at Madame Tussaud's)" [edited version - remix] – 3:35

== Song references ==
The title track alludes to the famous attraction of Madame Tussauds, a wax museum in London, England.

"Baby Doe" was a vocal response to the early 1980 incidents involving the deaths of handicapped newborns that resulted from the withholding of medical treatment. The lyrics go beyond specific criticism to the individuals directly involved in those cases to condemning societal indifference and callousness in general, having lyrics about how "lawyers are bought" and the "presses have run". Taylor later remarked, "I don't like the idea of me just pointing the finger. In the song 'Baby Doe,' I was just as much to blame as the parents, because I wasn't doing anything about it."

"We Don't Need No Colour Code" challenged and ridiculed the racial policies of Bob Jones University, among other institutions. In its style, Taylor intentionally used musical references to African-American musician Bo Diddley. More recently, Taylor has explained that he finds joy in the song given the success of anti-racist efforts worldwide over the years.

"Guilty By Association" condemns evangelists that abuse Christian teachings and just seek fame and money for themselves.

"Over My Dead Body" called for more attention to be given to international violations of human rights.

== Personnel ==
Some Band

- Steve Taylor – vocals and backup percussion
- Kerry Conner – guitars
- Cactus Moser – drums
- Chris Richards – bass
- Dave Thrush – saxophone
- Woody Waddell – keyboards (including the Mighty Farfisa)

Production notes

- Writer and arranger – Steve Taylor
- Producer and engineer – Jonathan David Brown
- Recording location – Sundberg Studios, Denver, Colorado
- Mixing location – Mama Jo's, North. Hollywood, California
- Mastering – Future Disc, Universal City
- Album artwork – The Graphics Studio
- Photography – Greg Wigler
- Cover coordination – B. Charlyne Hinesley
