= I Want to Be a Clone =

EP by Steve Taylor
- Released: 1983
- Genre: Christian rock, new wave, post-punk
- Length: 16:50
- Label: Sparrow
- Producer: Jonathan David Brown

Steve Taylor chronology
I Want to Be a Clone (1983)	Meltdown (1984)

Professional ratings
Review scores
Source	Rating
Allmusic	4/5 stars
Cross Rhythms	10/10 stars

I Want to Be a Clone is the title of the debut EP by new wave and post-punk influenced Christian musician Steve Taylor. As in later works, the singer-songwriter mixed criticism of general secular society, for things such as empty materialism and selfishness, with criticism of Christian church organizations, for things such as muddying the gospel message for marketing. Jonathan David Brown produced the work.

After hearing this album, influential Christian author Francis Schaeffer wrote the following to Taylor; "The combination of music and lyrics really works on a very high level, and the message, therefore, comes across with real clarity... in the light of the gifts that the Lord has so obviously given you, and which you obviously developed with care and hard work, I do urge you with all my heart to press on. You are really doing something marvelously worthwhile. I must say the words really cut a wide swath in the need in the church today."

== Track listing ==
All tracks were written and arranged by Steve Taylor.

1. "Steeplechase" – 1:25
2. "I Want to Be a Clone" – 2:30
3. "Whatever Happened to Sin?" – 3:07
4. "Written Guarantee" – 2:36
5. "Bad Rap (Who You Tryin' to Kid, Kid?)" – 3:00
6. "Whatcha Gonna Do When Your Number's Up?" – 4:12

== Personnel ==
- Steve Taylor – vocals, keyboards (featuring the Mighty Farfisa)
- Kerry Conner – guitars
- Cactus Moser – drums
- Brian Tankersley – bass
- Dave Thrush – saxophone
- Harry Bruckner – bass guitar on "Whatcha"

Rights, raps and claps on "Clone", "Bad Rap" and "Written Guarantee" the Screaming Chapalaires (courtesy of Nosuch Records)

Production notes

- Jonathan David Brown – producer, engineer
- John Sandberg's basement – recording location
- Bill's house – additional recording
- Weddington Studios – mixing location
- Steve Hall – mastering at MCA/Whitney
