= Steve Taylor =

American singer (born 1957)

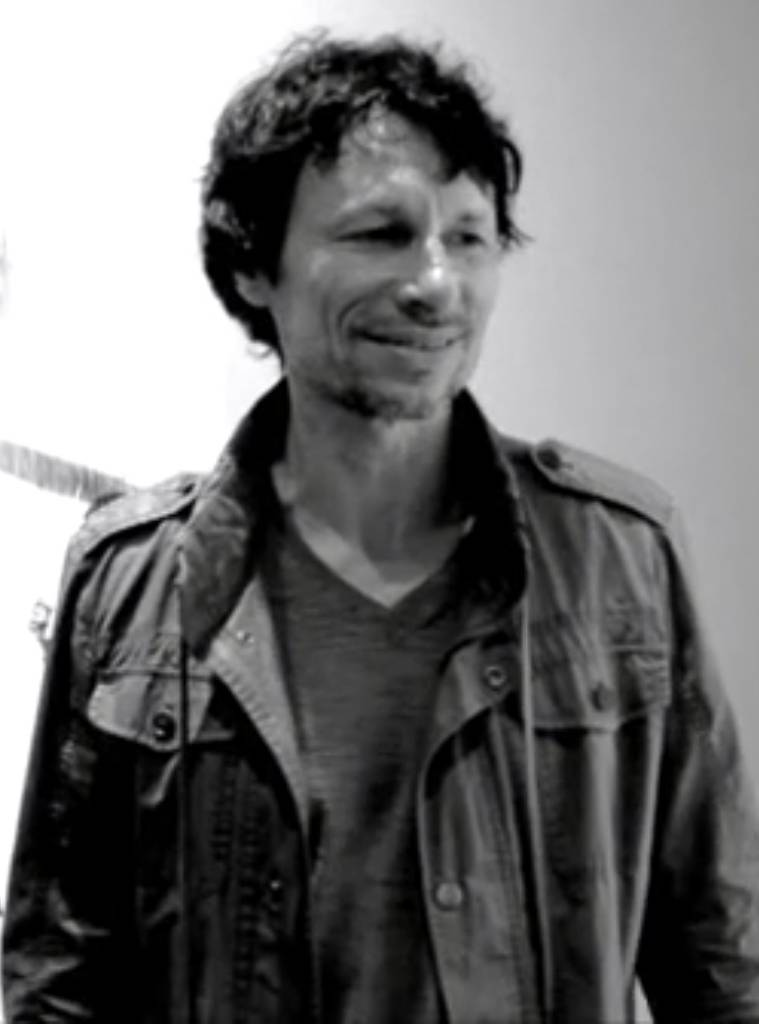
- Taylor at SXSW 2012
- Born: Roland Stephen Taylor; December 9, 1957 (age 68); Brawley, California, U.S.
- Education: Biola University; University of Colorado Boulder
- Occupations: Singer; songwriter; record producer; filmmaker; music executive; actor; assistant professor
- Years active: 1980–present
- Spouse: Debbie L. Taylor (m. 1985)
- Children: 1
- Musical career
- Genres: Christian alternative rock; new wave; post-punk
- Instruments: Vocals; keyboards; percussion
- Years active: 1982–present
- Labels: Sparrow; MCA; Warner Alliance; Myrrh; Squint; Sounds Familyre
- Member of: Chagall Guevara, Steve Taylor & The Perfect Foil

Academic work
- Institutions: Lipscomb University

Roland Stephen Taylor (born December 9, 1957) is an American singer, songwriter, record producer, music executive, filmmaker, assistant professor, and actor. A figure in what has come to be known as Christian alternative rock, Taylor enjoyed a successful solo career during the 1980s, and also served in the short-lived group Chagall Guevara.

In contrast to many Christian musical artists, his songs have often taken aim at Christian hypocrisy with the use of satirical, sardonic lyrics. In 1997, he founded the record label Squint Entertainment, which fueled the careers of artists such as Sixpence None the Richer, Chevelle, and Burlap to Cashmere. Despite this success, Taylor was ousted from the label by its parent, Word Entertainment, in 2001.

Taylor has produced and written for numerous musical acts, one of the most consistent being Newsboys. As a film-maker, Taylor co-wrote, directed, and produced the feature films Down Under the Big Top, The Second Chance, and Blue Like Jazz. After a decade long hiatus, Taylor returned to performing music in 2010 as the front-man for Steve Taylor & The Perfect Foil, a supergroup he founded with Peter Furler, Jimmy Abegg, and John Mark Painter. Along with a university residency and continued filmmaking, Taylor resumed work on unfinished Chagall Guevara material into the 2020s.

== Biography ==
=== Early life ===
Taylor, the eldest of three children, was born in Brawley, California. Taylor's father, Roland Taylor, was a Baptist minister. When Taylor was six years old, the family relocated to Northglenn, Colorado, a suburb of Denver. He graduated from Northglenn High School in 1976. While there, he attempted to learn the bass guitar, piano and trombone.

Upon graduation from high school, Taylor enrolled at Biola University in California. During his first year, he was first of the 100 chosen, from 20,000 applicants, to spend the summer at John Davidson's summer camp. At the camp, Taylor spent time learning from singers like Tony Orlando, Florence Henderson, and John Davidson.

Taylor returned home and enrolled at the University of Colorado Boulder, to study "serious music". He graduated there in 1980, but described his Bachelor of Arts degree in music and theater as being worth "slightly more than the cash value of a Pizza Hut coupon."

=== 1980s ===
In 1980, Taylor wrote and directed a pop musical comedy titled Nothing to Lose based on the parable of the Prodigal Son from the Bible. It had a short run at a community theater in Denver. He also wrote and starred in a short film, Joe's Distributing, a parody of avant-garde films.

Taylor wrote articles during this time that were published in The Wittenburg Door and CCM Magazine (for which he won an award from the Evangelical Press Association).

After recording a demo of original songs, Taylor began to write for the musical group the Continental Singers. The Continental Singers' founder, Cam Floria invited Taylor to join the group as assistant director on a tour to France, Italy, and Poland sponsored by Solidarity.

When he returned to the United States, he was asked to perform at the Christian Artists' 1982 Music Seminar in Denver. Billy Ray Hearn, president of Sparrow Records, was backstage and immediately signed Taylor to a recording contract.

He recorded his debut solo project I Want to Be a Clone in 1982 and released it in January 1983. He quickly gained a reputation for writing songs that satirized beliefs and practices with which he disagreed.

In 1983, Taylor recorded his first full-length album. Released in 1984, Meltdown included some of the demo material that was not on Clone along with some new material. His video single of the title track, "Meltdown (at Madame Tussauds)" was played on MTV, which was unusual for a Christian artist at the time. The video featured an appearance by actress Lisa Whelchel. The album also included "We Don't Need No Colour Code", which was critical of Bob Jones University and its racial policies.

Another track on Meltdown, "Guilty By Association", one of the original demo songs, includes a jab with an impression in the middle eight at televangelist Jimmy Swaggart. The song "On the Fritz", the title track from Taylor's next studio album, was also targeted at Swaggart. Swaggart later struck back by devoting part of a chapter of Religious Rock 'N' Roll, a Wolf in Sheep's Clothing (ISBN 0-935113-05-3) to Taylor, whom he saw as playing evil rock music.

During a performance at 1984's Cornerstone Festival, Taylor fractured his ankle while jumping off the stage. He finished the summer's tour in an electric wheelchair.

In 1985, Taylor received his first Grammy nomination in the "Best Male Gospel Performance" category, while also being nominated for Dove Awards as "Gospel Artist of the Year" and for Meltdown as the "Best Contemporary Album of the Year". Taylor and "Some Band" performed at the Dove Awards ceremonies in Nashville in April of that year, where they were introduced by Pat Boone.

Taylor followed that release with On the Fritz, produced by Foreigner's Ian McDonald. Fritz was Taylor's first album to use all studio musicians instead of his usual backing group. Some of the musicians who played on this album were George Small, Tony DaVilio, Hugh McCracken, Carmine Rojas, Larry Fast and Allen Childs. Fritz, keeping with Taylor tradition, took aim once again at religious leaders, such as Bill Gothard ("I Manipulate"), greedy TV evangelists (again) ("You Don't Owe Me Nothing"), politicians using religion or avoiding questions of morality in order to get votes ("It's a Personal Thing"), and public schools teaching "values clarification" to children, asking them to determine who should be thrown overboard in an overcrowded lifeboat ("Lifeboat").

Taylor also recorded a duet with Sheila Walsh, "Not Gonna Fall Away", a tune written and recorded in 1981 by David Edwards. This was released as a 12" single titled "Transatlantic Remixes". Taylor and Walsh embarked on the Transatlantic Tour which included dates in the United Kingdom and the United States.

Taylor and Walsh also participated in the recording of "Do Something Now" in 1985, a collaborative effort, similar to "We Are the World", to raise money for Compassion International's famine relief programs in Africa. Other artists participating included Amy Grant, Larry Norman, Russ Taff, Randy Stonehill, Mylon LeFevre, Steve Camp, Evie, Phil Keaggy, 2nd Chapter of Acts, Sandi Patty, Bill Gaither and Rick Cua.

In between performing, recording and touring, Taylor met and married Debbie Butler of Irvine, California. They were married by Taylor's father at a private ceremony in Connecticut. Mrs. Taylor designed the album cover for a compilation on Sparrow, The Best We Could Find (Plus 3 That Never Escaped) and Myrrh's I Predict 1990, as well as some of Taylor's more colorful stage costumes.

In 1987, Taylor once again lived up to his controversial reputation with a song called "I Blew Up the Clinic Real Good". The song criticizes anyone who claims to be an anti-abortion activist who would blow up abortion clinics or kill doctors. The point of the song was lost on many and resulted in Taylor's album, I Predict 1990, being pulled from the shelves at some Christian record stores. Taylor himself would occasionally call those stores to explain the song to them. With 1990, Taylor's targets included mainstream universities ("Since I Gave Up Hope I Feel a Lot Better", featuring fiddle work from Papa John Creach of Jefferson Airplane and Hot Tuna). Other tracks included "Jim Morrison's Grave", which once again brought Taylor some MTV exposure, and the Flannery O'Connor-inspired "Harder to Believe Than Not To". Some stores also pulled the album as they thought the cover looked like a tarot card.

Taylor's tour for I Predict was his most ambitious to date, bringing him to Australia, Canada, England, Finland, Hong Kong, Japan, New Zealand, Norway, Scotland, Sweden and the Philippines.

=== 1990s ===
Taylor then took a break from music until 1990, when he returned as the lead singer of Chagall Guevara. Their first recording was "Tale o' the Twister", which appeared on the soundtrack to the 1990 film Pump Up the Volume. The band released an album, the self-titled Chagall Guevara, in 1991 on MCA Records. A follow-up album was begun, but it was not finished until 2022 as part of a Kickstarter campaign. The band was released from its contract, following slow sales for their debut, and broke up.

Taylor returned with another solo album, Squint, and a live CD, Liver, in the mid-1990s. Squint included the track "Smug", which uses the persona of Rush Limbaugh as an apparent-example of smugness, and uses Barbra Streisand as an iconic master of apparent-smugness. The album also included the song "Cash Cow", which takes a jab at yet another televangelist, Robert Tilton, as well as "Bannerman", which is a tribute to American football fans who hold up "John 3:16" banners behind the goalposts.

A tribute to Taylor entitled I Predict a Clone: A Steve Taylor Tribute was released in 1994 that featured performances by Sixpence None the Richer, Fleming and John, Starflyer 59, Circle of Dust, and others.

In the years following those releases, Taylor focused his efforts on running Squint Entertainment and producing projects for other artists, including Sixpence None the Richer's self-titled 1997 release that featured the hit singles "Kiss Me" and a cover of The La's "There She Goes". He would be most noted for his work with Newsboys, co-producing five of the band's albums while making contributions to the band's songwriting. During this time, Taylor also directed and produced the Newsboys' 1996 movie Down Under the Big Top in which the band stars.

Taylor began working as a full-time film maker, directing music videos for Fleming and John, Rich Mullins, Sixpence None the Richer, Newsboys, Guardian, Twila Paris, Dakoda Motor Co., Out of the Grey, and two video albums for himself.

=== 2000s ===
While still running Squint, Taylor had begun a film project called St. Gimp, co-written with Ben Pearson and Willie Williams. That film was abandoned in 2001 when Squint Entertainment lost its financial backing and Taylor was forced out of the company. Taylor co-wrote and directed the feature film The Second Chance starring Michael W. Smith, released February 17, 2006. He also appeared in the documentary film Why Should the Devil Have All the Good Music? (released on DVD in 2006), in interview segments and performing part of "We Don't Need No Colour Code". New music was scarce, but Taylor did contribute one song, "Shortstop", to Squint's 2000 compilation Roaring Lambs. He also recorded "Yo Ho Hero", a collaborative track for the 2008 VeggieTales movie The Pirates Who Don't Do Anything.

=== 2010s ===
In 2010, Taylor began working on a film adaptation of Donald Miller's book Blue Like Jazz. Kickstarter donations helped finish the project, and the film was released theatrically on April 13, 2012, and on DVD/Blu-ray on August 7, 2012.

June 2011 saw the release of "Closer" (featuring Steve Taylor and Some Other Band), a collaboration with Peter Furler on his first solo album, On Fire. The group consisted of Taylor on vocals, Jimmy Abegg on guitar, John Mark Painter on bass, and Furler on drums. According to Furler, an entire album was recorded from these sessions, the material consisting of Taylor/Furler songs unused by the Newsboys. One track from the group, "A Life Preserved", was released August 7, 2012 on the Blue Like Jazz Motion Picture Soundtrack album and credited to Steve Taylor & The Perfect Foil. An "official remix" of "A Life Preserved" also surfaced at pastemagazine.com, and Taylor returned to the stage for Creation 2013 festival. A 2013 Kickstarter drive funded the band in studio and on the road.

A February 2014 Kickstarter update revealed previously completed studio work to be an album by tour co-headliner Peter Furler Band (released March 2014), with the four members of the Perfect Foil as producers. Soon after, Steve Taylor & The Perfect Foil announced via Kickstarter that their own new album Goliath was completed August 23, 2014. This marked Taylor's first studio album in twenty years. "Only a Ride", the debut single from the album, was released via streaming and mp3 download on September 16, 2014, only to Kickstarter campaign supporters. The music video for "Only a Ride" featured scenes from the film trailer for Stunt Rock, a 1980 film by director Brian Trenchard-Smith. Music videos for "Standing in Line" and the title track to Goliath followed. The album, distributed independently, through Taylor's own Splint Entertainment, was released on November 18, 2014. Plans for extensive touring were announced.

In June 2015, Taylor and the Perfect Foil entered Electrical Audio in Chicago with Daniel Smith of Danielson and engineer Steve Albini. In December 2015, Taylor announced (via Kickstarter) that the resulting EP, Wow to the Deadness, was released in January 2016, under the name Steve Taylor & The Danielson Foil.

Along with new music making, Taylor also had the honor of becoming filmmaker-in-residence at Lipscomb University's cinematic arts program. His roles would include assistant professor of film & creative media and director of the School of Theatre and Cinematic Arts. He would also begin development on another feature film, a political comedy: The Independent.

=== 2020s ===
On August 1, 2020, a live crowdfunding campaign was launched for the release of The Last Amen, the long-delayed Chagall Guevara live album. It was to be accompanied by a collection, Halcyon Days, to include rare and unreleased CG material as well as new recordings with Taylor's former band. The latter nine-track release was made available to Kickstarter backers in mid-May 2022, and was released to the public in June of that year. The band played one show together on July 2, 2022, to celebrate the release of the new album. CG would also support long-term collaborator Russ Taff in concert in June 2025.

== Discography ==
=== Studio albums ===
- Meltdown, 1984 album (Sparrow)
- On the Fritz, 1985 album (Sparrow)
- I Predict 1990, 1987 album (Myrrh)
- Squint, 1993 album (Warner Alliance)
- Goliath (with The Perfect Foil), 2014 album (Splint)

=== EPs ===
- I Want to Be a Clone, 1983 debut EP (Sparrow)
- Wow to the Deadness, 2016 EP (with The Danielson Foil) (Splint Entertainment/Sounds Familyre)

=== Live albums ===
- Limelight, 1986 live album (Sparrow)
- Liver, 1995 live album (Warner Alliance)
- Wow to the Liveness, 2016 live album (with The Danielson Foil) (Splint Entertainment/Sounds Familyre)
- The Last Amen, 2021 live album (with Chagall Guevara)

=== Compilations ===
- The Best We Could Find (+3 That Never Escaped), 1988 album (Sparrow)
- Christmas, 1988 album (one track by Taylor)
- Now The Truth Can Be Told, 1994 two-disc box set (WAL)
- Roaring Lambs Various Artists, 2000 compilation (one track by Taylor)
- The Pirates Who Don't Do Anything: A VeggieTales Movie Soundtrack, 2007 (one track by Taylor)
- Blue Like Jazz Motion Picture Soundtrack, 2012 (one track by Taylor; an alternate arrangement of this track can also be found on the Goliath album.)
- There's A Rainbow Somewhere (The Songs Of Randy Stonehill), various artists, 2022 – Song: "Fire"

=== With Chagall Guevara ===
- Chagall Guevara, 1991 album (MCA)
- Pump Up the Volume soundtrack, 1990, includes one song by Chagall Guevara, "Tale O' the Twister".
- "Treasure of the Broken Land" (single), 1992, included on the 1994 album Strong Hand of Love: A Tribute to Mark Heard and its 1996 re-release with more material Orphans of God.
- Halcyon Days, 2022 studio collection

=== Promotional singles ===
Year	Single	CCM peak chart positions			Album
Year	Single	AC	CHR	Rock	Album
1983	"I Want to Be a Clone"	—	—	3	I Want to Be a Clone
1984	"Sin for a Season"	—	—	1	Meltdown
1984	"Meltdown (At Madame Tussaud's)"	—	—	1	Meltdown
1984	"Guilty by Association"	—	—	16	Meltdown
1985	"This Disco (Used to Be a Cute Cathedral)"	—	3	1	On the Fritz
1985	"On the Fritz"	—	—	9	On the Fritz
1985	"Lifeboat"	—	—	—	On the Fritz
1986	"To Forgive"	—	—	8	On the Fritz
1986	"I Just Wanna Know"	5	5	—	On the Fritz
1987	"Svengali"	—	—	2	I Predict 1990
1988	"Harder to Believe Than Not To"	36	—	—	I Predict 1990
1988	"I Blew Up the Clinic Real Good"	—	—	5	I Predict 1990
1988	"What Is the Measure of Your Success?"	—	—	8	I Predict 1990
1988	"Under the Blood"	—	—	20	The Best We Could Find (+3 That Never Escaped)
1989	"Jim Morrison's Grave"	—	—	3	I Predict 1990
1991	"Violent Blue" (Chagall Guevara)	—	—	10	Chagall Guevara
1991	"Murder in the Big House" (Chagall Guevara)	—	—	1	Chagall Guevara
1992	"Escher's World" (Chagall Guevara)	—	—	4	Chagall Guevara
1992	"Play God" (Chagall Guevara)	—	—	7	Chagall Guevara
1992	"If It All Comes True" (Chagall Guevara)	—	—	4	Chagall Guevara
1993	"Bannerman"	—	5	1	Squint
1994	"The Lament of Desmond R.G. Underwood-Frederick IV"	—	—	1	Squint
1994	"The Finish Line"	—	—	2	Squint
1994	"Curses"	—	—	1	Squint
1995	"On the Fritz" (live)	—	—	6	Liver
2000	"Shortstop"	—	—	1	Roaring Lambs
2014	"Only a Ride" (Steve Taylor & The Perfect Foil)	—	—	—	Goliath
2014	"Standing in Line" (Steve Taylor & The Perfect Foil)	—	—	—	Goliath
2014	"Goliath" (Steve Taylor & The Perfect Foil)	—	—	—	Goliath
2015	"A Life Preserved" (Steve Taylor & The Perfect Foil)	—	—	—	Goliath
2015	"Moonshot" (Steve Taylor & The Perfect Foil)	—	—	—	Goliath
2016	"Wow to the Deadness" (Steve Taylor & The Danielson Foil)	—	—	—	Wow to the Deadness
2016	"Nonchalant" (Steve Taylor & The Danielson Foil)	—	—	—	Wow to the Deadness
2020	"Ecstatic Delight" (Steve Taylor & The Danielson Foil)	—	—	—	Electric Jesus (Soundtrack)
2022	"Resurrection #9" (Chagall Guevara)	—	—	—	Halcyon Days
2022	"Got Any Change?" (Chagall Guevara)	—	—	—	Halcyon Days
2022	"Fire"	—	—	—	There's a Rainbow Somewhere: The Songs of Randy Stonehill

=== Music videos ===
Year	Title	Album
1984	"Meltdown (At Madame Tussaud's)"	Meltdown
1984	"We Don't Need No Colour Code"	Meltdown
1985	"Lifeboat"	On the Fritz
1988	"What Is the Measure of Your Success?"	I Predict 1990
1988	"I Blew Up the Clinic Real Good"	I Predict 1990
1988	"A Principled Man"	I Predict 1990
1988	"Jim Morrison's Grave"	I Predict 1990
1988	"Babylon"	I Predict 1990
1988	"Svengali"	I Predict 1990
1988	"Since I Gave Up Hope I Feel a Lot Better"	I Predict 1990
1988	"Harder to Believe Than Not To"	I Predict 1990
1991	"Violent Blue" (Chagall Guevara)	Chagall Guevara
1993	"Bannerman"	Squint
1994	"Smug"	Squint
1994	"The Moshing Floor"	Squint
1994	"Jesus Is for Losers"	Squint
1994	"Sock Heaven"	Squint
1994	"Cash Cow (A Rock Opera in Three Small Acts)"	Squint
1994	"The Finish Line"	Squint
1995	"On the Fritz" (live)	Liver
2014	"Only a Ride" (Steve Taylor & The Perfect Foil)	Goliath
2014	"Standing in Line" (Steve Taylor & The Perfect Foil)	Goliath
2014	"Goliath" (Steve Taylor & The Perfect Foil)	Goliath
2015	"Moonshot" (Steve Taylor & The Perfect Foil)	Goliath
2016	"Wow to the Deadness" (Steve Taylor & The Danielson Foil)	Wow to the Deadness
2016	"Nonchalant" (Steve Taylor & The Danielson Foil)	Wow to the Deadness
2020	"Ecstatic Delight" (Steve Taylor & The Danielson Foil)	Electric Jesus (Music From and Inspired By the Motion Picture)

=== Video collections ===
- Videoworks, 1985 video collection (Sparrow)
- Limelight, 1986 live video (Sparrow)
- I Predict 1990: The Video Album, 1987 video collection (Myrrh)
- Squint: Movies From the Soundtrack, 1993 video collection (Warner Alliance)
- Now The Truth Can Be Told, 1994 video collection (WAL)

== Filmography ==
Title	Year	Credited as						Notes	Ref(s)
Title	Year	Director	Writer	Producer	Editor	Actor	Role	Notes	Ref(s)
Joe's Distributing	1980	Yes	Yes	Yes		Yes		Comedy short	
Nothing To Lose	1980	Yes	Yes	Yes		Yes		Comedy short	
Baby Talk	1982	Yes	Yes	Yes		Yes		Comedy short	
Greenbelt '88 on Super 8	1988	Yes	Yes	Yes		Yes	Himself	Documentary short	
Rich Mullins: Pursuit of a Legacy	1994			Yes	Yes		—N/a	Documentary	
Strong Hand of Love	1994					Yes	Himself	Documentary	
Down Under the Big Top	1996	Yes	Yes	Yes	Yes	Yes	Himself	Feature film	
Homeless Man: The Restless Heart of Rich Mullins	1998			Yes		Yes	Himself	Documentary	
The Cornerstone Festival: Twenty Years and Counting	2004					Yes	Himself	Documentary	
The Second Chance	2006	Yes	Yes	Yes			—N/a	Feature film	
Kabul 24	2009			Yes			—N/a	Documentary	
Adventure Now	2010					Yes	Elko	TV series	
Pound Dogs	2011					Yes	Yuppie Guy (voice)	Animated comedy short	
Blue Like Jazz	2012	Yes	Yes	Yes			—N/a	Feature film	
"Spy vs. Guy"	2013					Yes	Spy	Comedy short	
Sketch	2024			Yes				Feature film	
