= John Mark Painter =

American songwriter

- Born: October 6, 1967 (age 58)
- Genres: Rock; pop; alternative rock; experimental
- Occupations: Multi-instrumentalist, composer, arranger
- Instruments: Guitar; bass guitar; vocals; cello; double bass; trumpet; trombone; accordion; keyboards; saxophone; percussion
- Member of: Fleming and John; Steve Taylor & The Perfect Foil

John Mark Painter (born c. October 6 1967) is an American multi-instrumental musician, composer and arranger. He is best known for his role, with his wife, singer Fleming McWilliams, in the rock duo Fleming and John.

Painter grew up in Miami, and began playing trumpet, saxophone, bass, guitar and piano by age 11.

Painter met McWilliams while attending Belmont College in Nashville, and immediately began collaborating on songs. While pursuing a record contract, Painter began playing studio sessions for artists like Indigo Girls, Nanci Griffith and Jewel.

Fleming and John released its first album, Delusions of Grandeur, in 1995 for independent label R.E.X. Records, then Universal Records. Their second album, The Way We Are in 1999 notably showcased Painter's skills as arranger and as instrumentalist on a panoply of uncommon instruments.

Painter continues to work heavily in the Nashville area as a studio musician, performing on albums by Carolyn Arends, Ben Folds Five, Fear of Pop, Owsley, Rich Creamy Paint (Rich Painter, who is John Mark Painter's nephew), Sixpence None the Richer, Gabe Dixon Band, Sevendust, Jon Foreman, Frally Folds and others.

Also producing artist such as Shapiro, Pantana, and Alva Leigh for Dweeb Records at IHOF Studio.

Painter was the composer for the 2005 animated film "Hoodwinked", the 2006 film "The Second Chance" starring Michael W. Smith, and the VeggieTales DVD "The Wonderful Wizard of Ha's".

He is currently a member of the alternative rock band Steve Taylor & The Perfect Foil with Steve Taylor, Jimmy Abegg and Peter Furler. Their first album, Goliath was released in November 2014.
