= The Second Chance =

- Movie poster
- Directed by: Steve Taylor
- Written by: Chip Arnold; Henry O. Arnold; Ben Pearson; Steve Taylor
- Produced by: J. Clarke Gallivan; Coke Sams; Steve Taylor
- Starring: Michael W. Smith; Jeff Obafemi Carr; J. Don Ferguson; Lisa Arrindell Anderson
- Cinematography: Ben Pearson
- Edited by: Matthew Sterling
- Music by: John Mark Painter
- Distributed by: Triumph Films
- Release date: February 17, 2006
- Running time: 102 minutes
- Country: United States
- Language: English
- Budget: $1.2 million
- Box office: $463,542

The Second Chance is a 2006 drama film, directed by veteran musician Steve Taylor. The film won Best Feature Film at the Christian WYSIWYG Film Festival.

The film was released in the United States on February 17, 2006 to a limited number of theaters; the widest release was 87 theaters. As of its close date, March 5, 2006, the film had grossed $463,542.

== Plot summary ==
Ethan Jenkins (Michael W. Smith) is a pastor who enjoys working with his well-to-do congregation. At the request of his father, Ethan takes an assignment at Second Chance Church, where he meets Jake Sanders (Jeff Obafemi Carr), a pastor who lives in a completely different world from Ethan's, and spends much of his time dealing with poverty, drugs, and crime. The two different lifestyles of these two pastors cause an inevitable conflict as these two men try to bridge the divide.

== Cast ==
- Michael W. Smith as Ethan Jenkins
- Jeff Obafemi Carr as Jake Sanders
- J. Don Ferguson as Jeremiah Jenkins
- Lisa Arrindell as Amanda Sanders (as Lisa Arrindell Anderson)
- David Alford as Parker Richards
- Henry Haggard as Sonny
- Kenda Benward as Valerie
- Robert E. Fitzgerald II as Jamaal

== Nominations and awards ==
6th Annual Christian WYSIWYG Film Festival

- Winner, Best Feature Film

== Production notes ==
Taylor did not intend this film to be considered a Christian film. He told Christianity Today that "One of the reasons we've avoided the tag "Christian film" is because it's the kiss of death—it's not an apocalyptic thriller or a conversion story. It's a redemption story, set in the world of these two churches, and we wanted to tell an authentic story deep in those settings." This is the first film in which Michael W. Smith, a contemporary Christian musician, has acted.

The film was shot mostly on location in Nashville, Tennessee. The area was mainly in and around East Nashville between 2nd and 4th Avenues. One featured spot of note shows the front facade of the former Pearl Cohn Comprehensive High School at 17th Avenue and Jo Johnston.

== Soundtrack ==
No.	Title	Writer(s)	Performer	Length
1.	"Movin' on Up"	Bobby Gillespie, Andrew Innes	Third Day	3:31
2.	"All in the Serve"	Michael W. Smith	Michael W. Smith	2:53
3.	"Follow Me"		Andraé Crouch, Michael W. Smith	2:35
4.	"Refuge (When It's Cold Outside)"	Paul Cho, DeVon "Devo" Harris	John Legend	3:49
5.	"Nothing But the Blood"	Jars of Clay, Robert Lowry, Traditional	The Blind Boys of Alabama, Jars of Clay	4:11
6.	"Total Praise"	Richard Smallwood	Michael W. Smith	3:39
7.	"Footwashing"	Michael W. Smith	Michael W. Smith	2:03
8.	"Homeless Child"	Ben Harper	The Holmes Brothers	3:45
9.	"I Surrender All"	Judson W. Van DeVenter	Ruben Studdard	3:56
10.	"Hang On" (Pajam Remix)	Matt Bronleewe, Wes King, Michael W. Smith	Michael W. Smith, 21:03	3:59
11.	"The Last Hallelujah"	Michael W. Smith	Michael W. Smith	3:35
12.	"I'm Glad About It"	Fred Hammond, Juanita Wynn	Fred Hammond	3:52
13.	"Ethan Testifies"	Michael W. Smith	Michael W. Smith	1:20
14.	"The Solid Rock"	Edward Mote	Michael W. Smith	2:52
15.	"We Must Praise"	James Moss	J. Moss	5:10
16.	"On the Rooftop"	Michael W. Smith	Michael W. Smith	3:36
