= Squint (Steve Taylor album) =

Studio album by Steve Taylor
- Released: 1993
- Genres: Rock, CCM, hard rock, rock opera, reggae/ska
- Length: 43:24
- Label: Warner Alliance
- Producer: Steve Taylor

Steve Taylor chronology
I Predict 1990 (1987)	Squint (1993)	Liver (1995)

Professional ratings
Review scores
Source	Rating
AllMusic	4/5 stars
Cross Rhythms	10/10 stars

Squint is the fourth solo studio album by American singer/songwriter Steve Taylor, released in 1993 after his stint as lead singer of Chagall Guevara. It peaked at position 17 on the Billboard Top Contemporary Christian Album Chart. The most recent studio album released by Taylor as a solo artist, it was released to online music stores on November 16, 2018.

== Track listing ==
All songs written by Steve Taylor.

1. "The Lament of Desmond R.G. Underwood-Frederick IV" - 4:02
2. "Bannerman" - 3:14
3. "Smug" - 4:22
4. "Jesus Is for Losers" - 4:19
5. "The Finish Line" - 5:25
6. "The Moshing Floor" - 4:01
7. "Easy Listening" - 3:42
8. "Curses" - 3:55
9. "Sock Heaven" - 4:46
10. "Cash Cow (A Rock Opera In Three Small Acts)" - 5:38

== Personnel ==
Some Band

- Steve Taylor - vocals
- Wade Jaynes - bass(es), guitar on Act III of "Cash Cow"
- Jerry McPherson - guitars
- Mike Mead - drums
- Phil Madeira - keyboards, slide guitar and sampled percussion on "Sock Heaven" and backwards slide on "Cash Cow," The Last Voice You Hear on "Smug"

Additional musicians

- George Bradfute - guitars on "The Lament...", left speaker guitar and solo on "The Moshing Floor", additional guitars on Act III of "Cash Cow"
- Dave Perkins - rhythm guitar on "Bannerman" (including that catchy riff)
- Carl Marsh - strings on "The Finish Line" and "The Moshing Floor"
- Eric Darken -percussion instruments, tambourine on "Easy Listening" and "The Finish Line"
- Russ Long - remaining tambourines, electronic drums on "Easy Listening"
- Donna McElroy - vocals on "Sock Heaven"

Production notes

- Produced and written by Steve Taylor.
- Engineered by Russ Long.
- Mixed by David Bryson, assisted by Matt Murman.
- Made at The Salt Mine, Nashville.
- Mixed at Different Fur, San Francisco.
- Mastered by Bob Ludwig at Gateway Mastering, Portland.

== Charting ==
Chart	Peak position
US Top Christian Albums (Billboard)	17
