= Blue Like Jazz =

2003 memoir by Donald Miller

- First edition cover
- Author: Donald Miller
- Language: English
- Genre: Non-fiction, Memoir
- Publisher: Nelson
- Publication date: July 17, 2003
- Publication place: United States
- Media type: Print (Paperback)
- Pages: 256 pp
- ISBN: 0-7852-6370-5

Blue Like Jazz is the second book by Donald Miller. This semi-autobiographical work, subtitled "Non-Religious Thoughts on Christian Spirituality," is a collection of essays and personal reflections chronicling the author's growing understanding of the nature of God and Jesus, and the need and responsibility for an authentic personal response to that understanding. Much of the work centers on Miller's experiences with friends and fellow students while auditing courses at Reed College, a liberal arts college in Portland, Oregon. The book deals with inward spiritual dealings as Don, his friends Penny, Laura and others struggle with finding meaning in life and the ultimate battle with God ending with choosing him or choosing one's self.

The book's popularity is due to its personable style and content which most appeals to twentysomething and thirtysomething, post-modern Christians in the emerging church movement. His writings have often been compared to fellow Christian memoirist, Anne Lamott. It was named one of the 20 Best Books of the Decade by Paste Magazine.

The book has been made into a movie by director Steve Taylor. On his blog on September 16, 2010, Donald Miller stated that despite a strong screenplay, a stellar cast, and rave reviews, the project was put on hold indefinitely due to lack of funding. Two fans created a site called "Save Blue Like Jazz" where they urged fans to help raise money to fund the movie through Kickstarter. This campaign raised over $340,000, more than doubling the original goal of $125,000 by October 25, 2010.

== Film adaptation ==
With a cast including Justin Welborn, Marshall Allman, and Claire Holt, a screen adaptation was filmed in Portland, Oregon and Nashville, Tennessee and released on April 13, 2012.

== Quotations ==
- "I was watching BET one night, and they were interviewing a man about jazz music. He said jazz music was invented by the first generation out of slavery. I thought that was beautiful because, while it is music, it is very hard to put on paper; it is so much more a language of the soul ... The first generation out of slavery invented jazz music. It is a music birthed out of freedom. And that is the closest thing I know to Christian spirituality. A music birthed out of freedom. Everybody sings their song the way they feel it, everybody closes their eyes and lifts up their hands."
- "The most difficult lie I ever contended with is this: Life is a story about me."
- "I think every conscious person, every person that is awake to the functioning principles within his reality, has a moment where he stops blaming the problems in the world on group think, on humanity and authority, and starts to face himself. I hate this more than anything. This is the hardest principle within Christian spirituality for me to deal with. The problem is not out there; the problem is the needy beast of a thing that lives in my chest."
- "My most recent faith struggle is not one of intellect. I don't really do that anymore. Sooner or later you just figure out there are some guys who don't believe in God and they can prove He doesn't exist, and some other guys who do believe in God and they can prove He does exist, and the argument stopped being about God a long time ago and now it's about who is smarter, and honestly I don't care."
