= The Essential Van Morrison =

2015 album by Van Morrison

Compilation album by Van Morrison
- Released: August 28, 2015
- Recorded: 1969
- Genre: Rock, pop
- Length: 2:36:54
- Label: Legacy Records (Aus), Sony Music Japan
- Producer: Dick Rowe, Lewis Merenstein, Van Morrison, Ted Templeman, Mick Glossop, Georgie Fame

Van Morrison chronology
| Duets: Re-working the Catalogue (2015) | The Essential Van Morrison (2015) | Keep Me Singing (2016) |

The Essential Van Morrison is a two-disc compilation album by Northern Irish singer-songwriter Van Morrison, released on August 28, 2015. It is part of Sony BMG's Essential series of compilation albums and includes tracks from Morrison's solo output, as well as tracks from his days with Them. The tracks consist of some of Morrison's biggest hits and popular album tracks from 1964 as leader of the Northern Irish band Them through his 2009 release Astral Weeks Live at the Hollywood Bowl. The liner notes were contributed by David Fricke.

== Reception ==
Professional ratings
Review scores
| Source | Rating |
|---|---|
| AllMusic | 4.5/5 stars |
| All About Jazz | 4/5 stars |
| American Songwriter | 4.5/5 stars |

The Green Man Review says that the Northern Irish singer and songwriter has spent the past 50 years fusing American jazz, pop, blues, soul and rhythm & blues with Anglo-Irish folk music to create something that's been dubbed Celtic Soul. The Essential is a two-disc, 37-track collection from Sony Legacy celebrates that half-century of song, as part of a huge new reissue project.

Vintage Rock says that with the Essential Van Morrison is a double-disc, 37-track career-spanning anthology that kicks things off in grand style as a thorough introduction to Van Morrison. It all starts with those early Them nuggets like "Gloria" and "Here Comes The Night" before moving onto to Morrsion's first solo hit "Brown Eyed Girl." Of course, "Astral Weeks," the title track of his second solo album changed the game entirely, leading to a career of musical exploration that transcends those early R&B and pop flavorings to more organic strains of country music, jazz, Celtic folk and rock.

Roz Milner from Bearded Gentlemen Music says:

What is about Van Morrison that inspires such loyalty and passion? While I'm sure there are a casual Van fans, most people I know either fall into two camps: they know of him, but just a couple of the big singles or they're hopelessly in love with the man's music.

When I say hopelessly in love, I mean absolutely, completely, in-over-their-head and hopeless kinda love. I’ve traded emails with a guy who keeps track of what music he listens to and he's literally listened to Van Morrison thousands of times. I know people who collect albums, outtake compilations and bootlegs for the guy.

== Track listing ==
=== Disc one ===
| No. | Title | Writer(s) | Originally from | Length |
|---|---|---|---|---|
| 1. | "Gloria" (with Them) | Van Morrison | The Angry Young Them (1965) | 2:38 |
| 2. | "Here Comes the Night" (with Them) | Bert Berns | Non-album single (1965) | 2:46 |
| 3. | "Spanish Rose" | Van Morrison | Blowin' Your Mind! (1967) | 3:06 |
| 4. | "Brown Eyed Girl" | Van Morrison | Blowin' Your Mind! (1967) | 3:05 |
| 5. | "Astral Weeks" | Van Morrison | Astral Weeks (1968) | 7:03 |
| 6. | "The Way Young Lovers Do" | Van Morrison | Astral Weeks (1968) | 3:12 |
| 7. | "Moondance" | Van Morrison | Moondance (1970) | 4:34 |
| 8. | "Crazy Love" | Van Morrison | Moondance (1970) | 2:35 |
| 9. | "And It Stoned Me" | Van Morrison | Moondance (1970) | 4:31 |
| 10. | "Into the Mystic" | Van Morrison | Moondance (1970) | 3:26 |
| 11. | "Domino" | Van Morrison | His Band and the Street Choir (1970) | 3:08 |
| 12. | "Wild Night" | Van Morrison | Tupelo Honey (1971) | 3:34 |
| 13. | "Tupelo Honey" | Van Morrison | Tupelo Honey (1971) | 6:56 |
| 14. | "Jackie Wilson Said (I'm in Heaven When You Smile)" | Van Morrison | Saint Dominic's Preview (1972) | 2:59 |
| 15. | "Warm Love" | Van Morrison | Hard Nose the Highway (1973) | 3:23 |
| 16. | "Fair Play" | Van Morrison | Veedon Fleece (1974) | 6:16 |
| 17. | "Caravan" (recorded live on November 25, 1976 at the Winterland Ballroom with The Band) | Van Morrison | The Last Waltz (1978) (Note: "Caravan" originally appeared on the album Moondance (1970).) | 5:46 |
| 18. | "Hungry For Your Love" | Van Morrison | Wavelength (1978) | 3:45 |
| 19. | "Cleaning Windows" (recorded live in March 1983 at the Grand Opera House, Belfast) | Van Morrison | Live at the Grand Opera House Belfast (1984) (Note: Van Morrison's studio recording of "Cleaning Windows" is found on the album Beautiful Vision (1982).) | 4:22 |
| Total length: | | | | 1:17:16 |

=== Disc two ===
| No. | Title | Writer(s) | Originally from | Length |
|---|---|---|---|---|
| 1. | "Bright Side of the Road" | Van Morrison | Into the Music (1979) | 3:44 |
| 2. | "And the Healing Has Begun" | Van Morrison | Into the Music (1979) | 7:59 |
| 3. | "Tore Down a la Rimbaud" | Van Morrison | A Sense of Wonder (1985) | 4:07 |
| 4. | "Someone Like You" | Van Morrison | Poetic Champions Compose (1987) | 4:04 |
| 5. | "Irish Heartbeat" (with The Chieftains) | Van Morrison | Irish Heartbeat (1988) | 3:52 |
| 6. | "Whenever God Shines His Light" (featuring Cliff Richard) | Van Morrison | Avalon Sunset (1989) | 4:54 |
| 7. | "Have I Told You Lately" | Van Morrison | Avalon Sunset (1989) | 4:19 |
| 8. | "Real Real Gone" | Van Morrison | Enlightenment (1990) | 3:38 |
| 9. | "Enlightenment" | Van Morrison | Enlightenment (1990) | 4:05 |
| 10. | "Why Must I Always Explain?" | Van Morrison | Hymns to the Silence (1991) | 3:51 |
| 11. | "Days Like This" | Van Morrison | Days Like This (1995) | 3:11 |
| 12. | "That's Life" (featuring Georgie Fame) | Dean Kay, Kelly Gordon | How Long Has This Been Going On (1995) (Note: "That's Life" was originally recorded in 1963 by Marion Montgomery and was made famous by Frank Sinatra's hit 1966 version.) | 3:48 |
| 13. | "Rough God Goes Riding" | Van Morrison | The Healing Game (1997) | 6:15 |
| 14. | "Precious Time" | Van Morrison | Back on Top (1999) | 3:45 |
| 15. | "Once in a Blue Moon" | Van Morrison | What's Wrong with This Picture? (2003) | 3:28 |
| 16. | "Magic Time" | Van Morrison | Magic Time (2005) | 5:05 |
| 17. | "Playhouse" | Van Morrison | Pay the Devil (2006) | 4:11 |
| 18. | "Sweet Thing" (recorded live on November 7/8 2008 at the Hollywood Bowl) | Van Morrison | Astral Weeks Live at the Hollywood Bowl (2009) | 5:33 |
| Total length: | | | | 1:19:58 |

Download and streaming bonus track
| No. | Title | Writer(s) | Originally from | Length |
|---|---|---|---|---|
| 19. | "Close Enough for Jazz" (with Joey DeFrancesco) | Van Morrison | You're Driving Me Crazy (2018) | 3:45 |

== Personnel ==
- Van Morrison – vocals, guitar, rhythm guitar, harmonica, tambourine, backing vocals, production,
- Al Gorgoni and Hugh McCracken – guitars
- Jay Berliner – classical and steel-string acoustic guitars
- Barry Kornfeld – acoustic guitar on "The Way Young Lovers Do"
- Eric Gale – lead guitar
- Russ Savakus - bass guitar
- Richard Davis – double bass
- Paul Griffin – piano
- Garry Sherman – organ, conductor, actual arranger, musical supervisor
- The Sweet Inspirations – back-up vocals for "Brown Eyed Girl"
- Gary Chester – drums
- Connie Kay – drums
- Warren Smith Jr. – percussion, vibraphone

Them (track one)

- Peter Bardens – piano, organ
- Billy Harrison – guitar
- Alan Henderson – bass
- John McAuley – drums, piano, harmonica

== Charts ==
| Chart (2015) | Peak position |
|---|---|
| Australia ARIA Charts | 23 |
| Belgian Ultratop | 176 |
| Dutch Album Top 100 | 88 |
| New Zealand Recorded Music NZ | 6 |
| Spanish Productores de Música de España | 82 |
| US Billboard 200 | 101 |

| Chart (2024) | Peak position |
|---|---|
| Canadian Albums (Billboard) | 86 |

== Release history ==
| Country | Date | Label | Format |
|---|---|---|---|
| Worldwide | August 28, 2015 | Sony Music, Legacy Records | CD, digital download |

== Certifications ==
| Region | Certification | Certified units/sales |
|---|---|---|
| Australia (ARIA) | Gold | 35,000^{‡} |
| United Kingdom (BPI) | Platinum | 300,000^{‡} |
^{‡} Sales+streaming figures based on certification alone.
