= Paul Moran (musician) =

Background information
- Genres: Rock; rhythm and blues; blues; jazz
- Occupation: Musician
- Instruments: Hammond organ; piano; synths; trumpet; flugelhorn
- Website: paulmoran.info

Paul Moran is a Hammond organist, pianist, trumpeter, composer and arranger.

== Career ==
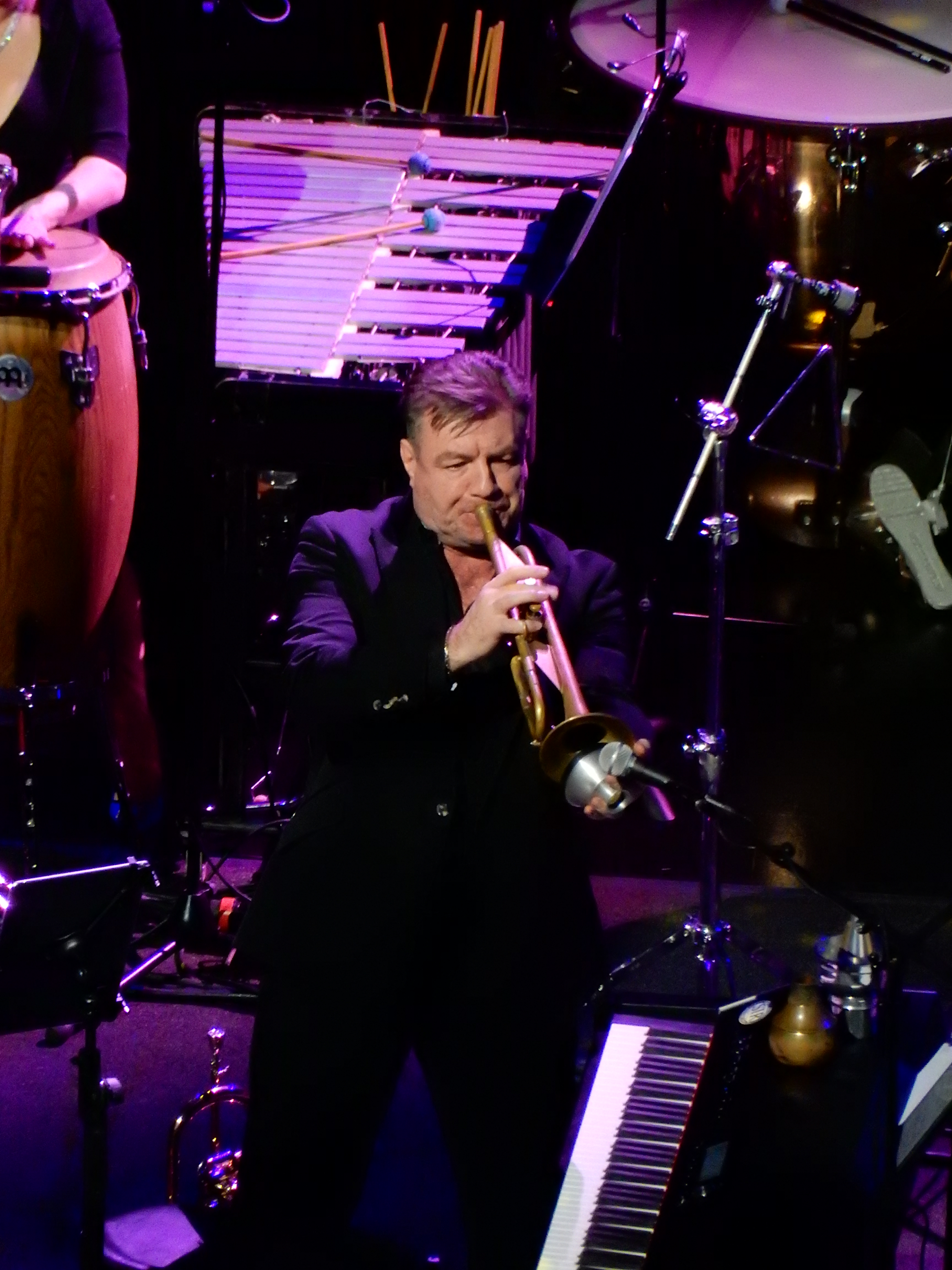
Moran on trumpet in 2018

=== Compositions ===
Paul Moran started composing commercially for Warner/Chappell in 1988. On making the move to London in 1989, his composing career soared, and he became virtually 'in-house' composer and arranger for Andre Jaquemin's Redwood Studios in Camden Town, London, home of the Monty Python team.

During the 1990s, Moran's compositions were used on such TV shows around the world as: The Oprah Winfrey Show, The Jay Leno Show, Emmerdale Farm and Coronation Street, selected from Warner Chappell Music Library catalogue. His music continues to be used globally, featuring recently for BBC World News (Marilyn Monroe Commemoration feature 2016), Polish films and Canadian films.

During the mid 1990s, Moran was composing and recording for Bronski Beat and Toyah at Bucks Music in Notting hill Gate. Collaborating with North London producer Martin Rex in the early 2000s, Moran wrote many popular TV ads, including such popular brands as Persil, Dove, Tetley Bitter and Andrex, commissioned by Saatchi & Saatchi.

In 2000, Moran embarked on a solo career, composing over half of the tracks on his debut jazz organ album Smokin' B3, reaching number 8 in the HMV British jazz charts in 2000. It led to famous Hammond Organ icon Jimmy McGriff describing Moran as the 'real deal'—as quoted on the front cover of the CD.. Following the success of that album, Moran continues to release new jazz albums under his own name, his last album Tribute To Blue Note (2015), while also writing music scores for such artists as: Van Morrison (recordings as mentioned previously), Tony Hadley (Passing Strangers, 2006), Wishbone Ash (keyboard arrangements on the acoustic album Bare Bones, 2009), and the Paul O'Grady Christmas Show (ITV 1, 2010), whilst also contributing to the music score for the movie Leo (2002) starring Dennis Hopper and Joseph Fiennes, and the Terry Gilliam movie Tidelands (2005) starring Jeff Bridges. Moran co-wrote the music for the first series of the hit TV comedy One Foot In The Grave with Andre Jaquemin and Dave Howman (December 1989). The first episode was aired 4 January 1990.

=== With Van Morrison ===
He is currently musical director to Van Morrison since 2006, both touring and recording, and has appeared as keyboard player and trumpeter on these Van Morrison albums.

- Astral Weeks Live at the Hollywood Bowl (2008)
- Born to Sing: No Plan B (2012)
- Duets: Re-working the Catalogue(2015)
- Keep Me Singing (2016)
- Roll with the Punches (2017)

=== Other ventures ===
Prior to working with Van Morrison – Paul Moran has also featured on the following recordings:

- Bare Bones – Wishbone Ash
- Passing Strangers – Tony Hadley
- Dreamchild – Toyah
- "Small Town Boy" (single) – Bronski Beat
- Let The Madness In – Kim Fowley
- CopaCabana – Cast Album – Barry Manilow

== Discography ==
AllMusic credits

=== Solo discography ===
- Smokin B3
- Nu Smooth
- Piano Moods
- Blue Note Tribute
- "Smokin' B3 VOL. 2 (Still Smoking')" (2017)

=== With Van Morrison ===
- Astral Weeks Live at the Hollywood Bowl (2008)
- Born to Sing: No Plan B (2012)
- Duets: Re-working the Catalogue(2015)
- Keep Me Singing (2016)
- Roll with the Punches (2017)

=== Other artists ===
- "Bare Bones (Wishbone Ash album)" – Wishbone Ash
- "Passing Strangers" – Tony Hadley (2006)
- "Let The Madness In" – Kim Fowley (1995)
- "Copacabana: Original London Cast Recording" – Barry Manilow (1994)
- "Dreamchild" – Toyah (band) (1997)
- "Small Town Boy" (Single) – Bronski Beat (1994)

== TV and film ==
Paul Moran has appeared on a number of TV programs and films

- Paul O'Grady – Christmas Special (ITV1 2010)
- One Foot In The Grave – (Series 1 1990) Incidental Music
- This Morning – Tony Hadley (ITV 1)
- Children In Need – Tony Hadley (BBC 1)
- Leo Additional Music
- Tidelands Additional Music
