= List of awards and nominations received by Van Morrison =

Van Morrison awards and nominations
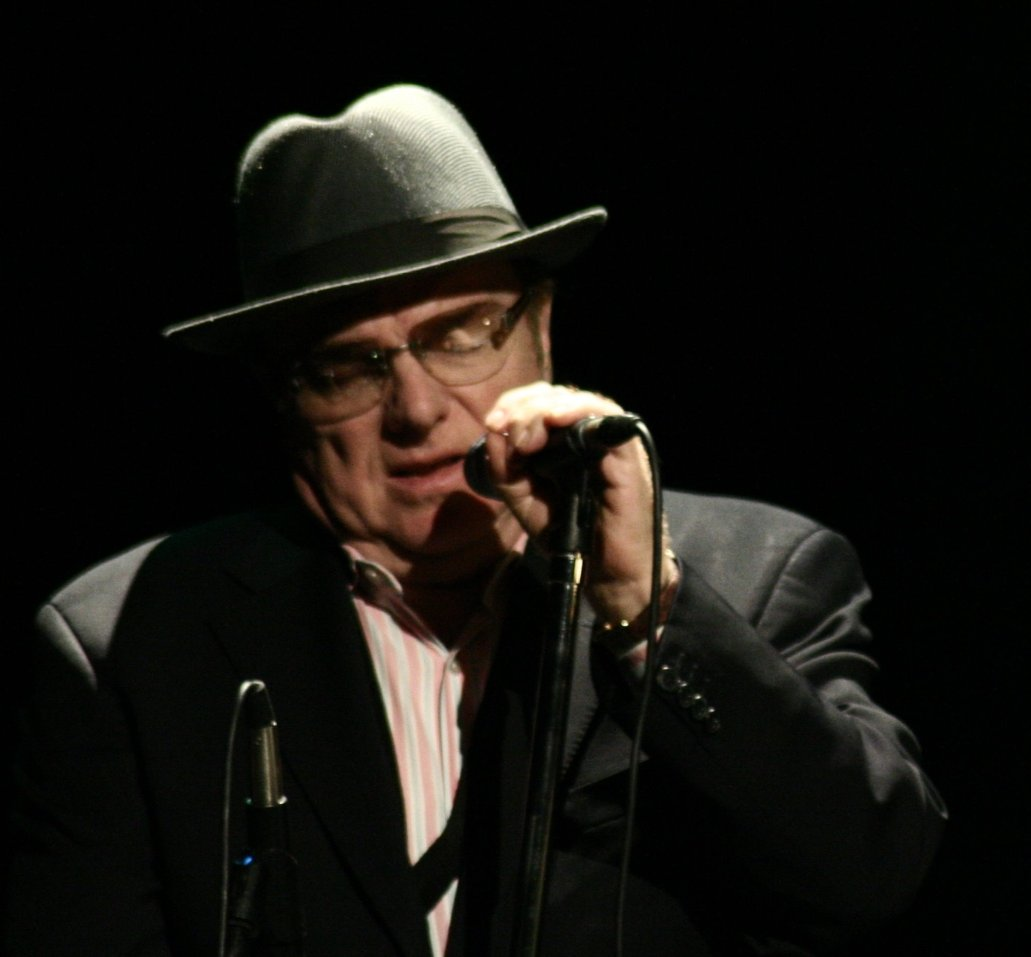
- Morrison at Marin Civic Center, 2007
Awards and nominations
Award	Wins	Nominations
Grammy Awards	2	7
Brit Awards	1	8
Grammy Hall of Fame Award	4	4
Rock and Roll Hall of Fame	1	1
Songwriters Hall of Fame	1	1
Irish Music Hall of Fame	1	1
Ivor Novello	1	1
BMI Icon Award	1	1
Q Award	1	1
Academy Awards	0	1

Totals (Note: Certain award groups do not simply award one winner. They acknowledge several different recipients, have runners-up, and have third place. Since this is a specific recognition and is different from losing an award, runner-up mentions are considered wins in this award tally. For simplification and to avoid errors, each award in this list has been presumed to have had a prior nomination.)
- Wins: 13
- Nominations: 25

This is a list of awards and nominations received by the Northern Irish singer-songwriter and musician Van Morrison. He first came to prominence in 1964 as the frontman of the band Them, for which he wrote the garage rock classic "Gloria". As a solo performer he wrote and recorded the pop hit song "Brown Eyed Girl" in 1967. As of 2010, he has recorded and released thirty-three studio albums and six live albums, winning many prestigious awards and nominations in the process.

== Academy Awards ==
The Academy Awards are presented annually by the Academy of Motion Picture Arts and Sciences and celebrates artistic and technical merit in the film industry. Morrison was nominated for "Down to Joy", from the movie Belfast.

Year	Nominee / work	Award	Result	Ref.
2022	"Down to Joy"	Best Original Song	Nominated	

== Americana Music Honors & Awards ==
The Americana Music Honors & Awards are presented annually by the Americana Music Association and celebrates distinguished members of the Americana music community. Americana music encompasses a wide variety of roots genres including rock and roll, country, folk, r&b and blues. The ceremony features several "of the year" awards and five lifetime achievement honors among others.

Year	Nominee / work	Award	Result	Ref.
2017	Van Morrison	Lifetime Achievement Award for Songwriting	Won	

== Grammy Awards ==
The Grammy Awards are presented annually by the National Academy of Recording Arts and Sciences of the United States for outstanding achievements in the music industry. Morrison has been nominated for a Grammy Award for five songs, winning the award for two of them. Two albums have received a nomination.

Year	Nominee / work	Award	Result	Ref.
1982	"Scandinavia"	Best Rock Instrumental Performance	Nominated	
1988	"Irish Heartbeat"	Best Traditional Folk Recording	Nominated	
1994	"In the Garden"/ "You Send Me"/"Allegeny	Best Rock Vocal Performance - Male	Nominated	
1995	"Have I Told You Lately That I Love You?"	Best Pop Collaboration With Vocals	Won	
1997	"Don't Look Back"	Best Pop Collaboration With Vocals	Won	
1998	"Shenandoah"	Best Pop Collaboration With Vocals	Nominated	
2004	What's Wrong with This Picture?	Best Contemporary Blues Album	Nominated	

== Grammy Hall of Fame ==
The Grammy Hall of Fame is a special Grammy award established in 1973 to honour recordings that are at least twenty-five years old and that have "qualitative or historical significance." Two albums and two songs by Morrison were inducted into the Grammy Hall of Fame, three in 1999 and one in 2007.

Year	Nominee / work	Award	Result	Ref.
1999	Astral Weeks	Grammy Hall of Fame	Inducted	
1999	"Gloria"	Grammy Hall of Fame	Inducted	
1999	Moondance	Grammy Hall of Fame	Inducted	
2007	"Brown Eyed Girl"	Grammy Hall of Fame	Inducted	

== Brit Awards ==
Brit Awards are held annually and were created by the British Phonographic Industry. Morrison has been nominated 8 times, receiving 1 award for "Outstanding Contribution".

Year	Nominee / work	Award	Result	Ref.
1990	"Van Morrison"	Best British Male	Nomination	
1991	"Van Morrison"	Best British Male	Nomination	
1991	Enlightenment	Best British Album	Nomination	
1992	"Van Morrison"	Best British Male	Nomination	
1994	"Van Morrison"	Best British Male	Nomination	
1994	"Van Morrison"	Outstanding Contribution	Won	
1996	"Van Morrison"	Best British Male	Nomination	
2000	"Van Morrison"	Best British Male	Nomination	

== Rock and Roll Hall of Fame ==
The Rock and Roll Hall of Fame which held its first induction ceremony in 1986 inducts a handful of artists into the Hall of Fame in an annual induction ceremony. Groups or individuals are qualified for induction 25 years after the release of their first record. Nominees should have demonstrable influence and significance within the history of rock and roll. Morrison was inducted 26 years after his first solo hit single, "Brown Eyed Girl".

Year	Nominee / work	Award	Result	Ref.
1993	"Van Morrison"	Rock and Roll Hall of Fame	Inducted	

== Songwriters Hall of Fame ==
The Songwriters Hall of Fame, an arm of the National Academy of Popular Music, was founded in 1969 and holds an annual induction ceremony in New York City. Morrison was inducted in 2003.

Year	Nominee / work	Award	Result	Ref.
2003	"Van Morrison"	Songwriters Hall of Fame	Inducted	

== Irish Music Hall of Fame ==
The Irish Music Hall of Fame opened in 1999 and recognised what it described as the best of Irish musical talent of all types over the decades. Morrison was the first musician to be inducted.

Year	Nominee / work	Award	Result	Ref.
1999	"Van Morrison"	Irish Music Hall of Fame	Inducted	

== BMI ICON Award ==
The BMI ICON Awards were established in 2002 by Broadcast Music Incorporated to recognize the "unique and indelible influence on generations of music makers". Morrison was given the award in 2004.

Year	Nominee / work	Award	Result	Ref.
2004	"Van Morrison"	BMI ICON Award	Won	

== Ivor Novello Awards ==
The Ivor Novello Awards are presented annually in London by the British Academy of Composers and Songwriters. Morrison received an award in 1995.

Year	Nominee / work	Award	Result	Ref.
1995	"Van Morrison"	Lifetime Achievement Award	Won	

== Q Awards ==
The Q Awards are awarded annually by Q magazine. Morrison won an award in 1995.

Year	Nominee / work	Award	Result	Ref.
1995	"Van Morrison"	Songwriter	Won	

== Mercury Prize ==
The Mercury Prize is an annual music prize awarded for the best album from the United Kingdom and Ireland. It was established by the British Phonographic Industry and British Association of Record Dealers. One of Morrison's albums was nominated in 1995.

Year	Nominee / work	Award	Result	Ref.
1995	Days Like This	Album of the Year	Nominated	

== Rock and Roll Hall of Fame's 500 Songs that Shaped Rock and Roll ==
The Rock and Roll Hall of Fame's 500 Songs that Shaped Rock and Roll is an unordered list of 500 songs that they believe have been most influential in shaping the course of rock and roll. Three of Morrison's songs are on the listing.

Year	Nominee / work	Award	Result	Ref.
	"Brown Eyed Girl"	The Rock and Roll Hall of Fame's 500 Songs that Shaped Rock and Roll	Included	
	"Madame George"	The Rock and Roll Hall of Fame's 500 Songs that Shaped Rock and Roll	Included	
	"Moondance"	The Rock and Roll Hall of Fame's 500 Songs that Shaped Rock and Roll	Included	

== Other awards and lists of greatests ==
Year	Award
Time, "All-Time 100 Albums"
	Moondance ranked in the "100 greatest albums of all time" list
Astral Weeks ranked in the "100 greatest albums of all time" list
VH1, "100 Greatest Artists of Rock and Roll"
2000	"Van Morrison" ranked 25
Rolling Stone, "100 Greatest Artists of All Time"
2004	"Van Morrison" ranked 42
Paste, "100 Greatest Living Songwriters"
2006	"Van Morrison" ranked 20
WXPN, "885 All Time Greatest Artists"
2006	"Van Morrison" ranked 14
Q, "100 Greatest Singers"
2007	"Van Morrison" ranked 20
Rolling Stone, "100 Greatest Singers of All Time"
2008	"Van Morrison" ranked 24
Rolling Stone, "The 500 Greatest Albums of All Time"
2003	Moondance ranked 65
2003	Astral Weeks ranked 19
Rolling Stone, "The 500 Greatest Songs of All Time"
2004	"Brown Eyed Girl" ranked 109
2004	"Gloria", with Them ranked 208
2004	"Moondance" ranked 226
2004	"Into the Mystic" ranked 474
Orders and Honors
1996	Induction into the Order of the British Empire
1996	Induction into the Ordre des Arts et des Lettres
1996	Honorary doctorate in literature from the University of Ulster
1996	Honorary doctorate in music from Queen's University Belfast
2013	Freedom of Belfast

Morrison is critically acclaimed to be one of the greatest artists in music history and has often appeared in numerous well-known "greatest" lists: VH1 (25), Rolling Stone (42), WXPN (14) and Paste (20). His voice was also voted in some lists to be one of the greatest in music: Q (20) and Rolling Stone (24). Time included the albums Moondance and Astral Weeks on its list. On the Rolling Stone list, Moondance was ranked number 65 and Astral Weeks at number 19. In 2004, Rolling Stone published a list of "The 500 Greatest Songs of All Time", voted on by numerous musical artists and music critics. Three of Morrison's songs were included and ranked: "Moondance" (226), "Gloria" (208) (with Them) and "Brown Eyed Girl" (109). In 2010, Rolling Stone released an updated list, which including more songs from the 21st century; "Into the Mystic", from the album Moondance, was added and ranked at number 474.
