= Roll with the Punches (Van Morrison album) =

Studio album by Van Morrison
- Released: 22 September 2017
- Recorded: 2017
- Genres: Rock, Americana
- Length: 63:14
- Label: Caroline
- Producer: Van Morrison

Van Morrison chronology
Keep Me Singing (2016)	Roll with the Punches (2017)	Versatile (2017)

Professional ratings
Review scores
Source	Rating
AllMusic	4/5 stars
PopMatters	7/10 stars
Slant Magazine	4/5 stars

Roll with the Punches is the 37th studio album by Northern Irish singer-songwriter Van Morrison, released on 22 September 2017 by Caroline Records. It features Jeff Beck on guitar, and charted in the Top 10 in five countries, and the Top 40 in a further six, including the US. It is his first album entirely composed of blues songs, both classic and original.

Guests on the album include Jeff Beck on electric guitar, Georgie Fame on Hammond organ and vocals, Paul Moran also on Hammond organ and trumpet, Paul Jones on harmonica and vocals and Chris Farlowe on vocals.

== Background and launch ==
The album consists of five original songs and ten covers. The cover originally featured former professional wrestler and Mohawk chief Billy Two Rivers, who sued the singer and the label, Universal Music Group, claiming that they did not seek permission to use his likeness. The parties agreed to settle out of court, and the cover was replaced, to feature Omagh boxer William Mitchel and Phil Townley, boxer and Muay Thai master from Bangor, County Down

On 25 September, Morrison spoke to Paul Jones - who is a guest musician on the album - on his BBC Radio 2 show to coincide with its release. When Morrison received the Lifetime Achievement Award for Songwriting from Emmylou Harris at the 2017 Americana Music Honors & Awards ceremony, he performed "Transformation", from the album. He has said that the inspiration for the song came from encountering the Californian Christian community, Agape.

== Critical reception ==
Pitchfork says that Roll with the Punches is "a thorough exploration of the blues", the first time Morrison has dedicated an entire album to that genre. Hailing it as "crisp, precise", it "reveals [Morrison's] ability to inhabit classic songs while paying respect to their form." Slate finds that it "plays like a party album", and in departing from "his trademark blend of jazz, folk, and Celtic soul" is Morrison's "most distinctive album since 2006’s country covers collection Pay the Devil". Greil Marcus called it "a tremendous rebound from his last few albums," writing that Morrison "makes Sam Cooke’s 'Bring It on Home to Me' feel like it has a hundred years ahead of it."

== Track listing ==
No.	Title	Writer(s)	Length
1.	"Roll with the Punches"	Van Morrison, Don Black	3:58
2.	"Transformation"	Van Morrison	3:31
3.	"I Can Tell"	Ellas McDaniel, Samuel Smith	3:51
4.	"Stormy Monday / Lonely Avenue"	T-Bone Walker / Doc Pomus	5:30
5.	"Goin' to Chicago"	Count Basie, Jimmy Rushing	5:22
6.	"Fame"	Van Morrison	5:06
7.	"Too Much Trouble"	Van Morrison	3:04
8.	"Bring It On Home to Me"	Sam Cooke	5:39
9.	"Ordinary People"	Van Morrison	4:41
10.	"How Far from God"	Sister Rosetta Tharpe	3:47
11.	"Teardrops from My Eyes"	Rudy Toombs	3:53
12.	"Automobile Blues"	Samuel Hopkins	3:39
13.	"Benediction"	Mose Allison	3:12
14.	"Mean Old World"	T-Bone Walker	4:59
15.	"Ride On Josephine"	Ellas McDaniel	3:02
Total length:			63:14

== Personnel ==
Credits adapted from AllMusic.

=== Musicians ===
- Van Morrison – vocals, electric guitar, harmonica, percussion, saxophone
- Chris Farlowe – vocals (2–4, 9)
- Georgie Fame – vocals, Hammond organ (5, 11)
- Paul Jones – vocals, harmonica (6)
- Jeff Beck – electric guitar (2–4, 8, 9)
- Ned Edwards – electric guitar, harmonica, background vocals (12, 14, 15)
- Dave Keary – acoustic and electric guitar, background vocals
- Pete Hurley – electric bass (2, 11, 12, 14, 15)
- Laurence Cottle – electric bass (1–4, 7–10, 13)
- Paul Moore – electric bass (6)
- Chris Hill – double bass (5)
- Jason Rebello – piano (2, 7, 8, 11, 13)
- Stuart McIlroy – piano, vocals, harmonica (1, 3, 4, 9, 10, 12, 14, 15)
- Joseph Jordan-Richardson – organ, Piano, pig skin drums
- Paul Moran – Hammond organ, trumpet (5)
- Sumudu Jayatilaka – background vocals
- Dana Masters – background vocals
- Elizabeth Williams – background vocals
- Mez Clough – drums (1–4, 6–11, 13, 15), percussion (6), backing vocals (2–4, 8, 11, 15)
- James Powell – drums (5)
- Colin Griffin – drums (12, 14, 15)
- Dan Ellis – percussion

=== Technical ===
- Dick Beetham – mastering
- Poppy Kavanagh – assistant engineer
- Rowan McIntosh – assistant engineer
- Gerry McLernon – engineer, mixing
- Phil Parsons – assistant engineer
- Patrick Phillips – assistant engineer
- Tristan Powell – engineer, mixing
- Will Purton – assistant, assistant engineer, engineer, mixing
- Matt Tait – engineer, mixing
- Richard Wade – photography
- Enda Walsh – engineer, mixing

== Charts ==
=== Weekly charts ===
Chart (2017)	Peak position
Australian Albums (ARIA)	11
Austrian Albums (Ö3 Austria)	9
Belgian Albums (Ultratop Flanders)	9
Belgian Albums (Ultratop Wallonia)	125
Canadian Albums (Billboard)	26
Dutch Albums (Album Top 100)	13
French Albums (SNEP)	174
German Albums (Offizielle Top 100)	5
Irish Albums (IRMA)	7
Italian Albums (FIMI)	30
New Zealand Albums (RMNZ)	9
Norwegian Albums (VG-lista)	30
Portuguese Albums (AFP)	32
Scottish Albums (Official Charts)	3
Spanish Albums (PROMUSICAE)	3
Swedish Albums (Sverigetopplistan)	40
Swiss Albums (Schweizer Hitparade)	9
UK Albums (Official Charts)	4
US Billboard 200	23
US Top Rock Albums (Billboard)	4

=== Year-end charts ===
Chart (2017)	Position
Belgian Albums (Ultratop Flanders)	179
