= Keep Me Singing =

Studio album by Van Morrison
- Released: 30 September 2016
- Recorded: 2015–16
- Genre: Rock
- Length: 56:33
- Label: Caroline
- Producer: Van Morrison

Van Morrison chronology
The Essential Van Morrison (2015)	Keep Me Singing (2016)	Roll with the Punches (2017)

Keep Me Singing is the 36th studio album by Northern Irish singer-songwriter Van Morrison, released on 30 September 2016 by Caroline Records. It is Morrison's highest-charting album in the US, and third US Top 10 album, following the success of Keep It Simple (2008) and Born to Sing: No Plan B (2012).

== Critical reception ==
Professional ratings
Aggregate scores
Source	Rating
Metacritic	74/100
Review scores
Source	Rating
AllMusic	3.5/5 stars
Consequence of Sound	B−
Entertainment Weekly	B+
The Independent	3/5 stars
Rolling Stone	3/5 stars

Keep Me Singing received generally positive reviews from music critics, with Metacritic giving the album an average score of 74 / 100 based on ten reviews. Rolling Stone found that "through arrangements elegant to a fault, his mercurial tenor, more supple and restrained, remains a marvel", with his delivery at times being "full of chortles, snarls and gospel-tinged hollers." Hot Press wrote that Morrison's "voice is as strong and expressive as ever, while the songs are a mix of familiar-sounding, soulful ballads and mid-tempo jazz-influenced tunes." His "liquid-smooth voice" is "just as soulful as ever", wrote PopMatters, finding that Morrison "draws on a variety of vocal traditions from Celtic folk to contemporary jazz", and combines them "through the sheer force of his being." Consequence concluded that "[there] are very few constants in life, but another warm record from Van the Man seems par for the course", but noted that it was "pierced with a severe, self-reflective melancholy".

=== Accolades ===
Publication	Accolade	Year	Rank
Mojo	The 50 Best Albums of 2016	2016	47

== Commercial performance ==
Keep Me Singing debuted at number four on the UK Albums Chart, and at number nine on the US Billboard 200. It sold 25,000 units in the US in its first week, with almost all of that figure in traditional album sales. It is his last US Top 10 to date.

== Track listing ==
No.	Title	Length
1.	"Let It Rhyme"	3:53
2.	"Every Time I See a River"	4:43
3.	"Keep Me Singing"	3:39
4.	"Out in the Cold Again"	7:06
5.	"Memory Lane"	4:08
6.	"The Pen Is Mightier Than the Sword"	3:51
7.	"Holy Guardian Angel"	6:18
8.	"Share Your Love with Me"	4:11
9.	"In Tiburon"	5:18
10.	"Look Beyond the Hill"	2:28
11.	"Going Down to Bangor"	5:18
12.	"Too Late"	2:48
13.	"Caledonia Swing"	2:52

== Personnel ==
- Van Morrison - vocals, guitar (1–3, 6, 7, 11, 12), drums (4, 5), piano (13), alto saxophone (8, 10, 13), blues harp (1, 3, 11).
- Dave Keary - acoustic and electric guitar (1, 2, 6, 8–10).
- Johnny Scott - electric guitar (3, 11).
- Nigel Price - acoustic and electric guitar (4, 5, 12).
- John Platania - acoustic guitar (7, 13).
- Paul Moore - bass (1, 2, 7, 8, 10, 13).
- Nicky Scott - bass (3, 11).
- Jez Brown - bass (6, 9).
- Laurence Cottle - bass (4, 5, 12), trombone (8, 10, 12).
- Paul Moran - keyboards (1, 2, 4–10, 12, 13), trumpet (2, 8–10, 12).
- Fiachra Trench - keyboards (1–5, 8, 10–12), strings arrangements (1, 2, 4, 5, 7).
- Enda Walsh - keyboards (2, 3, 7), percussion (3).
- Robbie Ruggiero - drums (1, 6, 9).
- Liam Bradley - drums and percussion (2, 3, 7, 8, 10, 11).
- Paul Robinson - drums (4, 5, 12).
- Neal Wilkinson - drums (13).
- Kate St John - English horn (4, 5).
- Anthony Kerr - vibraphone (8, 10).
- Tony Fitzgibbon - fiddle (13).
- Ange Grant, Dana Masters, Lance Ellington - backing vocals.

== Charts ==
=== Weekly charts ===
Chart (2016)	Peak position
Australian Albums (ARIA)	11
Austrian Albums (Ö3 Austria)	4
Belgian Albums (Ultratop Flanders)	7
Belgian Albums (Ultratop Wallonia)	42
Canadian Albums (Billboard)	18
Dutch Albums (Album Top 100)	7
French Albums (SNEP)	141
German Albums (Offizielle Top 100)	6
Irish Albums (IRMA)	28
Italian Albums (FIMI)	14
New Zealand Albums (RMNZ)	5
Norwegian Albums (VG-lista)	20
Portuguese Albums (AFP)	39
Scottish Albums (OCC)	3
Spanish Albums (PROMUSICAE)	5
Swedish Albums (Sverigetopplistan)	19
Swiss Albums (Schweizer Hitparade)	12
UK Albums (OCC)	4
US Billboard 200	9
US Top Rock Albums (Billboard)	3

=== Year-end charts ===
Chart (2016)	Position
Belgian Albums (Ultratop Flanders)	162
Spanish Albums (PROMUSICAE)	84
US Top Rock Albums (Billboard)	68
