= Tore Down a la Rimbaud =

Single by Van Morrison

from the album A Sense of Wonder
- A-side: "Tore Down a la Rimbaud"
- B-side: "Haunts of Ancient Peace (live)"
- Released: 1985
- Recorded: 1983
- Genre: Celtic, rock & roll
- Length: 4:09
- Label: Mercury Records
- Songwriter(s): Van Morrison
- Producer(s): Van Morrison

Van Morrison singles chronology
"A Sense of Wonder" (1984)	"Tore Down a la Rimbaud" (1985)	"Ivory Tower" (1986)

"Tore Down a la Rimbaud" is a song written by Northern Irish singer-songwriter Van Morrison and included on his 1985 album, A Sense of Wonder.

== Composition ==
The title and theme of the song derives from French poet Arthur Rimbaud who became famous for his poetry at the age of fifteen in 1869 and who quit writing six years later. Morrison had begun writing the song in 1975 during the three-year professionally inactive time period after he released the album, Veedon Fleece.

Morrison has been quoted on the origins of the song:

[It was] during the period... between Veedon Fleece and A Period of Transition [that] I started "Tore Down a la Rimbaud" – after I read that [Rimbaud] stopped writing altogether when he was twenty-six, became an arms dealer or something. He never wrote a line after that. Ironically, that sorta got me writing again. Took a long time to finish, though – eight years before I got the rest of the lines. That's the longest I've ever carried a song around.

I'd been reading him [Rimbaud] when I got the original idea. The idea is ten or twelve years old, and I just rewrote it. I wasn't writing anything at all and I really didn't understand why. Sometimes I get over a block by just sitting down at a typewriter and typing what I've just done."

== Reception ==
Cash Box called it "a musically and lyrically rich cut."

== Other releases ==
A remastered version of "Tore Down a la Rimbaud" is included on Morrison's 2007 compilation album, Still on Top - The Greatest Hits and on The Essential Van Morrison. However, the song failed to appear on his first compilation (and best selling album) The Best of Van Morrison.

== Personnel ==
- Van Morrison – vocals, piano
- John Allair – organ
- Bob Doll – trumpet
- Tom Donlinger – drums
- Pee Wee Ellis – tenor saxophone
- David Hayes – bass
- Pauline Lazano – backing vocals
- Chris Michie – guitar
- Bianca Thornton – backing vocals
