= Versatile (Van Morrison album) =

Studio album by Van Morrison
- Released: 1 December 2017
- Recorded: 2013, 2017
- Length: 68:31
- Label: Legacy (US) Caroline (rest of the world)
- Producer: Van Morrison

Van Morrison chronology
Roll with the Punches (2017)	Versatile (2017)	You're Driving Me Crazy (2018)

Versatile is the 38th studio album by Van Morrison, released on 1 December 2017 by Caroline. His second release of the year, it entered the Top 40 in six countries, including the UK. The album consists of some originals, both new and older, mixed with jazz standards.

== Recording ==
The first track, "Broken Record", is an original composition whose opening riff traces back to "Heathrow Shuffle", an instrumental Morrison played from around 1974 in concerts, and is included on the Live at Montreux 1980/1974 DVD. Another original, "Affirmation", was based on a previously released "Sax Instrumental No. 1" from a 1999 CD single for "Back on Top".

== Critical reception ==
The Guardian describes the album as a "lively trip through the swing songbook", "a curious little joy of a record", and "very much a mood album, gently swinging".

== Track listing ==
1. "Broken Record" (Morrison)
2. "A Foggy Day" (George Gershwin, Ira Gershwin)
3. "Let's Get Lost" (Jimmy McHugh, Frank Loesser)
4. "Bye Bye Blackbird" (Ray Henderson, Mort Dixon)
5. "Skye Boat Song" (Traditional; arranged by Morrison)
6. "Take It Easy Baby" (Morrison)
7. "Makin' Whoopee" (Gus Kahn, Walter Donaldson)
8. "I Get a Kick Out of You" (Cole Porter)
9. "I Forgot That Love Existed" (Morrison)
10. "Unchained Melody" (Alex North, Hy Zaret)
11. "Start All Over Again" (2017 Version) (Morrison)
12. "Only a Dream" (2013 Version) (Morrison)
13. "Affirmation" (Morrison)
14. "The Party's Over" (Jule Styne, Betty Comden, Adolph Green)
15. "I Left My Heart in San Francisco" (George Cory, Douglass Cross)
16. "They Can't Take That Away from Me" (George Gershwin, Ira Gershwin)

== Musicians ==
- Van Morrison : Vocals, Alto Saxophone
- Jay Berliner : Acoustic Spanish Guitar
- Dave Keary : Electric Guitar
- Paul Moore : Bass guitar
- Paul Moran : Keyboards, trumpet, musical director
- Sir James Galway : Concert Flute
- Christopher White : Tenor Saxophone
- Alistair White : Trombone
- Jeff Lardner : Drums
- Mez Clough; Drums
- Robbie Ruggiero : Percussion
- Rod Quinn : Percussion

== Charts ==
Chart (2017)	Peak position
Australian Albums (ARIA)	31
Austrian Albums (Ö3 Austria)	26
Belgian Albums (Ultratop Flanders)	36
Dutch Albums (Album Top 100)	28
German Albums (Offizielle Top 100)	35
Irish Albums (IRMA)	28
Italian Albums (FIMI)	88
New Zealand Albums (RMNZ)	37
Scottish Albums (OCC)	30
Spanish Albums (PROMUSICAE)	10
Swedish Albums (Sverigetopplistan)	50
Swiss Albums (Schweizer Hitparade)	80
UK Albums (OCC)	38
US Billboard 200	119
