= Irish Music Hall of Fame =

Multimedia exhibition in Dublin, Ireland

Coordinates: 53.348°N 6.262°W

The Irish Music Hall of Fame was a multimedia exhibition in Dublin, Ireland, which operated between 1999 and 2001. Associated with the Hot Press music magazine, the commercially-operated museum contained memorabilia from a number of Irish musicians including Van Morrison, U2, Sinéad O'Connor, Rory Gallagher, Bob Geldof and The Cranberries.

First opened in 1999, the museum closed in late 2001 with losses estimated at approximately €1.5 million. Material from the museum later formed part of a touring exhibition until 2005, with some memorabilia also used in the "Irish Rock 'n' Roll Museum Experience" in Temple Bar which opened in 2015.

== See also ==
- List of music museums
