= Duets: Re-working the Catalogue =

Studio album by Van Morrison
- Released: 13 March 2015
- Venue: Manchester Evening News Arena; Slieve Donard Hotel, Newcastle
- Studio: British Grove (London, UK); AIR (London, UK)
- Genre: Jazz, blues, pop, rock, R&B
- Length: 76:13
- Label: RCA
- Producer: Van Morrison, Don Was, Bob Rock

Van Morrison chronology
Born to Sing: No Plan B (2012)	Duets: Re-working the Catalogue (2015)	The Essential Van Morrison (2015)

Duets: Re-working the Catalogue is the 35th studio album by Northern Irish singer/songwriter Van Morrison, released on 13 March 2015 on RCA Records, a subsidiary of Sony Music. Produced by Van Morrison along with Don Was and Bob Rock, it consists of previously recorded Morrison songs, reworked as duets. Collaborators include Bobby Womack, Steve Winwood, Mark Knopfler, Taj Mahal, Mavis Staples, Michael Bublé, Natalie Cole, George Benson, Gregory Porter, Clare Teal, P.J. Proby, Joss Stone, Georgie Fame, Mick Hucknall, Chris Farlowe, and Morrison's daughter Shana Morrison. Morrison's first album for Sony, it entered the Top 10 in six countries, including the UK.

== Reception ==
Professional ratings
Aggregate scores
Source	Rating
Metacritic	65/100
Review scores
Source	Rating
AllMusic	3.5/5 stars
Rolling Stone	3.5/4 stars

The album scored 65 / 100 on Metacritic, based on ten reviews, indicating a generally favourable response. Mark Deming of AllMusic thought it an "honestly good album" in which the artist "has chosen duet partners with intelligence". He judged that Van Morrison's "vocals lack the power and emotional force he so easily conjured in the '70s, but his sense of phrasing is as soulful and idiosyncratic as it has ever been". While it is "a long way from a triumph, it's a solid, heartfelt work from a veteran artist who isn't about to give up the ghost." In a rave review, Rolling Stone said that the singer "unearths lost classics with all-star friends", and "digs up deep cuts from mostly overlooked albums."

Duets debuted on Billboard 200 at No. 23, and at No. 2 on the Top Rock Albums chart, selling 21,000 copies in its first week. The album had sold 77,000 copies in the US as of August 2016.

In 2015, Morrison sold the rights to most of his catalogue to Legacy Recordings, the catalog division of Sony Music. Duets was his first album recorded following that deal.

== Track listing ==
No.	Title	Length
1.	"Some Peace of Mind" (with Bobby Womack)	5.15
2.	"If I Ever Needed Someone" (with Mavis Staples)	3.49
3.	"Higher than the World" (with George Benson)	3.48
4.	"Wild Honey" (with Joss Stone)	6.22
5.	"Whatever Happened to P.J. Proby" (with P. J. Proby)	3.42
6.	"Carrying a Torch" (with Clare Teal)	4.52
7.	"The Eternal Kansas City" (with Gregory Porter)	4.10
8.	"Streets of Arklow" (with Mick Hucknall)	4.57
9.	"These Are the Days" (with Natalie Cole)	3.51
10.	"Get On with the Show" (with Georgie Fame)	4.41
11.	"Rough God Goes Riding" (with Shana Morrison)	4.23
12.	"Fire in the Belly" (with Steve Winwood)	6.40
13.	"Born to Sing" (with Chris Farlowe)	3.59
14.	"Irish Heartbeat" (with Mark Knopfler)	5.14
15.	"Real Real Gone" (with Michael Bublé)	4.00
16.	"How Can a Poor Boy?" (with Taj Mahal)	6.34

== Personnel ==
- Van Morrison - acoustic guitar, alto saxophone, vocals
- Dave Keary - guitar, banjo
- Marcel Camargo, Ryan Lerman - guitar
- Paul Moore, Stanley Banks, Craig Polasko - bass
- David Garfield, Alan Chang - piano
- Paul Moran - Hammond organ, piano, flugelhorn, trumpet
- Jean Caze, Jumaane Smith, Justin Ray - trumpet
- Christopher White - tenor and baritone saxophone, tin whistle
- Jacob Rodriguez - baritone saxophone
- Jake Saslow, Rob Wilkerson - alto saxophone
- Alistair White - trombone, euphonium
- Mark Nightingale, Joshua Brown, Nick Vayenas - trombone
- Jeff Lardner, Robbie Ruggiero, Khari Parker, Marion Felder - drums
- Abass Nii Dodoo, Mike Osborn, Lilliana de Los Reyes - percussion

== Invited guests ==
- Bobby Womack : Vocals
- Mavis Staples : Vocals
- George Benson : Vocals
- Joss Stone : Vocals
- P.J. Proby : Vocals
- Clare Teal : Vocals
- Gregory Porter : Vocals
- Mick Hucknall : Vocals
- Natalie Cole : Vocals
- Georgie Fame : Vocals
- Shana Morrison : Vocals
- Steve Winwood : Vocals
- Chris Farlowe : Vocals
- Mark Knopfler : Vocals
- Michael Bublé : Vocals
- Taj Mahal : Vocals

== Charts ==
=== Weekly charts ===
Chart (2015)	Peak position
Australian Albums (ARIA)	10
Austrian Albums (Ö3 Austria)	12
Belgian Albums (Ultratop Flanders)	20
Belgian Albums (Ultratop Wallonia)	101
Canadian Albums (Billboard)	13
Danish Albums (Hitlisten)	8
Dutch Albums (Album Top 100)	3
German Albums (Offizielle Top 100)	11
Irish Albums (IRMA)	7
Italian Albums (FIMI)	19
New Zealand Albums (RMNZ)	2
Norwegian Albums (VG-lista)	8
Portuguese Albums (AFP)	15
Scottish Albums (OCC)	4
Spanish Albums (Promusicae)	4
Swedish Albums (Sverigetopplistan)	33
Swiss Albums (Schweizer Hitparade)	14
UK Albums (OCC)	5
US Billboard 200	23
US Digital Albums (Billboard)	17
US Top Rock Albums (Billboard)	2
US Indie Store Album Sales (Billboard)	6

=== Year-end charts ===
Chart (2015)	Position
Belgian Albums (Ultratop Flanders)	169

== Certifications ==
Certifications for Duets: Re-working the Catalogue
Region	Certification	Certified units/sales
United Kingdom (BPI)	Silver	60,000^{‡}
^{‡} Sales+streaming figures based on certification alone.
