= A Sense of Wonder =

Studio album by Van Morrison
- Released: December 1984
- Recorded: 1983
- Genre: Celtic soul
- Length: 43:08
- Label: Mercury (original release); Polydor (all reissues since 1990)
- Producer: Van Morrison

Van Morrison chronology
Live at the Grand Opera House Belfast (1984)	A Sense of Wonder (1984)	No Guru, No Method, No Teacher (1986)

Singles from A Sense of Wonder
- 1. "A Sense of Wonder" b/w "Haunts of Ancient Peace" Released: October 1984; 2. "Tore Down a la Rimbaud" b/w "Haunts of Ancient Peace" Released: 1985

A Sense of Wonder is the fifteenth studio album by Northern Irish singer-songwriter Van Morrison released in 1984. On first release, original pressings had to be recalled when the W. B. Yeats estate refused to allow Morrison's musical version of the poem "Crazy Jane on God" to be included, as they believed his poems should only be set to classical music. Morrison substituted "If You Only Knew" for the Yeats' recording. (Later, perhaps due to Morrison's efforts, Yeats poems would be put to rock settings on a whole album).

The 29 January 2008 reissued and remastered version of the album contains alternate takes of "Crazy Jane on God" and "A Sense of Wonder".

Professional ratings
Review scores
Source	Rating
AllMusic	3.5/5 stars
Robert Christgau	C+
Rolling Stone	(not rated)

== Track listing ==
All songs written by Van Morrison unless stated otherwise.

=== Side one ===
1. "Tore Down a la Rimbaud" – 4:09
2. "Ancient of Days" – 3:37
3. "Evening Meditation" – 4:13
4. "The Master's Eyes" – 4:01
5. "What Would I Do" (Ray Charles) – 5:10

=== Side two ===
1. "A Sense of Wonder" – 7:09
2. "Boffyflow and Spike" – 3:06
3. "If You Only Knew" (Mose Allison) – 2:56
4. "Let the Slave (Incorporating the Price of Experience)" (William Blake, Adrian Mitchell, Mike Westbrook) – 5:26
5. "A New Kind of Man" – 3:21

=== Bonus tracks (2008 CD reissue) ===
1. "Crazy Jane on God" – 3:50 (Alternate take) (William Mathieu, Morrison, William Butler Yeats)
2. "A Sense of Wonder" – 6:06 (Alternate take)

== Personnel ==
=== Musicians ===
- Van Morrison – guitar, piano, vocals
- John Allair – Hammond organ
- Bob Doll – trumpet
- Tom Donlinger – drums
- Pee Wee Ellis – tenor saxophone
- David Hayes – Bass guitar
- Pauline Lazano – backing vocals
- Chris Michie – guitar
- Bianca Thornton – backing vocals
- Moving Hearts – group, performer on "A Sense of Wonder" and "Boffyflow and Spike"

=== Production ===
- Producer and director: Van Morrison
- Mixing: Jim Stern and Mick Glossop
- Project coordination: John Walter
- Sleeve design and art direction: Andrew Plewett
- Cover art: Torchlight, London
- Photography: Paul Cox
- Horn arrangements: Pee Wee Ellis

== Charts ==
Chart (1985)	Peak position
Australia (Kent Music Report)	34
American Albums Chart	61
United Kingdom (Official Charts Company)	25
