= Born to Sing: No Plan B =

Studio album by Van Morrison
- Released: 2 October 2012
- Recorded: Belfast, Northern Ireland
- Genres: Jazz, blues, pop, rock, R&B
- Length: 59:54
- Label: Blue Note
- Producer: Van Morrison

Van Morrison chronology
Astral Weeks Live at the Hollywood Bowl (2009)	Born to Sing: No Plan B (2012)	Duets: Re-working the Catalogue (2015)

Born to Sing: No Plan B is the 34th studio album recorded by Northern Irish singer/songwriter Van Morrison, released by Blue Note Records on 2 October 2012. It is his first studio album of original songs since 2008's Keep It Simple, with its four-year gap being the longest between two studio albums to date from the artist. It was well received by critics with most reviewers giving it four out of five stars, including Allmusic and Rolling Stone. It debuted at No. 10 on the Billboard 200. It was Morrison's first album since the merger of EMI and Universal Music Group, which consolidated ownership of all his albums from 1984 onward.

== Recording ==
Recorded in his hometown of Belfast, the album was described as containing ten new original songs although "Close Enough for Jazz" had featured as an instrumental on his 1993 release Too Long in Exile. The album was recorded live at the studio and features a six piece band of musicians, with Morrison on vocals, piano, guitar and alto-saxophone.

== Composition ==
One of the album's themes and some of the songs reflect on the current worldwide financial crisis. Morrison has spoken out that he felt the need to comment on what he perceives as "the worldwide preoccupation with money, materialism, income equality, and the greed that has poisoned society" while further remarking: "I’m not proselytizing, it’s not some kind of manifesto. Songs are just ideas, concepts, and you just put the mic there and go."

== Single ==
Single "Open the Door (To Your Heart)" was released by EMI on 24 September 2012. It featured as the Record of the Week on BBC Radio 2 during the week commencing 25 August 2012.

The Daily Nebraskan described the song as beginning "the album with a jaunty rhythm of bass, oscillating tones of an organ and an electric guitar accentuating the off-beats. The tempo is much slower but for those fans more intimately familiar with Morrison’s catalog of songs, it feels oddly similar to "Wild Night", which appeared on his 1971 album "Tupelo Honey". Casting off the wildness of youth, this easy-paced speed more fully exposes the intricate dialog between the instruments; not only on this song but throughout the album."

== Pre-release ==
Blue Note's president Don Was, who oversaw the release, argued that the album features "great, really incisive songwriting. It's a cool record." Was commented that the label was "incredibly honored" to have been chosen by Morrison, referring to him as "one of the greatest singer/songwriter/musicians of all time". In an interview with John Bennett in the Belfast Telegraph, Morrison described his meaning of the title as: "Well it’s all about doing what you’re meant to do and no frills, like Mose Allison said about me, if you want to look it up, 'There's no smoke or mirrors, there’s no lights. It is what you get.' That’s basically what you get. I’m not a tap dancing act. It’s just singing."

== Critical reception ==
Professional ratings
Aggregate scores
Source	Rating
Metacritic	72/100
Review scores
Source	Rating
Allmusic	4/5 stars
Belfast Telegraph	4/5 stars
The Guardian	4/5 stars
The Independent	4/5 stars
The Irish Times	3/5 stars
Jazzwise	4/5 stars
musicOMH	4/5 stars
The Observer	4/5 stars
Rolling Stone	4/5 stars
Uncut	7/10 stars

David Fricke hailed the album as a "vividly irritated, vocally compelling record", with Morrison "surrounded by jive and crooks, with nothing to fall back on but his sinuous growl – like gravel rolling through velvet – and scatting hallelujahs." Allmusic found that, "Employing his trademark Celtic soul, the album also showcases incursions into jazz and blues and sometimes all three within the same tune." Jazzwise critic Stephen Graham noted that the album was "recorded unusually in his home town of Belfast", and judged that "Morrison has come up with the goods once again". A preview for the same publication found that "initial listens suggest it’s his strongest album for some time", with Morrison "emphatically moving back into jazz territory", delivering "a wonderfully laconic, live-in-the-studio atmosphere". The Belfast Telegraph called it "effortless, cool and classy", adding that "when Plan A is this good, there's no reason to look any further".

Writing in The Guardian, Dave Simpson considered the album to be Morrison's "jazziest: the warm brass and catchy, sweet melodies recall 1970's Moondance. But the music's velvet glove delivers some of his hardest-hitting lyrics." The Observer found that "Morrison's voice remains peerless. A keeper, a goodie." MusicOMH praised the band as being "particularly wonderful, with a muted trumpet and double bass making for memorable solos." It concluded that "it's yet another example of his sometimes erratic genius." The Independent's Andy Gill hailed it as "Van Morrison's best album in some while" with "a set of songs that, despite the relaxed tone of their jazz-blues settings, foam with indignation about the venality of capitalist adventurism." The New Zealand Herald welcomed "[another] worthwhile late-career high from Van".

"His voice remains in sturdy form, all rumble and husk, and his once sinuous cadence feels wizened, not weakened, by the occasional arthritic crick", The A.V. Club noted. Giving it album a C+ rating, it criticised its "cynical" tone and "exhausted R&B", but conceded that it was salvaged by "solid, serviceable, latter-day Morrison material." Uncut reviewer Graeme Thomson concluded that the album "remains a vibrant and timely reaffirmation of Morrison’s talents." While not transcendent, "it contains several hints that such greatness may, finally, be within his grasp once more." Tony Clayton wrote in The Irish Times that "lyrically he ruminates on financial crises and (once again) the pressures of being Van the Man, musically it’s all jazzy breezes (Going Down to Monte Carlo) and leisurely blues (Pagan Heart)." Brandon Stewart with 612 ABC Brisbane praised the warm sound as being "immediately familiar, as Van and his road band swing through the freshest set of songs we’ve heard from Morrison in some years." Colm O'Hare of Hot Press found the album to be "chock-full of that newfound energy, lyrically and musically" harking back "to his '70s heyday". "With superb accompaniment from a stellar band, the performances and arrangements on Born To Sing: Plan B are close to perfection", he concluded.

== Track listing ==
All tracks are written by Van Morrison.

No.	Title	Length
1.	"Open the Door (To Your Heart)"	5.19
2.	"Going Down to Monte Carlo"	8.12
3.	"Born to Sing"	4.39
4.	"End of the Rainbow"	4.35
5.	"Close Enough for Jazz"	3.45
6.	"Mystic of the East"	4.56
7.	"Retreat and View"	6.50
8.	"If in Money We Trust"	8.02
9.	"Pagan Heart"	7.52
10.	"Educating Archie"	5.41

== Personnel ==
Music

- Van Morrison – alto saxophone, electric guitar, piano, vocals
- Dave Keary – electric and acoustic guitar, slide guitar
- Paul Moore – bass, double bass
- Paul Moran – Hammond organ, piano, keyboards, trumpet
- Alistair White – trombone
- Christopher White – tenor saxophone, clarinet
- Jeff Lardner – drums, percussion

Production

- Van Morrison – production for Exile Productions, Ltd.
- Enda Walsh – recording, mixing
- Tim Young – mastered at Metropolis Mastering, London, UK
- John Rogers – management
- Paddy Johnston – personal assistant

== Chart performance ==
Year	Chart	Position
2012	Austria Albums Chart	10
2012	Belgium Albums Chart	18
2012	Denmark Albums Chart	12
2012	Dutch Albums Chart	20
2012	Germany Albums Chart	15
2012	Ireland Albums Chart	9
2012	Italy Albums Chart	39
2012	New Zealand Albums Chart	16
2012	Norway Albums Top 40 Chart	14
2012	Spanish Albums Chart	9
2012	Switzerland Albums Chart	33
2012	UK Albums Chart	15
2012	US Billboard 200	10
2012	World Albums Top 40	12
