= Pay the Devil =

Studio album by Van Morrison
- Released: 6 March 2006
- Genre: Country
- Length: 45:44
- Label: Lost Highway
- Producer: Van Morrison

Van Morrison chronology
Magic Time (2005)	Pay the Devil (2006)	Live at Austin City Limits Festival (2006)

Singles from Pay the Devil
- 1. "Playhouse"

Professional ratings
Aggregate scores
Source	Rating
Metacritic	75/100
Review scores
Source	Rating
Allmusic	4/5 stars
earvolution.com	(unrated)
Entertainment Weekly	B+
The Independent	(unrated)
livedaily.com	(unrated)
The Music Box	3.5/5 stars
No Depression	(unrated)
Rolling Stone	3/5 stars

Pay the Devil is the thirty-second studio album by Northern Irish singer-songwriter Van Morrison. It was released in 2006 by Lost Highway. The album features twelve cover versions of American country and western tunes and three original compositions. It debuted at No. 26 on The Billboard 200 and peaked at No. 7 on Top Country Albums; it was listed at No. 10 on Amazon Best of 2006 Editor's Picks in Country in December 2006.

A deluxe edition of Pay the Devil featuring a video of five of the tracks taped during the performance at the Ryman was released on 27 June 2006.

== Songs ==
The songs on the album consist of twelve cover songs and three originals. The cover songs are chosen from old-time country songs recorded during the 1950s and 1960s by well-known country artists such as Hank Williams, Webb Pierce, Merle Haggard and George Jones. Morrison's three originals are written and sung to blend with the classic country cover versions.

Erik Hage described Morrison's version of "Till I Gain Control Again" written by Rodney Crowell: "There's a sense of fragility and defeat, and it is moving in a way that a Van Morrison song rarely moves the listener. The singer sounds utterly broken down and shaken: 'hold me now, hold me now' he unsteadily repeats 'until I gain control again'. Even Morrison's most emotional material in the past never projected such pretty frailty."

== Promotion ==
Morrison previewed some of the Pay the Devil material at his live shows in the previous year. He promoted the new album with a seven city tour of the US in March 2006. On 7 March 2006, the day of its release in the United States, Van Morrison Day was declared in Nashville by the mayor, and Morrison appeared at the historic Ryman Auditorium that evening for the first time. He continued to promote the album throughout 2006 and appeared at the Austin City Limits Music Festival on 15 September 2006 where his performance was listed as one of the top ten of the festival by Rolling Stone.

== Track listing ==
1. "There Stands the Glass" (Alize Gresham, Russ Hull, Mary Jane Shurtz) – 2:16
2. "Half as Much" (Curley Williams) – 2:36
3. "Things Have Gone to Pieces" (Leon Payne) – 3:11
4. "Big Blue Diamonds" (Earl J. Carson) – 2:56
5. "Playhouse" (Morrison) – 4:14
6. "Your Cheatin' Heart" (Hank Williams) – 2:32
7. "Don't You Make Me High" (Daniel Barker, Ken Harris) – 2:47
8. "My Bucket's Got a Hole in It" (Clarence Williams) – 2:22
9. "Back Street Affair" (Billy Wallace) – 2:49
10. "Pay the Devil" (Morrison) – 3:03
11. "What Am I Living For?" (Art Harris, Fred Jay) – 3:57
12. "This Has Got to Stop" (Morrison) – 4:44
13. "Once a Day" (Bill Anderson) – 2:52
14. "More and More" (Merle Kilgore, Webb Pierce) – 2:46
15. "'Til I Gain Control Again" (Rodney Crowell) – 5:59

== DVD track listing (Deluxe Edition) ==
Filmed at the Ryman Auditorium on 7 March 2006

1. "Playhouse" (Morrison)
2. "'Till I Gain Control Again" (Rodney Crowell)
3. "Big Blue Diamonds" (Earl J. Carson)
4. "This Has Got to Stop" (Morrison)
5. "There Stands the Glass" (Alize Gresham, Russ Hull, Mary Jane Shurtz)

== Personnel ==
- Van Morrison – acoustic guitar, vocals
- Crawford Bell – vocals
- Trionagh Moore – vocals
- Olwin Bell – vocals
- Paul Godden – guitar, steel guitar
- Mick Green – guitar
- Karen Hamill – vocals
- Bobby Irwin – drums
- Ian Jennings – double bass
- Bob Loveday – violin
- Leon McCrum – vocals
- Paul Riley – acoustic bass
- Johnny Scott – guitar, vocals
- Nicky Scott – electric bass
- Fiachra Trench – vocals, string arrangements
- Geraint Watkins – piano
- Aine Whelan – vocals
- Gavyn Wright – string section leader

== Production ==
- Van Morrison – Producer
- Declan Gaffney – Mixing assistant
- Jerome King – Assistant engineer
- Alastair McMillan – Mixing
- Walter Samuel – Engineer, mixing

== Charts ==
=== Weekly charts ===
Chart (2006)	Peak position
US Billboard 200	26
US Top Country Albums (Billboard)	7

=== Year-end charts ===
Chart (2006)	Position
US Top Country Albums (Billboard)	58
