= What's Wrong with This Picture? (Van Morrison album) =

Studio album by Van Morrison
- Released: 21 October 2003
- Recorded: 2002
- Studios: The Wool Hall (Beckington, UK); Kilmurray House; Westland (Dublin, Ireland)
- Genres: Celtic rock, blues, R&B
- Length: 63:37
- Label: Blue Note
- Producer: Van Morrison

Van Morrison chronology
Down the Road (2002)	What's Wrong with This Picture? (2003)	Magic Time (2005)

Singles from What's Wrong with This Picture?
- 1. "Once in a Blue Moon" b/w "Walkin' My Baby Back Home"/"When You're Smiling" Released: December 2003

What's Wrong with This Picture? is the thirtieth studio album by Northern Irish singer-songwriter Van Morrison, released on 21 October 2003 by Blue Note Records.

The album received a Grammy Awards nomination for Morrison in the "Best Contemporary Blues Album" category. Two singles from the album were released and charted on the Billboard Adult Alternative Airplay: "Once in a Blue Moon" (#16) and "Evening in June" (#20).

== Reception ==
The album was acclaimed by critics. Writing in AllMusic, Thom Jurek declared it to be one of Morrison's finest: "This is the sound of an artist who is comfortable making a break with his past because it is not a break; he understands it as the next part of a continuum that goes deeper and wider than anyone else ever expected. This is the sound of self-assurance as it articulates itself with grace and aplomb."

Professional ratings
Review scores
Source	Rating
AllMusic	link
Capital Celtic	link
Entertainment Weekly	(unrated) link
Michigan Daily	link
PopMatters	(unrated) link
RTÉ.ie	link
Rolling Stone	link
Uncut	link

== Track listing ==
All songs by Van Morrison, unless noted otherwise.

1. "What's Wrong with This Picture?" – 6:00
2. "Whinin Boy Moan" – 4:17
3. "Evening in June" – 4:00
4. "Too Many Myths" – 4:32
5. "Somerset" (Acker Bilk, David Collett, Morrison) – 4:09
6. "Meaning of Loneliness" – 6:41
7. "Stop Drinking" (Lightnin' Hopkins, Morrison) – 3:24
8. "Goldfish Bowl" – 6:01
9. "Once in a Blue Moon" – 3:30
10. "Saint James Infirmary" (Traditional) – 5:32
11. "Little Village" – 4:30
12. "Fame" – 5:21
13. "Get on with the Show" – 5:40

== Personnel ==
- Van Morrison – vocals, acoustic guitar, alto saxophone
- Ned Edwards – acoustic and electric guitars, backing vocals
- Johnny Scott – electric guitar, mandolin
- Foggy Lyttle – electric guitar, backing vocals
- Mick Green – electric guitar
- Nicky Scott – bass guitar
- Lee Goodall – alto and baritone saxophones, flute, backing vocals
- Martin Winning – clarinet, tenor saxophone
- Acker Bilk – clarinet
- Keith Donald – bass clarinet
- Matt Holland – trumpet, flugelhorn, backing vocals
- Gavin Povey – piano
- Richard Dunn – Hammond organ
- David Hayes – bass guitar, backing vocals
- Liam Bradley – drums, backing vocals
- Bobby Irwin – drums
- Alan Wicket – congas, washboard

== Charts ==
Album – UK Album Chart

Year	Chart	Position
2003	UK Album Chart	43

Album – Billboard (North America)

Year	Chart	Position
2003	The Billboard 200	32
