= Van Morrison discography =

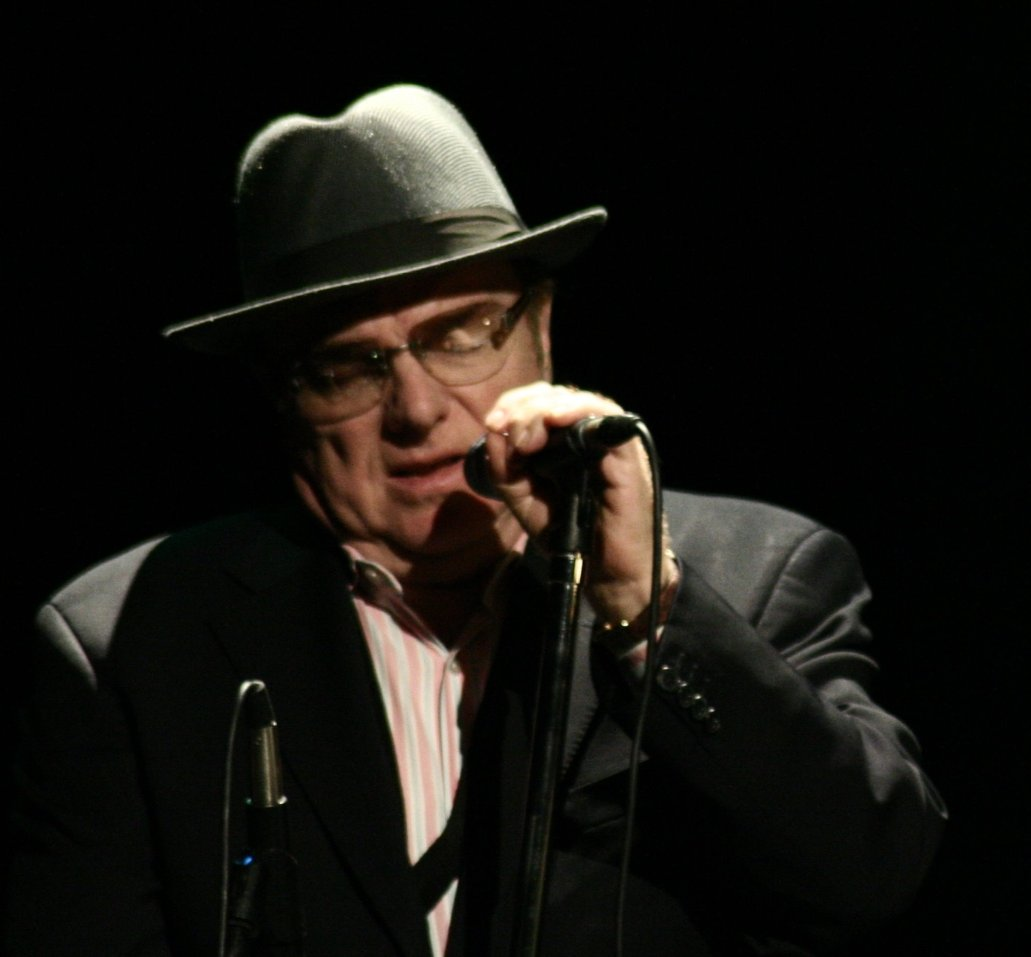
- Morrison performing in 2007
- Studio albums: 45
- Live albums: 7
- Compilation albums: 9
- Singles: 82
- Video albums: 6
- Remix albums: 1

This is the discography of Northern Irish singer Van Morrison.

Morrison made his first recording playing saxophone on "Boozoo Hully Gully" with the International Monarchs in 1962. His first recording session as lead singer/songwriter with Them was produced by Dick Rowe at Decca's studio. "Don't Start Crying Now" was the first single released and the garage rock classic, "Gloria" was also recorded at this session. "Baby, Please Don't Go" (recorded October 1964) was released November 1964 with "Gloria" as the B-side and was a top ten hit in the UK Singles Chart. "Here Comes the Night" was Them's second hit in 1965, charting at No. 2 in the UK and No. 24 in the US.

Morrison had his first recording session as a solo artist for Bang Records in New York City for Bert Berns on 28 March 1967. One of the songs was "Brown Eyed Girl", which charted at No. 10 on the Billboard Hot 100. By April 2008, he had been on the Billboard album chart a total of 787 weeks.

== Studio albums ==
=== 1960s ===
Title	Album details	Peak chart positions					Certifications
Title	Album details	UK	IRE	ITA	NED	US	Certifications
Blowin' Your Mind!	Released: September 1967; Label: Bang (#B218); Formats: LP, CS	—	—	—	—	182	
Astral Weeks	Released: 29 November 1968; Label: Warner (#WS1768); Formats: LP, CS	55 (Note: Astral Weeks peaked at #55 in The UK in 2015.)	26 (Note: Astral Weeks peaked at #26 in Ireland in 2000.)	67 (Note: Astral Weeks peaked at #67 in Italy in 2015.)	59 (Note: Astral Weeks peaked at #59 in The Netherlands in 2015.)	— (Note: Astral Weeks has sold over 500k copies in The US without entering the Billboard 200 albums chart.)	BPI: Platinum; RIAA: Gold
"—" denotes items that did not chart or were not released in that territory.

=== 1970s ===
Title	Album details	Peak chart positions								Certifications
Title	Album details	UK	AUS	CAN	GER	NED	NOR	NZ	US	Certifications
Moondance	Released: 27 January 1970; Label: Warner (#WS1835); Formats: LP, CS	32	20	46	56 (Note: Moondance peaked at #56 in Germany in 2013.)	9	19	36 (Note: Moondance peaked at #36 in New Zealand in 2013.)	29	BPI: Platinum; RIAA: 3× Platinum
His Band and the Street Choir	Released: 15 November 1970; Label: Warner (#WS1884); Formats: LP, CS	18	32	39	—	—	—	—N/a	32	
Tupelo Honey	Released: 15 October 1971; Label: Warner (#WS1950); Formats: LP, CS, 8-track	—	33	32	—	—	—	—N/a	27	RIAA: Gold
Saint Dominic's Preview	Released: July 1972; Label: Warner (#BS2633); Formats: LP, CS, 8-track	—	15	14	—	10	—	—N/a	15	
Hard Nose the Highway	Released: August 1973; Label: Warner (#BS2712); Formats: LP, CS, 8-track	22	42	18	—	—	—	—N/a	27	
Veedon Fleece	Released: 5 October 1974; Label: Warner (#BS2805); Formats: LP, CS, 8-track	41	59	80	—	—	—	—N/a	53	BPI: Silver
A Period of Transition	Released: April 1977; Label: Warner (#BS2987); Formats: LP, CS, 8-track	23	31	—	—	—	—	—	43	
Wavelength	Released: September 1978; Label: Warner (#BSK3212); Formats: LP, CS, 8-track	27	16	31	—	50	—	9	28	BPI: Silver
Into the Music	Released: August 1979; Label: Mercury (#9102 852); Formats: LP, CS, 8-track	21	10	20	—	33	16	13	43	BPI: Silver
"—" denotes items that did not chart or were not released in that territory. "N/A" indicates chart not yet published.

=== 1980s ===
Title	Album details	Peak chart positions											Certifications
Title	Album details	UK	AUS	CAN	GER	IRE	NED	NOR	NZ	SWE	SWI	US	Certifications
Common One	Released: August 1980; Label: Mercury (#6302021); Formats: LP, CS	53	40	—	—	—	—	22	23	—	—	73	
Beautiful Vision	Released: 16 February 1982; Label: Mercury (#6302122); Formats: LP, CS, CD	31	20	22	—	—	25	9	13	36	—	44	ARIA: Gold
Inarticulate Speech of the Heart	Released: March 1983; Label: Mercury (#MERL16); Formats: LP, CS, CD	24	21	69	—	—	14	17	4	—	—	116	RMNZ: Platinum
A Sense of Wonder	Released: December 1984; Label: Mercury (#MERH54); Formats: LP, CS, CD	25	34	27	53	—	30	—	19	43	30	61	
No Guru, No Method, No Teacher	Released: July 1986; Label: Mercury (#MERH94); Formats: LP, CS, CD	27	32	57	46	—	30	—	20	9	—	70	
Poetic Champions Compose	Released: September 1987; Label: Mercury (#MERH110); Formats: LP, CS, CD	26	25	23	53	—	13	—	21	19	—	90	CAN: Gold
Irish Heartbeat (with The Chieftains)	Released: June 1988; Label: Mercury (#MERH124); Formats: LP, CS, CD	18	29	29	62	—	35	15	23	26	27	102	
Avalon Sunset	Released: 19 May 1989; Label: Polydor (#8392621); Formats: LP, CS, CD	13	30	28	35	1	8	11	18	10	—	91	BPI: Gold; CAN: Gold; NVPI: Gold; RIAA: Gold
"—" denotes items that did not chart or were not released in that territory.

=== 1990s ===
Title	Album details	Peak chart positions											Certifications
Title	Album details	UK	AUS	CAN	GER	IRE	NED	NOR	NZ	SWE	SWI	US	Certifications
Enlightenment	Released: October 1990; Label: Polydor (#8471001); Formats: LP, CS, CD	5	39	19	43	1	33	—	14	7	—	62	BPI: Gold; MC: Gold
Cuchulainn	Released: 1991; Label: Moles Records; Formats: CS	—	—	—	—	—	—	—	—	—	—	—	
Hymns to the Silence	Released: September 1991; Label: Polydor (#8490261); Formats: LP, CS, CD	5	31	28	27	3	34	12	12	10	34	99	BPI: Silver; MC: Platinum; RIAA: Gold
Too Long in Exile	Released: 8 June 1993; Label: Exile (#5192192); Formats: LP, CS, CD	4	4	6	47	5	21	2	3	9	17	29	BPI: Silver; AUS: Gold; MC: Gold; RMNZ: Platinum; NOR: Gold
Days Like This	Released: 5 June 1995; Label: Exile (#5273072); Formats: LP, CS, CD	5	16	15	49	1	33	7	8	8	39	33	BPI: Gold; IRE: Platinum; RMNZ: Gold; RIAA: Gold
How Long Has This Been Going On (with Georgie Fame & friends)	Released: December 1995; Label: Verve (#5291362); Formats: LP, CS, CD	76	100	58	83	—	81	—	—	47	—	55	
Tell Me Something: The Songs of Mose Allison (Georgie Fame, Mose Allison and Ben Sidran)	Released: 8 October 1996; Label: Verve (#5332032); Formats: LP, CS, CD	—	—	—	—	—	—	—	—	—	—	— (Note: Tell Me Something: The Songs of Mose Allison reached #1 on the US Top Jazz Albums.)	
The Healing Game	Released: 3 March 1997; Label: Exile (#5371012); Formats: LP, CS, CD	10	17	59	12	5	29	8	6	13	43	32	BPI: Silver; RMNZ: Gold
Back on Top	Released: 9 March 1999; Label: Virgin/Pointblank (#VPBCD50); Formats: LP, CS, CD	11	13	21	20	7	21	1	5	5	42	28	BPI: Gold; MC: Gold; RMNZ: Platinum; NOR: Gold; RIAA: Gold
"—" denotes items that did not chart or were not released in that territory.

=== 2000s ===
Title	Album details	Peak chart positions											Certifications
Title	Album details	UK	AUS	CAN	GER	IRE	NED	NOR	NZ	SWE	SWI	US	Certifications
You Win Again (with Linda Gail Lewis)	Released: 3 October 2000; Label: Virgin/Pointblank (#VPBCD54); Formats: LP, CS, CD, MD	34	—	—	47	23	94	32	36	21	—	161	
Down the Road	Released: 14 May 2002; Label: Exile (#5891772); Formats: LP, CS, CD	6	7	—	10	6	13	5	8	10	36	25	BPI: Silver; AUS: Gold
What's Wrong with This Picture?	Released: 21 October 2003; Label: Blue Note (#5901672); Formats: CS, CD	43	37	—	13	19	13	10	17	18	65	32	
Magic Time	Released: 17 May 2005; Label: Exile (#9870945); Formats: LP, CS, CD	3	15	—	12	14	10	6	21	6	45	25	BPI: Gold
Pay the Devil	Released: 6 March 2006; Label: Exile (#9876290); Formats: LP, CD, Download	8	54	—	21	22	31	10	—	16	55	26	BPI: Silver
Keep It Simple	Released: 17 March 2008; Label: Exile (#1762683); Formats: LP, CD	10	43	10	12	12	12	7	15	11	55	10	
"—" denotes items that did not chart or were not released in that territory.

=== 2010s ===
Title	Album details	Peak chart positions											Certifications
Title	Album details	UK	AUS	CAN	GER	IRE	NED	NOR	NZ	SWE	SWI	US	Certifications
Born to Sing: No Plan B	Released: 2 October 2012; Label: Blue Note (#6234912); Formats: CD	15	—	15	15	9	20	14	12	7	33	10	
Duets: Re-working the Catalogue	Released: 13 March 2015; Label: RCA (#88875068442); Formats: LP, CD, download	5	10	13	11	7	3	8	2	33	14	23	BPI: Silver
Keep Me Singing	Released: 30 September 2016; Label: Caroline/Exile (#5703574); Formats: LP, CD, download	4	11	18	6	14	7	20	5	19	12	9	
Roll with the Punches	Released: 22 September 2017; Label: Exile (#5771851); Formats: LP, CD, download	4	11	26	5	7	13	30	9	40	9	23	
Versatile	Released: 1 December 2017; Label: Exile (#6705335); Formats: LP, CD, download	38	31	—	35	28	28	—	37	50	80	119	
You're Driving Me Crazy (with Joey DeFrancesco)	Released: 27 April 2018; Label: Legacy (#19075820032); Formats: LP, CD, download	20	—	100	10	39	29	—	—	—	41	76	
The Prophet Speaks	Released: 7 December 2018; Label: Exile (#7707186); Formats: LP, CD, download	40	49	98	22	50	29	—	34	—	34	110	
Three Chords & the Truth	Released: 25 October 2019; Label: Exile (#801663); Formats: LP, CD, download	13	11	—	11	15	18	—	20	34	15	57	
"—" denotes items that did not chart or were not released in that territory.

=== 2020s ===
Title	Album details	Peak chart positions							
Title	Album details	UK	AUS	GER	IRE	NED	SWE	SWI	US
Latest Record Project, Volume 1	Released: 7 May 2021; Label: BMG (#4050538667905); Formats: LP, CD, download	5	41	3	48	4	29	6	182
What's It Gonna Take?	Released: 20 May 2022; Label: Exile, Virgin; Formats: LP, CD, download	62	94	8	—	14	—	7	—
Moving On Skiffle	Released: 10 March 2023; Label: Virgin; Formats: LP, CD, download	16	—	11	32	19	—	18	—
Accentuate the Positive	Released: 3 November 2023; Label: Virgin; Formats: LP, CD, download	39	—	21	—	42	—	22	—
New Arrangements and Duets	Released: 27 September 2024; Label: Virgin; Formats: LP, CD, download	—	—	26	—	—	—	—	—
Remembering Now	Released: 13 June 2025; Label: Virgin; Formats: LP, CD, download	11	—	6	81	11	49	8	—
Somebody Tried to Sell Me a Bridge	Released: 23 January 2026; Label: Orangefield/Exile; Formats: 2xLP, CD, download	—	—	—	—	—	—	57	—
"—" denotes items that did not chart or were not released in that territory.

== Live albums ==
Title	Album details	Peak chart positions											Certifications
Title	Album details	UK	AUS	CAN	GER	IRE	NED	NOR	NZ	SWE	SWI	US	Certifications
It's Too Late to Stop Now	Released: 1 February 1974; Label: Warner (#2BS2760); Formats: LP, 8-Track	167 (Note: It's Too Late to Stop Now peaked at #167 in The UK in 2008.)	23	41	28 (Note: It's Too Late to Stop Now peaked at #28 in Germany in 2016.)	79 (Note: It's Too Late to Stop Now peaked at #79 in Ireland in 2016.)	35 (Note: It's Too Late to Stop Now peaked at #35 in Ireland in 2016.)	—	—N/a	—	—	53	UK: Silver
Live at the Grand Opera House Belfast	Released: February 1984; Label: Mercury (#MERL36); Formats: LP, CS, CD	47	70	—	56	—	50	—	24	—	—	—	
A Night in San Francisco	Released: 17 May 1994; Label: Polydor (#5212902); Formats: CS, CD	8	12	31	73	—	39	—	9	23	—	125	
The Skiffle Sessions – Live in Belfast (with Lonnie Donegan and Chris Barber)	Released: 18 January 2000; Label: Venture (#CDVE945); Formats: LP, CS, CD, Download	14	—	—	80	13	99	33	14	51	—	—	
Live at Austin City Limits Festival	Released: November 2006; Label: Exile (#EXILECD1); Formats: 2xCD	—	—	—	—	—	—	—	—	—	—	—	
Astral Weeks Live at the Hollywood Bowl	Released: 9 February 2009; Label: EMI (#6934232); Formats: LP, CD, download	61	67	—	45	36	31	36	15	17	—	33	
..It's Too Late To Stop Now: Volumes II, III, IV & DVD	Released: 10 June 2016; Label: Legacy (#88875134742); Formats: CD, download, DVD	47	—	—	—	—	—	—	—	19	59	118	
Live at Orangefield: Be Just and Fear Not	Released: 12 July 2024; Label: Orangefield/Exile; Formats: 2xLP, CD, download	—	—	—	—	—	—	—	—	—	—	—	
"—" denotes items that did not chart or were not released in that territory. "N/A" indicates chart not yet published.

== Singles ==
=== 1960s ===
Year	Title	B-side	Peak chart positions				Certifications	Album
Year	Title	B-side	UK	CAN	NED	US	Certifications	Album
1967	"Brown Eyed Girl"	"Goodbye Baby"	60 (Note: "Brown Eyed Girl" did not chart in the UK until 2007 eventually reaching its peak position in 2013.)	13	12	10	BPI: 4× Platinum; RIAA: Platinum; RMNZ: 9× Platinum	Blowin' Your Mind
1967	"Ro Ro Rosey"	"Chick-A-Boom"	—	—	—	—		Blowin' Your Mind
1967	"Spanish Rose"	"Midnight Special"	—	—	18	—		Blowin' Your Mind
"—" denotes items that did not chart or were not released in that territory.

=== 1970s ===
Year	Title	B-side	Peak chart positions				Certifications	Album
Year	Title	B-side	UK	CAN	NED	US	Certifications	Album
1970	"Come Running"	"Crazy Love"	—	21	—	39	RMNZ: Platinum (for "Crazy Love")	Moondance
1970	"Domino"	"Sweet Jannie"	—	8	22	9		His Band and the Street Choir
1971	"Blue Money"	"Call Me Up in Dreamland"	—	13	—	23		His Band and the Street Choir
1971	"Call Me Up in Dreamland"	"When That Evening Sun Goes Down"	—	—	—	95		His Band and the Street Choir
1971	"Wild Night"	"Street Choir"	—	20	24	28		Tupelo Honey
1971	"Tupelo Honey"	"Starting a New Life"	—	35	—	47		Tupelo Honey
1972	"(Straight to Your Heart); Like a Cannonball"	"Old Old Woodstock"	—	—	—	— (Note: "(Straight to Your Heart) Like a Cannonball" peaked at number 19 on the Bubbling Under Hot 100 chart.)		Tupelo Honey
1972	"Jackie Wilson Said (I'm in Heaven When You Smile)"	"You've Got the Power"	—	65	—	61		Saint Dominic's Preview
1972	"Redwood Tree"	"Saint Dominic's Preview"	—	—	—	98		Saint Dominic's Preview
1973	"Gypsy"	"Saint Dominic's Preview"	—	76	—	— (Note: "Gypsy" peaked at number one on the Bubbling Under Hot 100 chart.)		Saint Dominic's Preview
1973	"Warm Love"	"I Will Be There"	—	66	—	—		Hard Nose the Highway
1973	"Bein' Green"	"Wild Children"	—	—	—	—		Hard Nose the Highway
1974	"Ain't Nothing You Can Do"	"Wild Children"	—	—	—	—		It's Too Late to Stop Now
1974	"Bulbs"	"Who Was That Masked Man"	—	—	—	—		Veedon Fleece
1974	"Caldonia" (with The Caledonia Soul Express)	"What's Up Crazy Pup?"	—	—	—	—		Non-album single
1974	"Gloria" (live)	"Warm Love"	—	—	—	—	RMNZ: Gold	It's Too Late to Stop Now
1977	"The Eternal Kansas City"	"Joyous Sound"	—	—	—	—		A Period of Transition
1977	"Joyous Sound"	"Mechanical Bliss"	—	—	—	—		A Period of Transition
1977	"Moondance"	"Cold Wind in August"	—	—	—	92	BPI: Gold; RMNZ: Platinum	Moondance
1978	"Wavelength"	"Checkin' It Out"	—	63	—	42		Wavelength
1979	"Natalia"	"Lifetimes"	—	—	—	—		Wavelength
1979	"Kingdom Hall"	"Checkin' it Out"	—	—	—	—		Wavelength
1979	"Bright Side of the Road"	"Rolling Hills"	63	—	48	— (Note: "Bright Side of the Road" peaked at number 10 on the Bubbling Under Hot 100 chart.)	BPI: Silver; RMNZ: Platinum	Into the Music
1979	"Full Force Gale"	"Bright Side of the Road"	—	—	—	—		Into the Music
"—" denotes items that did not chart or were not released in that territory.

=== 1980s ===
Year	Title	B-side	Peak chart positions										Certifications	Album
Year	Title	B-side	UK	AUS	BEL	CAN	IRE	NED	NZ	US Under	US Adult	US Rock	Certifications	Album
1980	"You Make Me Feel So Free"	"Full Force Gale"	—	—	—	—	—	—	—	—	—	—		Into the Music
1982	"Cleaning Windows"	"It's All in the Game"	—	—	—	—	—	—	—	—	—	—		Beautiful Vision
1982	"Scandinavia"	"Dweller on the Threshold"	—	—	—	—	—	—	—	—	—	—		Beautiful Vision
1983	"Cry For Home"	"Summertime in England"	98	—	—	—	—	—	40	—	—	—		Inarticulate Speech of the Heart
1983	"Celtic Swing"	"Mr. Thomas"	—	—	—	—	—	—	—	—	—	—		Inarticulate Speech of the Heart
1984	"Dweller on the Threshold"	"Northern Muse (Solid Ground)"	—	—	—	—	—	—	—	—	—	—		Live at the Grand Opera House Belfast
1984	"A Sense of Wonder"	"Haunts of Ancient Peace"	—	—	—	—	—	—	—	—	—	—		A Sense of Wonder
1985	"Tore Down a la Rimbaud"	"Haunts of Ancient Peace"	—	—	—	—	—	—	—	1	—	19		A Sense of Wonder
1986	"Ivory Tower"	"A New Kind of Man"	—	—	—	—	—	—	—	—	—	21		No Guru, No Method, No Teacher
1986	"Got to Go Back"	"In the Garden"	—	—	—	—	—	—	—	—	—	—		No Guru, No Method, No Teacher
1987	"Did Ye Get Healed?"	"Allow Me"	—	—	—	—	—	—	—	—	—	—		Poetic Champions Compose
1987	"Someone like You"	"Celtic Excavation"	—	—	—	—	—	—	—	—	28	—	RMNZ: Gold	Poetic Champions Compose
1988	"Queen of the Slipstream"	"Spanish Steps"	—	—	—	—	—	—	—	—	—	—		Poetic Champions Compose
1988	"I'll Tell Me Ma" (with The Chieftains)	"Tà Mo Chleamhnas Déanta"	—	—	—	—	—	—	—	—	—	—		Irish Heartbeat
1989	"Have I Told You Lately"	"Contacting My Angel"	74	93	14	—	12	14	—	—	12	—	BPI: Silver; RMNZ: Platinum	Avalon Sunset
1989	"Whenever God Shines His Light" (with Cliff Richard)	"I'd Love to Write Another Song"	20	—	—	89	3	—	—	—	—	—		Avalon Sunset
1989	"Orangefield"	"These Are the Days"	—	—	—	—	—	70	—	—	—	—		Avalon Sunset
"—" denotes items that did not chart or were not released in that territory.

=== 1990s ===
Year	Title	B-side	Peak chart positions										Certifications	Album
Year	Title	B-side	UK	AUS	CAN	IRE	NED	NZ	SCO	US AAA	US Adult	US Rock	Certifications	Album
1990	"Coney Island"	"Have I Told You Lately"	76	—	—	30	—	—	—N/a	—N/a	—	—		Avalon Sunset
1990	"Gloria"	"Rave on, John Donne"	—	—	—	—	—	—	—N/a	—N/a	—	—		The Best of Van Morrison
1990	"Real Real Gone"	"Start All Over Again"	79	117	28	—	—	—	—N/a	—N/a	34	18		Enlightenment
1990	"In the Days Before Rock 'n' Roll"	"I'd Love to Write Another Song"	94	—	—	—	—	—	—N/a	—N/a	—	—		Enlightenment
1991	"Enlightenment"	"Avalon of the Heart"	—	—	—	—	—	—	—N/a	—N/a	—	—		Enlightenment
1991	"I Can't Stop Loving You" (with The Chieftains)	"All Saints Day"	76	—	—	—	—	—	—N/a	—N/a	—	—		Hymns to the Silence
1991	"Why Must I Always Explain?"	"So Complicated"	101	—	69	—	—	—	—N/a	—N/a	—	43		Hymns to the Silence
1993	"Gloria" (with John Lee Hooker)	"Have I Told You Lately"	31	22	36	17	37	46	—	—N/a	36	—		Too Long in Exile
1995	"Have I Told You Lately" (with The Chieftains)	"Love is a Teasin'"	71	—	—	—	—	—	53	—N/a	—	—		The Long Black Veil
1995	"Days Like This"	"That Old Black Magic"	65	—	23	—	—	—	53	—N/a	—	—	RMNZ: 2× Platinum	Days Like This
1995	"Perfect Fit"	"Raincheck"/"Cleaning Windows"	—	—	—	—	—	—	—	—N/a	—	—		Days Like This
1995	"No Religion"	"Whenever God Shines His Light"/ "Have I Told You Lately"/"Gloria"	54	—	—	—	—	—	51	—	—			Days Like This
1996	"That's Life" (with Georgie Fame)	"Moondance"	92	—	—	—	—	—	—	—	—	—		How Long Has This Been Going On
1997	"The Healing Game"	"Full Force Gale '96"/"Look; What the Good People Done"	46	—	—	—	—	—	35	15	—	—		The Healing Game
1997	"Rough God Goes Riding"	"At the End of the Day"	168	—	—	—	—	—	—	—	—	—		The Healing Game
1999	"Precious Time"	"Jackie Wilson Said (I'm in Heaven When You Smile)"/ "Call Me Up in Dreamland"	36	—	49	—	96	—	34	2	—	—		Back on Top
1999	"Back on Top"	"John Brown's Body"/"I'm Ready"	69	—	—	—	—	—	69	4	—	—		Back on Top
1999	"Philosopher's Stone"	"These Dreams of You"/"Raincheck"	171	—	—	—	—	—	—	—	—	—		Back on Top
"—" denotes items that did not chart or were not released in that territory. Gray background indicates chart not yet published.

=== 2000–present ===
Year	Title	B-side	Peak chart positions					Certifications	Album
Year	Title	B-side	UK	IRE	NED	SCO	US AAA	Certifications	Album
2000	"I Wanna Go Home" (with Lonnie Donegan and Chris Barber)	"New Burying Ground"/ "Midnight Special"	95	—	—	—	—		The Skiffle Sessions - Live in Belfast 1998
2000	"Let's Talk About Us" (with Linda Gail Lewis)	"Singing the Blues"/ "The Ballad of Jesse James"	85	—	—	99	—		You Win Again
2002	"Hey Mr. DJ"	"Someone like You"/ "Bright Side of the Road"	58	41	91	54	19		Down the Road
2002	"Meet Me in the Indian Summer"	"In the Afternoon/Raincheck" (Live)/ "In The Midnight" (Live)	116	—	—	—	—		Down the Road
2003	"Once in a Blue Moon"	"Walkin' My Baby Back Home"	—	—	—	—	16		What's Wrong with This Picture?
2004	"Crazy Love" (with Ray Charles)	No B-side	—	—	—	—	12		Non-album single
2004	"Evening in June"	No B-side	—	—	—	—	20		What's Wrong with This Picture?
2005	"Celtic New Year"	No B-side	—	—	—	—	—		Magic Time
2006	"Playhouse"	No B-side	—	—	—	—	—		Pay the Devil
2006	"And It Stoned Me" (Live)	No B-side	—	—	—	—	—	RMNZ: Platinum	Live at Montreux 1980/1974
2006	"Cry for Home" (with Tom Jones)	No B-side	—	—	—	—	—		The Best of Van Morrison Volume 3
2007	"Blue and Green"	No B-side	—	—	—	—	—		The Best of Van Morrison Volume 3
2008	"Soul" (Live)	"Soul"	—	—	—	—	—		Keep It Simple
2008	"That's Entrainment"	No B-side	—	—	—	—	12		Keep It Simple
2012	"Open the Door (To Your Heart)"	No B-side	—	—	—	—	25		Born to Sing: No Plan B
2016	"Every Time I See a River"	"Every Time I See a River" (album)	—	—	—	—	—		Keep Me Singing
2018	"Close Enough for Jazz" (with Joey DeFrancesco)	"The Things I Used to Do" (with Joey DeFrancesco)	—	—	—	—	—		You're Driving Me Crazy
2018	"Ain't Gonna Moan No More"	No B-side	—	—	—	—	—		The Prophet Speaks
2025	"Down to Joy"	No B-side	—	—	—	—	—		Remembering Now
2025	"Cutting Corners"	No B-side	—	—	—	—	—		Remembering Now
"—" denotes items that did not chart or were not released in that territory.

== Other certified songs ==
Year	Song	Certification	Album
1968	"Sweet Thing"	RMNZ: Gold	Astral Weeks
1970	"Into the Mystic"	RMNZ: 3× Platinum	Moondance

== Other appearances ==
Year	Song	Album	Notes
1983	"Wonderful Remark"	The King of Comedy	original song
2001	"Sittin' on Top of the World"	Good Rockin' Tonight: The Legacy of Sun Records	with Carl Perkins
2005	"Blue and Green"	Hurricane Relief: Come Together Now	original song

== Compilations ==
Selected charted discography

Year	Title	Peak chart positions											Certifications
Year	Title	UK	AUS	CAN	GER	IRE	NED	NOR	NZ	SWE	SWI	US	Certifications
1990	The Best of Van Morrison	4	1	18	—	1	13	6	3	9	—	41	BPI: 2× Platinum; AUS: 5× Platinum; CAN: 2× Platinum; NZ: 5× Platinum; NOR: Platinum; RIAA: 4× Platinum
1993	The Best of Van Morrison Volume Two	31	28	45	—	—	38	—	6	—	—	176	BPI: Silver
1996	The Best of Van Morrison Vol 1 & 2	—	21	—	—	—	—	—	—	—	—	—	
1998	The Philosopher's Stone	20	28	91	52	—	80	11	17	14	—	87	
2000	The Great Van Morrison	—	—	—	—	—	—	—	—	—	—	—	ARIA: Gold
2007	Van Morrison at the Movies – Soundtrack Hits	17	29	28	63	9	16	8	10	12	98	35	BPI: Silver; IRE: Gold; NZ: Gold
2007	The Best of Van Morrison Volume 3	23	—	—	—	80	89	—	—	47	—	149	
2007	Still on Top – The Greatest Hits	2	15	—	—	3	25	3	14	1	96	48	BPI: Platinum; AUS: Gold; IRE: Platinum; NZ: Gold
2015	The Essential Van Morrison	33	23	86	—	18	88	—	6	—	—	101	BPI: Platinum; AUS: Gold
2017	The Authorized Bang Collection (Note: The Authorized Bang Collection peaked at #142 on the Belgian album charts in 2017.)	—	—	—	—	—	—	—	—	—	—	—	
2023	Beyond Words: Instrumental (previously unreleased tracks from the 1970's, 1980's, 1990's, 2000's)	—	—	—	—	—	—	—	—	—	—	—	
"—" denotes items that did not chart or were not released in that territory.

=== Remix albums ===
Title	Album details	Notes
The Alternative Moondance	Released: 21 April 2018; Label: Warner (#R1 566244); Format: LP	Album composed of alternative mixes of Moondance.; Released exclusively for Record Store Day.

=== Unauthorised compilations ===
- T.B. Sheets (1973)
- This Is Where I Came In (1982)
- Bang Masters (1991)
- Payin' Dues (1994)
- The Complete New York Sessions '67 (1997)
- Super Hits (1999)
- The Complete Bang Sessions (2002)

== Video albums ==
Title	Video details	Peak chart positions										Certifications
Title	Video details	UK	AUS	AUT	BEL	CAN	GER	IRE	NED	SPA	US	Certifications
Van Morrison in Ireland	Released: 1980; Label: Angle Films	—	—	—	—	—	—	—	—	—	—	
Van Morrison: The Concert	Released: 1990; Label: Polygram Music Video	—	—	—	—	2	—	—	—	—	12	
Live at Montreux 1980/1974	Released: 16 October 2006; Label: Eagle Vision	1	4	—	9	—	—	—	6	—	18	AUS: Platinum; CAN: Platinum; IRE: Platinum; RIAA: Platinum
Astral Weeks Live at the Hollywood Bowl: The Concert Film	Released: 19 May 2009; Label: Listen To The Lion Records	—	—	—	—	—	—	—	—	—	—	
Live in Austin, Texas 2006	Released: 1 December 2014; Label: Immortal	—	—	—	—	—	—	—	—	—	—	
In Concert	Released: 16 February 2018; Label: Eagle Rock Entertainment	2	—	2	3	—	51	2	1	6	2	
"—" denotes items that did not chart or were not released in that territory.

== Session work ==
=== Performance ===
Year	Release	Song	Artist
1971	Cahoots	"4% Pantomime"	The Band
1972	Never Get Out of These Blues Alive	"Never Get Out of These Blues Alive"	John Lee Hooker
1991	Mr. Lucky	"I Cover the Waterfront"	John Lee Hooker
1995	Chill Out	"Medley: Serves Me Right to Suffer / Syndicator"	John Lee Hooker
1997	Deuces Wild	"If You Love Me"	B.B. King
1999	Reload	"Sometimes We Cry"	Tom Jones
2000	Sailing to Philadelphia	"The Last Laugh"	Mark Knopfler
2002	Jools Holland's Big Band Rhythm & Blues	"Back o' Town Blues"	Jools Holland
2004	Genius Loves Company	"Crazy Love"	Ray Charles
2005	B.B. King & Friends: 80	"Early in the Morning"	B.B. King
2019	Sinematic	"I Hear You Paint Houses"	Robbie Robertson
2020	Blues with Friends	"I Got Nothin'"	Dion

=== Production ===
Year	Release	
1976	"Sweet Sixteen"	Jackie DeShannon
1994	No Prima Donna: The Songs of Van Morrison	various
1997	Don't Look Back	John Lee Hooker

== Other documented performances ==
- The Last Waltz (1978)
- The Wall – Live in Berlin (1990)
- One Irish Rover BBC2 Arena TV (1991)
- The Blues: Red, White, and Blues Martin Scorsese documentary series (2003)
- Austin City Limits: Van Morrison PBS-TV episode (2006)
