= Almost Independence Day =

Song by Van Morrison

from the album Saint Dominic's Preview
- Released: July 1972
- Recorded: Autumn 1971
- Studio: Pacific High (San Francisco)
- Genre: Folk rock, R&B
- Length: 10:05
- Label: Warner Bros. Records
- Songwriter(s): Van Morrison
- Producer(s): Ted Templeman, Van Morrison

Saint Dominic's Preview track listing
- 7 tracks: 1. "Jackie Wilson Said (I'm in Heaven When You Smile)"; 2. "Gypsy"; 3. "I Will Be There"; 4. "Listen to the Lion"; 5. "Saint Dominic's Preview"; 6. "Redwood Tree"; 7. "Almost Independence Day"

"Almost Independence Day" is the closing song on Northern Irish singer-songwriter Van Morrison's 1972 album Saint Dominic's Preview. The song is ten minutes long and features Morrison trading guitar licks with Ron Elliott.

== Recording ==
"Almost Independence Day" was recorded during the session at the Pacific High Studios in San Francisco, California for Saint Dominic's Preview in autumn 1971. Morrison had previously recorded a live set at the studio in front of a small audience for broadcast on FM radio for the local KSAN station on 5 September. Phill Sawyer, a technician that worked there at the time, said that the studio "was a big enough room so that you could most often find a solution – you could create sub-areas and screen off the rest of the room with portable acoustic panels." He went on to say: "I don't know how we got away with it, but we were able to have these large gatherings of people in the studio even though the whole building had only one exit door – which opened inward into a closet sized space in which it was awkward for even just 2 people to maneuver out of the building. Oh yes, we also had one always-locked sliding freight door."

The track was recorded live except for one high part on a Moog synthesizer (played by Bernie Krause of "Space Odyssey" with The Byrds fame). Morrison said he had "asked Krause to do this thing of Chinatown and then come in with the high part because I was thinking of dragons and fireworks." Krause had worked with Morrison on his previous album, Tupelo Honey, but his contribution was uncredited. Mark Naftalin's low Moog drone is noted as being one of the first times the musical device was used on the instrument in popular music, along with The Who's "Baba O'Riley".

"Almost Independence Day" is the only song released by Morrison to feature guitarist Ron Elliott (best known as a member of The Beau Brummels) and jazz double bassist, Leroy Vinnegar. Jazz drummer Lee Charlton was only recruited by Morrison for this recording session, but also played on outtake "Wonderful Remark", which was released on the 1998 album The Philosopher's Stone.

== Composition ==
"Almost Independence Day" is written in a stream of consciousness style and has been said to be a sequel to "Madame George", despite Morrison stating that was not his intention: "It wasn't my concept to write a sequel to 'Madame George'. I like the song though ... It was a stream of consciousness trip again."

The song is a two-chord cycle in a minor key. It uses various musical and vocal techniques to translate to the listener the feelings the singer had while staring across the San Francisco harbour. Comparisons have been made between Saint Dominic's Preview's longest tracks, "Almost Independence Day" and "Listen to the Lion", as they are both more than ten minutes long, with the former being described as "musically daring in its own way". Erik Hage describes the song as "a mood piece, and a precursor to his 1980s work (particularly Common One), where his whole raison d'être became trying to inspire meditative states in the listener."

In a 1984 interview, Morrison recalls that he took a cue for the first line from the following incident:

I picked up the phone and the operator said, "You have a phone call from Oregon. It's Mister So-and-So." It was a guy from the group Them. And then there was nobody on the other end. So out of that I started writing, "I can hear Them calling, 'way from Oregon." That's where that came from.

== Critical analysis ==
Rolling Stone critic Stephen Holden wrote in 1972: "Structurally akin to 'Listen to the Lion', it duets Van and Ron Elliott on 12-string and 6-string guitar and effectively uses the Moog as a sort of foghorn bass. Grandly opening with references to the Stones' 'Moonlight Mile', the body of the song is an incantatory montage of simple portentous phrases repeated over and over with varying emotional emphasis...As in 'Listen to the Lion', the structure of the song is metamorphic, taking the form of a rising and subsiding wave."

Clinton Heylin believes that "'Almost Independence Day' is a grand failure, the first of its kind", comparing it negatively to "Madame George". He notes that "Wonderful Remark" would have been a better song to conclude on Saint Dominic's Preview, as it would have been "unafraid of comparison with previous works of stature". Biographer Peter Mills disputes this by commenting on Heylin's analysis:

Described by some as "an 11 minute jam" which is "filler", it seems to me rather the genesis or crossroads point of one of his methods of performance composition, that is, a discovery via actual performance of what he wants to say, and the nature of the song itself ... and revealed via performance and recording rather than meticulous rehearsal, drafting and redrafting. This song is a prime example of the stage workshop brought into the studio.

Greil Marcus writes that "As it went on, it seemed as if the song itself more than the singer was gazing out over San Francisco Bay to watch the fireworks; as that happened, the Fourth of July receded, and what was left was an unsettled, unclaimed, unfounded land where the event that settled it, named it, found it, had yet to take place."

== Personnel ==
- Van Morrison — twelve string guitar, vocal
- Lee Charlton — drums
- Ron Elliott — acoustic guitar
- Bernie Krause — moog synthesizer
- Mark Naftalin — piano, moog synthesizer
- Leroy Vinnegar — double bass
