= Listen to the Lion =

Song by Van Morrison

from the album Saint Dominic's Preview
- Released: July 1972
- Recorded: Spring/Summer 1971
- Studio: Columbia, San Francisco, California
- Genre: Folk rock, R&B
- Length: 11:07
- Label: Warner Bros.
- Songwriter: Van Morrison
- Producers: Ted Templeman, Van Morrison

Saint Dominic's Preview track listing
- 7 tracks: 1. "Jackie Wilson Said (I'm in Heaven When You Smile)"; 2. "Gypsy"; 3. "I Will Be There"; 4. "Listen to the Lion"; 5. "Saint Dominic's Preview"; 6. "Redwood Tree"; 7. "Almost Independence Day"

"Listen to the Lion" is a song written by Northern Irish singer-songwriter Van Morrison and featured on his sixth album, Saint Dominic's Preview (1972). Its poetic musings and "bass-led shuffle" lead back to Astral Weeks territory.

== Recording and composition ==
"Listen to the Lion" was first recorded during the sessions for Morrison's third solo album Moondance in 1969 but not used. The longer eleven-minute version that is featured on Saint Dominic's Preview was recorded during the 1971 sessions at the Columbia Studios in San Francisco and intended for the album Tupelo Honey.

Morrison plays guitar along with Ronnie Montrose. Connie Kay (drums on Astral Weeks) and Gary Mallaber (percussion and vibraphone on Moondance) are also featured players on this song. Mallaber revealed that during this session "There were two different takes. I did one and Connie did the other. They used the one with the live vibes, which is what I played live." Morrison, Montrose and Boots Houston perform the back-up vocals. According to Ritchie Yorke, "Van used his voice so superbly in this track that it seemed to become part of the instrumentation... Van's schooling in the art of R&B repetition was never adapted so perfectly."

== Significance ==
"Listen to the Lion" has been said to rank amongst Morrison's greatest work. "During the 11-minute voyage, he sings, shouts, improvises lines, delays and omits them, until he symbolically re-creates the sound of an unleashed lion within himself. It remains a considerable achievement." (Johnny Rogan)

"Listen to the Lion" was one of the 1001 Songs written about in the 2006 book by critic Toby Creswell who says in part: "Listen to the Lion has almost no words, just the phrase 'Listen to the Lion inside of me'...He sings the phrases like an incantation, sometimes desperate and longing for love and at other times boasting of the power of his passion; and then at other times he sings in despair that these emotions have brought him nothing but ruin. He doesn't need to speak, there's nothing more to be said..."

A sequel to this 1972 song was included on Morrison's 2005 album, Magic Time that was entitled, "The Lion This Time".

During the November 2008 concert performances at the Hollywood Bowl in Los Angeles, California, Morrison used this song as an encore after the live Astral Weeks song performances. It has been listed under a new extended title of "Listen to the Lion – The Lion Speaks" on the track listing of the live album Astral Weeks Live at the Hollywood Bowl. In a January 2009 interview, Morrison said: "I wanted to end the Astral Weeks set with 'Madame George'. I wanted to tell people at the end these songs are a 'train of thought' and leave it at that. I think 'Lion' is a song that is all me, as well, so I ended with that...It's a song I guess about me—probably the only one about me." Also showing the magnitude of this work to the composer is the announcement that Morrison's new record label will be entitled Listen to the Lion Records.

== Reception ==
Andy Whitman, a Paste reviewer called this song, "the quintessential Van Morrison moment, the most thrilling and thrillingly strange soul music—in all senses of the term—ever recorded. It's the sound of a man casting off all earthly bounds and battering down the gates of heaven."

Jay Cocks commented on the song: "You can hear Morrison courting this muse in the Pentecostal growls and incantations of Listen to the Lion on his 1972 album Saint Dominic's Preview..."

In his article on Morrison in the 1976 edition of the Rolling Stone History of Rock and Roll, critic Greil Marcus wrote, "Across 11 minutes, he [Morrison] sings, chants, moans, cries, pleads, shouts, hollers, whispers, until finally he breaks away from language and speaks in Irish tongues, breaking away from ordinary meaning until he has loosed the lion inside himself. He begins to roar: he has that sound, that yarrrrragh, as he has never had it before. He is not singing it, it is singing him."

Robert Christgau's review of Saint Dominic's Preview uses this song to point out that vocals are sometimes more important than words: "Listen to the lion," he [Morrison] advises later, referring to that lovely frightening beast inside each of us, and midway through the eleven-minute cut he lets the lion out, moaning and roaring and growling and stuttering in a scat extension that would do Leon Thomas proud."

== Live performances ==
Morrison's performance of this song was considered a concert highlight for several years during the 1970s. This song along with "Saint Dominic's Preview", "I Will Be There" and "Jackie Wilson Said (I'm in Heaven When You Smile)" were the only songs from the 1972 album that he performed live.

== Other releases ==
"Listen to the Lion" was one of the live performances recorded and included on Morrison's 1974 acclaimed live album, It's Too Late To Stop Now. After barking out demands for "water" like a dying man, his rendition of "Listen to the Lion" in this live performance ends in hushed quiet (like in a prayer) with an audibly awed audience. A live performance of "Listen to the Lion" as performed by Morrison with most of the Common One band members is featured on the 2006 released DVD, Live at Montreux 1980/1974. "Listen to the Lion" from Saint Dominic's Preview was remastered in 2007 and included on the limited 3CD edition of the compilation album, Still on Top - The Greatest Hits. The song was also featured on Morrison's 2009 album Astral Weeks Live at the Hollywood Bowl, recorded forty years after the classic album Astral Weeks was first released. "Listen to the Lion" is used as bonus material on the album along with "Common One".

== Personnel ==
- Van Morrison – vocals, guitar, backing vocals
- Ronnie Montrose – guitar, backing vocals
- Mark Jordan – piano
- Bill Church – bass
- Connie Kay – drums
- Gary Mallaber – percussion, vibraphone
- "Boots" Rolf Houston – backing vocals
