= Still on Top – The Greatest Hits =

Greatest hits album by Van Morrison
- Released: 22 October 2007
- Recorded: Various
- Genre: Various
- Label: Exile Productions Ltd./Polydor, Exile Productions Ltd./Hip-O, Universal Music Group
- Producer: Van Morrison

Van Morrison chronology
The Best of Van Morrison Volume 3 (2007)	Still on Top – The Greatest Hits (2007)	Keep It Simple (2008)

Professional ratings
Review scores
Source	Rating
bbc.co.uk	(unrated)
IndieLondon	5/5 stars
Inthenews.co.uk	7/10 stars
MEN Media	4/5 stars
AllMusic	4/5 stars
Tom Hull	A+

Still on Top – The Greatest Hits is the third compilation album to be issued by Northern Irish singer-songwriter Van Morrison in 2007. It was released 22 October 2007 in the UK in a two-CD album with 37 tracks and with a three-CD Digipak limited edition box set also available on initial release of the album in the UK. On 29 October 2007 it was listed at No. 2 on the UK Official Top 75 Albums, his highest charting ever. The album also charted at No. 3 on the Top 75 Albums in Ireland, his highest debut in that country. In its second week of release it topped the Swedish albums chart, and has since been certified gold.

It was released on 6 November 2007, in the U.S. and Canada on a single disc with 21 tracks and is also available as an MP3 download. The single disc album charted at No. 48 on the U.S. Billboard 200 and No. 37 in Canada on the Soundscan charts.

The tracks consist of Morrison's biggest hits from 1964 as leader of the Northern Irish band Them through his 2005 release Magic Time. It contains no tracks from Astral Weeks, A Period of Transition, Common One, How Long Has This Been Going On, Tell Me Something: The Songs of Mose Allison, You Win Again and Pay the Devil.

== Track listing ==
All songs written by Van Morrison except as noted and were remastered (with the symbol *) unless unspecified.

UK disc one
No.	Title	Original album	Length
1.	"Jackie Wilson Said (I'm in Heaven When You Smile)*"	Saint Dominic's Preview, 1972	2:58
2.	"Dweller on the Threshold*" (Morrison, Hugh Murphy)	Beautiful Vision, 1982	4:46
3.	"Whenever God Shines His Light*" (Duet with Cliff Richard)	Avalon Sunset, 1989	4:58
4.	"Moondance"	Moondance, 1970	4:33
5.	"Bright Side of the Road*"	Into the Music, 1979	3:46
6.	"Brown Eyed Girl"	Blowin' Your Mind!, 1967	3:04
7.	"Wavelength*"	Wavelength, 1978	5:45
8.	"Crazy Love"	Moondance	2:34
9.	"Someone Like You*"	Poetic Champions Compose, 1987	4:08
10.	"When Will I Ever Learn to Live in God?*"	Avalon Sunset	5:38
11.	"Tore Down a la Rimbaud*"	A Sense of Wonder, 1985	4:07
12.	"Wild Night*"	Tupelo Honey, 1971	3:31
13.	"Gloria" (Van Morrison with Them; Stereo version)	The Angry Young Them, 1965	2:38
14.	"Real Real Gone*"	Enlightenment, 1990	3:43
15.	"Into the Mystic"	Moondance	3:24
16.	"In the Garden*"	No Guru, No Method, No Teacher, 1986	5:46
17.	"Saint Dominic's Preview*"	Saint Dominic's Preview	6:22
18.	"Stranded" (Original album version)	Magic Time, 2005	5:32

UK disc two
No.	Title	Original album	Length
1.	"Precious Time*"	Back on Top, 1999	3:45
2.	"Domino"	His Band and the Street Choir, 1970	3:07
3.	"Here Comes the Night" (Van Morrison with Them; Bert Berns)	Non-album single, 1965	2:47
4.	"Little Village*"	What's Wrong with This Picture?, 2003	4:32
5.	"And It Stoned Me"	Moondance	4:29
6.	"Days Like This*"	Days Like This, 1995	3:13
7.	"Have I Told You Lately*"	Avalon Sunset	4:18
8.	"Cleaning Windows*"	Beautiful Vision	4:42
9.	"Baby, Please Don't Go" (Van Morrison with Them; Big Joe Williams)	Non-album single, 1965	2:37
10.	"Back on Top"	Back on Top	4:23
11.	"Vanlose Stairway*"	Beautiful Vision	4:08
12.	"Celtic New Year" (Original album version)	Magic Time	6:11
13.	"Irish Heartbeat*"	Irish Heartbeat, 1983	4:39
14.	"The Healing Game" (Alternate take)	Original version on The Healing Game, 1997	5:15
15.	"Full Force Gale*"	Into the Music	3:14
16.	"Warm Love*"	Hard Nose the Highway, 1973	3:23
17.	"Did Ye Get Healed?*"	Poetic Champions Compose	4:06
18.	"Tupelo Honey*"	Tupelo Honey	6:56
19.	"Wonderful Remark*"	The King of Comedy soundtrack, 1983	3:59

UK disc three (bonus disc)
No.	Title	Original album	Length
1.	"Hey Mr. DJ*"	Down the Road, 2002	3:44
2.	"In the Forest*"	Too Long in Exile, 1993	4:37
3.	"Queen of the Slipstream*"	Poetic Champions Compose	4:54
4.	"Rave On, John Donne*"	Inarticulate Speech of the Heart	5:13
5.	"Hymns to the Silence*"	Hymns to the Silence, 1991	9:41
6.	"Crazy Jane on God*" (William Mathieu, William Butler Yeats)	The Philosopher's Stone, 1998	4:05
7.	"Rough God Goes Riding*"	The Healing Game	6:20
8.	"Steal My Heart Away*"	Down the Road	4:20
9.	"One Irish Rover*"	No Guru, No Method, No Teacher	3:29
10.	"Listen to the Lion*"	Saint Dominic's Preview	11:08
11.	"Streets of Arklow*"	Veedon Fleece, 1974	4:23
12.	"The Beauty of the Days Gone By*"	Down the Road	5:45
13.	"Take It Where You Find It*"	Wavelength	8:40
14.	"Coney Island*"	Avalon Sunset	2:00

U.S. and Canada single-disc version
No.	Title	Original album	Length
1.	"Gloria" (Van Morrison with Them; Stereo version)	The Angry Young Them	2:38
2.	"Here Comes the Night" (Van Morrison with Them; Berns)	Non-album single	2:47
3.	"Brown Eyed Girl"	Blowin' Your Mind	3:04
4.	"Moondance"	Moondance	4:33
5.	"Crazy Love"	Moondance	2:34
6.	"Domino"	His Band and the Street Choir	3:07
7.	"Wild Night"	Tupelo Honey	3:31
8.	"Jackie Wilson Said (I'm in Heaven When You Smile)"	Saint Dominic's Preview	2:58
9.	"Warm Love"	Hard Nose the Highway	3:23
10.	"Wavelength" (Early fade)	Wavelength	5:19
11.	"Bright Side of the Road"	Into the Music	3:46
12.	"Dweller on the Threshold" (Morrison, Murphy)	Live at Grand Opera House Belfest	3:38
13.	"Tore Down a la Rimbaud"	A Sense of Wonder	4:07
14.	"In the Garden"	No Guru, No Method, No Teacher	5:46
15.	"Someone Like You"	Poetic Champions Compose	4:08
16.	"Have I Told You Lately"	Avalon Sunset	4:18
17.	"Real Real Gone"	Enlightenment	3:43
18.	"Days Like This"	Days Like This	3:13
19.	"The Healing Game" (Alternate take)	Original version on The Healing Game	4:25
20.	"Precious Time"	Back on Top	3:45
21.	"Stranded" (Early fade)	Magic Time	4:48

== Charts ==
=== Weekly charts ===
Chart (2007–2008)	Peak position
Australian Albums (ARIA)	15
Austrian Albums (Ö3 Austria)	67
Belgian Albums (Ultratop Flanders)	58
Danish Albums (Hitlisten)	37
Dutch Albums (Album Top 100)	25
Irish Albums (IRMA)	3
New Zealand Albums (RMNZ)	14
Norwegian Albums (VG-lista)	3
Scottish Albums (OCC)	2
Spanish Albums (PROMUSICAE)	14
Swedish Albums (Sverigetopplistan)	1
Swiss Albums (Schweizer Hitparade)	96
UK Albums (OCC)	2
US Billboard 200	48
US Top Rock Albums (Billboard)	14

=== Year-end charts ===
Chart (2007)	Position
UK Albums (OCC)	63
Chart (2008)	Position
Swedish Albums (Sverigetopplistan)	26

== Certifications ==
Region	Certification	Certified units/sales
Australia (ARIA)	Gold	35,000^{^}
Ireland (IRMA)	Platinum	15,000^{^}
Sweden (GLF)	Gold	20,000^{^}
United Kingdom (BPI)	Platinum	300,000^{*}
^{*} Sales figures based on certification alone.^{^} Shipments figures based on certification alone.
