= Stranded (Van Morrison song) =

Song by Van Morrison

from the album Magic Time
- Released: 17 May 2005
- Recorded: 25 August 2003
- Genre: Celtic rock
- Length: 5:34
- Label: Geffen Records
- Songwriter(s): Van Morrison
- Producer(s): Van Morrison

Magic Time track listing
- 1. "Stranded" – 5:34; 2. "Celtic New Year" – 6:10; 3. "Keep Mediocrity At Bay" – 3:44; 4. "Evening Train" – 2:48; 5. "This Love of Mine" (Sol Parker, Henry W. Sanicola, Frank Sinatra) – 2:42; 6. "I'm Confessin'" (Doc Daughtery, Al Neiburg, Ellis Reynolds) – 4:29; 7. "Just Like Greta" – 6:25; 8. "Gypsy In My Soul" – 4:04; 9. "Lonely And Blue" (Brooks, Andy Razaf, Waller) – 3:41; 10. "The Lion This Time" – 4:56; 11. "Magic Time" – 5:06; 12. "They Sold Me Out" – 3:11; 13. "Carry On Regardless" – 5:54

"Stranded" is the opening track on Northern Irish singer-songwriter Van Morrison's 2005 album Magic Time. It is one of the ten original songs written by Morrison that were included on the well-received album.

As described in Allmusic:

"Stranded" has a gorgeous faux doo wop lilt, and an elegant, timeless piano that cascades from the ether as a nocturnal alto saxophone (Morrison) who announces a stolid yet world-weary vocal that unhurriedly moves along to a backing chorus. One can hear traces of The Platters' "Twilight Time" and The Penguins' "Earth Angel" in its grain.

In the lyrics of the song, the singer laments being confused and isolated in a modern world from which he feels disconnected:

I’m stranded at the edge of the world
It’s a world I don’t know

BC Music's reviewer Aaman Lamba notes: "Stranded" is a typical Morrison piece, dealing with being stranded on the shores of a new world, a world changed. A thoughtful piece, it features a saxophone section of some worth." (This was played by Morrison.)

It's leaving me stranded
In my own little island
With my eyes open wide
But I'm feeling stranded

Morrison has frequently performed this song in his live concerts since releasing it.

== Appearance on other albums ==
- It is included on the 2007 compilation album, The Best of Van Morrison Volume 3
- It also featured on the 2007 compilation album, Still on Top - The Greatest Hits.

== Personnel on original release ==
- Van Morrison – vocals, alto saxophone
- Brian Connor – piano
- Foggy Lyttle – guitar
- David Hayes – bass
- Liam Bradley – drums, backing vocals
- Jerome Rimson – backing vocals
