= You've Got the Power =

You've Got the Power may refer to:

- You've Got the Power (Van Morrison song)
- You've Got the Power (James Brown song)
- You've Got the Power, a song by The Esquires
