= You've Got the Power (Van Morrison song) =

Song by Van Morrison
- A-side: "Jackie Wilson Said (I'm in Heaven When You Smile)"
- Released: 14 July 1972
- Recorded: Late winter/spring, 1972
- Studio: Pacific High (San Francisco); The Church (San Anselmo
- Genre: R&B; soul
- Length: 3:37
- Label: Warner Bros. Records
- Songwriter(s): Van Morrison
- Producer(s): Van Morrison

"You've Got the Power" is an outtake from Van Morrison's 1972 album, Saint Dominic's Preview. It was released as the B-side to "Jackie Wilson Said (I'm in Heaven When You Smile)" in 1972.

== Composition ==
The song features the same personnel as on "I Will Be There" from Saint Dominic's Preview, but with Tom Salisbury on Hammond organ as well as piano and Jules Broussard doubling up on flute. Biographer Peter Mills commented that "The ensemble performance on 'You've Got the Power' is a mighty-sounding thing, righteous and powerful in its proclamation." The song uses staccato organ over the horn section.

The song contains lines from two other previously released Morrison songs: "Sweet Thing" and "I've Been Working". The line, "Baby with your saint like smile" was originally used at the end of "Sweet Thing" just before the song faded out. "Set my soul on fire" was first used in "I've Been Working". There is also an out-take, recorded in 1969 from the Moondance sessions, entitled "Set My Soul on Fire".

== Highlights ==
"You've Got the Power" was to feature in a compilation of outtakes called Highlights in 1977, but the album was never released. Clinton Heylin says "The fourteen-track album Warners compiled only included two songs that pre-dated Hard Nose the Highway: 'I Shall Sing' from Moondance sessions and a 1972 non-album B-side, 'You've Got the Power'."

== Response ==
Peter Mills has said that this song is "one of the best examples we have of Morrison's voice working in a fully integrated way with the superb band that blasted on to the concert stages in the 70s".

== Personnel ==
- Van Morrison - vocals
- Jack Schroer - alto saxophone
- Jules Broussard - tenor saxophone, flute
- Doug Messenger - guitar
- Tom Salisbury - piano, Hammond organ
- Bill Church - bass
- Gary Mallaber - drums

== Covers ==
- Roy Head on Dismal Prisoner
