= Warm Love =

1973 song by Van Morrison

Single by Van Morrison

from the album Hard Nose the Highway
- A-side: "Warm Love"
- B-side: "I Will Be There"
- Released: 25 April 1973
- Recorded: 1972
- Genre: Folk rock, R&B
- Length: 3:22
- Label: Warner Bros.
- Songwriter: Van Morrison
- Producer: Van Morrison

Van Morrison singles chronology
"Gypsy" (1973)	"Warm Love" (1973)	"Bein' Green" (1973)

"Warm Love" is a hit song written by Northern Irish singer-songwriter Van Morrison.

The song was included on his 1973 album Hard Nose the Highway. It was a Top Forty single hit when released in April 1973. Jackie DeShannon sang back-up vocals.

== Comments ==
ZigZag's review called it "a second cousin to 'Crazy Love' and almost as good." It was a popular concert performance tune for Morrison during the seventies.

Stephen Holden in his Rolling Stone review of the Hard Nose the Highway songs said, "Next is the ingratiatingly melodic 'Warm Love', which embodies in all its details a sensuous appreciation of life and music." Billboard praised Morrison's vocal performance.

Cash Box said that "Van Morrison returns to his "Crazy Love" style" for a song that "should continue his string of hits." Record World said that "it is a mellower sound for singer/songwriter than many of his previous 45s."

Van Morrison said:

"It is just a boy and girl song, walking on the beach. It's a young song. I can't really add to that, except to note that this is a musical love affair, with the girl bringing her guitar."

== Other releases ==
"Warm Love" was one of the songs included on Morrison's 1974 acclaimed live album, It's Too Late to Stop Now. This version of the song was also featured as the B-side of the single "Gloria", only released in Germany. It was also included on the compilation album The Best of Van Morrison that was released in 1990, and is one of the hits remastered and included on Morrison's 2007 compilation album, Still on Top – The Greatest Hits.

== Personnel ==
- Van Morrison – vocals, acoustic guitar
- David Hayes – bass guitar
- Jules Broussard – flute
- Jackie DeShannon – backing vocals
- Jeff Labes – piano
- Gary Mallaber – vibraphone drums
- John Platania – guitar
- Jack Schroer – soprano saxophone

== Covers ==
- Johnny Coppin on Roll On Dreamer
- Kim Carnes on Sailin'
- Otis Clay on Vanthology: a Tribute to Van Morrison
- General Public on Rub It Better
