= The Best of Van Morrison =

Greatest hits album by Van Morrison
- Released: March 1990
- Recorded: 1964−1989
- Length: 76:14
- Label: Polydor
- Producers: Bert Berns, Lewis Merenstein, Van Morrison, Dick Rowe, Ted Templeman

Van Morrison chronology
Avalon Sunset (1989)	The Best of Van Morrison (1990)	Enlightenment (1990)

The Best of Van Morrison is a compilation album by Northern Irish singer-songwriter Van Morrison. It compiles songs spanning 25 years of his recording career. Released in 1990 by Polydor Records, the album was a critical and commercial success, becoming one of the best-selling records of the 1990s and helping revive Morrison's mainstream popularity. Its success encouraged him to release a second and third greatest hits volume in 1993 and 2007, respectively. The album remains Morrison's best-seller.

== Release and reception ==
Professional ratings
Review scores
Source	Rating
AllMusic	5/5 stars
Encyclopedia of Popular Music	5/5 stars
Q	5/5 stars
The Rolling Stone Album Guide	5/5 stars
The Village Voice	A

The Best of Van Morrison was Morrison's first greatest hits album and featured songs that were compiled from 25 years of material including "Wonderful Remark", a song which first appeared on the soundtrack to the 1983 film The King of Comedy. The album became one of the best-selling records of the 1990s, spending a year and a half on the UK charts, helping Morrison regain his commercial popularity during the decade. It also debuted at number one in Australia on the ARIA Albums Chart. In the United States, the album never reached the Top 40 of the Billboard 200 but remained on the chart for more than four-and-a-half years. In 2002, the album was certified quadruple platinum by the Recording Industry Association of America (RIAA), having shipped four million copies in the US. Morrison was reluctant at first to have a greatest hits album released, although its success encouraged him to personally select tracks for the second and third volumes in 1993 and 2007, respectively. "As the story goes, Van Morrison wanted nothing to do with his first greatest hits collection", wrote Andrew Gilstrap from PopMatters. "He probably warmed up to the idea, though, after the sales figures started pouring in—year after year after year."

The Best of Van Morrison was acclaimed by critics from Goldmine and Q magazine, who called it essential. In a contemporary review for The Village Voice, Robert Christgau said although the songs are not sequenced chronologically, the album flows as a unified and "spiritually enlightened" work that also reflects the compilers "upbeat market savvy". He took note of the seven songs from Morrison's music in the 1980s, particularly "Wonderful Remark", writing that they live up to the standards of his 1970s albums Moondance (1970) and Into the Music (1979). In a retrospective review for AllMusic, Stephen Thomas Erlewine viewed the record as an exceptional compilation and a perfect sampler of Morrison's music, which is made to "seem a little more immediate and accessible than it usually is" on his studio albums. The Best of Van Morrison remains his best-selling release.

== Track listing ==
All tracks are written by Van Morrison, unless otherwise noted.

No.	Title	Writer(s)	Original album	Length
1.	"Bright Side of the Road"		Into the Music (1979)	3:45
2.	"Gloria" (with Them)		The Angry Young Them (1965)	2:37
3.	"Moondance"		Moondance (1970)	4:31
4.	"Baby, Please Don't Go" (with Them)	Big Joe Williams	single	2:40
5.	"Have I Told You Lately"		Avalon Sunset (1989)	4:18
6.	"Brown Eyed Girl" (radio edit)		Blowin' Your Mind! (1967)	3:03
7.	"Sweet Thing"		Astral Weeks (1968)	4:22
8.	"Warm Love"		Hard Nose the Highway (1973)	3:21
9.	"Wonderful Remark"		The King of Comedy soundtrack (1983)	3:58
10.	"Jackie Wilson Said (I'm in Heaven When You Smile)"		Saint Dominic's Preview (1972)	2:57
11.	"Full Force Gale"		Into the Music	3:12
12.	"And It Stoned Me"		Moondance	4:30
13.	"Here Comes the Night" (with Them)	Bert Berns	Them (1965)	2:46
14.	"Domino"		His Band and the Street Choir (1970)	3:08
15.	"Did Ye Get Healed?"		Poetic Champions Compose (1987)	4:06
16.	"Wild Night"		Tupelo Honey (1971)	3:31
17.	"Cleaning Windows"		Beautiful Vision (1982)	4:42
18.	"Whenever God Shines His Light" (duet with Cliff Richard)		Avalon Sunset	4:54
19.	"Queen of the Slipstream"		Poetic Champions Compose	4:53
20.	"Dweller on the Threshold"	Van Morrison; Hugh Murphy	Beautiful Vision	4:47
Total length:				76:14

Notes

- The 1998 Australian/New Zealand re-release of the album also includes "Days Like This" (3:13) (from the 1995 album of the same name) as the seventh track, for a total of 21 tracks.
- In 1998, the album was remastered and re-released, this time with the original stereo album version of "Brown-Eyed Girl".
- The original LP omitted "Wonderful Remark", "Full Force Gale", "Queen of the Slipstream" and "Dweller on the Threshold". The original cassette only omitted the latter two tracks.
- Notably absent is "Blue Money" from His Band and the Street Choir.

== Personnel ==
Credits are adapted from the album's liner notes.

- Bert Berns – producer (tracks 6 and 13)
- Mick Glossop – engineer (tracks 5 and 18)
- Lewis Merenstein – producer (track 7)
- Van Morrison – primary artist, producer (tracks 1, 3, 5, 8, 10 to 12, and 14 to 20)
- Cliff Richard – guest vocalist (track 18)
- Robbie Robertson – producer (track 9)
- Dick Rowe – producer (tracks 2 and 4)
- Ted Templeman – producer (tracks 10 and 16)
- Them – primary artist (tracks 2, 4, and 13)

== Charts ==
=== Weekly charts ===
Chart (1990)	Peak position
Australian Albums (ARIA)	1
Dutch Albums (Album Top 100)	13
New Zealand Albums (RMNZ)	3
Norwegian Albums (VG-lista)	6
Swedish Albums (Sverigetopplistan)	9
UK Albums (Official Charts)	4
US Billboard 200	41

Chart (1994)	Peak position
Scottish Albums (Official Charts)	15

=== Year-end charts ===
Chart (1990)	Position
Australian Albums (ARIA)	22
Dutch Albums (Album Top 100)	72
New Zealand Albums (RMNZ)	33
US Billboard 200	97
Chart (1993)	Position
Australian Albums (ARIA)	42
New Zealand Albums (RMNZ)	44
Chart (1994)	Position
Australian Albums (ARIA)	59
Chart (1995)	Position
Australian Albums (ARIA)	86

== Certifications ==
Region	Certification	Certified units/sales
Australia (ARIA)	5× Platinum	350,000^{^}
Canada (Music Canada)	2× Platinum	200,000^{^}
Norway (IFPI Norway)	Platinum	50,000^{*}
United Kingdom (BPI) 1998 release	2× Platinum	600,000^{*}
United States (RIAA)	4× Platinum	4,000,000^{^}
^{*} Sales figures based on certification alone.^{^} Shipments figures based on certification alone.

== Bibliography ==
- Heylin, Clinton (2003). Can You Feel the Silence? Van Morrison: A New Biography, Chicago Review Press ISBN 1-55652-542-7
