= Magic Time (Van Morrison album) =

Studio album by Van Morrison
- Released: 17 May 2005
- Recorded: November 2000 and 2003
- Studios: The Wool Hall (Beckington, UK); Windmill Lane (Dublin, Ireland)
- Genres: Celtic rock, Blues, R&B
- Length: 58:45
- Label: Geffen
- Producer: Van Morrison for Exile Productions

Van Morrison chronology
What's Wrong with This Picture? (2003)	Magic Time (2005)	Pay the Devil (2006)

Singles from Magic Time
- 1. "Celtic New Year" Released: 2005

Magic Time is the thirty-first studio album by Van Morrison, released in 2005 by Geffen Records. It debuted at No. 25 on the US Billboard charts and No. 3 in the UK - Morrison's best UK chart debut until Still on Top – The Greatest Hits opened at No. 2 in 2007. Rolling Stone ranked 'Magic Time' seventeenth on The Top 50 Records of 2005.

== Recording ==
The album covers a variety of styles ranging from Celtic rock to R&B and the blues. "Just Like Greta" was recorded in 2000 and originally intended for 2002's Down the Road (when the album was tentatively titled Choppin' Wood), but it was ultimately dropped and used for this album. The rest of the songs were recorded in 2003.

== Composition ==
The title song is about a nostalgic searching of the past in order to capture a magic moment almost lost in memory. "The Lion This Time" is a continuation over thirty years later of "Listen to the Lion" that first appeared on his album Saint Dominic's Preview. There is a nursery rhyme quality to it as with its predecessor and a delicate use of a classical string arrangement. "Gypsy in My Soul" is also reminiscent of a song "Gypsy" from Saint Dominic's Preview. "Just Like Greta" and "Stranded" have similar themes of being lost in an alien world with only oneself to rely on. "Celtic New Year" is reminiscent of Irish Heartbeat. "Carry On Regardless" is a singing list of "Carry On Films" that Morrison seemed to have a special fondness for.

== Reception ==
Professional ratings
Aggregate scores
Source	Rating
Metacritic	74/100
Review scores
Source	Rating
Allmusic	4/5 stars
BC Music	(unrated)
Entertainment Weekly	A−
Music Box	4/5 stars
Paste	(unrated)
Rolling Stone	3.5/5 stars

In a review for Paste, Andy Whitman wrote: "You expect to encounter a tired legend, a once-mighty king becalmed and tamed by the miles and years. You find instead an echo of a full-throated roar hanging in the air, the telltale signs of a bloody struggle, and an empty cage. The lion in winter is on the loose".

Thom Jurek of Allmusic concludes that "[the] acoustic 'The Lion This Time' is one of the finest ballads Morrison has cut in decades. Period." He finds that "Celtic New Year" is "trademark Morrison; the long, loping, repetitive line that is his trademark fuels this one. It's carried by the interplay between Morrison's acoustic and Foggy Lyttle's electric guitar fills, and aided by Chieftain Paddy Moloney's whistle."

The Music Box rated Magic Time the number seven album of the year in May 2005.

By the end of 2005, Magic Time had sold 252,000 copies in the United States, according to Nielsen SoundScan.

== Liner notes ==
On the first page of the liner notes is the notation: "This album is dedicated to the memory of Foggy Lyttle who played on most of the tracks."

== Track listing ==
All songs by Van Morrison; unless otherwise noted

1. "Stranded" – 5:34
2. "Celtic New Year" – 6:10
3. "Keep Mediocrity at Bay" – 3:44
4. "Evening Train" – 2:48
5. "This Love of Mine" (Sol Parker, Henry W. Sanicola, Frank Sinatra) – 2:42
6. "I'm Confessin'" (Doc Daughtery, Al Neiburg, Ellis Reynolds) – 4:29
7. "Just Like Greta" – 6:25
8. "Gypsy in My Soul" – 4:04
9. "Lonely and Blue" ("Black and Blue" with altered lyrics) (Harry Brooks, Andy Razaf, Fats Waller) – 3:41
10. "The Lion This Time" – 4:56
11. "Magic Time" – 5:06
12. "They Sold Me Out" – 3:11
13. "Carry On Regardless" – 5:54

== Personnel ==
Musicians:

- Van Morrison – vocals, electric guitar, acoustic guitar, harmonica, alto saxophone
- Mick Green – guitar
- Foggy Lyttle – guitar
- Michael Fields – Spanish guitar, lute
- Martin Winning – tenor and baritone saxophones
- Matt Holland – trumpet
- Paddy Moloney – whistle
- Myles Drennan – piano, Hammond organ
- Brian Connor – piano, keyboards
- Dave Lewis – piano
- John Allair – Hammond organ
- Jerome Rimson – bass, backing vocals
- David Hayes – bass
- Liam Bradley – drums, backing vocals
- Noel Bridgeman, Johnathan Mele née Jonathan Mele, Bobby Irwin – drums
- Johnny Scott, Siobhan Pettit, Olwin Bell, Crawford Bell, Aine Whelan, Karen Hamill – backing vocals
- Irish Film Orchestra – strings

Production:

- Richard Evans – Design and art direction, sleeve photographs
- Tim Young at Metropolis Mastering, London – Mastering
- Javier Pierini/Getty Images – Front cover photograph
- Solly Lipsitz – Sleeve notes

== Charts ==
Album – UK Album Chart

Year	Chart	Position
2005	UK Album Chart	3

Album – Billboard

Year	Chart	Position
2005	The Billboard 200	25
2005	Top Internet Albums	25

Chart (2005)	Peak position
Norway	6
Australia	15
Denmark	4
Spain	5
Italy	10
Netherlands	10
