= Saint Dominic's Preview (song) =

Single by Van Morrison

from the album Saint Dominic's Preview
- A-side: "Redwood Tree"; "Gypsy"
- Released: July 1972
- Recorded: April 1972
- Studio: Wally Heider Studios
- Genre: Folk rock; R&B
- Length: 6:23
- Label: Warner Bros.
- Songwriter(s): Van Morrison
- Producer(s): Ted Templeman; Van Morrison

Van Morrison singles chronology
"Jackie Wilson Said (I'm in Heaven When You Smile)" (1972)	"Saint Dominic's Preview" (1972)	"Gypsy" (1973)

"Saint Dominic's Preview" is the title song of the sixth album by Northern Irish singer-songwriter Van Morrison, released in July 1972 by Warner Bros. It was recorded at the Wally Heider Studios in San Francisco in April 1972, with overdubs made later on. Morrison wrote it in a stream of consciousness in the same vein as some of his earlier works, particularly those on Astral Weeks. The song's narrative moves from France to San Francisco, Morrison's place of residence at the time, to Belfast, where he grew up, to New York City ("52nd Street apartment").

Saint Dominic's Preview has been described as one of his most allusive, containing wide-ranging references including The Troubles, Morrison's pre-fame career cleaning windows, Notre-Dame cathedral and the vicissitudes of the recording industry. The song also mentions Edith Piaf, Irish poet W. B. Yeats, country singer Hank Williams and the California supermarket chain Safeway. Gary Mallaber and Jack Schroer (from the Moondance album) play drums and saxophone respectively and Morrison's then wife, Janet Planet, is one of the back-up vocalists.

"Saint Dominic's Preview" has also been released on the live recordings It's Too Late to Stop Now and Van Morrison in Ireland, as well as the compilation album Still on Top - The Greatest Hits.

== Writing ==
It has been difficult for biographers and music reviewers to accurately identify some of the words used in "Saint Dominic's Preview"'s lyrics, as they were not published in the album sleeve at the time of its release. This led to some incorrect interpretations of the song before an official lyric sheet was published. The words emote different settings, but do not form an obvious story, as they describe a variety of subjects, such as cleaning windows, Edith Piaf's soul, W. B. Yeats and Hank Williams.

"Saint Dominic's Preview" begins with references to Morrison's youth, working as a window cleaner in Belfast. He uses the word chamois (the leather used to clean windows) as a pun to link the French word to two aspects of French culture: singer Edith Piaf, with her song "Non, je ne regrette rien", and Cathedral Notre-Dame in Paris. The line "It's a long way to Buffalo/It's a long way to Belfast city too" is believed to refer to the homesickness that Morrison experienced living in the US at the time, because of the situation in Belfast. Whilst touring on the West Coast, drummer Gary Mallaber recalled a conversation he had with Morrison about how he missed Buffalo, New York: "he wrote that [line] in 'Saint Dominic's Preview'. 'It's a long way to Buffalo/it's a long way to Belfast City too' – that was him crying out, saying, 'Well, you know what, I would like to return to my place too, 'cause I miss it.'" Morrison revealed to journalists in 1972: "I don't think I want to go back to Belfast. I don't miss it with all that prejudice around. We're all the same and I think it's terrible what's happening. But I think I'd like to get a house in Ireland. I'd like to spend a few months there every year."

Morrison revealed that the song came to him in a stream of consciousness, but only found out afterwards that a mass was being held in a St. Dominic's church in San Francisco for peace in Belfast. He told John Grissim:

I'd been working on this song about the scene going down in Belfast. And I wasn't sure what I was writing but the central image seemed to be this church called St Dominic's where people were gathering to pray or hear a mass for peace in Northern Ireland. A few weeks later I was playing at a gig in Reno, Nevada. I picked up a newspaper, and there in front of me was an announcement about a mass for peace in Belfast to be said the next day at St Dominic's Church in San Francisco. Totally blew me out. Like I'd never even heard of a St Dominic's Church.

There are also references to "orange" boxes, "flags and emblems" and people determined "not to feel anyone else's pain", which are seen by some as allusions to the situation in Belfast. Biographer Clinton Heylin thought that "It was [a] surprising subject matter simply because of Morrison's long-standing decision not to address this volatile issue." Morrison later rejected the idea that the song had any political meaning, claiming that it was not written "with anything in mind ... [it] is just a stream of consciousness. It doesn't mean any particular thing. It's a sketch ... the words, the syllables, just came out of my mouth and I wrote them down."

In the lines "You got ev'rything in the world you ever wanted/And right about now your face should wear a smile", Morrison's personal life and successful career are covered, with references to the dishonesty of the music business, and his own self-pity and longing for a home that did not exist any more.

Peter Mills identifies that the chorus is the element that brings the song together: "Through it all, Saint Dominic's Preview remains. It is that which holds the song together, and unifies the apparently unconnected, resolving fracture through re-imagining what it means to belong: in this, the song is indeed a helpful observation of the situation in Northern Ireland in the early 1970s."

== Recording and composition ==
"Saint Dominic's Preview" was recorded during the final session for the album at the Wally Heider Studios, San Francisco in April 1972. The band members present were Doug Messenger (guitar), Bill Church (bass), Gary Mallaber (drums), Tom Salisbury (piano), Jack Schroer and Jules Broussard (saxophones), with Janet Planet, Ellen Schroer and Mark Springer providing backing vocals as part of the Street Choir (Morrison's vocal backing group at the time). Jim Gaines, employed at the Wally Heider Studios, was the engineer at the session. Pianist Tom Salisbury made the arrangements for the song, along with "I Will Be There" and "Redwood Tree", which were also recorded at the final session. Salisbury had perfect pitch, which made it easy for him to write down the charts over the phone with instruction from Morrison. Salisbury was happy with the first take, even though ten takes were eventually made during the session. Doug Messenger recalled: "When we recorded "St. Dominic's," every take was more powerful that the last. Quite an experience. Mallaber kept driving the band harder and harder."

Producer Ted Templeman and his assistant Donn Landee were not present at the recording of "Saint Dominic's Preview", but oversaw the overdubs and retakes that were made to the song. The overdubs include Salisbury's organ part, which is cued in by the line ‘Across the street from Cathedral Notre Dame’, and John McFee's pedal steel guitar, intended to give a country feel to the line 'Every Hank Williams railroad train ... '. The electric guitar had to be rerecorded because of unwanted sound leaking into the microphone. Doug Messenger was no longer part of Morrison's band when the overdubs were being recorded, so numerous guitarists, including Ronnie Montrose, were brought in to play it. None produced the sound wanted, so Messenger was recalled, and managed to complete the overdub to Morrison's satisfaction in one take. Morrison also rerecorded his vocals, which, over the new backing, allowed him to react more to the music; "no regrets" was replaced with "ne regrette rien" and the vowel sound of "wine" was elongated to "wi-ee-ine". In the final recording, "ne regrette rien" is replaced by the Latin motto "non regredior" ("I do not retreat").

== Reception ==
Brian Hinton believes the lyrics in "Saint Dominic's Preview" are "the most Dylanesque Van ever gets", while Peter Wrench claims that "Saint Dominic's Preview" "is, by some distance, the densest and most allusive songs on the record and one of the most striking in the Morrison canon."

Rolling Stone reviewer Stephen Holden identified "Saint Dominic's Preview" as the song that unifies the album: "The six-and-a-half-minute title cut which opens side two nicely straddles the gap between the album’s two styles. Instrumentally it is very similar to 'Tupelo Honey'. The arrangement and vocals are joyously full-bodied ... However, the dense verbiage (more complex than on any other cut) is disjunctive and arcane, juxtaposing images of mythic travel, with those of social alienation."

Janet Planet commented about the song: "I am rather partial to 'St Dominic's Preview' if I had to pick one from the album. And I'm proud of our contribution. I really loved singing with him and I loved Ellen [Schroer] and Mark [Springer] – they were wonderful."

== Other releases ==
"Saint Dominic's Preview" was one of the live performances included on Morrison's 1974 acclaimed live album, It's Too Late To Stop Now. It is also one of the songs performed on Morrison's first video Van Morrison in Ireland, recorded in February 1979 and released in 1981. It was Morrison's first concert in Belfast since 1967. The audience notably cheer when Morrison sings the lyric that mentions Belfast city.

Morrison recorded a second studio version of the song for the Irish television program Sult at the Temple Bar, Dublin in April 1996. It was later released in August 1997 on the album Sult: Spirit of the Music with contributions from various Irish performers and groups. Clinton Heylin notes that when this recording was made was "a time when the people of Northern Ireland were again praying for lasting peace ... Sung with a passion rare, the 1996 'Saint Dominic's Preview' reminded everyone watching that the time had come to reinstate these sentiments." Greil Marcus notes that Belfast and San Francisco were very different places in 1972 and 1996. This version begins with Dónal Lunny on bazouki playing in a minor mode, which Marcus believes "could be the beginning of anything." To Marcus, Morrison's voice, which is much lower than it was on the original recording, gives the song a new meaning with "a hint of violence" through his "harsh vowels" and "gruff tone". He believed that the abundance of different parts at the end of the 1972 version "was lost in a mass finale", whereas the fact that all the parts came together in this version, represents the people "marching as one, shouting for freedom, in the moment celebrating the truth that they already had it." This version is included as a bonus track on the deluxe edition of his 1997 album The Healing Game.

The original recording was remastered in 2007 and included on the compilation album, Still on Top - The Greatest Hits.

== Personnel ==
- Van Morrison – guitar, vocals
- Jules Broussard – tenor saxophone
- Bill Church – bass
- Gary Mallaber – drums
- John McFee – steel guitar
- Doug Messenger – guitar
- Pat O'Hara – trombone
- Janet Planet – backing vocals
- Tom Salisbury – piano, organ
- Ellen Schroer – backing vocals
- Jack Schroer – alto and baritone saxophones
- Mark Springer – backing vocals

== Sources ==
- Brooks, Ken (1999), In Search of Van Morrison, Andover, Hampshire: Agenda, ISBN 1-899882-95-2
- Heylin, Clinton (2003). Can You Feel the Silence? Van Morrison: A New Biography, Chicago Review Press, ISBN 1-55652-542-7
- Hinton, Brian (2000). Celtic Crossroads: The Art of Van Morrison, Sanctuary, ISBN 1-86074-169-X
- Marcus, Greil (2010), When That Rough God Goes Riding: Listening to Van Morrison, New York: Public Affairs, ISBN 978-1-58648-821-5
- Mills, Peter (2010), Hymns to the Silence: Inside the Words and Music of Van Morrison, London: Continuum, ISBN 978-0-8264-2976-6
- Rogan, Johnny (2006). Van Morrison: No Surrender, London: Vintage Books ISBN 978-0-09-943183-1
- Wrench, Peter (2012). Saint Dominic's Flashback: Van Morrison's Classic Album, Forty Years On, FeedARead. Kindle Edition. ISBN 9781781768600
