= Vanthology: A Tribute to Van Morrison =

Compilation album by various artists
- Released: August 5, 2003
- Genre: various
- Label: Evidence Music
- Producer: Jon Tiven, Robert "Butch" Johnson

Vanthology: A Tribute to Van Morrison is the third tribute album for the songs of Northern Irish singer-songwriter Van Morrison. It was released in August 2003.

== Track listing ==
All songs by Van Morrison

1. "Tupelo Honey" performed by Little Milton – 4:39
2. "Jackie Wilson Said (I'm in Heaven When You Smile)" performed by Syl Johnson – 2:53
3. "Have I Told You Lately" performed by William Bell – 4:08
4. "Brown Eyed Girl" performed by Freddie Scott – 3:40
5. "Into the Mystic" performed by Frederick Knight – 4:00
6. "Real Real Gone" performed by Bettye LaVette – 4:04
7. "Crazy Love" performed by Eddie Floyd – 2:52
8. "Gloria" performed by Sir Mack Rice – 4:20
9. "Warm Love" performed by Otis Clay – 3:00
10. "Queen of the Slipstream" performed by Son Seals – 3:54
11. "Bright Side of the Road" performed by Dan Penn – 3:44
12. "My Lonely Sad Eyes" performed by Bobby Patterson – 2:48
13. "I Like It Like That" performed by Henry Butler – 4:34
14. "Bulbs" performed by Ellis Hooks – 4:16
15. "Moondance" performed by Chuck Jackson – 4:52

== Personnel ==
- Henry Butler – organ, piano
- Simon Kirke – drums, percussion
- Sally Tiven – bass guitar, backing vocals
- Jon Tiven – electric and acoustic guitars
- Ellis Hooks – backing vocals
- Alan Merrill – backing vocals
- Lauren Singer – backing vocals

=== Additional Musicians ===
- Mason Casey – harmonica on "I Like It Like That", "Moondance", "Gloria" and "Into the Mystic"
- Marvin Floyd – organ on "Brown Eyed Girl"
- Paul Ossola – double bass on "Moondance"
- Little Milton – lead guitar on "Tupelo Honey"
- Son Seals – lead guitar on "Queen of the Slipstream"
- Eddie Floyd – backing vocals on "Crazy Love"
- Dan Penn – harmony vocals on "Bright Side of the Road"

On "Gloria"

- Paul Randolph – bass
- Michael Gibes – drums
- Paul Carey – guitar
- Mason Casey – backing vocals
- Jon Tiven – backing vocals
- Sir Mack Rice – backing vocals
- Shadow Morton – backing vocals

On "I Like It Like That"

- Christa Haskett – backing vocals
- Yuko Ichioka – backing vocals
- Georgina Graper Moore – backing vocals

== Production ==
- Art Direction and Design: Stephen Jensen
- Cover Illustration: Joni Bishop
- Project Coordination: Linda Scoma
- Production: Jon Tiven
- Arrangements: Sally Tiven
- Engineering: Joe Johnson
