= Hard Nose the Highway =

Studio album by Van Morrison
- Released: August 1973
- Recorded: 21–25 August and October 1972 at Caledonia Studio
- Genre: Folk rock, R&B, blue-eyed soul, jazz
- Length: 42:52
- Label: Warner Bros.
- Producer: Van Morrison

Van Morrison chronology
Saint Dominic's Preview (1972)	Hard Nose the Highway (1973)	It's Too Late to Stop Now (1974)

Singles from Hard Nose the Highway
- 1. "Warm Love" b/w "I Will Be There" Released: 25 April 1973; 2. "Bein' Green" b/w "Wild Children" Released: September 1973

Hard Nose the Highway is the seventh studio album by Northern Irish singer-songwriter Van Morrison, released in 1973. It was his first solo album since his 1967 debut Blowin' Your Mind! to contain songs not written by Morrison. A cover version of the song "Bein' Green", usually associated with Kermit the Frog, is included, as is a take of the traditional song "Purple Heather". The album also contains the single "Warm Love," a fan favourite.

== Recording ==
Recorded during a series of prolific recording sessions, there was more than enough material to fill a double-album. Morrison proposed the idea to Warner Bros. Records, but he was ultimately convinced to release a single LP. During the recording sessions held between August and November 1972, there were nearly thirty songs recorded in all, at least three-quarters of them original compositions. A few leftover tracks were saved or re-recorded for future albums like Veedon Fleece, but most would not see release until 1998's compilation of outtakes, The Philosopher's Stone, when nine of the songs would be used. Biographer Clinton Heylin suggested that "only 'Warm Love' and 'Hard Nose the Highway' could have sat comfortably alongside 'rejects' like 'Madame Joy', 'Bulbs', 'Spare Me a Little', 'Country Fair', 'Contemplation Rose' and 'Drumshanbo Hustle'."

By Morrison's own account, this was the first album that was completely produced under his control. The recording sessions even took place in a recording studio he had built next door to his home in Fairfax, California. He remarked on the album: "As a concept for the album, I was just trying to establish how hard it was to do what I do. Plus there were some lighter things on the other side of it. One side has a kind of hard feeling while the other is soft."

== Composition ==
"Snow in San Anselmo" is the opening song and features the backing vocals of the Oakland Symphony Chamber Chorus. Morrison says the song is, "just a sketch on when it snowed in San Anselmo. It's about the images that were happening when it was snowing there for the first time in thirty years."

"Warm Love" was released as a successful single and was also a favorite concert performance in the 70s. It featured the catchy line, "and it's ever present everywhere, Warm Love."

The title song, "Hard Nose the Highway" is explained by Morrison as: "the theme running through the whole song is 'Seen some hard times' which I have 'Drawn some fine lines' which I definitely have, and 'No time for shoe shines' when you're trying to make a living."

"Wild Children" is actually about the post-war children growing up in other countries and getting their images—from American anti-heroes such as those portrayed by James Dean, Marlon Brando, Rod Steiger and playwright Tennessee Williams.

"The Great Deception" is according to biographer, Richie Yorke: "One of the most stinging indictments from any observer, let alone a rock artist, of the tragic hypocrisy of so many participants in the sub-culture, in particular the big-time rock stars of this era."

"Being Green" is the first non-original composition Morrison had included on any album for Warner Bros. He says about his interpretation of the song, "That was just a statement that you don't have to be flamboyant. If somebody doesn't like you just because you're a certain thing, then maybe they're seeing the wrong thing."

A reviewer said about the ten and a half-minute "Autumn Song": "I can't deny that it's the funkiest song about the splendors and moods of fall that has ever glided through my ears."

The ending song, "Purple Heather" is the traditional "Wild Mountain Thyme" written by F. McPeake as a variant of Robert Tannahill's "The Braes of Balquhidder", and re-arranged by Morrison.

== Reception ==
Professional ratings
Review scores
Source	Rating
Allmusic	3.5/5 stars
Christgau's Record Guide	B−
Uncut	1/5 stars
The Village Voice	C+

According to Ritchie Yorke, who published his biography, Into the Music, in 1975, the album enjoyed rave reviews at the time of release. He cited one dissenting critic Charlie Gillett, who wrote in Let It Rock: "The trouble with Hard Nose the Highway is that although the music is quite often interesting, it doesn't have a convincing emotional basis...Despite the lack of inspiration and of melodic focus, the record is attractive to listen to. But Van Morrison has set high standards for himself and Hard Nose the Highway doesn't live up to them."

Robert Christgau rated it only a B− and mostly dismissed it with: "The relaxed rhythms are just lax most of the time, the vocal surprises mild after Saint Dominic's Preview, the lyrics dumbest when they're more than mood pieces, and the song construction offhand except on 'Warm Love'."

Stephen Holden in his 1973 Rolling Stone review said: "Hard Nose the Highway is psychologically complex, musically somewhat uneven and lyrically excellent. Its surface pleasures are a little less than those of St. Dominic's Preview and a great deal less than those of Tupelo Honey, while its lyric depths are richer and more accessible than those of either predecessor. The major theme of Hard Nose is nostalgia, briefly but firmly counter-pointed by disillusion."

Later assessments in The Rolling Stone Record Guide (1979) and The Rolling Stone Album Guide (1992) were less generous. In the former, Hard Nose was listed as Morrison's only one-star album to date; reviewer Dave Marsh called it "a failed sidestep, a compromise between the visionary demands of Morrison's work and his desire for a broad-based audience." In the later edition, Paul Evans called the record the "vaguest and weakest" of Morrison's 1970s output.

In the opinion of biographer Erik Hage, "Hard Nose the Highway seems to have suffered a lot of unnecessary criticism—many commentators consider it his worst and most uninspired album—perhaps because it followed such a remarkable run of LPs, and because two truly forward-thinking albums had come before and after it (1972's Saint Dominic's Preview and 1974's Veedon Fleece)."

== Track listing ==
All songs written by Van Morrison, unless otherwise noted.

Side one
No.	Title	Length
1.	"Snow In San Anselmo"	4:34
2.	"Warm Love"	3:22
3.	"Hard Nose The Highway"	5:12
4.	"Wild Children"	4:20
5.	"The Great Deception"	4:51

Side two
No.	Title	Writer(s)	Length
6.	"Bein' Green"	Joe Raposo	4:20
7.	"Autumn Song"		10:37
8.	"Purple Heather"	Traditional	5:42

== Personnel ==
- Van Morrison – acoustic guitar, vocals
- Jack Schroer – tenor, alto, baritone and soprano saxophones
- Jules Broussard – tenor saxophone, flute
- Joseph Ellis – trumpet on "Hard Nose the Highway" and "Bein' Green"
- Bill Atwood – trumpet
- Nathan Rubin – violin
- Zaven Melikian – violin
- Nancy Ellis – viola
- Theresa "Terry" Adams – cello
- John Tenney – violin
- Michael Gerling – violin
- Jef Labes – piano
- John Platania – guitar
- David Hayes – bass
- Gary Mallaber – vibraphone, drums
- Rick Shlosser – drums
- Marty David – bass "Green" and "Wild Children"
- Jackie DeShannon – backing vocals on "Warm Love" and "Hard Nose the Highway"
- Oakland Symphony Chamber Chorus on "Snow in San Anselmo"
- SPIRIT, MORALE AND LAUGHTER – Ed Fletcher (alias Iversen)

=== Production ===
- Producer: Van Morrison
- Engineers: Neil Schwartz, Jim Stern
- Arrangers: Van Morrison, Jef Labes (strings), Jack Schroer, (horns)
- Album Cover Art: Rob Springett

== Charts ==
Chart (1974)	Peak position
Australia (Kent Music Report)	42
US Billboard Top LPs	27
UK Albums Chart	22
