= Wonderful Remark =

Song by Van Morrison

from the album The King of Comedy Soundtrack
- Released: 1983
- Length: 3:58 / 8:00 (The Philosopher's Stone version)
- Label: Warner Bros.
- Songwriter: Van Morrison
- Producer: Robbie Robertson

"Wonderful Remark" is a song written by Northern Irish singer-songwriter Van Morrison and first released on the soundtrack album for the 1983 film The King of Comedy. This recording later appeared on the benefit compilation Nobody's Child: Romanian Angel Appeal and on several compilations of Morrison's works. At least two earlier recordings exist, one of which appeared on Morrison's 1998 album The Philosopher's Stone, a collection of previously unreleased tracks.

The melody is based on an earlier Morrison composition, "Joe Harper Saturday Morning" (recorded for the Bang label in 1967).

== Recording and composition ==
Morrison stated in an interview that "Wonderful Remark" was about a difficult period financially that he had spent living in New York: "It was about people who were supposed to be helping you and they weren't there. It was about the business I'm in and the world in general. A lot of the times you can't count on anybody."

The song was originally recorded in August 1969 at one of the Moondance studio sessions at Century Sound Studios in New York City, but this version of the song remains unreleased.

The original release (running 3:58) first appeared on the soundtrack to the film The King of Comedy, and in 1990 was featured on The Best of Van Morrison and the benefit album Nobody's Child: Romanian Angel Appeal. In 2007 it appeared on two compilation albums: Still on Top - The Greatest Hits and Van Morrison at the Movies - Soundtrack Hits.

The eight-minute version that was released on the 1998 compilation album, The Philosopher's Stone, was derived from one of the Saint Dominic's Preview recording sessions around early 1972 that took place at Wally Heider Studios and Pacific High Studios in San Francisco and at the Church in San Anselmo.

== Legacy ==
On 14 February 1994 when Van Morrison was awarded the BRIT Award for his outstanding contribution to British music, Beirut hostage John McCarthy testified to the importance of "Wonderful Remark" which he called "a song written more than 20 years ago that was very important to us." McCarthy and Jill Morrell had written a book together in 1993, after McCarthy's release, using the lyric "some other rainbow" from "Wonderful Remark" for the book's title.

Clinging to some other rainbow
While we're standing, waiting in the cold
Telling us the same old story
Knowing time is growing old.

== Personnel on original release ==
- Van Morrison – vocals, acoustic guitar
- Robbie Robertson – electric guitar
- David Hayes – bass
- Richard Tee – piano
- Jim Keltner – drums
- Nicky Hopkins – organ, synthesizer

== Personnel on The Philosopher's Stone ==
- Van Morrison – vocals, acoustic guitar
- Lee Charlton – drums
- Bill Church – bass
- "Boots" Rolf Houston – flute
- Ronnie Montrose – acoustic guitar, backing vocals
