= Jimmy White (singer) =

- Born: James Albert White; August 28, 1955 (age 70); Paterson, New Jersey, United States
- Origin: Totowa, New Jersey, United States
- Genres: Adult contemporary, pop, Christian music
- Occupation: Singer · songwriter · producer
- Instrument: Vocals · piano
- Years active: 1978–present
- Website: www.jimmywhitemusiccomplete.com

Jimmy White is an American singer-songwriter and record producer.

== Background ==
White has released five studio albums, which have earned him five New Music Awards, seven Independent Music Awards and one National Radio award.

== Music ==
In 2009, White won the "Crossover Artist of the Year" award at the New Music Awards. He won a second award for "Best Male Artist" at the IMN Independent Music Awards in Los Angeles, California.

In 2010, White won an award for "Best AC Group/Duo" with Jonell Mosser.

In early 2011, White released a single he wrote entitled "Forever and a Day". Its music video won Best Video at the Independent Music Awards.

In the spring of 2015, his song "Change My Life" was chosen for and included in the worldwide release of the French-Canadian film Aurelie Laflamme's Diary.

== Discography ==
=== Studio albums ===
Title	Album details
One Track Heart	Release date: 1993; Label: Washington Place
Hidden Pictures	Release date: 2004; Re-released: 2007; Label: Washington Place
Two Cities	Release date: November 2, 2011; Label: 828 Records
My Mom Joined the Circus	Release date: January 1, 2014; Label: 828 Records

=== Singles ===
Title	Year	Album	Peak chart positions		
Title	Year	Album	Adult Contemporary	AC 40	US Indie
"My My Maria"	1993	One Track Heart	3	2	1
"One Track Heart"	2006	One Track Heart	1	1	1
Change My Life	2006	One Track Heart	1	1	1
"Sure Feels Like Love"	2007	Hidden Pictures	1	1	1
"Someone I Used To Know"	2008	Hidden Pictures			
"MLG"	2008	NA	1	1	1
"I Wish You Peace"	2008	Two Cities	1	1	1
"So Far Behind"	2009	Two Cities	5	2	1
"Just What I Need"	2010	Two Cities	1	1	1
"Hard Ride"	2011	Two Cities	2	1	1
"Forever And A Day"	2011	Two Cities	1	1	1
"Warm"	2012	Two Cities	2	1	1
"Michaela"	2016	My Mom Joined the Circus	1	1	1
"Miserable Man"	2017	My Mom Joined the Circus	5	8	2
"No Goodbyes"	2017	NA	5	5	1
"—" denotes releases that did not chart

=== Music videos ===
Year	Title	Director
2008	"I Wish You Peace"	Lark Watts
2008	"Angel Eyes (A Wedding Song)"	Lark Watts
2009	"So Far Behind"	Joel Pfeiffer
2010	"Katy Did"	Joel Pfeiffer
2011	"Forever and a Day"	Joel Pfeiffer
2011	"Good Friends are Hard to Find"	Joel Pfeiffrr
2016	"Miserable Man"	Joel Pfeiffer
2019	"Goddess"	Joel Pfeiffer
2022	"Ghost of a Chance"	Joel Pfeiffer
