= Gypsy (Van Morrison song) =

1972 single by Van Morrison

- German single cover

Single by Van Morrison

from the album Saint Dominic's Preview
- B-side: "Saint Dominic's Preview"
- Released: December 1972
- Genre: Folk rock; R&B
- Length: 3:10
- Label: Warner Bros.
- Songwriter: Van Morrison
- Producers: Ted Templeman; Van Morrison

Van Morrison singles chronology
"Redwood Tree" (1972)	"Gypsy" (1972)	"Warm Love" (1973)

"Gypsy" is a song written by Van Morrison that was first released on his 1972 album Saint Dominic's Preview. It was also released as a single.

== Lyrics and music ==
The theme of "Gypsy" is a familiar one to Morrison. As with "Caravan" and other songs, the song extols the archetype of the wandering gypsy who has the freedom to move around but on the other hand lacks a secure place to settle down. Music critic Steve Sparacio said that it "conjures visions of a caravan with camping camp-fires bright and dancers dancing."

"Gypsy" uses a ballad form. The music has a Middle Eastern feel. The rhythm alternates between double-time and triple time. Rolling Stone Magazine critic Stephen Holden describes these rhythms as "driving and excited" and describes the guitar textures as "exotic." The instrumentation also includes saxophone and piano. Irish Times critic Stewart Parker suggested that the chord progressions of "Gypsy" resemble those of "The House of the Rising Sun."

== Reception ==
Santa Fe New Mexican critic Anne Hillerman considered "Gypsy" to be "better than anything [Morrison had] written before." According to Holden, "Gypsy" "demonstrates that Van is precisely a musical gypsy — cryptic, sensual, and shrewd — a master at casting spells and at leading us through whatever territory he feels like exploring." Music critic Johnny Rogan stated that "Gypsy" is a "reasonable attempt to recapture the excellence of 'Caravan.'" Billboard said of the song that "dark tonal texture combines with an infectious, hard -driving beat, for an eerie anthem to the joys of mobile living." Record World said that "this superb singer- songwriter delivers in powerful style a r&b influenced tune that is sassy & sinuous." Music critic Dink Lorance praised Morrison's vocal performance as well as the saxophone playing. Austin American critic Joe Gracey says that the "lye lye lye" refrain could have made the song trite, but since "Gypsy" is unpretentious it is not disappointing.

The single just missed the Billboard Hot 100, topping the Bubbling Under the Hot 100 chart at #101.
