= Foggy Lyttle =

- Born: David Lyttle; 13 May 1944; Belfast, Northern Ireland
- Died: 25 December 2003 (aged 59)
- Occupation: Musician
- Instruments: Guitar

David 'Foggy' Lyttle (13 May 1944, in Belfast, Northern Ireland – 25 December 2003), was a guitarist, best known for his work with Van Morrison. Morrison's 2005 album Magic Time was dedicated to him, as he had died within weeks of completion of the recording. The album credits described him as "a respected colleague and fine performer who brought a unique flavour to many of [the album's] tracks."

Some of the many artists Lyttle has played with include Sinéad O'Connor, Brian Kennedy, The Chieftains, Marianne Faithfull, Liam Neeson, Harry Nilsson, Phil Everly, Gene Pitney, Acker Bilk, Chris Youlden and Elton John.
