= I Will Be There (Van Morrison song) =

Song by Van Morrison

from the album Saint Dominic's Preview
- Released: July 1972
- Recorded: April 1972
- Genre: Jazz; R&B; pop
- Length: 3:01
- Label: Warner Bros.
- Songwriter(s): Van Morrison
- Producer(s): Ted Templeman, Van Morrison

Saint Dominic's Preview track listing
- 7 tracks: 1. "Jackie Wilson Said (I'm in Heaven When You Smile)"; 2. "Gypsy"; 3. "I Will Be There"; 4. "Listen to the Lion"; 5. "Saint Dominic's Preview"; 6. "Redwood Tree"; 7. "Almost Independence Day"

"I Will Be There" is a song featured on Northern Irish singer/songwriter Van Morrison's sixth album Saint Dominic's Preview (1972). The song is also the B-side to Morrison's single "Warm Love", released in 1973.

== Recording and composition ==
"I Will Be There" was recorded in April 1972 at the Wally Heider Studios in San Francisco, along with "Saint Dominic's Preview" and "Redwood Tree". It is one of few overtly jazz songs written by Morrison, and the first since the release of "Moondance" in 1970. The song is led in by Tom Salisbury on piano, who also arranged the three songs from the session. Salisbury explained his contribution to the song:"I wrote the horn chart." "It was written with simple triads as the chords. We ran over that one ahead of the session and Doug Messenger expanded the progression by using four- and five-part jazz chords: G7(9), F(9,6,flat5), E7#9, etc." Also featured in the song is a saxophone solo from long serving Jack Schroer. The other members of the band used for the session were Doug Messenger on guitar, Bill Church on bass, Gary Mallaber on drums and Jules Broussard on saxophone.

== Writing ==
The lyrics are the most lighthearted of the songs on Saint Dominic's Preview, with the singer grabbing his razor, suitcase, toothbrush, overcoat and underwear, sung in quick succession in a break in the music. Peter Wrench notes that "The words tumble over themselves in a joyful jumble: they shouldn’t quite fit the beat but they do." Wrench believes that it is not a song that Morrison refined lyrically, citing the line "Try not to be through the mill" as an example.

== Reception ==
John Collis says, "A hero (of Van), is evoked by the piano-led blues "I Will Be There" - the spirit of Ray Charles looms large in the song." The Rolling Stone review of Saint Dominic's Preview remarks: "'I Will Be There' goes the furthest of any (of the songs in Saint Dominic's Preview) into R&B-jazz roots, as Van pays expert musical tribute to Count Basie and Joe Williams."

== Live performances ==
The first known performance of "I Will Be There", which is likely to be the first time the song was performed, was on April 27, 1972.

It was one of the live performances recorded and included on Morrison's 1996 live album, How Long Has This Been Going On. A live performance of "I Will Be There", recorded in 1989, is featured on the video album, Van Morrison The Concert, released in 1990.

== Personnel ==
- Van Morrison: vocals
- Jules Broussard: tenor saxophone
- Bill Church: bass
- Gary Mallaber: drums
- Doug Messenger: guitar
- Tom Salisbury: piano
- Jack Schroer: alto saxophone

== Covers ==
- Colin James on Colin James & The Little Big Band 3
- Pee Wee Ellis with Van Morrison
