= Redwood Tree (song) =

Single by Van Morrison

from the album Saint Dominic's Preview
- B-side: "Saint Dominic's Preview"
- Released: October 1972
- Recorded: April 1972
- Studio: Wally Heider Studios
- Genre: Folk rock; R&B
- Length: 3:03
- Label: Warner Bros.
- Songwriter(s): Van Morrison
- Producer(s): Van Morrison

Van Morrison singles chronology
"Jackie Wilson Said (I'm in Heaven When You Smile)" (1972)	"Redwood Tree" (1972)	"Gypsy" (1973)

"Redwood Tree" is the sixth song on Northern Irish singer-songwriter Van Morrison's 1972 album, Saint Dominic's Preview, released in July 1972 by Warner Bros. It was later released in October as the second of three singles from the album and charted at number 98 on the US Billboard Hot 100.

== Recording ==
"Redwood Tree" was recorded in April 1972 at the Wally Heider Studios in San Francisco, along with "Saint Dominic's Preview" and "I Will Be There". Salisbury arranged all three songs for the album, as he had absolute pitch, which allowed him to write down the music over phone calls with Morrison with ease.

== Writing ==
In April 1971 Morrison and his family moved to Marin County, California, before he recorded his previous album, Tupelo Honey. Their new home was on the side of a hill in rural countryside close to San Francisco, with redwood trees nearby. Biographer Johnny Rogan believes the song "Redwood Tree" "enshrined the beauty of Marin county".

The song evokes nostalgia and memories of growing up, in a similar way to his songs "And It Stoned Me", "Country Fair" and "Take Me Back". The difference with "Redwood Tree" is that it is not set in Belfast or Northern Ireland, where Morrison grew up, as Brian Hinton remarks:

"Redwood Tree" is a song of reconciliation, which seems to graft Van's Belfast childhood onto California, where redwoods actually grow, "Keep us from all harm", an invocation to the spirit of the ancient wood.

== Reception ==
When released as a single it was not as successful as Rolling Stone reviewer Steven Holden had anticipated: "The affirmation of Saint Dominic's Preview is translated to the past in 'Redwood Tree', an ecstatic boyhood reminiscence centering on the image of a sheltering redwood tree. This beautiful, sensuous cut has the album's greatest potential as a hit single." It was released as a single but only charted at number 98 on the Billboard Hot 100, which made it less of a success than the album's lead single "Jackie Wilson Said (I'm in Heaven When You Smile)", which reached number 61.

Billboard recommended the single and called it a "strong folk rock ballad." Record World said that the "Nice self-production and steady stream of melody combine to make this an easy-programming example of singer-songwriter's art."

John Collis describes the song as "A charming if somewhat folksy reminder of Morrison's interest in country music at the time."

== Personnel ==
- Van Morrison – vocals, rhythm guitar
- Jules Broussard – tenor saxophone
- Bill Church – bass
- Gary Mallaber – drums
- Doug Messenger – guitar
- Janet Planet – backing vocals
- Tom Salisbury – piano
- Ellen Schroer – backing vocals
- Jack Schroer – alto and baritone saxophones
- Mark Springer – backing vocals
