= How Long Has This Been Going On (Van Morrison album) =

Studio album by Van Morrison
- Released: December 1995
- Recorded: 3 May 1995
- Venue: Ronnie Scott's, London
- Genre: Jazz; bebop
- Length: 50:49
- Label: Verve
- Producer: Van Morrison, Georgie Fame

Van Morrison chronology
| Days Like This (1995) | How Long Has This Been Going On (1995) | Tell Me Something: The Songs of Mose Allison (1996) |

Singles from How Long Has This Been Going On
- 1. "That's Life" b/w "Moondance"/"That's Life" Released: February 1996

How Long Has This Been Going On is the twenty-fourth studio album by Northern Irish singer-songwriter Van Morrison, "with Georgie Fame and Friends", released in December 1995 in the UK. It charted at No. 1 on US Top Jazz Albums chart.

== Recording history ==
The album was recorded live (but without an audience) at Ronnie Scott's Jazz Club, London, England, on 3 May 1995, and features a number of jazz standards and a be-bop influenced rendition of Morrison's classic "Moondance". According to Van Morrison, "the album took four or five hours to record and Ronnie Scott's was chosen for the vibe." Georgie Fame recalled that the album came about after he and Morrison had discussed it for several years when, "I got the band together, and we ran through some ideas one quiet afternoon...that went very well, so Van said, 'Let's do it.'"

== Songs ==
Pee Wee Ellis played saxophone and also served as arranger, along with Fame, Morrison and saxophonist Leo Green. There were more cover songs on this album than usual with Morrison's albums. Annie Ross appeared on "Blues Backstage" and also on the song, "Centerpiece". This song is also featured on the 2007 compilation album, The Best of Van Morrison Volume 3, along with "Moondance" and "That's Life". "Heathrow Shuffle" is an instrumental composition from the 70's that was brought back on this album. Morrison had performed this song when he played at the Montreux Jazz Festival in 1974, and it is included on his 2006 DVD, Live at Montreux 1980/1974.

== Reviews ==
Professional ratings
Review scores
| Source | Rating |
|---|---|
| AllMusic | 3.5/5 stars |
| Entertainment Weekly | B |
| Rolling Stone | 4/5 stars |

The reviews for the album were mixed with the American critics more favourable. The Daily Telegraph said, "Van huffs and puffs where he should whisper," while Rolling Stone stated, "It's an old blues trick – laughing in the face of trouble – but Morrison does it with such contagious enthusiasm, it sounds fresh again."

== Track listing ==
1. "I Will Be There" (Van Morrison) – 2:30
2. "The New Symphony Sid" (King Pleasure, Lester Young: additional lyrics Georgie Fame) – 3:53
3. "Early in the Morning" (Dallas Bartley, Leo Hickman, Louis Jordan) – 2:44
4. "Who Can I Turn To (When Nobody Needs Me)" (Leslie Bricusse, Anthony Newley) – 4:02
5. "Sack O' Woe" (Cannonball Adderley, Jon Hendricks) – 4:06
6. "Moondance" (Morrison) – 7:18
7. "Centerpiece" (Harry Edison, Hendricks), including section from "Blues Backstage" (Frank Foster) – 4:08
8. "How Long Has This Been Going On?" (George Gershwin, Ira Gershwin) – 3:49
9. "Your Mind Is on Vacation" (Mose Allison) – 3:06
10. "All Saint's Day" (Morrison) – 2:19
11. "Blues in the Night" (Harold Arlen, Johnny Mercer) – 3:22
12. "Don't Worry About a Thing" (Allison) – 2:22
13. "That's Life" (Dean Kay, Kelly Gordon) – 3:52
14. "Heathrow Shuffle" (Morrison) – 3:18
- Tracks 2, 5, 7, 8, 10 & 12 arranged by Georgie Fame.
- Tracks 3, 4, 9 & 13 arranged by Pee Wee Ellis.
- Tracks 6 & 14 arranged by Van Morrison.
- Track 1 arranged by Leo Green.
- Track 11 arranged by Georgie Fame and Pee Wee Ellis.

== Personnel ==
- Van Morrison – vocals, alto saxophone
- Georgie Fame – vocals, Hammond organ
- Annie Ross – vocals
- Pee Wee Ellis – alto saxophone
- Alan Skidmore – alto saxophone
- Leo Green – tenor saxophone
- Guy Barker – trumpet
- Robin Aspland – piano
- Alec Dankworth – double bass
- Ralph Salmins – drums

== Charts ==
Chart performance for How Long Has This Been Going On
| Chart (1995–1996) | Peak position |
|---|---|
| Australian Albums (ARIA) | 100 |
| Dutch Albums (Album Top 100) | 81 |
| German Albums (Offizielle Top 100) | 83 |
| Swedish Albums (Sverigetopplistan) | 47 |
| UK Albums (OCC) | 76 |
| US Billboard 200 | 55 |
| US Top Jazz Albums | 1 |
