= The Philosopher's Stone (album) =

Compilation album by Van Morrison
- Released: 16 June 1998
- Recorded: 1969–1988
- Genres: Blues, R&B, folk rock, jazz-funk
- Length: 153:07
- Label: Polydor
- Producer: Van Morrison

Van Morrison chronology
The Healing Game (1997)	The Philosopher's Stone (1998)	Back on Top (1999)

Professional ratings
Review scores
Source	Rating
Allmusic	3.5/5 stars
Entertainment Weekly	A−
Rolling Stone	3.5/5 stars

The Philosopher's Stone is a compilation album by Northern Irish singer-songwriter Van Morrison released in 1998.

The songs released on this 2-CD thirty-track album were previously unreleased outtakes from 1969 to 1988. The album features twenty-five songs that had never been released, and early alternative renditions of "The Street Only Knew Your Name" from Inarticulate Speech of the Heart, "Wonderful Remark" from The Best of Van Morrison, "Real Real Gone" from Enlightenment, "Joyous Sound" and "Flamingos Fly" from A Period of Transition, and "Bright Side of the Road" from Into the Music.

Three songs on the album were evidently intended for Morrison's unreleased 1975 album Mechanical Bliss. "Twilight Zone", "Foggy Mountain Top" and "Flamingos Fly" were all mixed in 1974 just before Mechanical Bliss was due to come out.

== Original release ==
The Philosopher's Stone, Volume One was originally scheduled to be released in July 1996. When it was released, some of the tracks had been changed; "When I Deliver", "John Brown's Body" and "I'm Ready" were replaced by "The Street Only Knew Your Name", "Western Plains" and "Joyous Sound". "John Brown's Body" and "I'm Ready" were eventually released as B-sides on Morrison's 1999 single "Back on Top".

Commenting on the previously unreleased songs, Van Morrison remarked:

"It's hard to work out why you didn't put something out at the time. Usually it felt like it didn't fit...When I was with Warner Brothers they were very minimalist."

The Van Morrison song titled "Philosopher's Stone" does not appear on this album, but is from 1999's Back On Top, released one year after this album.

== Recording dates ==
Many of the recording dates on the album notes are disputed by one of Morrison's biographers, Heylin. "Really Don't Know" he claims was recorded in 1969, not 1971 as he only has details of the musicians recording with Morrison in 1969. Heylin feels that tracks from "Wonderful Remark" to "Drumshanbo Hustle" were recorded in 1972 not 1973, and that "There There Child" was recorded in 1972 not 1976. On disc two "John Henry" is shown as recorded in 1977, but Heylin argues that it was recorded two years earlier, as there are no details on Morrison recording in 1977. "Crazy Jane on God" was recorded with Moving Hearts in 1983 for the album A Sense of Wonder. From the same sessions the songs "A Sense of Wonder" and "Boffyflow and Spike" were used for the album. The recording date of these songs was 1983 (as stated on the album itself) but the date on The Philosopher's Stone states "Crazy Jane on God" was recorded in 1984.

Scott Thomas in the fan magazine Wavelength noted:

Everything about The Philosopher's Stone, from its format to its packaging to its song selection, seems designed to divorce the tracks from their historical milieu...When we open the package, there are no essays, no interviews, no archival photos — just lyrics (often incorrectly transcribed) and credits which include the year of the session.

== Track listing ==
All songs written by Van Morrison unless noted.

Disc one

1. "Really Don't Know" – 3:37
2. "Ordinary People" – 5:20
3. "Wonderful Remark" – 8:01
4. "Not Supposed to Break Down" – 5:24
5. "Laughing in the Wind" – 4:10
6. "Madame Joy" – 4:23
7. "Contemplation Rose" – 5:15
8. "Don't Worry About Tomorrow" – 5:20
9. "Try for Sleep" (Morrison, John Platania) – 6:05
10. "Lover's Prayer" – 3:57
11. "Drumshanbo Hustle" – 4:48
12. "Twilight Zone" – 8:23
13. "Foggy Mountain Top" – 5:27
14. "Naked in the Jungle" – 4:36
15. "There There Child" (Morrison, Platania) – 3:01

Disc two

1. "The Street Only Knew Your Name" – 6:25
2. "John Henry" (Traditional) – 5:48
3. "Western Plain" (Lead Belly, John Lomax) – 5:42
4. "Joyous Sound" – 2:30
5. "I Have Finally Come to Realize" – 5:09
6. "Flamingoes Fly" – 6:28
7. "Stepping Out Queen Part 2" – 4:26
8. "Bright Side of the Road" – 4:02
9. "Street Theory" – 4:54
10. "Real Real Gone" – 3:45
11. "Showbusiness" – 9:21
12. "For Mr. Thomas" (Robin Williamson) – 4:15
13. "Crazy Jane on God" (William Mathieu, William Butler Yeats) – 4:05
14. "Song of Being a Child" (Peter Handke, Morrison) – 4:09
15. "High Spirits" (Paddy Moloney, Morrison) – 4:21 (recorded with The Chieftains)

== Personnel ==
- Van Morrison – vocals, acoustic and electric guitar, harmonica, saxophone
- June Boyce – vocals
- Ronnie Montrose – guitar, background vocals on "Wonderful Remark" and "Ordinary People"
- John Blakey, John Platania, Mick Cox, Chris Michie – guitar
- Herbie Armstrong – rhythm guitar
- Toni Marcus – violin
- Jules Broussard – flute, tenor saxophone
- "Boots" Rolf Houston – flute
- Jack Schroer – alto and baritone saxophones
- Collin Tilton, Pee Wee Ellis – tenor saxophone
- Bill Atwood – trumpet
- Mark Isham – trumpet, flugelhorn, synthesizers
- John Allair – piano, organ
- Jeff Labes, Mark Naftalin, Mark T. Jordan, Pete Wingfield – piano
- Smith Dobson – piano, electric piano
- Bernie Krause – moog synthesizer
- John Klingberg, Bill Church, David Hayes, Jerome Rimson, Clive Culbertson – bass
- Gary Mallaber, Connie Kay, Lee Charlton, Dahaud Shaar, Rick Shlosser, Peter Van Hooke, Tony Day, Tom Donlinger, Roy Jones, Dave Early – drums
- Jackie DeShannon, Judy Clay, Bianca Thornton, Pauline Lazano, Annie Stocking – background vocals
- Neil Drinkwater – keyboards
- The Chieftains, Moving Hearts – bands

== Charts ==
Chart (1998)	Peak position
UK Albums Chart	20
US Billboard 200	87

== Sources ==
- Heylin, Clinton (2003). Can You Feel the Silence? Van Morrison: A New Biography, Chicago Review Press ISBN 1-55652-542-7
- Rogan, Johnny (2006). Van Morrison: No Surrender, London:Vintage Books ISBN 978-0-09-943183-1
