= Hymns to the Silence (book) =

2010 book

- Author: Peter Mills
- Publisher: Continuum Publishing Corporation
- Publication date: 1 April 2010
- Pages: 448
- ISBN: 978-0826429766

Hymns to the Silence: Inside the Words and Music of Van Morrison is a book published via Continuum Books in June 2010, written by English academic Peter Mills. The book is the first full-length study of Van Morrison's work which does not claim to be a biography. Mills focusses completely on the music, and also casts light on parts of Morrison's songbook that are usually skipped over in career-overviews and synopses.

He concentrates especially on a number of case studies of key albums, particularly on Veedon Fleece, Into the Music and Common One. The book contains interviews with several artists including Ben Sidran, Kevin Rowland (of Dexys Midnight Runners), Folk singer Kate Rusby and Maria McKee. Like Ben Sidran, Mills is a musician as well as a writer so the book offers insight from inside the music as well as in-depth scrutiny of records and shows. The book covers Morrison's musical debt to America, his 'Irishness', his approach to live work, analyses of studio recordings from Them right through to the present day and a whole chapter devoted to a study of Morrison as a singer and a musician.
