= Saint Dominic's Preview =

Studio album by Van Morrison
- Released: July 1972
- Recorded: 1971–1972
- Studios: Columbia (San Francisco); Wally Heider (San Francisco); Pacific High (San Francisco)
- Genres: Folk rock; R&B; soul
- Length: 41:12
- Label: Warner Bros.
- Producers: Ted Templeman; Van Morrison

Van Morrison chronology
Tupelo Honey (1971)	Saint Dominic's Preview (1972)	Hard Nose the Highway (1973)

Singles from Saint Dominic's Preview
- 1. "Jackie Wilson Said (I'm in Heaven When You Smile)" b/w "You've Got the Power" Released: 14 July 1972; 2. "Redwood Tree" b/w "Saint Dominic's Preview" Released: 20 September 1972; 3. "Gypsy" b/w "Saint Dominic's Preview" Released: January 1973

Saint Dominic's Preview is the sixth studio album by Northern Irish singer-songwriter Van Morrison. It was released in July 1972 by Warner Bros. Records. Rolling Stone declared it "the best-produced, most ambitious Van Morrison record yet released."

The diversity of the material on the album highlighted Morrison's fusing of Celtic folk, R&B, blues, jazz and the singer-songwriter genre. "Jackie Wilson Said (I'm in Heaven When You Smile)" and the title track were blends of soul and folk, while lesser known tracks such as "Gypsy" and "Redwood Tree" continued to display a lyrical celebration of nature's beauty. Also on the album were two lengthy tracks, "Listen to the Lion" and the closing "Almost Independence Day" which were given primal, cathartic and intense vocal performances from Morrison. These tracks were similar to the songs on his 1968 album, Astral Weeks.

The album reached number 15 on the Billboard 200 when it was released. This would remain Morrison's highest-charting album on the Billboard 200 until 2008 when Keep It Simple came in at number 10.

== Recording ==
The recording sessions for Saint Dominic's Preview ran between the third quarter of 1971 and the second quarter of 1972 at the Pacific High and Wally Heider Studios in San Francisco. "Listen to the Lion" was left over from the Tupelo Honey sessions, that took place in the summer of 1971 at Columbia Studios in San Francisco. Morrison co-produced the album with Ted Templeman, while some of the musicians who played on it were newly recruited. Morrison's band was constantly changing at the time of recording; members were sometimes unavailable, replaced or fired in between sessions.

"Listen to the Lion" was meant to be included on Tupelo Honey, but got replaced by "You're My Woman", the final track recorded during the session. There were two takes that were recorded; Gary Mallaber played drums on the first and Connie Kay on the second. Mallaber contributed vibraphone to the second take instead, as he remembered: "I did one and Connie did the other. They used the one with the live vibes, which is what I played live." The other musicians on the recording were pianist Mark Jordan, guitarist Ronnie Montrose and bassist Bill Church. Morrison and "Boots" Houston provided backing vocal overdubs.

"Almost Independence Day" was recorded at the first session at the Pacific High Studios in autumn 1971. Morrison had used the studio recently to record a concert in front of a small audience that was broadcast over radio on 5 September. It is the only song on the album to feature guitarist Ron Elliott, double bassist Leroy Vinnegar and Bernie Krause. Mark Naftalin, who plays piano and Moog synthesizer on the song, became a part of Morrison's band and played in subsequent recording sessions. Krause's high synthesizer part was overdubbed afterwards.

On 29 January 1972, Morrison returned to the Pacific High Studios to record "Jackie Wilson Said (I'm in Heaven When You Smile)" and "Gypsy". This time Morrison used his touring band, which included Church, Naftalin, guitarist Doug Messenger, drummer Rick Shlosser and saxophonist Jack Schroer, with overdubs added by Schroer and "Boots" Houston on "Jackie Wilson Said", and trombonist Pat O'Hara and saxophonist Jules Broussard on "Gypsy". The band did not have much time to rehearse "Jackie Wilson Said" and the parts were rewritten frequently before recording began. The first take of the song was used for the album, as Messenger remembered: "At the end [we] all stood in silence: had [we] got it in one go? Van called for another take, but stopped a few bars in because he felt it wasn't working. 'I think we’ve got it.'" "Gypsy" was recorded many times, but Morrison preferred the first take, because he thought it had the better vocal. There were sections of that version that the band had not played in time, which meant the bass part had to be redone. Messenger overdubbed a twelve string guitar part and backing vocals were added as well. There were two outtakes from the session, "Take Out the Garbage, Bring in the Trash" and "You've Got the Power". The former was in a similar style to James Brown, but was abandoned because, as Doug Messenger recalled, it "did not come together quickly". The latter had been recorded at an earlier date, but guitar overdubs were made by Messenger, and it was released as the B-side of "Jackie Wilson Said".

The final session was recorded at the Wally Heider Studios, San Francisco in April 1972. Gary Mallaber replaced Shlosser on drums and Tom Salisbury replaced Naftalin on piano. "Saint Dominic's Preview", "I Will Be There" and "Redwood Tree", the three songs recorded at the session, were arranged by Salisbury. He had perfect pitch, which allowed him to easily write down the music over the phone with instruction from Morrison: "[I] think he was relieved to have someone like me take over the chart preparation and arrangements of the songs he still needed to record for his next album. ... Everyone in the band was very cooperative and the rehearsals went very well. As I was perhaps the most experienced musician in the band, everyone seemed to accept my position as MD, even though Van didn't introduce me as such."

When asked in late May, less than two months before the eventual release of Saint Dominic's Preview, how the recording for album was going, Morrison said: "I've still got two more songs I've got to put together and right now I don't know where they're gonna come from. I'm pretty confused right now, but, y'know, I've got a feeling that everything's starting to come together … I think it's all gonna work out." Peter Wrench notes that Morrison had already recorded all the songs that were to feature on the album, which suggests "that ‘Listen To The Lion’ and ‘Almost Independence Day’ were not yet confirmed for inclusion on this release."

== Composition and themes ==
Unlike his two previous albums, Morrison spoke well of this one when interviewed by biographer Ritchie Yorke: "The album was kind of rushed because of studio time and things like that. But I thought it was a good shot, that album. There were a lot of good songs on it. St. Dominic's Preview was more into where I'm at, more into what I was doing."

The album opens with "Jackie Wilson Said (I'm in Heaven When You Smile)", which draws from the pop, R&B, jazz and blues genres and inspired lyrically, vocally and musically by Jackie Wilson and his hit song, "Reet Petite".

According to Rolling Stone reviewer Stephen Holden on "Gypsy": "Van states where he's at artistically; the rhythms, alternating between double and triple time, are driving and excited, the harmonies faintly Middle Eastern, and the multiple guitar textures exotic."

"I Will Be There" evokes Ray Charles, composed of heavily realistic lyrics that speak of the singer grabbing an overcoat, his toothbrush and underwear.

"Listen to the Lion" is an eleven-minute song that begins with a mellow opening and Morrison then improvises new singing methods, turning himself into a lion with growling, wailing and various other vocal techniques as the song progresses. It has been said to be, by both technique and emotion, "a vocal performance that remains unparalleled by his contemporaries." Caledonia, one of Morrison's favourite symbols, is referred to "during the coda when he works himself up into a trancelike gospel improvisation": "And we sailed and we sailed and we sailed and we sailed... way up to Caledonia." Brian Hinton described the song: "We are back in Astral Weeks territory, a bass led shuffle and Van lost in his own poetic universe, but here his voice takes wilder risks; growling, a near death rattle, feral grunts and roars." The chorus chanting "Listen to the Lion" behind the singer is made up of three male voices, including Morrison, "singing at himself".

The title track, "Saint Dominic's Preview", was said by Morrison to have been composed after seeing an ad for a peace vigil to be held at St. Dominic's Church in San Francisco. The song is written in a "stream of consciousness" fashion as with the Astral Weeks songs. Lyrics in the song refer to different stages of Morrison's life: "chamois cleaning all the windows" (teenage years) and "The record company has paid out for the wine" (his contemporary status as a pop music star). Erik Hage calls it "expansive and groundbreaking, representing an enlarging scope and ambition in Morrison's music."

"Redwood Tree" is reminiscent of "And It Stoned Me" on the Moondance album, with a soulful celebration of nature, water and a boy's childhood experiences.

"Almost Independence Day" is a two-chord cycle that uses a Moog synthesizer and various musical and vocal techniques to translate to the listener the feelings the singer had while staring across the San Francisco harbour. Along with "Listen to the Lion", it is more than ten minutes in length and has been compared to it as being as "musically daring in its own way". Erik Hage describes the song as "a mood piece, and a precursor to his 1980s work (particularly Common One), where his whole raison d'être became trying to inspire meditative states in the listener." Speaking of this song, Morrison told Ritchie Yorke: "It wasn't my concept to write a sequel to 'Madame George'. I like the song though. It was just contemplating organ and the Moog. Everything was recorded live except that one high part on the synthesiser. I asked Bernie Krause to do this thing of China Town and then come in with the high part because I was thinking of dragons and fireworks. It reminded me of that. It was a stream of consciousness trip again."

== Reception ==
Professional ratings
Review scores
Source	Rating
Allmusic	4.5/5 stars
Christgau's Record Guide	A−
The Irish Times	(not rated)
Rolling Stone	5/5 stars
Encyclopedia of Popular Music	5/5 stars
Uncut	5/5 stars

The album charted at number 15 on the Billboard 200. This would remain Morrison's best ever US charting until 2008's Keep It Simple came in at number 10 on the Billboard charts.

Erik Hage wrote that "it is one of the strongest albums in the Van Morrison canon because it seems to adapt and incorporate all of the lessons and discoveries of the rich period of evolution that came before it while still opening up new windows." Miles Palmer writing in The Times commented that "The cumulative impact is devastating."

In Rolling Stone, Stephen Holden wrote that "The coexistence of two styles on the same record turns out to be very refreshing; they complement each other by underscoring the remarkable versatility of Van's musical imagination." He also declared it "the best-produced, most ambitious Van Morrison record yet released".

Robert Christgau ends his A− rated review with: "The point being that words—which on this album are as uneven as the tunes—sometimes say less than voices. Amen."

The Allmusic review with a rating of 4.5 stars comments that the album, "hangs together on the strength of its songs, an intriguingly diverse collection which draws together the disparate threads of the singer's recent work into one sterling package."

It was voted number 71 in Colin Larkin's All Time Top 1000 Albums 3rd Edition (2000).

== Packaging ==
The cover photograph was shot on the steps of Montgomery Chapel on the grounds of the San Francisco Theological Seminary (pictured) in San Anselmo

The album was originally planned to be titled Green but it was changed after Morrison wrote the song "Saint Dominic's Preview" and used it as the title song. A Rolling Stone profile of Morrison in June 1972 quoted him as saying that the song had evolved from a dream about a St. Dominic's church gathering where a mass for peace in Northern Ireland was being held. Rolling Stone then commented that later while Morrison was in Nevada he read in a newspaper article that a mass was being held the next day for peace at a St. Dominic's church in San Francisco.

It was his first album not to have love as its central theme and significantly (as his marriage was deteriorating). The cover shows Morrison sitting on church steps playing guitar with ripped trousers and scruffy boots looking like a gypsy troubadour out on the street. Photographs for the album were taken by Michael Maggid in Montgomery Chapel in San Anselmo, California, near Morrison's home and where some of the recordings for the album took place, with the cover photograph shot on the steps of Montgomery Chapel on the grounds of the San Francisco Theological Seminary in San Anselmo.

== Track listing ==
All songs written by Van Morrison.

Side one
No.	Title	Length
1.	"Jackie Wilson Said (I'm in Heaven When You Smile)"	2:57
2.	"Gypsy"	4:36
3.	"I Will Be There"	3:01
4.	"Listen to the Lion"	11:07

Side two
No.	Title	Length
1.	"Saint Dominic's Preview"	6:23
2.	"Redwood Tree"	3:03
3.	"Almost Independence Day"	10:05

== Personnel ==
Musicians

- Van Morrison — lead vocals; acoustic, rhythm & twelve string guitars; backing vocals on "Listen to the Lion"
- Jules Broussard — tenor saxophone, flute
- Lee Charlton — drums on "Almost Independence Day"
- Bill Church — bass
- Ron Elliott — acoustic guitar on "Almost Independence Day"
- "Boots" Houston — tenor saxophone, backing vocals
- Mark T. Jordan — piano on "Listen to the Lion"
- Connie Kay — drums on "Listen to the Lion"
- Bernie Krause — Moog synthesizer on "Almost Independence Day"
- Gary Mallaber — drums, percussion, vibraphone
- John McFee — steel guitar on "Saint Dominic's Preview"
- Doug Messenger — electric, acoustic and twelve string guitars
- Ronnie Montrose — acoustic guitar, backing vocals on "Listen to the Lion"
- Mark Naftalin — piano, Moog synthesizer
- Pat O'Hara — trombone on "Saint Dominic's Preview" and "Gypsy"
- Janet Planet — backing vocals
- Tom Salisbury — piano, organ
- Rick Shlosser — drums
- Ellen Schroer — backing vocals
- Jack Schroer — alto and baritone saxophones
- Mark Springer — backing vocals on "Saint Dominic's Preview" and "Redwood Tree"
- Leroy Vinnegar — double bass on "Almost Independence Day"

Production

- Producers: Van Morrison, Ted Templeman
- Engineers: Donn Landee, Bob Schumaker, Jim Gaines, Dave Brown, Steve Brandon
- Mixing: Donn Landee, Bob Schumaker on "Jackie Wilson Said"
- Photography: Michael Maggid
- Arrangements: Van Morrison, Tom Salisbury on "I Will Be There", "Redwood Tree" and "Saint Dominic's Preview"
- Remastering: Tim Young, Walter Samuel

== Charts ==
=== Album ===
Chart (1972)	Peak position
Australia (Kent Music Report)	15
The Billboard 200	15
RPM Canada	14

=== Singles ===
Year	Single	Peak positions	
Year	Single	The Billboard Hot 100	RPM Canada
1972	"Jackie Wilson Said"	61	65
1972	"Redwood Tree"	98	—
1973	"Gypsy"	101	—
"—" denotes releases that did not chart.

== Sources ==
- Hage, Erik (2009). The Words and Music of Van Morrison, Praeger Publishers, ISBN 978-0-313-35862-3
- Hinton, Brian (1997). Celtic Crossroads: The Art of Van Morrison, Sanctuary, ISBN 1-86074-169-X
- Heylin, Clinton (2003). Can You Feel the Silence? Van Morrison: A New Biography, Chicago Review Press, ISBN 1-55652-542-7
- Marcus, Greil (2010). When That Rough God Goes Riding: Listening to Van Morrison, Public Affairs, ISBN 978-1-58648-821-5
- Mills, Peter (2010), Hymns to the Silence: Inside the Words and Music of Van Morrison, London: Continuum, ISBN 978-0-8264-2976-6
- Turner, Steve (1993). Van Morrison: Too Late to Stop Now, Viking Penguin, ISBN 0-670-85147-7
- Wrench, Peter (2012). Saint Dominic's Flashback: Van Morrison's Classic Album, Forty Years On, FeedARead. Kindle Edition. ISBN 9781781768600
- Yorke, Ritchie (1975). Into The Music, London: Charisma Books, ISBN 0-85947-013-X
- Van Morrison Anthology, Los Angeles: Alfred Music Publishing, 1999, ISBN 0-7692-8967-3
