= Jackie Wilson Said (I'm in Heaven When You Smile) =

1972 single by Van Morrison

Single by Van Morrison

from the album Saint Dominic's Preview
- B-side: "You've Got the Power"
- Released: 14 July 1972
- Recorded: 29 January 1972
- Studio: Pacific High (San Francisco)
- Genre: R&B; jazz; pop; rock and roll; blue-eyed soul
- Length: 2:57
- Label: Warner Bros.
- Songwriter: Van Morrison
- Producers: Van Morrison; Ted Templeman

Van Morrison singles chronology
"(Straight to Your Heart) Like a Cannonball" (1972)	"Jackie Wilson Said (I'm in Heaven When You Smile)" (1972)	"Redwood Tree" (1972)

"Jackie Wilson Said (I'm in Heaven When You Smile)" is a song written and performed by Van Morrison and featured as the opening track on his sixth studio album, Saint Dominic's Preview. It was released by Warner Bros. in July 1972 as the first of three singles from the album and charted at number 61 on the US Billboard Hot 100. Both the music and lyrics are inspired by rhythm and blues singer Jackie Wilson and his song "Reet Petite", which is directly quoted in the song.

"Jackie Wilson Said" was covered by Dexys Midnight Runners on their album Too-Rye-Ay and reached number five on the UK Singles Chart when released in 1982. It has also been covered by several other artists.

In 2021, Morrison's original version reached #1 on the Ireland radio airplay chart.

== Van Morrison's version ==
=== Recording and composition ===
The first known recording of "Jackie Wilson Said" was in January 1972 at singer and musician Lee Michaels' studio in Mill Valley, California. For this early demo, Morrison and Doug Messenger played guitars and Michaels contributed piano. Only three sections had been composed and there was no clear structure. On January 29 it was recorded with "Gypsy" at Pacific High Studios in San Francisco for his forthcoming album, Saint Dominic's Preview. Morrison was joined by his band at the time: Messenger on guitar; Rick Shlosser on drums; Bill Church on bass; Mark Naftalin on piano and Jack Schroer on saxophone. This version was released by Warner Bros. in July 1972 and featured as the opening tune on the album.

Morrison's band had only rehearsed the song once before the session, which led to the parts being rearranged in the studio. Despite the initial problems, the band recorded it in one take, as Messenger recalls: "At the end [we] all stood in silence: had [we] got it in one go? Van called for another take, but stopped a few bars in because he felt it wasn’t working. ‘I think we’ve got it.’" Overdubs were added later on by saxophonists Schroer and Rolf "Boots" Houston. Writer Peter Wrench commented that "What does seem clear, though, is that ‘Jackie Wilson’ is a genuine example of a one-take wonder which came together extraordinarily quickly as a shared creation in the moment."

According to Morrison "Jackie Wilson Said" was "particularly inspired" by a line in Jackie Wilson's song "Reet Petite". Morrison also acknowledged later in his career that his vocals are also influenced by the 1950s soul singer, remarking that Wilson's consecutive hits were an important influence in developing his early vocal style. According to biographer Peter Mills, Morrison's vocal performance, which borrows from early styles of rhythm and blues, pop, jazz and blues, "is prime time Morrison: tight, melodic, fully vocalised from the centre-back of the throat".

The tune is composed in the key of G major, with a chord progression of Am-D-Am-D-G for the verses and Am-Em-G-Am-D-G for the chorus. It is written in a swung 4/4 time and has a moderately bright tempo of 156 beats per minute. It also features a walking bassline. It was Doug Messenger's idea for Morrison to scat the introduction a cappella over handclaps. The saxophone section is introduced, playing in harmony with Morrison's vocal, which builds up until all the members of the band are playing on the track. Biographer John Collis writes that the "scat phrase kicking off the first track, 'Jackie Wilson Said', hotly pursued by a confident big band r'n'b arrangement, promises well." During the chorus, when Morrison sings the song's sub-title "I'm in Heaven", the band stops playing briefly. The vocal is accompanied by tapped out beats by Doug Messenger muting his guitar's strings. Morrison remembered in an interview that the song "came with just voice and guitar first ... I was just singing the sax riff."

Commenting on the joyful spirit of the song, Erik Hage describes "Jackie Wilson Said" as "about elation" and believes "the music inspires in the listener a sense of freewheeling abandonment and joy." Hage compared it to the pop R&B that Morrison "can summon at will" such as the songs "Domino" and "Wild Night" and went on to write that, "Somehow he is able to congeal the feeling of listening to one's favorite music and/or looking at a loved one's smile into song, and it just may be the most immediate and euphoric recording in his entire catalogue—it inspires a rush of emotion."

=== Reception ===
"Jackie Wilson Said" was released as a single in July 1972 in the US and August 1972 in the UK, with the rare and never again released song "You've Got the Power" as the B-side. It peaked at number 61 on the US Billboard Hot 100. Record World said the single "just about lives up to the promise of its title" and that it's an "exhilarating preview" of the album. Thomas Ryan wrote in 1996 that the song was "denied its commercial destiny by never gaining entry to the upper echelons of the singles charts, a fact as unacceptable as it is inexplicable."

In reviewing the album for the BBC, James Young describes the song as "soulful and uplifting" and comments that "it's awash with lyrical hooks powered by his increasingly mellifluous voice, and backed with pumping horns and rhythm section. It also showcases his signature utterances and vocalisations, the do-de-de-doos and dang-a-lang-a-langs, which are pure homage to his soul and doo-wop influences."

Robert Christgau wrote in his review of Saint Dominic's Preview, "'Jackie Wilson said it was reet petite,' he shouts for openers, and soon has me believing that 'I'm in heaven when you smile' says as much about the temporal and the eternal as anything in Yeats."

Reviewer Scott Floman states that the song was the best of "four monumental tracks" on the album commenting that, "The joyous 'Jackie Wilson Said (I'm In Heaven When You Smile)' starts the album off with three minutes of pop perfection, thereby continuing his recent trend of beginning each album with a great concise upbeat number. This grand horn heavy homage to another great r&b performer is the best of the bunch."

=== Other releases and in the media ===
In addition to its appearance on Saint Dominic's Preview, "Jackie Wilson Said" was included on Morrison's 1990 multi-platinum compilation album The Best of Van Morrison. In 2007, it was also included on two other compilation albums, Van Morrison at the Movies - Soundtrack Hits and Still on Top - The Greatest Hits. The recording released on Still on Top was remastered and featured as the album's opening track.

It has featured in two movies: the 1984 film The Pope of Greenwich Village, and as the opening theme of the film Queens Logic, released in 1991. Actress Whoopi Goldberg included the song as one of her eight Desert Island Discs on BBC Radio 4 on 10 May 2009.

=== Live performances ===
Morrison has performed "Jackie Wilson Said" 534 times in concert (as of 2018); despite its frequent appearances at live shows, the only officially released live version was on the 1999 single "Precious Time". This version was recorded on 7 December 1998 at a concert in Bierhuebeli, Bern, Switzerland. Live television broadcasts of the song have been aired twice: on 19 December 1998 in Phillipshalle, Düsseldorf, Germany, for the Rockpalast television series and again on 10 June 2000 from the Frognebadet in Oslo, Norway.

Following the song's release in 1972, Morrison only performed it twice in concert throughout the 1970s. Regular performances began in the mid-1980s on tours from 1984 to 1986. Subsequently, the next occasion of frequent performances was on Morrison's 1990 tour of Europe and the United States. After a four-year absence from concerts, it became a staple of live shows in the 1990s and 2000s.

=== Personnel ===
- Van Morrison – vocals, rhythm guitar
- Bill Church – bass
- Rolf "Boots" Houston – tenor saxophone
- Doug Messenger – electric guitar
- Mark Naftalin – piano
- Rick Shlosser – drums
- Jack Schroer – alto and baritone saxophones

=== Charts ===
Chart (1972)	Peak Position
Canada Top Singles (RPM)	65
US Billboard Hot 100	61

== Dexys Midnight Runners' version ==
"Jackie Wilson Said (I'm in Heaven When You Smile)"

Single by Dexys Midnight Runners & The Emerald Express

from the album Too-Rye-Ay
- B-side: "Let's Make This Precious" (7" & 12"); "T.S.O.P." (12")
- Released: August 1982
- Recorded: Summer 1982
- Genre: Soul
- Length: 3:03
- Label: Mercury
- Songwriter: Van Morrison
- Producers: Kevin Rowland; Clive Langer; Alan Winstanley

Dexys Midnight Runners & The Emerald Express singles chronology
"Come On Eileen" (1982)	"Jackie Wilson Said (I'm in Heaven When You Smile)" (1982)	"Let's Get This Straight from the Start" (1982)

English pop band Dexys Midnight Runners first performed "Jackie Wilson Said (I'm in Heaven When You Smile)" live at the Old Vic Theatre, London in November 1981. In the middle of 1982, they recorded it for Too-Rye-Ay, released in August 1982. Frontman Kevin Rowland admitted he "had a soft spot for the song", which was one of the reasons why the band covered it. It was released as the follow-up single to their number-one hit "Come On Eileen" and reached number five on the UK Singles Chart, as well as sixteen on the Dutch Top 40. The band's record label, Mercury Records, originally wanted "Jackie Wilson Said" to be released as the first single from Too-Rye-Ay, but "Come On Eileen" was considered a better take. It was originally intended that Van Morrison would contribute to the track, but instead he intoned comments for fans in a monologue as an album coda, which was eventually cut.

Cash Box said that the cover "is more horn happy than 'Come On Eileen,' but is equally delightful."

At the time of Too-Rye-Ay's release, it was often considered to be a "Van Morrison rip-off". Rowland later disputed this, commenting: "They weren't saying I was influenced by Van. They were saying it was a rip off. But I made that clear, I spoke about that. I covered one of his songs for god's sake!"

The song was reissued on several compilation albums including The Very Best of Dexys Midnight Runners, Dexys Midnight Runners – Mercury Master Series, Let's Make this Precious: The Best of Dexys Midnight Runners and it also was featured on the live album BBC Radio One Live in Concert.

Dexys Midnight Runners' version was included in "Bomb", a 1982 episode of the television series The Young Ones, as well as the 2012 romantic comedy film The Five-Year Engagement, which featured a number of Van Morrison originals and covers in its soundtrack. It was famously performed on Top of the Pops in front of a picture of Scottish darts player Jocky Wilson. There remains some debate as to whether it was a misunderstanding or a deliberate act. Kevin Rowland said: "It was our nickname for the song in rehearsals. And I'd just got so bored with all the promotion I asked the TOTP producer for it, to amuse myself, because I thought it'd be funny."

=== Personnel ===
- Billy Adams – banjo, guitar
- Mickey Billingham – organ, piano, accordion
- Giorgio Kilkenny – bass
- Brian Maurice – saxophone
- Big Jim Paterson – trombone
- Kevin Rowland – bass, guitar, piano, vocals
- Seb Shelton – drums
- Paul Speare – flute, saxophone, tin whistle
- Steve Wynne – bass

The Emerald Express:

- Helen O'Hara & Steve Brennan – violin

=== Charts ===
Chart (1982–83)	Peak position
Australia (Kent Music Report)	67
Belgium (Ultratop 50 Flanders)	14
Germany (GfK)	62
Ireland (IRMA)	7
Israel (IBA)	3
Netherlands (Dutch Top 40)	21
Netherlands (Single Top 100)	16
UK Singles (Official Charts)	5

== Other covers ==
It was covered by Tommy McLain in 1999 on the album The Cajun Rod Stewart: Crazy Cajun Recordings. A cover version of the song by Syl Johnson was released on the 2003 tribute album Vanthology: a Tribute to Van Morrison. Irish band Darby O'Gill covered the song on the 2004 album The Gettin's Good. David Campbell recorded a version on his 2008 album Good Lovin'. It also featured on his 2015 compilation album The Essential David Campbell. Head Automatica also released an acoustic cover of the song as part of the 2014 Fadeaway Records compilation Friends.
