= Gary Mallaber =

American drummer (born 1946)

Gary Mallaber (born October 11, 1946, in Buffalo) is an American musician from Los Angeles, mostly known as a drummer, but plays percussion, vibraphone, and keyboards. In addition, he is a songwriter, arranger, composer, producer, engineer, and actor. He began music lessons at six years old at PS #45. He attended Lafayette High School, where he and Bobby Militello, along with other musicians, were mentored by saxophonist Sam Scamacca. Mallaber got his start playing drums in a Buffalo band known as Raven.

Mallaber was the drummer-percussionist and backing singer for the 1980s band Kid Lightning, who released an album with Gerard McMahon in 1981 entitled Blue Rue.

Mallaber plays keyboards and sings on many albums by well-known rock artists. He is probably best known for his work as drummer-percussionist, backup singer, and co-composer for The Steve Miller Band. He has also played with the Greg Kihn Band. Mallaber was offered the job as drummer in Kiss, as a replacement when Peter Criss had left in 1980 but he did not accept the offer.

Mallaber was the main studio drummer for Eddie Money for most of his earlier recordings and has played on some Bruce Springsteen and Van Morrison solo albums. He was also in the 1974 Brian DePalma film Phantom of the Paradise; in addition to performing on the film's soundtrack he is seen in the film as the drummer for the Juicy Fruits, the Beach Bums, and The Undeads.

In addition to drums, Mallaber plays vibraphone on some of Morrison's records. As well as being featured on Miller, Morrison and Springsteen's albums, Mallaber has also played on hit singles by Peter Frampton, Poco, Paul Williams, Jimmy White and Kermit the Frog. Some of the other artists Mallaber has recorded with include Joan Armatrading, The Beach Boys, John Lennon, Gene Clark, David Cassidy, Bonnie Raitt, Tom Rush, Bob Seger, Barbra Streisand, Warren Zevon, Hughes/Thrall and Gerard McMahon. Since March 7, 2009, Mallaber has been standing in as temporary drummer for Dave Mason during his 2009 tour.

From 2023 to 2025 he has been on tour with AJ Croce.

He endorses Drum Workshop, Zildjian, and Regal Tip.
