= Astral Weeks Live at the Hollywood Bowl: The Concert Film =

Video by Van Morrison
- Released: May 19, 2009
- Recorded: November 7 and 8, 2008
- Venue: Hollywood Bowl, Los Angeles, California
- Genre: Blue-eyed soul
- Label: Listen to the Lion
- Producer: Van Morrison

Van Morrison chronology
| Live at Montreux 1980/1974 (2006) | Astral Weeks Live at the Hollywood Bowl: The Concert Film (2009) |

Astral Weeks Live at the Hollywood Bowl: The Concert Film is the second official DVD by Northern Irish singer-songwriter Van Morrison. It was released May 19, 2009 (see 2009 in music). It features the songs from his 1968 classic album, Astral Weeks. The live performances on the DVD were filmed from two separate concerts by Van Morrison at the Hollywood Bowl in Los Angeles, California, with a fourteen-member band. The DVD is featured as an Amazon.com Exclusive in the United States with a release date of May 19, 2009. Morrison also released an album on CD and vinyl on February 24, 2009, entitled Astral Weeks Live at the Hollywood Bowl with material from these two concerts.

Included as a trailer and entitled "To Be Born Again" is an interview conducted by Scott Foundas with Morrison explaining some of the meaning behind Astral Weeks and other footage behind the scenes. Some of the songs on the DVD have new sections that were added during the live performances on stage at the Hollywood Bowl. As producer of the CD and DVD, Morrison insisted on no post-production engineering so that the sound would be as close as possible to the live concert performances.

== Reception ==
Professional ratings
Review scores
| Source | Rating |
|---|---|
| USA Today | 4/4 stars |

Mike Clark with USA Today called it: "A preservation of last year's rhapsodically received Nov. 7 and 8 performances, kinetically photographed and edited for an even more succulent taste."

== Track listing for DVD ==
All songs, music and arrangements by Van Morrison

1. "Astral Weeks – I Believe I've Transcended"
2. "Beside You"
3. "Slim Slow Slider – I Start Breaking Down"
4. "Sweet Thing"
5. "The Way Young Lovers Do"
6. "Cyprus Avenue – You Came Walking Down"
7. "Ballerina – Move On Up"
8. "Madame George"
9. "Listen to the Lion – The Lion Speaks"

=== Bonus tracks (2009 DVD release) ===
1. "Common One"
2. "Gloria"

=== Bonus features ===
1. To Be Born Again – trailer

== Personnel ==
- Van Morrison – vocals, guitar, harmonica
- Jay Berliner – guitar
- Tony Fitzgibbon – violin, viola
- Roger Kellaway – grand piano
- David Hayes – double bass
- Bobby Ruggiero – drums
- Paul Moran – harpsichord, trumpet
- Richie Buckley – flute, saxophone
- Sarah Jory – 2nd rhythm guitar
- Liam Bradley – percussion
- Nancy Ellis – violin
- Terry Adams – cello
- Michael Graham – cello

=== On the bonus tracks ===
- John Platania – guitar (bonus material only)
- Rick Shlosser – percussion instrument – ("Gloria" only)
- Bianca Thornton – backing vocals (bonus material only)
- Liam Bradley – backing vocals – ("Gloria" only)
- John Densmore – tambourine ("Gloria" only)

== Credits ==
- Van Morrison – executive producer
- Gigi Lee – executive producer
- Josh Karchmer – producer
- Darren Doane and Van Morrison – directors
