= Astral Weeks Live at the Hollywood Bowl =

Live album by Van Morrison
- Released: 9 February 2009
- Recorded: 7 and 8 November 2008
- Venues: Hollywood Bowl, Los Angeles, California
- Genre: Folk rock
- Length: 68:46
- Label: Listen to the Lion
- Producer: Van Morrison

Van Morrison chronology
Keep It Simple (2008)	Astral Weeks Live at the Hollywood Bowl (2009)	Born to Sing: No Plan B (2012)

Astral Weeks Live at the Hollywood Bowl is the fifth live album recorded by Northern Irish singer/songwriter Van Morrison, released in the UK on 9 February 2009 and in the United States on 24 February 2009. It was recorded during two live concerts at the Hollywood Bowl in Los Angeles, California in 2008 and released on Morrison's new Listen to the Lion label and distributed by EMI.

The live performances of the eight original songs that feature on the album were recorded on 7 and 8 November 2008. Coincidentally, they took place forty years after Van Morrison's classic album Astral Weeks was first released by Warner Bros. Records in 1968. One of the original musicians, guitarist Jay Berliner, joined with the many other musicians on the revisited version of Astral Weeks.

The New York Daily News in the 4 January edition named Astral Weeks Live at the Hollywood Bowl as one of the "Five Most Anticipated Pop Music Events for 2009". The album won Live Album of the Year at the UK Music Producers Guild awards held on 11 February 2010.

A DVD of performances from the concerts, Astral Weeks Live at the Hollywood Bowl: The Concert Film is an Amazon.com Exclusive and was released on 19 May 2009.

== Production ==
Astral Weeks Live at the Hollywood Bowl
Sample from the live 2008 titled song, "Astral Weeks (I Believe I've Transcended)" shows "a deeper, louder roar than the blue-eyed soul voice of his youth – softer on the diction – but none the less impressively powerful."

With only one rehearsal prior to the concerts and with Morrison, as producer, insisting on no post-production engineering, the live album sounds essentially as it was heard by the concert goers. Morrison has said about the concerts and live sound of the recording: "The Hollywood Bowl concerts gave me a welcome opportunity to perform these songs the way I originally intended them to be." He was further quoted: "There are certain dynamics you can get in live recordings that you cannot get in a studio recording ... There was a distinct alchemy happening on that stage in Hollywood. I felt it." "The new record was recorded live, what [you hear] is what was played in its raw form. There was no mixing, no tweaking, no post-production at all, and I like that raw and edgy sound in real time."

== Astral Weeks Live in New York City ==
Van Morrison began a week of concerts and television appearances in New York City on 27 and 28 February 2009 to promote the new album. He performed the Astral Weeks songs along with some of his classics in two concerts at the WaMu Theater in Madison Square Garden and again on 3 and 4 March at the Beacon Theatre in New York City. During his stay in NYC, he made a guest appearance performing "Sweet Thing" on Jimmy Fallon's debut as host of Late Night with Jimmy Fallon on 2 March 2009. Morrison made another rare TV appearance the next morning on Live with Regis and Kelly on 3 March 2009.

== Reviews and critical analysis ==
Professional ratings
Aggregate scores
Source	Rating
Metacritic	77/100
Review scores
Source	Rating
Allmusic	4/5 stars
Blurt	10/10 stars
Daily Mirror	5/5 stars
Entertainment Weekly	A−
The Independent	5/5 stars
The Observer	4/5 stars
Paste	(82)
PopMatters	8/10 stars
RTÉ.ie	4/5 stars
Rolling Stone	3.5/5 stars

Astral Weeks Live at the Hollywood Bowl received rave reviews by prominent critics prior to release. Andy Whitman in Paste called the live album both "nearly miraculous" and a "tour-de-force", also further assessing it: "something delightfully unexpected and daring in a late career that has been increasingly characterized by playing it safe and keeping it simple." Another early review by Mike Ragogna of The Huffington Post notes: "Through it all, Morrison is where he wants to be, onstage and in Heaven, singing, playing sax, guitar, and harmonica. The band's camaraderie is communicated musically, especially between Morrison and Astral's original guitarist, Jay Berliner."

The word "transcendent" has often been used in the reviews of the concerts and live album of the Astral Weeks songs. A Blogcritics reviewer sums up his review with: "Van Morrison found the perfect outlet for his work. Not simply a rerelease, performing the songs again gives them even more soul than they did in 1968. There's a freedom to his voice that fills you up - like going to church - you feel deep inside. It's simple. It's transcendent." Daily News critic Jim Farber concluded: "But its most transcendent moments showcase the pleasure of letting a singer take his voice to the limit." The Observer critic's review commented that: "Transcendence is an overused word, but when Morrison hits his stride he seems to float onto another plane."

== Van Morrison on performing Astral Weeks live ==
Speaking of the 1968 Astral Weeks recording, Morrison told David Wild with Rolling Stone: "It received no promotion, from Warner Bros.—that's why I never got to play the songs live. I had always wanted to play the record live and fully orchestrated—that is what this is all about. I always like live recording and I like listening to live records too. I'm not too fond of being in a studio—it's too contrived and too confining. I like the freedom of live, in-the-moment sound."

In commenting further on the Hollywood Bowl performances in a January 2009 interview, Morrison said: "There was an alchemy that took place, I could feel it, and other people tell me they could literally see it occurring. I thought it was just going on within me. But apparently I was not alone. By the looks of it, far from it."

== The Hollywood Bowl concerts ==
The concerts both evenings were divided into two separate segments with a fifteen-minute intermission. The first half consisted of Morrison and the band performing some of his classic concert favourites and also his most popular tunes from over the years.

On both evenings, the Astral Weeks songs were performed in a different sequence than that of the original album. As performed in both concerts they were: "Astral Weeks", "Beside You", "Slim Slow Slider", "Sweet Thing", "The Way Young Lovers Do", "Cyprus Avenue", "Ballerina" and ending with "Madame George". On both evenings Morrison returned to the stage to perform "Listen to the Lion" for an encore.

7 November 2008 concert

The classic set list for the 7 November concert was: "Wavelength", "Saint Dominic's Preview", "And the Healing Has Begun", "It's All in the Game"/"You Know What They're Writing About", "Troubadours", "Angeliou", "Moondance", "Brown Eyed Girl" and "Gloria".

Critic's comments:

"True to form, he showed no interest in recreating what he did 40 years ago in a New York recording studio, but was focused on revamping the song structure dramatically in service of the present." (Randy Lewis - LA Times)

"To be sure, there were slight differences (in the most notable structural change, he moved the almost unbearably desolate album closer, "Slim Slow Slider" to earlier in the set, and finished with the marginally more cheerful "Madame George") but it was still recognizably —triumphantly—Astral Weeks." (Tim Page -The Washington Post)

8 November 2008 concert

The classic set list for the concert on 8 November was: "Wavelength", "Saint Dominic's Preview", "Caravan", "It's All in the Game", "Here Comes the Night", "And the Healing Has Begun", "Common One", "Brown Eyed Girl", and "Gloria".

Critic's comments:

"Revisiting past glories can be a risky proposition for artists...But on this evening, Morrison's spellbinding performance spoke to the timelessness of both the artist and his work." (Brian Egan - Billboard)

"Sometimes he evoked the fragility of the original material, but more often he took charge of the music with the authority that comes from four decades of performing, even shuffling the original playing order for no obvious reason." (Gavin Edwards - Rolling Stone)

== Track listing for CD ==
All songs written by Van Morrison

1. "Astral Weeks - I Believe I've Transcended"—6:32 - 3:24
2. "Beside You"—5:59
3. "Slim Slow Slider - I Start Breaking Down"—4:08 - 3:37
4. "Sweet Thing"—5:38
5. "The Way Young Lovers Do"—3:18
6. "Cyprus Avenue - You Came Walking Down"—4:40 - 1:19
7. "Ballerina - Move On Up"—6:36 - 3:09
8. "Madame George"—8:43

=== Bonus tracks ===
1. "Listen to the Lion - The Lion Speaks"—5:15 - 2:28
2. "Common One"—6:39

== Track listing for vinyl LP ==
All songs written by Van Morrison

=== Disc one ===
Side One

1. "Astral Weeks - I Believe I've Transcended"—6:32 - 3:24
2. "Beside You"—5:56

Side Two

1. "Slim Slow Slider - I Start Breaking Down"—4:08 - 3:37
2. "Sweet Thing"—5:38
3. "The Way Young Lovers Do"—3:18
4. "Cyprus Avenue - You Came Walking Down"—4:08 - 3:37

=== Disc two ===
Side Three

1. "Ballerina - Move On Up"—6:36 - 3:10
2. "Madame George"—8:46

Side Four

1. "Listen to the Lion - The Lion Speaks"—5:17 - 2:29
2. "Common One"—6:14
3. "Gloria"—6:24

== Personnel ==
- Van Morrison - vocals, guitar, harmonica, Hammond organ
- Jay Berliner - acoustic guitar
- Tony Fitzgibbon - violin, viola
- Roger Kellaway - grand piano
- David Hayes - double bass
- Bobby Ruggiero - drums
- Liam Bradley - percussion
- John Platania - guitar (bonus material only)
- Paul Moran - harpsichord, trumpet
- Richie Buckley - flute, saxophone
- Sarah Jory - rhythm guitar
- Bianca Thornton - backing vocals (bonus material only)
- Nancy Ellis - violin
- Terry Adams - cello
- Michael Graham - cello
- John Densmore - tambourine ("Gloria" only)

== Charts ==
Chart performance for Astral Weeks Live at the Hollywood Bowl
Chart (2009)	Peak position
Australian Albums (ARIA)	67
Austrian Albums (Ö3 Austria)	36
Belgian Albums (Ultratop Flanders)	53
Dutch Albums (Album Top 100)	31
German Albums (Offizielle Top 100)	45
Irish Albums (IRMA)	36
Italian Albums (FIMI)	35
New Zealand Albums (RMNZ)	15
Norwegian Albums (VG-lista)	36
Spanish Albums (Promusicae)	56
Swedish Albums (Sverigetopplistan)	17
UK Albums (Official Charts)	61
US Billboard 200	33
US Billboard Top Internet Albums	1
