= Live at Montreux 1980/1974 =

Video by Van Morrison
- Released: 16 October 2006
- Recorded: 30 June 1974, 10 July 1980
- Genre: Various
- Length: 144:00
- Label: Eagle Vision for Exile Productions Ltd.

Van Morrison chronology
Van Morrison The Concert (1990)	Live at Montreux 1980/1974 (2006)	Astral Weeks Live at the Hollywood Bowl: The Concert Film (2009)

Professional ratings
Review scores
Source	Rating
All About Jazz	(Favorable)
Allmovie	(Favorable)
Blog Critic	(Favorable)
Concert Live Wire	4/5 stars
Vintagerock.com	(Favorable)

Live at Montreux 1980/1974 is the first official DVD by Northern Irish singer-songwriter Van Morrison. It was released on 16 October 2006. The films consist of two separate performances by Van Morrison at the Montreux Jazz Festival in Switzerland. It was certified gold in May 2007 and platinum in June 2009.

A note by Claude Nobs on the sleeve notes for the DVD: "For all the years I have been producing the Montreux Jazz Festival, these two concerts will remain very deeply set in my memory as well as in the memory of all the people who enjoyed these concerts."

== Performances ==
=== 1974 ===
The concert performance at Montreux for the 1974 set (disc 2) was recorded on 30 June 1974. One of the songs played was "Bulbs", which was released as the single on the album Veedon Fleece. Three of the songs, "Twilight Zone", "Foggy Mountain Top" and "Naked in the Jungle", would not be officially released by Morrison until his 1998 compilation of outtakes, The Philosopher's Stone. Morrison wrote "I Like It Like That" when he was in Them, while "Heathrow Shuffle" was released on the 1995 live jazz album How Long Has This Been Going On. "Swiss Cheese" was never officially released except on this DVD. All of the songs, except for "Street Choir", were unfamiliar to the audience, who were expecting his more recognizable songs and according to Clinton Heylin, in Montreux "a familiar conflict arose between his own thirst for spontaneity and an audience's preference for being eased into any new musical progression." Less than a year later, Morrison would say that as soon as "you are committed to a series of concerts you lose all spontaneity. It's not jazz any more. The reason I first got into music and the reason I was then doing it were conflicting. It was such a paradox." During the concert but not shown on the DVD, Morrison angrily confronted a woman heckler who said he did not know how to play the blues.

Morrison's stripped-down band was assembled when he arrived at Montreux, with the help of festival manager Claude Nobs. Drummer Dallas Taylor from Crosby, Stills and Nash, British keyboardist Pete Wingfield and Jerome Rimson, bass player from Detroit, Michigan rounded out the quartet, with Morrison contributing vocals, saxophone, guitar and harmonica.

=== Critical response ===
Reviewer Doug Collette commented: "The way he altered his phrasing of the lyrics on "Street Choir" is the kind of ingenuity that made him one of the most remarkable singers of our time. A genuine charisma arises from his self-absorption that rivets the camera on Van."

In his review, Shawn Perry stated that "you’d never know that keyboardist Pete Wingfield, bassist Jerome Rimson, and drummer Dallas Taylor were not regular members of Morrison’s band, if such a band even exists. Together, the players meld into a tight and swift permutation."

=== 1980 ===
The Montreux concert performances of the songs on the first disc took place on 10 July 1980 and featured four of the songs that would appear on Morrison's next album, Common One. Other songs played were chosen from albums over the last twelve years of Morrison's recordings, returning even to Astral Weeks for an over seven-minute-long version of "Ballerina".

Unlike the 1974 Montreux performance, Morrison had played with all of the band members previously. Four of them had been part of the Caledonia Soul Orchestra, disbanded in 1973: David Hayes, Jef Labes, John Platania, and Dahaud Shaar. The other band members had all played on his last two recordings. David Hayes was a seasoned performer, having been part of the Caledonia Soul Orchestra and played bass on Common One and Into the Music.

Erik Hage singles out two of the performances at the concert, calling the interaction between the brass and Morrison "simply stunning" on "Troubadours" and "Angeliou" remarking that: "On the former, Ellis and Morrison were locked in with each other, Ellis offering high, intense blasts and Morrison crying out right back at him in the throes of that elusive musical 'connection' he spent so much of his life seeking out."

=== Critical response ===
Ray Ellis wrote of Morrison's 1980 performances: "He doesn't only give the individual band members room to stretch (in the best tradition of jazz), he immerses himself so deeply into the groove, his voice literally becomes one of the instruments, alternating between second sax and percussion in some of the songs."

Erik Hage summed up his impression of the concert performances with: "Here, a more gracious and positive Morrison threw himself into the experience and brought along a fleshed out big band."

== Track listing ==
All songs written by Van Morrison – except as noted.

=== Disc one – Live at Montreux 1980 ===
1. "Wavelength" – 7:44
2. "Kingdom Hall" – 4:24
3. "And It Stoned Me" – 4:00
4. "Troubadours" – 5:52
5. "Spirit" – 9:06
6. "Joyous Sound" – 2:52
7. "Satisfied" – 7:01
8. "Ballerina" – 7:12
9. "Summertime in England" – 10:03
10. "Moondance" – 4:11
11. "Haunts of Ancient Peace" – 7:53
12. "Wild Night" – 3:20
13. "Listen to the Lion" – 7:02
14. "Tupelo Honey" – 8:17
15. "Angelou" – 9:22

=== Disc two – Live at Montreux 1974 ===
1. "Twilight Zone" – 6:34
2. "I Like It Like That" – 4:53
3. "Foggy Mountain Top" – 4:34
4. "Bulbs" – 5:25
5. "Swiss Cheese" – 4:50 (Morrison, Pete Wingfield)
6. "Heathrow Shuffle" – 3:27
7. "Naked in the Jungle" – 6:33
8. "Street Choir" – 6:47
9. "Harmonica Boogie" – 11:36

== Personnel ==
=== Musicians ===
==== Disc one (1980) ====
- Van Morrison – vocals, electric guitar
- Pee Wee Ellis – soprano, tenor, alto and baritone saxophones, background vocals
- Mark Isham – soprano saxophone, trumpet, flugelhorn, piccolo trumpet, bass trumpet, background vocals
- John Allair – Hammond organ, synthesizer, background vocals
- Jef Labes – piano, Fender Rhodes
- John Platania – electric guitar
- David Hayes – bass, background vocals
- Dahaud Shaar – drums, percussion
- Peter Van Hooke – drums

==== Disc two (1974) ====
- Van Morrison – vocals, acoustic guitar, alto saxophone, harmonica
- Pete Wingfield – piano, Wurlitzer electric piano, background vocals
- Jerome Rimson – bass, background vocals
- Dallas Taylor – drums

=== Production ===
- Executive producer for Montreux Sounds – Claude Nobs
- Producer – Jim Parsons
- Director – Dick Carruthers
- Artwork – Eagle Rock Entertainment
- Photos – Georges A. Braunschwerg for GM Press

== Certifications ==
Certifications for Live at Montreux 1980/1974
Region	Certification	Certified units/sales
Australia (ARIA)	Platinum	15,000^{^}
Canada (Music Canada)	Platinum	10,000^{^}
Ireland (IRMA)	Platinum	4,000^{^}
New Zealand (RMNZ)	Gold	2,500^{^}
United States (RIAA)	Platinum	100,000^{^}
^{^} Shipments figures based on certification alone.
