= Ballerina (Van Morrison song) =

Song by Van Morrison

from the album Astral Weeks
- Released: November 1968
- Recorded: October 15, 1968
- Studio: Century Sound, New York City
- Genre: Folk rock
- Length: 7:00
- Label: Warner Bros.
- Songwriter: Van Morrison
- Producer: Lewis Merenstein

Astral Weeks track listing
- 8 tracks: 1. "Astral Weeks"; 2. "Beside You"; 3. "Sweet Thing"; 4. "Cyprus Avenue"; 5. "The Way Young Lovers Do"; 6. "Madame George"; 7. "Ballerina"; 8. "Slim Slow Slider"

"Ballerina" is the second to last song on Astral Weeks, the 1968 album by Northern Irish singer-songwriter Van Morrison.

== Recording and composition ==
"Ballerina" was recorded during the last Astral Weeks session on October 15, 1968, at Century Sound Studios in New York City. Lewis Merenstein was the producer.

Morrison wrote "Ballerina" upon first meeting his future wife, Janet (an actress and model), when touring the U.S. with his band Them in June 1966. Them guitarist Jim Armstrong remembers rehearsing and playing the song for the first time at the Waikiki Shell in Hawaii.

Morrison commented to Ritchie Yorke about his inspiration for the song: "I was in San Francisco one time in 1966 and I was attracted to the city. It was the first time I had been there, and I was sitting in this hotel and all these things were going through my head, and I had a flash about an actress in an opera house appearing in a ballet, and I think that's where the song came from." (Them played The Fillmore in San Francisco on June 23, 1966.)

The song has a simple chord pattern, but Morrison was able to make it sound like a mini-drama by altering the dynamics of his voice in the seven-minute song. Writer Brian Hinton says of the recording: "If anyone ever argues that Morrison cannot sing — an unlikely scenario anyway — then simply play them this. All human emotion is crystallised here, and subtly vocalised: desire, joy, hope, world weariness, consolation, awe and anticipation."

== Other releases ==
"Ballerina" is one of the songs performed on the 1980 Montreux concert that is featured on the second disc of Live at Montreux 1980/1974 that Morrison released in 2006. This song was also featured as a live performance on Morrison's 2009 album Astral Weeks Live at the Hollywood Bowl, recorded forty years after the classic album Astral Weeks was first released. In this performance, Morrison added to the ending of the song and entitled the new addition: "Move on Up".

== Covers ==
Gov't Mule released a cover version of "Ballerina" on their 2005 EP Mo' Voodoo. Duke Special performed a live version of "Ballerina" with the Inishowen Gospel Choir.

== Personnel ==
- Van Morrison – vocals, acoustic guitar
- Jay Berliner – acoustic guitar
- Richard Davis – double bass
- Connie Kay – drums
- John Payne – flute
- Warren Smith, Jr. – vibraphone
- Larry Fallon – string and horn arrangements
