= What a Way to Go (Mark Murphy album) =

Studio album by Mark Murphy
- Released: 1990
- Recorded: September 1990
- Studio: Sound on Sound Studios, New York
- Genre: Vocal jazz
- Length: 42:49
- Label: Muse
- Producer: Larry Fallon

Mark Murphy chronology
Kerouac, Then and Now (1989)	What a Way to Go (1990)	I'll Close My Eyes (1991)

What a Way to Go is a studio album by Mark Murphy.

What a Way to Go is the 28th album by American jazz vocalist Mark Murphy. It was recorded when Murphy was 58 years old and released by the Muse label in the United States in 1990. This album is a tribute to Sammy Davis Jr. who died May 16, 1990.

== Background ==
In the liner notes Mark Murphy wrote, "| dedicate this record to the living memory and genius of Sammy Davis, Jr., who discovered me at the Ebony Club in Syracuse, N.Y. in 1952. And here’s a hug for Sammy's widow, Altovise". According to Hal Webman and also to Peter Jones, Murphy mis-remembered the name of the club and also the year of the meeting: it was actually the Embassy Club on Harrison Street in Syracuse in 1953. At that meeting, Davis invited Murphy to sing with him at a nearby nightclub where Davis was appearing. The encounter led to an introduction to Stan Kenton and correspondence with Steve Allen. Five years later, after recording for Decca, Allen would have Murphy on his talk show, The Tonight Show, several times and also on his show Jazz Scene USA.

In letters Murphy wrote to the Mark Times fanzine he said, "This whole thing was a chance since I did not know Larry Fallon the producer/arranger. Joe Fields insisted Larry had the sound of the 90s at his fingertips, and I listened to tape he did with Gloria Lynne that has sold well. I am here to tell you the chance paid off...The strings and horns are the best synthesized orchestra sounds I've yet heard with a singer". He added that the album was targeted for the new-age music crowd in the USA.

== Recording ==
Joe Fields, founder of Muse Records, hired producer, arranger Larry Fallon, who Murphy did not know, for this recording. Fallon had previously done arrangements for Van Morrison (Astral Weeks), Nico (Chelsea Girl), Jimmy Cliff (Wonderful World, Beautiful People), the Rolling Stones ("Gimme Shelter"), Gil Scott-Heron (Bridges), Cy Coleman (Seesaw), and on Muse Records, Gloria Lynne (A Time for Love).

The supporting musicians included pianist Pat Rebillot who Murphy had worked with on Bridging a Gap (1972). The supporting band was composed of bass, drums, percussion, saxophone and guitar in addition to piano and synthesizer. But Murphy had worked with none of them before, except Rebillot.

The songs included unknown compositions from June Tonkin, a Seattle pianist, Stanley Ellis, a Boston drummer, and Reuben Brown. Murphy included an original composition, "Ding Walls" and also wrote lyrics to Lee Morgan's "Ceora". "Ding Walls", the final track, was a Gilles Peterson tribute. Peterson was the DJ who had helped revive Murphy's career in the 80s with the Acid-Jazz crowd. The album also includes standard ballads that Murphy loved.

== Reception ==
Professional ratings
Review scores
Source	Rating
The Rolling Stone Jazz & Blues Guide	4/5 stars
The Virgin Encyclopedia of Popular Music	3/5 stars
The Penguin Guide to Jazz Recordings	3/4 stars

Andy Rowan assigns this album 4 stars in The Rolling Stone Jazz & Blues Guide. (4 stars means, "Excellent: Four-star albums represent peak performances in an artist's career. Generally speaking, albums that are granted four or more stars constitute the best introductions to an artist's work for listeners who are curious").

Colin Larkin assigns 3 stars to the album in The Virgin Encyclopedia of Popular Music. (3 stars means, "Good: a record of average worth, but one that might possess considerable appeal for fans of a particular style").

The Penguin Guide to Jazz Recordings assigns the album 3 stars. (3 stars means," A good, middleweight set; one that lacks the stature or consistency of the finest records, but which will reward the listener tuned to its merits"). Cook and Martin write Murphy "still sets himself the most inventive of programs – Lee Morgan's 'Ceora', Reuben Brown's 'Clown In My Window' – and makes them happen".

Scott Yanow includes the album in his list of some of the best individual Muse sets by Mark Murphy in his book The Jazz Singers: The Ultimate Guide.

Murphy biographer Peter Jones said the reviews to this release were "muted", with some reviewers criticizing the use of synthesizers.

== Track listing ==
1. "What a Way to Go" (June Tonkin) – 6:09
2. "Ceora Lives" (Lee Morgan, Mark Murphy) – 4:10
3. "I Fall in Love Too Easily" (Jule Styne, Sammy Cahn) – 4:15
4. "Saxophone Joe" (H. Smith) – 3:36
5. "All My Tomorrows" (Jimmy Van Heusen, Cahn) – 6:02
6. "Jamaica (A Little Island of Calm)" (Randy Goodrum) – 5:57
7. "I Never Noticed Until Now" (Stanley Ellis) – 6:01
8. "Clown in My Window" (Reuben Brown) – 4:16
9. "Ding Walls" (Murphy) – 2:50

== Personnel ==
Performance

- Mark Murphy – vocals
- Francisco Centeno – bass
- Chris Parker – drums
- Allan Schwartzberg – drums
- Larry Fallon – synthesizer, arranger
- Sammy Figueroa – percussion
- John Kaye – percussion
- Pat Rebillot – piano
- John Cobert – synthesizer
- Danny Wilensky – tenor saxophone
- David Spinozza – guitar

Production

- Jay Messina – engineer
- Larry Fallon – producer
- Ron Warwell – graphic design
- Fred Bouchard – liner notes
- David Sinclair – photography
- Joe Brescio – mastering at Master Cutting Room, NYC
