= The Way Young Lovers Do =

Song by Van Morrison

from the album Astral Weeks
- Released: November 1968
- Recorded: 15 October 1968
- Studio: Century Sound, New York City
- Genre: Folk rock; blue-eyed soul; jazz
- Length: 3:10
- Label: Warner Bros.
- Songwriter(s): Van Morrison
- Producer(s): Lewis Merenstein

Astral Weeks track listing
- 8 tracks: 1. "Astral Weeks"; 2. "Beside You"; 3. "Sweet Thing"; 4. "Cyprus Avenue"; 5. "The Way Young Lovers Do"; 6. "Madame George"; 7. "Ballerina"; 8. "Slim Slow Slider"

"The Way Young Lovers Do" is a song by Northern Irish singer-songwriter Van Morrison from his second solo album, Astral Weeks. It was recorded in 1968, at Century Sound Studios New York City, during September and October of that year. The song is in triple metre. The distinctive feel of the original recording emerges from the non-rock style of double-bass phrasing by veteran jazzman Richard Davis and additional jazz musician session players, which combined with Morrison's soulful vocals, creates a relatively unusual combination of stylistic elements.

Brian Hinton believes that "The song is about growing up, an adolescent first kiss, and still conveys the same sweet mystery as 'Astral Weeks' but more upfront."

In Ritchie Yorke's biography on Van Morrison he comments that Van Morrison told him, "On the second side 'Young Lovers Do' is just basically a song about young love" and that Morrison then laughed mysteriously.

In a 1969 issue of Rolling Stone about Astral Weeks Greil Marcus remarks: "It is pointless to discuss this album in terms of each particular track; with the exception of 'Young Lovers Do', a poor jazz-flavored cut that is uncomfortably out of place on this record, it's all one song, very much 'A Day in the Life.'"

In his review, Scott Thomas writes:

"The Way Young Lovers Do" is an interesting one. On its surface, with its images of tranquil lovers walking through fields and kissing on front stoops, it seems to deliver the romantic bliss anticipated so fervently in "Sweet Thing". The music, however, betrays some disturbing undercurrents.

== In the media ==
"The Way Young Lovers Do" was one of the songs in the soundtrack of the 1997 movie, Welcome to Sarajevo.

== Appearance on other albums ==
"The Way Young Lovers Do" was featured on Morrison's album Astral Weeks Live at the Hollywood Bowl, released in 2009 to celebrate forty years since Astral Weeks was first released. A jazz arrangement is featured on the 2018 album he recorded with organist Joey DeFrancesco entitled You're Driving Me Crazy.

== Personnel ==
- Van Morrison – vocals, acoustic guitar
- Richard Davis – double bass
- Connie Kay – drums
- Barry Kornfeld – guitar
- John Payne – flute
- Warren Smith, Jr. – percussion, vibraphone
- Larry Fallon – string and horn arrangements

== Covers ==
- Maria McKee included a cover of "The Way Young Lovers Do" on her 1993 album, You Gotta Sin to Get Saved.
- A cover of "The Way Young Lovers Do" is included on Jeff Buckley's first live EP Live at Sin-é released in 1993, and therefore is also included on Buckley's 2004 posthumously released Live at Sin-é (Legacy Edition), which provides the full recording of the 1993 Sin-é concert.
- Starsailor released their version of this song as a B-side on their second single, Good Souls, released in April 2001.
- The Winding Stair
- Hugh Cornwell included a version of "The Way Young Lovers Do" on his 2011 album You're Covered.
- Mick Harvey covered it on his 2013 album Four (Acts of Love).
