= Madame George =

Song by Van Morrison

from the album Astral Weeks
- Released: November 1968
- Recorded: 25 September 1968
- Genre: Folk rock
- Length: 9:45
- Label: Warner Bros.
- Songwriter: Van Morrison
- Producer: Lewis Merenstein

Astral Weeks track listing
- 8 tracks: 1. "Astral Weeks"; 2. "Beside You"; 3. "Sweet Thing"; 4. "Cyprus Avenue"; 5. "The Way Young Lovers Do"; 6. "Madame George"; 7. "Ballerina"; 8. "Slim Slow Slider"

"Madame George" is a song by Northern Irish singer-songwriter Van Morrison. It appears on the album Astral Weeks, released in 1968. The song features Morrison performing the vocals and acoustic guitar. It also features a double bass, flute, drums, vibraphone, and a string quartet.

== Recording and composition ==
"Madame George" was recorded during the first Astral Weeks session that took place on 25 September 1968, at Century Sound Studios in New York City with Lewis Merenstein as producer.

The main theme of the song is contentious. Some believe it is about leaving the past behind. The character of Madame George is considered by many to be a drag queen, although Morrison himself denied this in a Rolling Stone interview. He later claimed that the character was based on six or seven different people: "It's like a movie, a sketch, or a short story. In fact, most of the songs on Astral Weeks are like short stories. In terms of what they mean, they're as baffling to me as to anyone else. I haven't got a clue what that song is about or who Madame George might have been."

Van Morrison, speaking to biographer Ritchie Yorke about the writing and meaning of the song, said in part:

"Madame George" was recorded live. The vocal was live and the rhythm section and the flute too and the strings were the only overdub. The title of the song confuses one, I must say that. The original title was "Madame Joy" but the way I wrote it down was "Madame George". Don't ask me why I do this because I just don't know. The song is just a stream of consciousness thing, as is "Cyprus Avenue"..."Madame George" just came right out. The song is basically about a spiritual feeling.

An earlier recording with slightly altered lyrics and a much swifter tempo changes the tone considerably from the Astral Weeks recording, which is downbeat and nostalgic; the earlier recording is joyous, and seems to be from the point of view of a partygoer who sees the titular character. This version surfaced on the 1973 release T.B. Sheets, which compiled unreleased recordings Morrison had made for Bang Records in 1967.

This song contains a number of references to places and events in Van Morrison's native Belfast: Cyprus Avenue (also the title of another song on Astral Weeks) is a tree lined, up-market residential street in east Belfast; "throwing pennies at the bridges down below" was a practice of Northern Irish Unionists as they travelled on the train from Dublin to Belfast where the train crossed the River Boyne (site of the Battle of the Boyne, 1690); the train from Dublin arrived in Belfast at one end of Sandy Row, a working class staunchly Unionist/Protestant street and neighbourhood. Fitzroy may be a reference to Fitzroy Avenue, a narrow residential street in Belfast between the Ormeau Road and Rugby Road.

Comedian Frankie Boyle suggested it was a song about Van Morrison's mother in a video on Instagram. This is suggested by the line "With a childlike vision leaping into view Clicking, clacking of the high heeled shoe." Boyle suggests this is a child walking behind his mother down the street. This, according to Boyle is why Van Morrison is so miserable, as no one understands what he is saying.

== Reception ==
The rock journalist Lester Bangs wrote in 1979 that the song "is the album's whirlpool. Possibly one of the most compassionate pieces of music ever made, it asks us, no, arranges that we see the plight of what I'll be brutal and call a lovelorn drag queen with such intense empathy that when the singer hurts him, we do too." Bangs also remarks that "Morrison has said in at least one interview that the song has nothing to do with any kind of transvestite – at least as far as he knows, he is quick to add – but that's bullshit." Indeed, the lyrics contain the lines "In the corner playing dominoes in drag/The one and only Madame George".

Artist Mark Wallinger said of "Madame George": "The sense of desire and loss expressed in this song is so sad because it dares one to try to hear it again as if for the first time. It describes our exile from our past. Radical, allusive, heartbreaking, and the ultimate three-chord trick."

In 1974, after he had recorded eight albums, Morrison told Ritchie Yorke when he asked him what he considered his finest single track and the one that he enjoyed the most that it was: "Definitely 'Madame George', definitely. I'm just starting to realize it more and more. It just seems to get at you... it just lays right in there, that whole track. The vocals and the instruments and the whole thing. I like that one."

== Influence ==
A perennial favorite among rock critics, Van Morrison's "Madame George" is included in The Rock and Roll Hall of Fame's 500 Songs that Shaped Rock and Roll. It also ranked as No. 467 on the WXPN's All Time 885 Greatest Songs, compiled in 2004 from listener's votes, climbing to No. 356 in 2014.

Madame George appears in the "Black Boys on Mopeds" lyrics of Sinéad O'Connor: "England's not the mythical land of Madame George and roses" suggesting that she is a legendary figure. David Gray pays tribute to the song on the final track of his album White Ladder, with his cover version of the Soft Cell song, "Say Hello, Wave Goodbye", which ends similarly and even borrows lyrics "Through the rain, hail, sleet and snow, say goodbye. Get on the train, the train and say goodbye". In David A. Stewart and the Spiritual Cowboy's song "Out of Reach", from the album Honest, there is a line that goes: "Madame George got played today, she almost forgot she could feel that way". The American rock band Hat On, Drinking Wine takes their name from a lyric from the song: "He's much older now/With hat on, drinking wine."

When singer-songwriter Joan Armatrading appeared on Desert Island Discs talking to Sue Lawley on 29 January 1989, "Madame George" was selected as one of the eight records she would like to take to her desert island, and also as the one favoured record she would most want to save if the other seven were lost.

Likewise, when musician Bruce Springsteen appeared on Desert Island Discs on talking to Kirsty Young on 18 December 2016, he also named "Madame George" as one of his eight, saying that it was his favorite cut from Astral Weeks, which as a whole had been transformative for him, and that his 1973 song "New York City Serenade" would not have existed without it. Music writers have heard the influence of "Madame George" in other songs from Springsteen's early career, most obviously "Backstreets" (due to the repeated use of the phrase "backstreets" in both it and near the end of "Madame George"), and in the length and culminations of "Drive All Night", (which itself came out of late 1970s concert performances of "Backstreets"). In addition, the spirits of "Madame George" have been seen reflected in the summer depictions of "4th of July, Asbury Park (Sandy)". And although not a direct imitation, the riff that the string quartet repeats at the end of "Madame George" is mimicked at the end of the song "Born to Run".

Singer/songwriter Harry Styles has cited "Madame George" as one of his favorite songs, and Astral Weeks as his favorite album.

It is included on the soundtrack of the Steve McQueen thriller Widows (2018).

== Other releases ==
"Madame George" was featured on Morrison's album Astral Weeks Live at the Hollywood Bowl, released in 2009 to celebrate forty years since Astral Weeks was first released.

== Covers ==
- Marianne Faithfull performed this song on the 1994 Van Morrison tribute album No Prima Donna: The Songs of Van Morrison. Faithfull's version also plays over the closing credits of Dagmar Hirtz's film Moondance (1995). Faithfull's version of the song was also released as a single in 1994, with Morrison's "Queen of the Slipstream" as the B-side.
- Jeff Buckley recorded a cover version of this song.
- Energy Orchard covered "Madame George" on their 1993 album, Shinola.
- Phoebe Snow covered "Madame George" on her 1998 album I Can't Complain.
- Eric Bell released a live cover of the song on his album Live Tonite...Plus!.
- Ursula Burns

== Personnel ==
- Van Morrison – vocals, acoustic guitar
- Richard Davis – double bass
- Connie Kay – drums
- John Payne – flute
- Larry Fallon – string arrangements
