= And the Healing Has Begun =

Song by Van Morrison

from the album Into the Music
- Released: August 1979
- Recorded: Spring 1979
- Studio: Record Plant Studios, Sausalito, California
- Genre: Celtic, folk rock, pop rock
- Length: 7:59
- Label: Warner Bros.
- Songwriter(s): Van Morrison
- Producer(s): Van Morrison

"And the Healing Has Begun" is a song written by Northern Irish singer-songwriter Van Morrison and recorded on his 1979 album, Into the Music.

== Recording and composition ==
"And the Healing Has Begun" was recorded at the Record Plant Studios in Sausalito, California in spring 1979 with Mick Glossop acting as engineer.

Biographer Brian Hinton calls it the central song in the album and perhaps in Morrison's whole career: "It starts just like 'Cyprus Avenue', no coincidence as the line about 'songs from way back when' hints, and with a walk down the avenue (of dreams), to the sound of a haunted violin. A song of full, blazing sex as well as revelation. The healing here is like that in Arthurian myth, the wounded King restored through the action of the Holy Grail, but it is also through as graphic a seduction, almost, as the original live version of 'Gloria'".

Author Clinton Heylin concludes that "what makes the song, and indeed Into the Music work is its self-awareness. Gone is the awkward self-consciousness... It is replaced by a newly assured tone, born of a genuine awareness of what he (Morrison) was attempting."

== Personnel ==
- Van Morrison: vocals, guitar
- John Allair: organ
- Herbie Armstrong: guitar
- David Hayes: bass guitar
- Mark Jordan: piano
- Toni Marcus: violin, viola
- Peter Van Hooke: drums

== Covers ==
Glen Hansard covered the song in the 2006 musical film, Once (Collector's Edition of Original Soundtrack). The Waterboys live performance in 1986 is one of the tracks on their album, Live Adventures of the Waterboys. Bronagh Gallagher covered it as part of the Hot Press Rave On Van Morrison project to celebrate Morrison's 75th birthday.
