= Astral Weeks (song) =

Song by Van Morrison

from the album Astral Weeks
- Released: November 1968
- Recorded: 25 September 1968
- Genre: Folk rock
- Length: 7:00
- Label: Warner Bros.
- Songwriter(s): Van Morrison
- Producer(s): Lewis Merenstein

Astral Weeks track listing
- 8 tracks: 1. "Astral Weeks"; 2. "Beside You"; 3. "Sweet Thing"; 4. "Cyprus Avenue"; 5. "The Way Young Lovers Do"; 6. "Madame George"; 7. "Ballerina"; 8. "Slim Slow Slider"

Audio sample
- file; help

"Astral Weeks" is the title song and opening track on the 1968 album Astral Weeks by Northern Irish singer-songwriter Van Morrison.

== Recording ==
On the first recording session for the album on 25 September 1968, this song was the last of four recorded for that date. John Payne, the flautist who had been working with Morrison, said it was the first time he had ever heard it, and that although the song may sound rehearsed it was actually captured from the only take.

== Composition ==
Morrison described the song "Astral Weeks" as being: "like transforming energy, or going from one source to another with it being born again like a rebirth. I remember reading about you having to die to be born. It's one of those songs where you can see the light at the end of the tunnel and that's basically what the song says." Morrison told Steve Turner that he was working on the song back in Belfast in 1966 when he visited painter Cecil McCartney who had drawings on astral projection "and that's why I called it "Astral Weeks".

Brian Hinton's review of the song states: "All is uncertain, this spiritual rebirth a question still, not a statement, and Van equates his move to a new world — both America and that of love— with a sense of being lost, "ain't nothing but a stranger in this world".

== Acclaim ==
The song "Astral Weeks" was rated #475 on the WXPN All Time Greatest Songs in 2004 and No. 875 on the list of 885 Essential Songs voted on by listeners of WXPN in 2008.

== Appearance on other albums ==
"Astral Weeks" was featured on Morrison's album Astral Weeks Live at the Hollywood Bowl, released in 2009 to celebrate forty years since Astral Weeks was first released.

== Personnel ==
- Van Morrison – vocals, acoustic guitar
- Jay Berliner – classical guitar
- Richard Davis – double bass
- John Payne – flute
- Warren Smith, Jr. – percussion, vibraphone
- Larry Fallon – string arrangements

== Covers ==
The song "Astral Weeks" has been covered by Glen Hansard of The Frames, Brian Houston, and The Secret Machines on their EP The Road Leads Where It's Led.
