= 4% Pantomime =

Song by The Band

from the album Cahoots
- Released: September 15, 1971
- Genre: Rock
- Length: 4:32
- Label: Capitol
- Songwriter(s): Robbie Robertson, Van Morrison
- Producer(s): The Band

"4% Pantomime" is a song written by Robbie Robertson and Van Morrison. It was first released on the Band's 1971 album Cahoots.

== Lyrics and music ==
Robertson had started writing "4% Pantomime" and finished it with Morrison when Morrison dropped by to visit the Band at Bearsville Studios near Woodstock, New York before Morrison moved to California. Morrison and Richard Manuel sing the lead vocals as a duet, with Manuel taking the first verse and Morrison taking the second. Among the lyrics, Morrison calls to Manuel as "Richard" and Manuel calls to Morrison as the "Belfast Cowboy", a nickname Robertson came up with for Morrison. The song tells the story of two drunk musicians stuck in Los Angeles with only a bottle of whiskey. The lyrics also make references to the two men gambling at playing cards. Rolling Stone Magazine critic Jon Landau described the theme of the song as being about "being a working artist". Berwyn Life critic Steve Sparacio stated that the lyrics work even though the lines sometimes seem to be strung together in ways that don't make sense, giving as an example "And I don't know whether to call or to check/But right now I feel like I got a royal flush/And my lady didn't show from 'Frisco/But we had to go on with the show." Geoffrey Cannon of The Guardian praises the internal rhymes in some of Morrison's lines, such as "Oh Richard tell me who's got the joker and is it poker."

The "4%" in the title of the song refers to the difference in alcohol content between two brands of whiskey: Johnnie Walker Red and Johnnie Walker Black. Morrison biographer Brian Hinton disputes this theory about the title, and attributes it to music journalist Ritchie Yorke. The "pantomime" in the title refers to the fact that Morrison and Manuel acted out the lyrics as they recorded the song.

According to Robertson, "They were acting this whole thing out. For a second while I was watching it, it became soundless – all hands and veins and necks. It was almost like this whole movement thing was going on and the music was carrying itself." Band drummer Levon Helm stated that "It was an extremely liquid session. Van and Richard were into it, and there was horror among the civilians at the studio when the two dead-drunk musicians argued about who would drive the other one home. Richard drove, and I think he made it. Lord knows he wrecked a lot of cars that year."

The Band FAQ author Peter Aaron describes the song as "soul–blues". According to Hinton, Morrison and Manuel "shout vocal lines at each other like long lost soul brothers". Music critic Nick DeRiso describes Rick Danko's bass guitar playing as having "thunderous funk" and Garth Hudson's keyboard playing as having an "appropriate slur". He also described Robertson's lead guitar playing towards the end of the song as pushing "the song ever onward via a tornadic riff". Hinton describes Hudson's keyboard playing as sounding like a "defrocked church organist".

== Reception ==
Music critic Barney Hoskyns described "4% Pantomime" as a "highlight" of Cahoots. Rolling Stone Album Guide contributor Paul Evans similarly called "4% Pantomime" one of the "great highlights" of Cahoots. Fellow Rolling Stone Album Guide contributor Mark Kemp said that it was one of the few songs on Cahoots that approached "the quality of the Band's previous work". Sparacio called it "the most exciting cut on Cahoots". Music journalist Erik Hage describes it as "a rousing track". Allmusic critic William Ruhlmann described it as being "entertaining to hear, even if the song itself is slight". Miami News critic Susan Brink described the vocal performances as "candles on the perfect cake" and stated that the song's "explosive beauty" speaks for itself.

"4% Pantomime" was included on the Band's 1989 compilation album To Kingdom Come: The Definitive Collection.
