= Sweet Thing (Van Morrison song) =

Song by Van Morrison

from the album Astral Weeks
- Released: November 1968
- Recorded: 15 October 1968
- Studio: Century Sound, New York City
- Genre: Folk rock; jazz; blues
- Length: 4:22
- Label: Warner Bros.
- Songwriter: Van Morrison
- Producer: Lewis Merenstein

Astral Weeks track listing
- 8 tracks: 1. "Astral Weeks"; 2. "Beside You"; 3. "Sweet Thing"; 4. "Cyprus Avenue"; 5. "The Way Young Lovers Do"; 6. "Madame George"; 7. "Ballerina"; 8. "Slim Slow Slider"

"Sweet Thing" is a song by Northern Irish singer-songwriter Van Morrison, released on his second studio album Astral Weeks (1968). It is sequenced on the first side of the album, which is entitled In the Beginning.

== Recording and composition ==
"Sweet Thing" was recorded during the last Astral Weeks session on 15 October 1968, at Century Sound Studios in New York City with Lewis Merenstein as producer. Morrison described the song to Ritchie Yorke: "'Sweet Thing' is another romantic song. It contemplates gardens and things like that...wet with rain. It's a romantic love ballad not about anybody in particular but about a feeling". It is the only song on the album that looks forward instead of backward.

== Reception and legacy ==
In The Words and Music of Van Morrison, author Erik Hage wrote:

"Sweet Thing" is one of the most beautiful and euphoric songs in the Morrison catalogue, humming along on the sweet undercurrent of [Richard] Davis's bass and the levity in Morrison's lyrics and delivery. Here, as in the past, Morrison turns to the natural landscape as an external reflection of the internal pulse of love, again signaling kinship with English romantic poetry. The lyrics find expressions of love in jumping hedges, watching ferry boats, and strolling and talking with his sweet thing "in gardens all wet with rain." "My, my, my, my, my sweet thing," sings Van Morrison, exercising his penchant for emotionally connected, expressive repetition.

William Rulhmann of Allmusic called the song "effervescent" and a "musical meditation", contrasting with the more somber mood of the rest of the album. The New York Times considered it "nothing less than a slice of mystery: rhythms like the angular slant of rain, violins arching like branches, the strange flight of a flute and a voice hushed with sadness...transparent, as incorporeal as time or light". Mark Seymour, writing for The Guardian, called it "the most perfect song of all time".

== Other releases ==
"Sweet Thing" is the only song from Astral Weeks included on the 1990 compilation album The Best of Van Morrison. It was also featured on Morrison's album Astral Weeks Live at the Hollywood Bowl, released in 2009 to celebrate forty years since Astral Weeks was first released.

== Personnel ==
- Van Morrison – vocals, acoustic guitar
- Jay Berliner – classical guitar
- Richard Davis – double bass
- Connie Kay – drums
- John Payne – flute
- Warren Smith Jr. – triangle
- Larry Fallon – string arrangements

== Certifications ==
Certifications for "Sweet Thing"
Region	Certification	Certified units/sales
New Zealand (RMNZ)	Gold	15,000^{‡}
^{‡} Sales+streaming figures based on certification alone.
