= Sin-é =

1989–2007 music venues in New York City

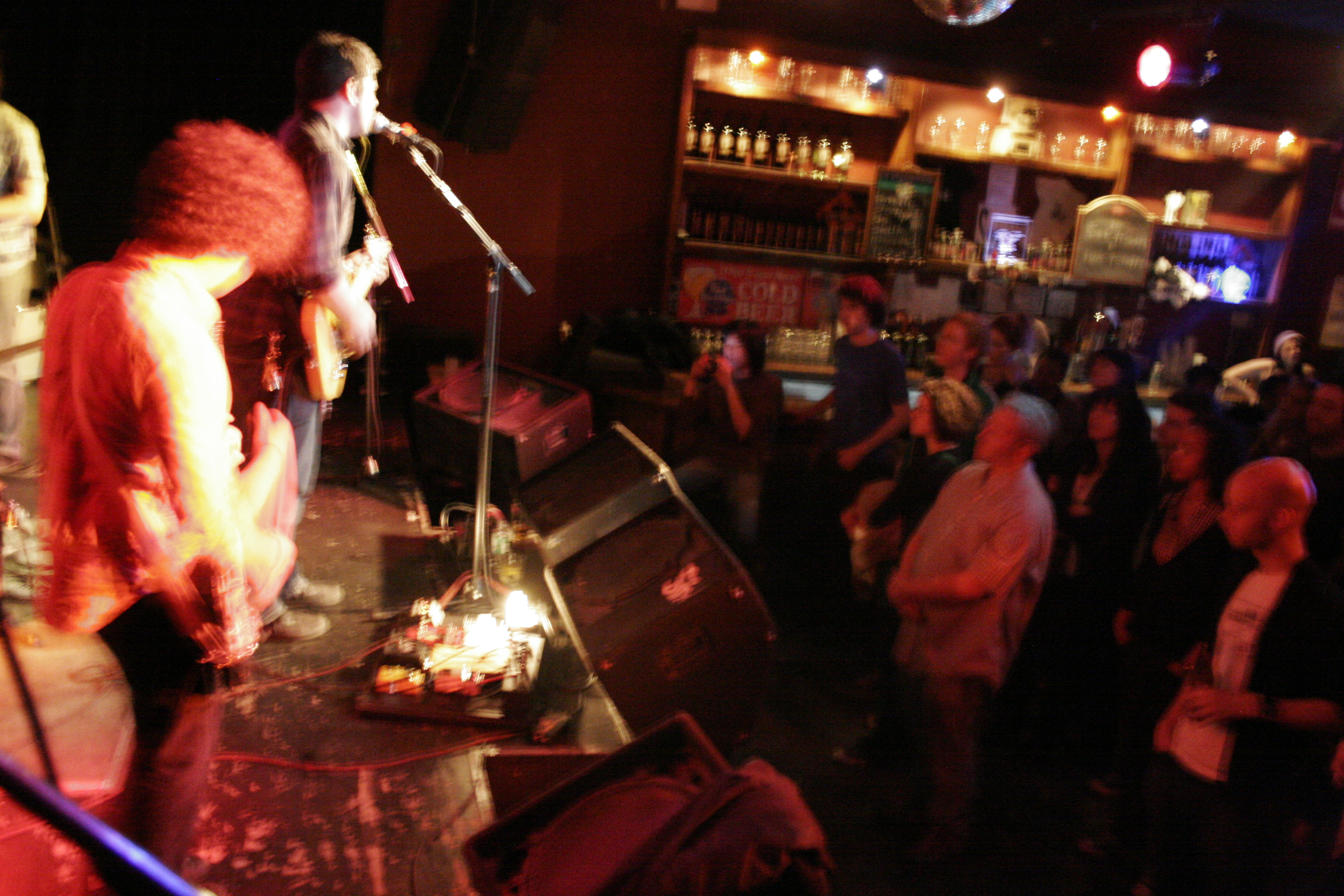
- Pela performing at the final incarnation of Sin-é in 2007
- Location: New York City
- Owner: Shane Doyle

Construction
- Opened: 1989–96; 2000; 2003–07 (varying incarnations)

Sin-é (/ʃɪˈneɪ/; from the Irish phrase sin é meaning "that's it") was a music venue in East Village, Manhattan. It helped launch the careers of several noted musicians in the early 1990s.

== History ==
=== Original café ===
The original Sin-é, located at 122 St. Mark's Place in Manhattan's East Village, was a small café that served food, coffee, and Rolling Rock beer. It was opened by the Irish immigrant Shane Doyle in 1989. The early days saw a number of poetry readings and acoustic sessions. One group that began to attract a wider audience on Saturday nights was the Clumsy Cabaret, a late-night gathering that drew musicians (including many of New York's anti-folk scene) after gigs. Acoustic music sessions took place in a spontaneous and creative atmosphere. Patrons included emerging writers, photographers, artists, designers and musicians. Later, as a more established venue, performers played for tips.

Performers such as Allen Ginsberg, Marianne Faithfull, Sinéad O'Connor, Jeff Buckley, October Project, Shane MacGowan, Hothouse Flowers, the Waterboys, Susan McKeown, Star Drooker and the band Native Tongues appeared at Sin-é, giving impromptu performances. The stage was an area where tables were cleared away against a wall.

The informal atmosphere and regular audience were instrumental in creating a fertile musical scene that flourished until Sin-é closed in 1996. Jeff Buckley's first release was the EP Live at Sin-é (1993).

=== Later venues ===
In 2000, Doyle opened a 380-capacity version of Sin-é on North Eighth Street just off of Bedford Avenue in Williamsburg, Brooklyn. Due to problems with the city and complaints by nearby residents, the club closed after only a few months.

Opened in 2001 and located at 150 Attorney Street, at the corner of Stanton Street on the Lower East Side of Manhattan, the last Sin-é was named "Best Return Engagement" in New York's "Best of New York" issue of March 2003. The venue and bar closed on April 2, 2007, reportedly due to the area's gentrification.
