= Cyprus Avenue =

Song by Van Morrison

from the album Astral Weeks
- Released: November 1968
- Recorded: 25 September 1968
- Genre: Folk rock
- Length: 6:50
- Label: Warner Bros.
- Songwriter: Van Morrison
- Producer: Lewis Merenstein

Astral Weeks track listing
- 8 tracks: 1. "Astral Weeks"; 2. "Beside You"; 3. "Sweet Thing"; 4. "Cyprus Avenue"; 5. "The Way Young Lovers Do"; 6. "Madame George"; 7. "Ballerina"; 8. "Slim Slow Slider"

Official audio"Cyprus Avenue" (1999 remaster) on YouTube

"Cyprus Avenue" is a song written by Northern Irish singer-songwriter Van Morrison and included on his 1968 album Astral Weeks. It refers to Cyprus Avenue, a residential street in Morrison's hometown of Belfast, Northern Ireland.

In performance the song was a concert highlight and closer for years to come and would end with Morrison's command, "It's too late to stop now!" (a quotation from his song "Into the Mystic") as he stalked from the stage. A dynamic 10-minute version with the usual stop-start ending was included on his 1974 live album It's Too Late to Stop Now.

== Recording and composition ==
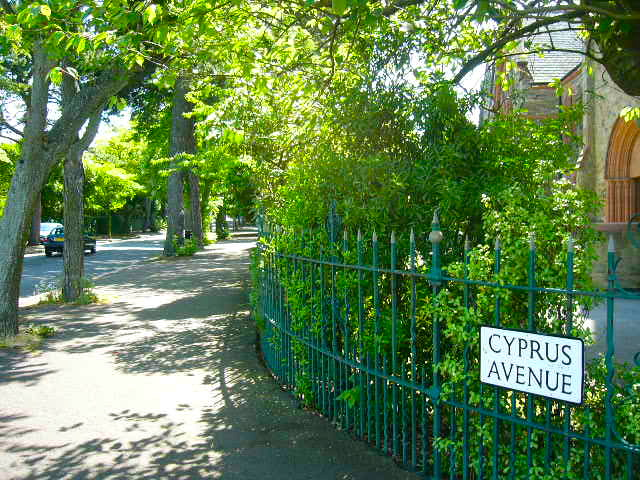
Cyprus Avenue – the street in Belfast that inspired the song.

Built on a basic blues structure with an unusual arrangement, the song was recorded at the Astral Weeks sessions on 25 September 1968, at Century Sound Studio with Lewis Merenstein as producer. The strings and harpsichord were overdubbed a month later.

Calling it the central song of the album, AllMusic described it as "a chamber-music hybrid of folk-blues, jazz, and classical music, and over it Morrison sings a meditative memory lyric about his adolescence in Belfast, Northern Ireland." On the Astral Weeks recording, Morrison's vocals are backed by his acoustic guitar, Richard Davis on acoustic bass and Larry Fallon on harpsichord, along with flute and strings.

According to Roy Kane, who grew up with Morrison in Belfast, Cyprus Avenue "...was the street that we would all aspire to — the other side of the tracks ... the Beersbridge Road had the railway line cut across it; and our side of it was one side of the tracks and Cyprus Avenue was the other... there was an Italian shop up in Ballyhackamore, that's where all the young ones used to go of a Sunday... we used to walk up to the Sky Beam for an ice cream or a cup of mushy peas and vinegar... We used to take a short cut up Cyprus Avenue..."

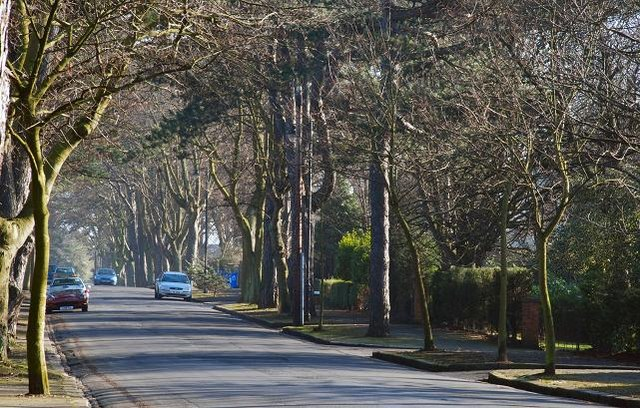
Another view of the street

Morrison told biographer Ritchie Yorke that along with "Madame George" (which references Cyprus Avenue in the opening line) the song came to him in "a stream of consciousness thing", "Both those songs just came right out. I didn't even think about what I was writing."

As journalist Matthew Collin described the song: "Morrison reminisced about a more innocent time, recounting the sights and sounds of a bygone life while escaping into his imagination, an oasis of romantic reverie." According to biographer Brian Hinton, "This is a song about being trapped, 'conquered in a car seat', and reduced to tortured silence, just like in (the song) 'T.B. Sheets'. The need for innocence in the earlier song is now equated to going crazy though the vision which then unfolds is out of time, and sexless. His dream lady in her antique carriage is only fourteen years old. Van's singing is totally possessed, moving from choked desire to exultation to hushed wonder."

== Live performances ==
Morrison often performed "Cyprus Avenue" in the 1970s, using it to close his concerts in many instances. Jon Landau wrote a Rolling Stone review in 1971 describing a performance at a concert he had attended: "For an encore Van offered 'Cyprus Avenue'. Working his way up to a ferocious conclusion, he stood before the audience shaking his head back and forth, hair falling about him, looking like a man insane. Finally, with tension mounting, he ran across the stage, ran back again, jumped over a microphone cord, held the mike up to his face and screamed, 'It’s too late to stop now', and was gone." The intense live performances were said to be "clearly influenced by James Brown's stage theatrics" and in turn "influenced Bruce Springsteen, who used similar dynamics with his E Street Band shows." A live version of it as performed in concert in the summer of 1973 is included on his 1974 live album It's Too Late to Stop Now. A live performance was again featured on Morrison's first video Van Morrison in Ireland, released in 1981. Forty years after it was first recorded, "Cyprus Avenue" was featured on Morrison's 2009 album Astral Weeks Live at the Hollywood Bowl. On this live album, the song was placed as the sixth song instead of the fourth with some new additions in content entitled "You Came Walking Down".

== Personnel ==
Musicians include:

- Van Morrison – vocals, acoustic guitar
- Richard Davis – double bass
- Larry Fallon – harpsichord, string arrangements
- John Payne - flute
- uncredited - violin

== Sources ==
- Heylin, Clinton (2003). Can You Feel the Silence? Van Morrison: A New Biography, Chicago Review Press, ISBN 1-55652-542-7
- Hinton, Brian (2000). Celtic Crossroads: The Art of Van Morrison. Sanctuary, ISBN 1-86074-169-X.
- Yorke, Ritchie (1975). Into The Music, London:Charisma Books, ISBN 0-85947-013-X
