= Live at Sin-é =

1993 EP by Jeff Buckley

EP (Live) by Jeff Buckley
- Released: November 23, 1993
- Recorded: July 19, 1993 and August 17, 1993
- Venues: Sin-é, New York City
- Genres: Alternative rock; jazz; blues
- Length: 26:31
- Label: Columbia
- Producers: Steve Berkowitz; Jeff Buckley

Jeff Buckley chronology
Live at Sin-é (1993)	Grace (1994)

Live at Sin-é is a live EP by the American singer-songwriter Jeff Buckley, released on November 23, 1993, on Columbia Records. It was Buckley's first commercial release. It features four songs performed by Buckley at the Sin-é cafe in the East Village, Manhattan. An expanded version with more than two hours of music was released in 2003.

== Background ==
Buckley moved from Los Angeles to New York City in 1991, and performed regularly at Sin-é, a cafe in the East Village, Manhattan. The cafe drew writers and musicians including Allen Ginsberg, Iggy Pop, Paul Simon and Edie Brickell. Buckley would perform long experimental sets with his Fender Telecaster, performing original material and covers of songs by various artists.

Buckley built a following and attracted attention from major record labels. In October 1992, he signed a record contract with Columbia Records. Rolling Stone said Live at Sin-é, Buckley's first commercial release, was designed to "shrewdly market a hot new performer's street cred".

== Content ==
Live at Sin-é comprises performances of "Mojo Pin" and "Eternal Life" (songs which later appeared on Buckley's 1994 album Grace), plus covers of the 1968 Van Morrison song "The Way Young Lovers Do" and the Édith Piaf song "Je N'en Connais Pas la Fin".

In 2003, Columbia released an expanded reissue, Live at Sin-é: (Legacy Edition). It contains more than two hours of additional music, including further songs from Grace, covers of songs by Morrison, Bob Dylan, Led Zeppelin, Nina Simone and Nusrat Fateh Ali Khan, and a cover of "Hallelujah" (1984) by Leonard Cohen.

== Reception ==
Professional ratings
Review scores
Source	Rating
AllMusic	4/5 stars
Entertainment Weekly	C+
Rolling Stone	4/5 stars
Slant Magazine	4.5/5 stars
Sputnikmusic	5.0/5

In Rolling Stone, Paul Evans wrote that "this is music vast in suggestiveness" and that Buckley's original songs were "unified by yearning and an honest passion that refuses to inhibit intelligence". A negative review in Newsday likened Buckley's voice to Michael Bolton and said he was derivative of "black idioms ... awkwardly reach[ing] for a balance of emotion and technique, eventually relying on sheer voice of will, oversinging, flaking out". Buckley was so upset by the review he stopped work on Grace for two days.

Reviewing the Legacy Edition for Rolling Stone in 2003, Karen Schoemer wrote: "It could be seen as an attempt to cash in on Buckley's tragic death in 1997, but it's too fascinating to be shrugged off." In the Sydney Morning Herald, Bernard Zuel wrote of the Legacy Edition that "there are times when you want him to shut up ... and times when musical excursions fall flat", but that the performances demonstrated "the power and grace that demanded attention ... you can't help but feel a shiver". In Pitchfork, Jeremy D. Larson wrote that "we hear possibility, someone so earnestly in love with the large-format spirit of music at time when Gen-X subversion laid like a choking fog over pop culture".

== Track listing ==
Original release
No.	Title	Writer(s)	Length
1.	"Mojo Pin"	Jeff Buckley, Gary Lucas	5:52
2.	"Eternal Life"	Jeff Buckley	5:43
3.	"Je n’en connais pas la fin"	Raymond Asso, Marguerite Monnot	5:00
4.	"The Way Young Lovers Do"	Van Morrison	10:02
Total length:			26:31

== Charts ==
=== Weekly charts ===
Weekly chart performance for Live at Sin-é
Chart (1993)	Peak position
French Albums (SNEP)	65
Irish Albums (IRMA)	58
Italian Albums (FIMI)	66
UK Albums (OCC)	101

=== Year-end charts ===
Year-end chart performance for Live at Sin-é
Chart (2001)	Position
Canadian (Nielsen SoundScan)	191
