= Sarah Jory =

English Country and Western musician

- Born: Sarah Elizabeth Jory; 20 November 1969 (age 56)
- Origin: Berkshire, England
- Occupation: Musician
- Years active: 1978–present
- Label: Various

Sarah Jory (born Sarah Elizabeth Jory; 20 November 1969 in Reading, Berkshire, England) is an English musician and vocalist.

== Early life ==
Sarah Jory began to learn to play musical instruments at the age of five when she obtained her first steel guitar.

In 1978, she was backed by the group Poacher when she was featured on the BBC Radio 2's Live from Golder's. Also at the age of nine, she joined the band Colorado Country after her father, Arthur Jory, secured her an audition. Jory played with the band for four years while completing her schooling. During this time, the band changed their name to Sarah and the Colorado Country. Jory's first album, Sarah's Steel Line, which she recorded with the band Poacher, was released by Crow Records in 1980, when she was eleven years old. After the album's release, she was asked to play at the Peterborough Festival of Music, having appeared earlier at Neil Coppendale's British Country Music Festival at the Brighton Centre.

At thirteen, Jory first visited the United States of America where she played at the Steel Guitar Convention in St. Louis with Buddy Emmons.

== Musical career and honours ==
From 1984 to 1992, Jory played thirteen steel guitar conventions in the US, appearing with Buddy Emmons, Lloyd Green and Paul Franklin and worked with Ricky Skaggs, Porter Wagoner and Gene Watson.

In 1985, the British Country Music Association voted Jory "The Most Promising New Act", followed by being voted the "Female Vocalist of the Year" for nine consecutive years by the BCMA. She also was voted "European Country Rock Entertainer of the Year". In 1995, 1996 and 1997, BCMA also voted her "British Female Vocalist of the Year".

In 1988, Jory worked in Bristol and formed her own professional band, opening for Eric Clapton in Dublin, among others and toured with Glen Campbell.

Jory played with the Van Morrison band during 2006 and 2009 and performed on his albums Keep It Simple and Astral Weeks Live at the Hollywood Bowl and on the DVD Astral Weeks Live at the Hollywood Bowl: The Concert Film.

In 2009, she performed with the group Essence of Ireland.

== Discography ==
- Sarah's Steel Line (LP 1980)
- Sarah on Steel (LP 1984)
- Cross Country (LP 1985)
- The Way To Survive (LP 1987)
- Deep in the Heart of Texas (CD 1988)
- Wind Beneath My Wings (EP 1988)
- No Time at All (LP 1988)
- Dallas City Lights (CD 1989)
- Sarah's Dream (CD 1990)
- Especially For You (LP 1990)
- New Rising Star (Video 1990)
- New Horizons (CD 1992)
- Never Had It So Good (SCD 1992)
- The Early Years 20 Steel Guitar Favourites (CD 1993)
- The Early Years 20 Classic Songs (CD 1993)
- Daniel O'Donnel & Friends Live (Comp. Video 1993)
- An Evening With Sarah (Video 1993)
- Web of Love (CD 1994)
- The Best of Country And Irish (Comp. CD 1994)
- Web of Love (SCD 1994)
- Web of Love (MC 1994)
- When You Walk in the Room (MC 1994)
- Love With Attitude (CD 1995)
- The Winners (Comp. CD 1995)
- Love With Attitude (MC 1995)
- If I Love You (SCD 1995)
- If I Had Any Pride Left at All (SCD 1995)
- When Promises Made Are Promises Kept (SCD 1995)
- Kiss My Innocence (CD 1998)
- Country Love Vol. 1 (Comp. CD 1995)
- The Best of Country And Irish Live (Comp DVD 1999)
- Rhythm in the Rain (SCD 1999)
- Always The Same in Love (SCD 1999)
- Always The Same in Love (Video 1999)
- The Sarah Jory Band Live! (CD 2000)
- What I Really Meant To Say (CD 2003)
- Steelin' From The Blue Room (CD 2004)

Appearances with other artists:

- The Dean Brothers – Same Train Different Track (SCD 1995)
- Claire Gaynor – Devotion (CD 2000)
- Elkie Brooks – Live with Friends (CD 2006)
- Riem de Wolff – Back On Track (CD 2006)
- Bob The Builder – Built To Be Wild (DVD 2006)
- Elkie Brooks & Friends – Pearls (DVD 2006)
- Lucie Diamond – Kilimanjaro (SCD 2006)
- Alan West – Songs From A Neophyte (CD 2007)
- Chris Farlow – Hotel Eingang (CD 2008)
- Van Morrison – Keep It Simple (CD 2008)
- Nathan Carter – On The Road (CD 2008)
- Van Morrison – Astral Weeks: Live at the Hollywood Bowl (CD 2009)
- Van Morrison – Astral Weeks: Live at the Hollywood Bowl (DVD 2009)
- Mark Travis – Mother (SCD 2009)
