= Wavelength (song) =

Single by Van Morrison

from the album Wavelength
- B-side: "Checkin' It Out"
- Released: September 1978
- Recorded: Spring 1978
- Studio: Shangri-La, Malibu, California
- Genre: Pop rock
- Length: 5:44
- Label: Warner Bros.
- Songwriter: Van Morrison
- Producer: Van Morrison

Van Morrison singles chronology
"Moondance" (1977)	"Wavelength" (1978)	"Natalia" (1979)

Audio sample
- file; help

"Wavelength" is the title song from the 1978 album by Northern Irish singer-songwriter Van Morrison. Released as a single in 1978, it climbed to number forty-two in the US charts, and stayed in the Hot 100 for eleven weeks. According to Howard A. Dewitt, this "was the song which re-established Morrison's hit making abilities".

== Recording and composition ==
"Wavelength" was recorded in spring 1978 at the Shangri-La Studios in Malibu, California.

The most important contribution to the music was made by Peter Bardens who played synthesizer.

In his biography, Brian Hinton states that it is, "a love song about the mysterious and unspoken communication between a couple" and also refers to the singer's adolescent years when he would listen to the Voice of America and the sounds of his favourite artists such as Ray Charles singing "Come back baby, come back". In the song Morrison refers to his first solo hit single "Brown Eyed Girl", using the lyrics "Won't you play that song again for me, about my lover, my lover in the grass".

The Allmusic reviewer wrote that, "'Wavelength' makes some nods to its era (1978), most notably and obviously via the use of fat 1970s synthesizers—played by Peter Bardens—which play spacy loops that mimic the interference and bubbling feedback one gets when dialing up shortwave radio stations. It is a little bit of cleverness, as Morrison elicits the same feelings on his own recording that he no doubt had discovering his favorite new music."

== Live performances ==
As performed by the Wavelength band on tour, it was a very popular song. Morrison assembled the band to promote his album, Wavelength that was released at the same time.

== Acclaim ==
Record World said that "Morrison's classic jazz/rock style is particularly effective" on this song.

"Wavelength" was rated at No. 253 in Dave Marsh's 1989 book The Heart of Rock and Soul, The 1001 Greatest Singles Ever.

== Other releases ==
"Wavelength" was the opening track on the Live at Montreux 1980/1974 DVD released in 2006. It is one of the songs remastered in 2007 and included on the compilation album Still on Top - The Greatest Hits. It was also performed in 1979, on Morrison's first video Van Morrison in Ireland, which was released in 1981.

== Personnel ==
- Van Morrison – vocals, acoustic guitar, alto saxophone
- Peter Bardens – synthesizer, piano, organ,
- Bobby Tench – electric guitar, backing vocals,
- Mickey Feat – bass guitar
- Peter Van Hooke – drums
- Ginger Blake – backing vocals
- Laura Creamer – backing vocals
- Linda Dillard – backing vocals
