= Tears in the Fence =

British literary journal

Tears in the Fence #32 2002 Summer Issue.

Tears in the Fence is a triannual British literary journal edited by David Caddy. It has been characterized as "a forward-looking magazine that is not afraid to take risks.... [and that] represents the cutting edge of modern poetry."

== Background ==
English poet and writer David Caddy and Harry Seccombe founded Tears in the Fence in November 1984, as a literary magazine for the Green Movement. Sarah Hopkins, who was also Literary Editor of Spare Rib at that time and co-author of Greenham Common: Women at the Wire (Women's Press, 1984), soon joined them. It is widely recognised as an internationally flavoured literary magazine of distinction, with editorial contributors in the United States, Paris, France and Melbourne, Australia. Regular columnists include David Caddy, Sarah Hopkins, Tom Chivers, Jennifer K. Dick, Kat Peddie, Morag Kiziewicz and Ian Brinton.

Beginning from an ecological and feminist perspective, the magazine deepened and developed its thinking on this path. It rapidly built upon its early internationalist outlook and international following. It was the first U.K. magazine to publish American poets and writers, such as Sheila E. Murphy, Gerald Locklin, Ed Ochester, Donna Hilbert, Fred Voss, as well as regularly publishing Edward Field and Paul Violi.

Regular contributors include poets associated with the British Poetry Revival including Lee Harwood, Iain Sinclair, Bill Griffiths, John James, Jeremy Reed, Barry MacSweeney, Peter Riley, and associate editor, Brian Hinton. Regular reviewers include Andrew Duncan, Steve Spence, Mandy Pannett, Norman Jope, Jeremy Hilton, Sheila Hamilton, Isobel Armstrong, Lesley Saunders, Fiona Owen, John Freeman, Mary Woodward, Nathaniel Tarn, Ian Seed, John Welch, Rosie Jackson, Robert Sheppard, Ric Hool, Frances Spurrier, Richard Forman, Peter Hughes and Ian Brinton.
