= Beside You (Van Morrison song) =

Song by Van Morrison

from the album Astral Weeks
- Released: November 1968
- Recorded: 25 September 1968
- Studio: Century Sound, New York City
- Genre: Folk rock
- Length: 5:10
- Label: Warner Bros.
- Songwriter(s): Van Morrison
- Producer(s): Lewis Merenstein

Astral Weeks track listing
- 8 tracks: 1. "Astral Weeks"; 2. "Beside You"; 3. "Sweet Thing"; 4. "Cyprus Avenue"; 5. "The Way Young Lovers Do"; 6. "Madame George"; 7. "Ballerina"; 8. "Slim Slow Slider"

"Beside You" is the second track on Astral Weeks, the 1968 album by Northern Irish singer-songwriter Van Morrison and released by Warner Bros. Records.

== Recording and composition ==
The song was recorded during the first Astral Weeks recording session at Century Sound Studios in New York City on 25 September 1968 with Lewis Merenstein as producer.

Van Morrison remarked on this song: "'Beside You' is the kind of song that you'd sing to a kid or somebody you love. It's basically a love song, just a song about being spiritually beside somebody." The child that would have inspired the song was his adopted son by Janet, his wife at that time. It is sung with a "hushed wonder" and in it the singer transfers the visions of his own childhood to his son.

Jack Lynch wrote in 1983:

The opening image of Little Jimmy shows a child sneaking out of his home, escaping to adventure and a childlike ritual rendezvous. Broken Arrow, possibly his fantasy figure, beckons – innocence led by imagination on the road to experience.

== Acclaim ==
Singer-songwriter Elvis Costello has identified this song as one of his favourites, featuring on one of his 500 favourite albums. Robert Pattinson of Twilight fame, when asked in an interview what his favourite song was, replied that it was "Beside You".

== Appearance on other albums ==
"Beside You" was featured on Morrison's album Astral Weeks Live at the Hollywood Bowl, released in 2009 to celebrate forty years since Astral Weeks was first released.

An alternate version of "Beside You" (6:05) appears on the album Bang Masters (recorded in 1967, released in 1991), featuring Van Morrison on electric guitar rather than an acoustic. An electric guitar version of this song also appears on The Authorized Bang Collection (released in 2017), listed as "Beside You (Take 5)."

== Covers ==
- Cara Robinson
- Australian blues and root band The Revelators covered the song on their 2000 album, The Adventures of The Amazing Revelators.

== Personnel ==
- Van Morrison – vocals, acoustic guitar
- Jay Berliner – classical guitar
- Richard Davis – double bass
- Anonymous – flute
- Warren Smith, Jr. – vibraphone

== Sources ==
- Heylin, Clinton (2003). Can You Feel the Silence? Van Morrison: A New Biography, Chicago Review Press ISBN 1-55652-542-7
- Hinton, Brian (1997). Celtic Crossroads: The Art of Van Morrison, Sanctuary, ISBN 1-86074-169-X
