= Common One =

Studio album by Van Morrison
- Released: August 1980
- Recorded: 11–19 February 1980
- Studio: Super Bear Studios
- Genres: R&B; jazz
- Length: 55:01
- Labels: Mercury (UK); Warner Bros. (US); Polydor (1989 & 2008 reissues)
- Producer: Van Morrison

Van Morrison chronology
Into the Music (1979)	Common One (1980)	Beautiful Vision (1982)

Common One is the twelfth studio album by Northern Irish singer-songwriter Van Morrison, released in 1980. The album was recorded over a nine-day period at Super Bear Studios, near Nice, on the French Riviera. Its title is in the lyrics of the song "Summertime in England": "Oh, my common one with the coat so old and the light in her head".

The 2008 re-issued and re-mastered version of the album contains alternate takes of "Haunts of Ancient Peace" and "When Heart Is Open".

Apart from polarising critics on its initial release, Common One has been cited by Morrison himself as his favourite of his own albums.

== Recording ==
According to Mick Cox the early stages of the album were rehearsed during November and December 1979. The songs "Summertime in England" and "Haunts of Ancient Peace" were rehearsed by Morrison and the band during small gigs in January 1980. Cox thought that "some of these performances at the rehearsals were far better than the final recordings." Speaking of the recording sessions at Super Bear, Cox said: "We were all ensconced in a very, very intense, highly charged situation for those eleven days, but it did bring out that album." Jef Labes recalled about his arrangements on the album: "... but what I always tried to do with string arrangements for him was to just try to mimic what he was singing, 'cause he was such a song instrument."

== Composition ==
In contrast to many of his previous albums, Common One ventures more into the realms of free jazz than the usual Van Morrison R&B, with the sax playing of Pee Wee Ellis coming to the fore. The songs are also somewhat longer than on his previous albums. Morrison said that the original concept was even more esoteric and was heavily influenced by his reading of nature poets.

The opening track, "Haunts of Ancient Peace" was named from a (1902) book by Alfred Austin (Poet Laureate 1896–1912), and features the twin brothers of Morrison's voice against the answering saxophone of Pee Wee Ellis, with the trumpet of Mark Isham.

"Summertime in England" was the longest track and proved to be a successful live performance for some time to come. Morrison said it "was actually a part of a poem I was writing and the poem and the song sort of merged." The lyrics include images of Wordsworth and Coleridge "smokin' up in Kendal" (Brian Hinton says they are "smokin' with poetry not spliffs"). It ends with the music being brought down to nothing and the words, "Can you feel the silence?"

"Spirit" played with sudden tempo changes and the ending fifteen-minute track, "When Heart Is Open", was experimental in form with elements of melody from Miles Davis's In A Silent Way. It is free tempo (presaging the era of New-age music).

== Reception ==
Professional ratings
Review scores
Source	Rating
AllMusic	3/5 stars
Billboard	(favourable)
Chicago Sun Times	3/4 stars
Christgau's Record Guide: The '80s	B−
Q	3/5 stars
The Rolling Stone Album Guide	2/5 stars

Critical response to Common One was divided. Graham Locke reviewed it in NME calling it "colossally smug and cosmically dull; an interminable, vacuous and drearily egotistical stab at spirituality". Dave McCullough wrote in Sounds: "For the fan, as I am myself, it's not even possible to romanticize and say that Morrison has lost his way temporarily, so stern and so acute is his departure." Rolling Stone critic Tom Carson named "Satisfied" as the record's only "masterpiece", in which "the simplicity that Morrison is striving for arrive as something natural and effortless, as a gift of grace". Clinton Heylin contends that Morrison was bruised by the reaction and "would not attempt anything quite so ambitious again."

In 1982, Lester Bangs argued for a reassessment, saying, "Van was making holy music even though he thought he was, and us rock critics had made our usual mistake of paying too much attention to the lyrics." Also in 1982, The Boston Phoenix's John Piccarella wrote that "Common One was probably Morrison’s richest record (rich like haute cuisine), brighter and sunnier than predecessors Astral Weeks and Veedon Fleece, lusher and elevated far above most people’s tolerance for elated sentiment. American critics voted it the 27th best album of 1980 in The Village Voice's annual Pazz & Jop poll. In an accompanying essay, poll supervisor Robert Christgau wrote, "As somebody who considers Moondance an apotheosis and has never gotten Astral Weeks, I think this is his worst since Hard Nose the Highway – sententious, torpid, abandoned by God. I know lots of Astral Weeks fans who agree. But Morrison has a direct line to certain souls, and they still hear him talkin'." In retrospect, he deemed "Satisfied" and "Summertime in England" to be the record's highlights.

In 2009, Erik Hage said "the dominant critical reaction represented it as prohibitive, sententious, and inaccessible, when in fact it is filled with much melody and beauty." AllMusic later wrote, "No wonder the rock critics of the time didn't get it; this is music outside the pop mainstream, and even Morrison's own earlier musical territory. But it retains its trancelike power to this day." In a 2014 list by Stereogum, ranking all the thirty-two solo Van Morrison albums from worst to best, Common One was placed in the sixteenth position.

== Track listing ==
All songs written by Van Morrison.

Side one
No.	Title	Length
1.	"Haunts of Ancient Peace"	7:07
2.	"Summertime in England"	15:35
3.	"Satisfied"	6:01

Side two
No.	Title	Length
1.	"Wild Honey"	5:49
2.	"Spirit"	5:10
3.	"When Heart Is Open"	15:05

Bonus tracks (2008 CD reissue)
No.	Title	Length
7.	"Haunts of Ancient Peace" (Alternate Take)	7:44
8.	"When Heart Is Open" (Alternate Take)	7:43

== Personnel ==
Musicians

- Van Morrison – vocals, guitar, harmonica
- Mick Cox – lead guitar
- Herbie Armstrong – guitar, backing vocals
- David Hayes – bass guitar, backing vocals
- John Allair – Hammond organ, piano, Fender Rhodes, backing vocals
- Pee Wee Ellis – tenor saxophone, alto saxophone, flute
- Mark Isham – trumpet, flugelhorn
- Pete Brewis – backing vocals on "Satisfied" with the band
- Peter Van Hooke – drums

2008 Reissue

- Toni Marcus – sitar, violin
- Mark Jordan – keyboards

Production

- Producer: Van Morrison with Henry Lewy for Caledonia Productions
- Musical Director: Pee Wee Ellis
- Horn Arrangement: Pee Wee Ellis
- String and Choir Arrangement: Jef Labes on "Summertime", "Wild Honey" and choir on "Haunts"
- Engineers: Henry Lewy, Dave Burgess, Alex Kash, and Chris Martyn
- Photography: Rudy Legname
- Mastered by Bernie Grundman at A&M Studios

== Charts ==
Chart (1980)	Position
Australia (Kent Music Report)	40
US Pop Albums	73
UK Album Chart	53
