= Slim Slow Slider =

Song by Van Morrison

from the album Astral Weeks
- Released: November 1968
- Recorded: 15 October 1968
- Studio: Century Sound, New York City
- Genre: Folk rock
- Length: 3:20
- Label: Warner Bros.
- Songwriter(s): Van Morrison
- Producer(s): Lewis Merenstein

Astral Weeks track listing
- 8 tracks: 1. "Astral Weeks"; 2. "Beside You"; 3. "Sweet Thing"; 4. "Cyprus Avenue"; 5. "The Way Young Lovers Do"; 6. "Madame George"; 7. "Ballerina"; 8. "Slim Slow Slider"

"Slim Slow Slider" is the closing track on the 1968 album Astral Weeks by Northern Irish singer-songwriter Van Morrison.

== Recording and composition ==
As the final song on the album, "Slim Slow Slider" was also the last song recorded on the final session on 15 October 1968, at Century Sound Studios in New York City with Lewis Merenstein as producer. John Payne, who played soprano saxophone on this song, says there was a long section at the end of this song that was cut off. "It was five to ten minutes of instrumental jamming, semi-baroque and jazz stuff."

In Morrison's words, the subject of this song is "a person who is caught up in a big city like London or maybe is on dope." Brian Hinton describes it as being an intrusion between the two poles of Belfast and America in the other songs. "The craziness of "Cyprus Avenue" has come home, so that the streets of Notting Hill become 'some sandy beach', in the junkies eyes....We are back in the world of "T.B. Sheets", and a twelve bar blues, and Van's chuckle is truly nasty. After all those rebirths, here is a song about winter, "white as snow", and death..." The song ends abruptly with Van slapping on the side of his guitar.

== Other releases ==
"Slim Slow Slider" was also featured on Morrison's 2009 album Astral Weeks Live at the Hollywood Bowl, recorded forty years after the classic album Astral Weeks was first released. Morrison changed the song's placement on this album to the third song instead of the final song, adding also to the length and content, entitling the new addition "I Start Breaking Down".

== Personnel ==
- Van Morrison – vocals, acoustic guitar
- Richard Davis – double bass
- John Payne – soprano saxophone
- Warren Smith, Jr. – percussion

== Covers ==
Johnny Rivers named his 1970 album Slim Slo Slider and included two versions of the song. Tom McShane performed a live version of the song.

It was among the acoustic covers recorded by Peter Laughner in his bedroom on the night he died, which were later collectively released as The Last Recordings.
