= Summertime in England =

- "Cry for Home" single cover

Single by Van Morrison

from the album Common One
- A-side: "Cry for Home"
- B-side: "Summertime in England" (Live)
- Released: February 1983
- Genre: Jazz, R&B
- Length: 15:39
- Label: Mercury
- Songwriter: Van Morrison
- Producer: Van Morrison

"Summertime in England" is the longest song on Northern Irish singer-songwriter Van Morrison's 1980 album, Common One, and is approximately fifteen minutes long. Although the album on which the song appeared was not critically or commercially successful, the song would be performed by Morrison in concert for almost two and one-half decades, taking on new meaning when performed live. A truncated version of the song with an early fade-out was also released as the B-side of the 1983 single "Cry for Home".

== Recording and composition ==
Morrison started rehearsing "Summertime in England" in November and December 1979 along with "Haunts of Ancient Peace" at club gigs in the San Francisco area. According to Mick Cox, guitarist, "we did 'Haunts' and 'Summertime in England' in 4/4 time...Van brought it right down at the end to nothing, so he's just saying, 'Can you feel the Silence?' but he's still keeping the beat, and then Pee Wee Ellis takes his mouthpiece off and Mark Isham takes his mouthpiece off, and they're both making quiet percussive noises in time to the rhythm." Cox felt like the rehearsal performances were "far better than the final recordings." The song on the album was recorded at Super Bear Studios in the French Alps in February 1980 and according to Mick Cox the second take was the one used on the album. The spoken section is in 3/4 time that begins with John Allair's church organ solo.

Morrison originally wrote the song as a poem about William Wordsworth and Samuel Taylor Coleridge making a literary trip to the Lake District in England where they worked together on the poems that were to become their landmark joint venture, Lyrical Ballads. He also references some Irish writers, noting, as if from a national encyclopedia, "Yeats and Lady Gregory corresponded, corresponded, corresponded/And James Joyce wrote streams of consciousness books." Morrison has been quoted as saying, "['Summertime in England'] was actually part of a poem I was writing, and the poem and the song sorta merged... I'd read several articles about this particular group of poets who were writing about this particular thing, which I couldn't find in the framework I was in."

The lyrics also refer to Jesus walking down by Avalon — an allusion by William Blake with the lines: "And did these feet in ancient time/Walk upon England's mountain green?" The lyrics verge between several layers of consciousness but always return to the central occurrence of a holiday in the country that the singer spent with his sweetheart (the "red-robed" Toni Marcus) and/or daughter. The song ends with the lines:

Put your head on my shoulder
and you listen to the silence
Can you feel the silence?

Biographer Brian Hinton believes "The song leaves most classical rock fusions dead in the water."

In an essay in 2000, Allen B. Ruch wrote that "the music is supported by a wonderful string section that completely avoids the treacle that strings can sometimes lend to songs like this. And as usual with Van Morrison's lyrics, passages that seem awkward or even silly on paper take on a soaring and majestical intensity when sung by Van in their proper place."

== Personnel ==
- Van Morrison – vocals
- David Hayes – bass
- Mark Isham – trumpet
- John Allair – organ
- Herbie Armstrong – guitar
- Pee Wee Ellis – tenor saxophone
- Mick Cox – guitar
- Peter Van Hooke – drums

== Other releases ==
A live performance of "Summertime in England" as performed by Morrison with most of the Common One band members is featured on the 2006 released DVD, Live at Montreux 1980/1974. A live version was recorded during concerts at the Grand Opera House in Belfast and released as the B-side of a 12 inch single released in February 1983 on the Mercury label. It is also one of the songs performed in 1989, on Morrison's second video Van Morrison The Concert, released in 1990.
