= Astral Weeks =

1968 studio album by Van Morrison

Studio album by Van Morrison
- Released: 29 November 1968
- Recorded: 25 September 1968, 1 and 15 October 1968
- Studios: Century Sound, New York City
- Genres: Folk rock; folk jazz; progressive folk; blue-eyed soul
- Length: 47:10
- Label: Warner Bros.
- Producer: Lewis Merenstein

Van Morrison chronology
Blowin' Your Mind! (1967)	Astral Weeks (1968)	Moondance (1970)

Astral Weeks is the second studio album by Northern Irish singer-songwriter Van Morrison. It was recorded at Century Sound Studios in New York during September and October 1968 and released in November of the same year by Warner Bros. Records.

The album's music blends folk, blues, jazz, and classical styles, a radical departure from Morrison's previous pop hits, such as "Brown Eyed Girl" (1967). The lyrics and cover art portray the symbolism equating earthly love and heaven that would often feature in the singer's subsequent records. His lyrics have been described as impressionistic, hypnotic, and modernist, while the record has been categorized as a song cycle or concept album.

Astral Weeks did not originally receive promotion from Morrison's record label and was not an immediate success with consumers or critics. Its standing eventually improved greatly, with praise given to Morrison's singing, arrangements, and songwriting, and the album has been viewed as one of rock music's greatest and most important records (a reputation the singer himself has dismissed). It was placed on numerous widely circulated lists of the best albums of all time and has had an enduring effect on both listeners and musicians.

Forty years after the album's release, Morrison performed all eight of its songs live for the first time at two Hollywood Bowl concerts in November 2008; this performance was later released as Astral Weeks Live at the Hollywood Bowl.

== Background ==
At the beginning of 1968, Van Morrison became involved in a contract dispute with Bang Records that kept him away from any recording activity. This occurred after the sudden death of the label's founder Bert Berns. Born with a congenital heart defect, Berns had a fatal heart attack and was discovered dead in a New York hotel room on 30 December 1967. Prior to Berns's death, he and Morrison had experienced some creative difficulties; Berns had been pushing Morrison in a more pop-oriented direction, while Morrison wanted to explore newer musical terrain. Berns's widow, Ilene Berns, held Morrison and this conflict responsible for her husband's death. Years later she would downplay this scenario, but Morrison's then girlfriend Janet (Planet) Rigsbee has since gone on record describing Ilene Berns's subsequent vindictiveness towards Morrison.

Following Bert Berns's death, Ilene Berns inherited the contracts of Bang Records. Morrison's annual option on his recording contract was also due less than a week after Berns's funeral. Legally bound to Bang Records, Morrison was not only kept out of the studio, but also found himself unable to find performing work in New York as most clubs refrained from booking him, fearing reprisals. (Bert Berns was notorious for his connections to organized crime and those connections still affected artists like Morrison and Neil Diamond trying to leave Bang Records, even after Berns's death.) Ilene Berns then discovered that her late husband had previously been remiss in filing the appropriate paperwork to keep Morrison (still a British citizen) in New York and contacted Immigration and Naturalization Service in an attempt to have Morrison deported. However, Morrison managed to stay in the U.S. when Janet Rigsbee agreed to marry him. Once married, Morrison and Rigsbee moved to Cambridge, Massachusetts, where he found work performing in local clubs. Morrison began performing with a small electric combo doing blues numbers and songs from Blowin' Your Mind! and from Morrison's Them band days. Two of the musicians soon left but Morrison retained the bassist, Tom Kielbania, a student at the Berklee School of Music. Morrison decided to try an acoustic sound and he and Kielbania began performing shows in coffee houses in the Boston area as an acoustic duo with Morrison playing guitar and Kielbania on upright bass. Before this, Morrison had primarily recorded and performed with electric musicians. The acoustic medium would provide him "greater vocal improvisation and a freer, folkier feel".

Later, Kielbania heard jazz-trained flautist John Payne for the first time while sitting in on a jam session. He invited Payne to the club where he played with Morrison, hoping Morrison would invite him to join them. After allowing Payne to sit in on one performance, Morrison extended an invitation, which Payne accepted. The trio of Payne, Kielbania and Morrison continued performing for four months. In the weeks they played at the Catacombs, they began to develop the template for Astral Weeks. It was around this time that Warner Bros. Records approached Morrison, hoping to sign him. Presumably, their interest focused on his prior success with "Brown-Eyed Girl", not on Morrison's current acoustic work. Regardless, their interest allowed Morrison to return to the recording studio.

At the time, Warner Bros. had a deal with Inherit Productions, the production arm of Schwaid-Merenstein, which was founded by manager Bob Schwaid (who worked for Warners Publishing) and producer Lewis Merenstein. Merenstein received a call from Warner Bros. to see Morrison in Boston and related how eight or nine producers had gone to hear Morrison, thinking they were going to hear "Brown Eyed Girl" only to find that "it was another person with the same voice". Merenstein first heard Morrison play at Ace Recording studio and recalled that when Morrison played the song "Astral Weeks" for him, "I started crying. It just vibrated in my soul and I knew that I wanted to work with that sound." While Merenstein was visiting Morrison, Schwaid set to work on resolving Morrison's contractual troubles with the help of Warner Bros. executive Joe Smith, who would ultimately sign Morrison to Warner Bros.

Still legally bound to Bang Records, Morrison would yet have more issues with them in the future. For the time being, Schwaid managed to free him from those obligations, under several conditions. First, Morrison had to write and submit to Web IV Music (Bert Berns's publishing company) three original compositions per month over the course of one year. Morrison fulfilled that obligation by recording thirty-six nonsense songs in a single session. Such action risked legal reprisals, but ultimately none transpired. Morrison then had to assign Web IV half of the copyright to any musical composition written and recorded by Morrison and released as a single within one year from 12 September 1968. That demand became a moot point when Warner Bros. refrained from releasing any singles during that time, as no single was released from Astral Weeks. Finally, Morrison had to include two original compositions controlled by Web IV on his next album. Morrison fulfilled that demand with two of his own compositions, "Madame George" and "Beside You", although the versions subsequently released were vastly different musically from the original versions recorded with Bang.

There were still demands that weren't given on paper, which Smith tried to deal with through Don Rickles's manager, Joe Scandore. Scandore, whom Smith described as "connected", set up an unusual arrangement where Smith had to arrive one evening at an abandoned warehouse on 9th Avenue in Manhattan at 6 p.m. with a bag containing $20,000 USD in cash. According to Smith, "I had to walk up three flights of stairs and they were four guys. Two tall and thin and two built like buildings. There was no small talk. I got the signed contract and got the hell out of there, because I was afraid somebody would whack me in the head and take back the contract and I'd be out the money." When asked if he ever saw these men again, Smith replied, "No. They weren't in the music business."

== Recording sessions ==
With his legal matters resolved, Morrison now had the freedom to proceed with recording his Warner Bros. debut album, with the recording sessions taking place at the Century Sound Studios in New York on 25 September, 1 and 15 October 1968. The live tracks for the sessions were performed by Morrison on vocals and acoustic guitar in a separate vocal booth with the other musicians playing together on upright bass, lead acoustic guitar, vibes, flute, and drums. The strings and horns constituted the only instruments added subsequently to the initial recording sessions. Morrison said later "They ruined it. They added strings. I didn't want the strings. And they sent it to me, it was all changed. That's not 'Astral Weeks'."

Producer Lewis Merenstein had a background in jazz, and according to Merenstein, Morrison "was not an aficionado of jazz when I met him. R&B and soul, yes; but jazz, no." For the Astral Weeks recording sessions, Merenstein first contacted veteran bassist Richard Davis. Perhaps best known for his work with Eric Dolphy, Davis essentially served as the session leader, and it was through Davis that Merenstein recruited guitarist Jay Berliner, percussionist Warren Smith Jr., and drummer Connie Kay. All of these musicians had strong backgrounds in jazz; Berliner had worked closely with Charles Mingus and Kay was part of the Modern Jazz Quartet. Morrison was still working with Kielbania and Payne but, for these sessions, they were essentially replaced. According to Kielbania, "I got to show all the bass lines to Richard Davis. He embellished a lot of them, but I gave him the feeling."

Davis proved, perhaps, to be the most pivotal instrumentalist during these sessions. "If you listen to the album, every tune is led by Richard and everybody followed Richard and Van's voice", says Merenstein. "I knew if I brought Richard in, he would put the bottom on to support what Van wanted to do vocally, or acoustically. Then you get Jay playing those beautiful counter-lines to Van." Davis was not impressed by Morrison, not out of disdain or any preconceived notions, but rather because Morrison's professional comportment generally did not meet Davis's expectations. "No prep, no meeting", recalls Davis. "He was remote from us, 'cause he came in and went into a booth ... And that's where he stayed, isolated in a booth. I don't think he ever introduced himself to us, nor we to him ... And he seemed very shy". Drummer Connie Kay later told Rolling Stone that he approached Morrison and asked "what he wanted me to play, and he said to play whatever I felt like playing. We more or less sat there and jammed." Morrison's impression of the sessions was "The songs came together very well in the studio. Some of the tracks were first takes. [But] the musicians were really together. Those type of guys play what you're gonna do before you do it, that's how good they are." He told Ritchie Yorke that only two tracks recorded during the sessions did not make it to the album. "One was about Jesse James and the other about trains. They were both just basic blues numbers. That's why they didn't fit in with the album."

You have to understand something, ... A lot of this ... there was no choice. I was totally broke. So I didn't have time to sit around pondering or thinking all this through. It was just done on a basic pure survival level. I did what I had to do.

— Van Morrison (2009)

For the Astral Weeks sessions, apparently they did not employ any lead sheets, or at least none were distributed to the musicians. "What stood out in my mind was the fact that he allowed us to stretch out", recalls Berliner. "We were used to playing to charts, but Van just played us the songs on his guitar and then told us to go ahead and play exactly what we felt." Berliner actually had great appreciation for the freedom given to him and the band; something few, if any, of them were used to. "I played a lot of classical guitar on those sessions and it was very unusual to play classical guitar in that context", says Berliner.

The first session, held in the evening on 25 September 1968, produced four recordings that made it to the album. Only three had initially been intended for inclusion: "Cyprus Avenue", "Madame George", and "Beside You". Although not scheduled to play, Payne still attended the first session and listened as another flautist played his parts. To this day, nobody recalls the name of this flautist, nor has he been identified on any of the surviving documentation; he does play flute on the released takes of "Beside You" and "Cyprus Avenue" but is not included in the album credits. When Morrison tried to squeeze in one last tune during the end of that first session, Payne spoke up and pleaded to Merenstein to permit him to participate. Payne was then allowed to play on what became the title track of the album – "Astral Weeks" – the fourth song produced from this initial session. For the remainder of the sessions, John Payne played on every song.

The next session, according to John Payne, occurred early in the morning, but it did not work and nothing from this session worked for the final album. "It just didn't happen" says Payne. "It was the wrong time of day for jazz musicians to create. I think that by the end of that session we all knew that nothing was going to be used. They just said, let's forget it." Jay Berliner was not available, so Barry Kornfeld was recruited to play lead guitar in his place. According to Merenstein, there was tension at this second session and it was stopped after about three hours. Morrison was quoted by Ritchie Yorke as saying the album was recorded in "two eight-hour sessions, plus two overdub sessions. That was the whole album." In his biography, Clinton Heylin gives the date for the second session as 1 October and states that "Only 'As Young Lovers Do' from this session would make the album" contending that this is the reason for the different "lounge-jazz sound" on this track. Other biographers have primarily noted that the early morning first of October session was abandoned without producing any of the songs on the album.

The third and final session, in the evening on 15 October, produced four more recordings that completed the album — "The Way Young Lovers Do" "Sweet Thing", "Ballerina" and "Slim Slow Slider". Davis expressed to Rolling Stone that there was a "certain feel about a seven-to-ten o'clock session" and that "the ambience of that time of day was all through everything we played". Both "Sweet Thing" and "Ballerina" were originally scheduled for the session, but the search for a 'closer' consumed a considerable amount of time. They attempted (and rejected) a number of songs until Morrison suggested "Slim Slow Slider". "I don't think we'd ever done [it] live", recalls Payne. "[Morrison] had a book full of songs ... I don't know why he decided to do it ... And we were first doing it with the drums, with Richard Davis and Connie Kay and the guitar player and the vibe player and me and Van — all of us were playing. Then I started playing soprano sax on the thing, and Lew said, 'OK, I wanna try it again. Start again. And I want just the bass, the soprano sax, and Van.'" It was a successful take, but it also came with a very long coda, prompting Merenstein to make a large cut during the editing process. Many of the tracks on Astral Weeks would be subjected to edits (mainly to tighten the performances), but the one on "Slim Slow Slider" was easily the most substantial. "I would estimate three, five minutes of instrumental stuff", says Payne. "We went through stages [until] we got to be avant-garde kind of weird, which is what you hear after the splice – all that weird stuff we're playing – but there was a whole progression to that." According to Merenstein, before he cut it, the coda "was a long, long ending that went nowhere, that just carried on from minute to minute ... If it had [some] relativity to the tune itself, I would have left it there."

The recording engineer for the album, Brooks Arthur, remembered the sessions in 2009: "A cloud came along, and it was called the Van Morrison sessions. We all hopped upon that cloud, and the cloud took us away for awhile [sic], and we made this album, and we landed when it was done." In a Rolling Stone interview in 1972, Morrison told John Grissim Jr.: "I was really pretty happy with the album. The only complaint I had was that it was rather rushed. But I thought it was closer to the type of music I wanted to put out. And still is, actually."

== Music and lyrics ==
It sounded like the man who made Astral Weeks was in terrible pain, pain most of Van Morrison's previous works had only suggested; but like the later albums by the Velvet Underground, there was a redemptive element in the blackness, ultimate compassion for the suffering of others, and a swath of pure beauty and mystical awe that cut right through the heart of the work.

— Lester Bangs, (1979)

Astral Weeks has poetic, stream-of-consciousness lyrics that evoke emotions and images instead of coherent, intellectual ideas and narratives. According to Guy Raz from NPR, it is a folk rock album, "perhaps the seminal album of the folk-rock genre", while the Rock and Roll Hall of Fame online biography of Morrison said its music is trance-like folk jazz set to "impressionistic, free-flowing" lyrics. AllMusic's William Ruhlmann, on the other hand, viewed the music as an amalgam of folk, blues, jazz, and classical music that is unlike rock.

Although usually described as a song cycle rather than a concept album, the songs do, when considered in their totality, seem to link together as one long song, forming an "intangible narrative of unreachable worlds" and delivered with what one writer calls "a masterpiece of virtuoso singing". According to Charlie Gillett, the album has meditative songs that combine themes of nostalgia, drama, and Morrison's personal mysticism and are performed in a blue-eyed soul style.

The album embraces a form of symbolism that would eventually become a staple of Morrison's songs, equating earthly love and heaven, or as close as a living being can approach it. Morrison and Davis's upright bass can be interpreted as the earth opposing Kay's percussion and the string arrangement representing heaven and with Berliner's lead acoustic guitar residing on a plane in between.

Van Morrison told Ritchie Yorke, one of his biographers, he wrote both of the songs "Madame George" and "Cyprus Avenue" in stream of consciousness: "['Madame George'] just came right out ... The song is just a stream of consciousness thing, as is 'Cyprus Avenue' ...I didn't even think about what I was writing."

In an interview with Paste in 2009, Morrison said the songs on Astral Weeks were written "prior to 1968 over a period of five years". In an NPR review he comments: "It's not about me. It's totally fictional. It's put together of composites, of conversations I heard—you know, things I saw in movies, newspapers, books, whatever. It comes out as stories. That's it. There's no more."

== Songs ==
=== Side One – In The Beginning ===
==== "Astral Weeks" ====
Astral Weeks
Sample from the title song featuring the opening lines of the album: "If I ventured in the slipstream between the viaducts of your dream".

The song "Astral Weeks" opens the album with the lines "If I ventured in the slipstream, between the viaducts of your dream/ Where immobile steel rims crack, and the ditch in the back roads stop", which according to Erik Hage shows that Morrison had "once and for all pulled neck and neck with Dylan as a lyricist". Morrison described it as "one of those songs where you can see the light at the end of the tunnel ... I don't think I can elaborate on it any more than that." The words in the song: "Talkin' to Huddie Ledbetter/Showin' pictures on the wall" appear to be based on Morrison's real life custom of carrying around a poster of Lead Belly and hanging it on the wall wherever he lived. (This was revealed in a Rolling Stone interview in 1978.)

==== "Beside You" ====
"Beside You", the second song on the album, has been described as "expressionistic poetry and a scattershot collection of images and scenarios". It begins with the classical guitar of Jay Berliner and Morrison's voice circling each other. Morrison described it as "the kind of song that you'd sing to a kid or somebody that you love. It's basically a love song. It's just a song about being spiritually beside somebody." It was originally recorded for Bang Records in December 1967. That first recording shows the pop music intentions of Bert Berns which give it a different sound from the Astral Weeks recording.

==== "Sweet Thing" ====
"Sweet Thing" is the only song on the album to look forward instead of backward. In the words of AllMusic: "Over the endlessly descending, circular progression, Morrison sings positive lyrics about nature and a romantic partner, seemingly beginning in the middle of a thought: 'And I will stroll the merry way.'" Paul Du Noyer wrote, "Sweet Thing puts the singer in a hazy, pastoral paradise where he wanders in 'gardens wet with rain', or counts the stars in his lover's eyes, and vows to 'never grow so old again' or 'read between the lines'. He pleads with his mind to keep quiet, so his heart can hear itself think. He yearns to obliterate experience and rediscover innocence." It has been a more popular cover song than any of the others on the album.

==== "Cyprus Avenue" ====
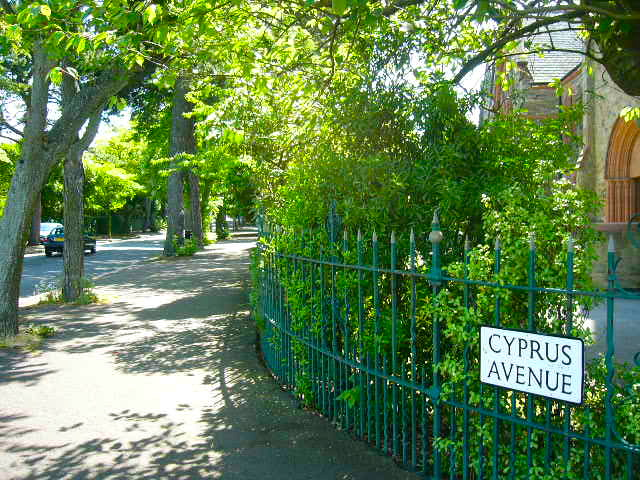
Cyprus Avenue – the street in Belfast that inspired the song.

The song "Cyprus Avenue" is a three chord blues composition and served for many years as the closing song for most of Morrison's live shows. Along with "Madame George", it is the centerpiece of the album and both songs are Belfast related and highly impressionistic. The song is told from the point of view of an outsider watching from inside an automobile and getting tongue-tied as the refined school girl he fantasizes about appears and he imagines her a fine lady with "rainbow ribbons in her hair" in a carriage drawn by six white horses and "returning from a fair". Van Morrison described Cyprus Avenue as "a street in Belfast, a place where there's a lot of wealth. It wasn't far from where I was brought up and it was a very different scene. To me it was a very mystical place. It was a whole avenue lined with trees and I found it a place where I could think."

"Astral Weeks" songs ... were from another sort of place—not what is at all obvious. They are poetry and mythical musings channeled from my imagination ... [They] are little poetic stories I made up and set to music. The album is about song craft for me—making things up and making them fit to a tune I have arranged. The songs were somewhat channeled works—that is why I called it "Astral Weeks". As my songwriting has gone on I tend to do the same channeling, so it's sort of like "Astral Decades", I guess.

— Van Morrison (2008)

=== Side Two – Afterwards ===
==== "The Way Young Lovers Do" ====
"The Way Young Lovers Do" is described by Clinton Heylin as a "lounge-jazz" sound that "still sticks out like Spumante at a champagne buffet". In his review for Rolling Stone, Greil Marcus also spoke of the song as a "poor jazz-flavored cut that, is uncomfortably out of place on this record". Brian Hinton describes it as there being "a Sinatra strut to Van's voice, a blues knowingness with Stax brass, and a string section which swirls where previously it drifted." He describes it as "about growing up, an adolescent first kiss".

==== "Madame George" ====
"Madame George" is almost ten minutes long and tells of the mysterious madame "in a corner playing dominoes in drag", among other things. It also has a setting of Cyprus Avenue in Belfast with impressionistic lyrics that give stream-of-conscious details that are seemingly unrelated. Erik Hage describes the effect of the sensory experience of the lyrics, the instrumentation and Morrison's impassioned vocals on the listener and the album as being "like some kind of twilight state between sleeping and wakefulness", engaging the listener to project themselves into the spell of the song. Rolling Stone's album reviewer wrote: "The crowning touch is 'Madame George', a cryptic character study that may or may not be about an aging transvestite but that is certainly as heartbreaking a reverie as you will find in pop music." Morrison has denied that the song is about a transvestite, as others, including Lester Bangs, have believed. The original title of the song was Madame Joy. Later, Morrison changed the title but sings the words Madame Joy in the song. An earlier recording for Bang Records with slightly altered lyrics, backing singers, a much swifter tempo and a "bizarrely inappropriate party atmosphere" had a considerably different tone from the 1968 Astral Weeks recording.

==== "Ballerina" ====
The oldest composition on Astral Weeks is "Ballerina", which Morrison composed in 1966 while still a member of Them, around the same time he first met his future wife, Janet. Inspired by "a flash about an actress in an opera house appearing in a ballet" (according to Morrison), former Them guitarist Jim Armstrong recalls the band working on the song between engagements. "[Morrison] had all these words", Armstrong says, "we sort of formalized it, 'cause there was no structure to it". Them performed the song one night in Hawaii, but it was not recorded until Astral Weeks. On the full-length version of "Ballerina" which first appeared on the 2015 expanded edition, the left and right audio channels are opposite to those on the originally released edited version.

==== "Slim Slow Slider" ====
"Slim Slow Slider" is the only song on the album to not have string overdubs and according to John Payne, Morrison had not played it live before. Like in the song "T.B. Sheets", the singer tells of watching a young girl die, but in "Slim Slow Slider" the girl seems bent on her own self-destruction: "I know you're dying, baby / I know you know it too." The song ends abruptly with the words, "Every time I see you, I just don't know what to do." It has been said to be about a drug addict, but Morrison has only said that it's about someone "who is caught up in a big city like London or maybe is on dope, I'm not sure."

== Packaging ==
According to Steve Turner, one of Van Morrison's biographers, Irish painter Cecil McCartney influenced the titling of Astral Weeks. Morrison related how "A friend of mine had drawings in his flat of astral projection. I was at his house when I was working on a song which began, 'If I venture down the slipstream' and that's why I called it 'Astral Weeks'." "It was a painting", McCartney corrects. "There were several paintings in the studio at the time. Van looked at the painting and it suggested astral travelling to him." The album cover photograph of Van Morrison was taken by Joel Brodsky, best known for his "Young Lions" photoshoot with Jim Morrison. The squared circle in the cover photo is described as portraying "the mystic symbol of the union of opposites; the sacred marriage of heaven and earth".

== Reception ==
Astral Weeks sold poorly when it was first released in 1968. The album became a somewhat popular cult import in the United States, while in the United Kingdom it was largely overlooked by critics. The British magazine Beat Instrumental published a negative review of the record, finding Morrison's songs monotonous and unoriginal. In NME, Nick Logan regarded it as a pale imitation of the guitarist José Feliciano's 1968 Feliciano! album, which was one of the year's best-selling records. With the exception of Astral Weeks' title track, Logan felt the compositions were indistinguishable and "suffer from being stuck in the same groove throughout". In the American magazine Stereo Review, editor Peter Reilly panned it as a "free-verse mind bender of an album", plagued by nonsensical lyrics and incoherent singing from Morrison, especially on "Madame George".

In December 1968, a week after the album's release, the Detroit Free Press published a positive review by Wilson Lindsey, who wrote that the album was "a rare and unexpected piece of recording art" that "explodes with joy or sorrow". Noting Morrison's abrupt shift away from his previous pop work, Lindsey said, "Forget everything that he has written in the past. Astral Weeks is different". In 1969, Greil Marcus reviewed the album positively in Rolling Stone, saying that Morrison's lyrics were thoughtful and deeply intellectual, "in terms of the myths and metaphors that exist within the world of rock and roll". He believed both the music and lyrics captured the spirit of Bob Dylan's 1967 album John Wesley Harding, while calling Astral Weeks a "unique and timeless" record. Rolling Stone later named it the album of the year. Melody Maker also called it one of the year's best records, featuring Morrison's "small harsh voice" backed by an attractive musical combo that "verges on genius" during "Madame George". When his third album Moondance was released in 1970, Warner Bros. ran full-page advertisements remarking on the unavailability of Astral Weeks in record stores, calling it a "damn shame" that it "ended up as what you might call a critically acclaimed but obscure album ... If you want it and can't find it, yell at the store's record buyer. Loud, because you're the customer and you're always right. Undo the veils of potential obscurity."

== Legacy and influence ==
Retrospective professional ratings
Review scores
Source	Rating
AllMusic	5/5 stars
Encyclopedia of Popular Music	5/5 stars
The Independent	5/5 stars
MusicHound Rock	5/5
Pitchfork	10/10
Rolling Stone	3/5 stars
The Rolling Stone Album Guide	5/5 stars
RTÉ	5/5 stars
Sputnikmusic	4.5/5
Tom Hull	A

Astral Weeks' critical standing improved greatly over time. It became viewed as one of rock's greatest records and a culturally significant work. Many factors afforded the record its strong reputation in rock criticism: its back story as a commercial underachiever and highly personal work for Morrison, its distinction from the rest of his discography, his artistic autonomy, the music's song cycle composition, the enigmatic lyrics and quality of seriousness and originality as perceived by mature rock audiences and writers. According to Rob Sheffield, it was Morrison's "most beautiful and intense album", the foundation for his "legend" and a work that continues to captivate musicians and listeners. Lester Bangs said its anguished feeling resonated with him on first listen, calling it "the rock record with the most significance in my life so far ... a record about people stunned by life, completely overwhelmed, stalled in their skins, their ages and selves, paralyzed by the enormity of what in one moment of vision they can comprehend." Irish musician Glen Hansard said it made him think about life with a greater depth of feeling, "with a greater sense of fear and horror and desire than you ever imagined." Colin Larkin credited Morrison for fully realizing his ambition to "create without pop's constraints" on Astral Weeks, while AllMusic's William Ruhlmann said its reputation among critics was justified because "unlike any record before or since", it "encompasses the passion and tenderness that have always mixed in the best postwar popular music".

Astral Weeks influenced future releases of other musicians such as Bono and Bruce Springsteen. Mike Ragogna with HuffPost wrote that Astral Weeks influenced Springsteen's 1973 first album Greetings from Asbury Park, N.J. and two of the songs from his second. Steven Van Zandt, from Springsteen's E Street Band, has said: "Astral Weeks was like a religion to us." According to writer Steve Turner, the album also became popular with travelers of the hippie trail, "from Europe through to Kathmandu and there were even reports of vans painted in psychedelic colours being renamed 'the Van Morrison'." In his 1975 book, Ritchie Yorke wrote "It was almost as if Van Morrison, elusive at any time, had deliberately created an album of music which would indefinitely withstand the vulgarity of music industry image-making. Later they might say that other albums were reminiscent of Astral Weeks, but they could never claim that Astral Weeks was like anything else." According to Greil Marcus, Martin Scorsese said that the first fifteen minutes of his 1976 film Taxi Driver was based on Astral Weeks.

Astral Weeks did not sell as an album, even still today. A lot of people like it, mostly musicians and other artists and writers etc. like it, but as an album, it didn't sell.

— Van Morrison (1979)

The critical recognition and renown of Astral Weeks came to overshadow Morrison's subsequent work, as well as Morrison himself. According to biographer Johnny Rogan, his recording career was "all too often crystallized in a single moment. Like the Beach Boys' Pet Sounds, Astral Weeks was perceived as a one-off whose critical standing allowed little discussion for other equally fascinating musical forays that followed." Morrison felt annoyed by the retrospective acclaim and claims about the record's significance. In agreement with Logan's original criticism, he later said he should have "changed the arrangements because the arrangements are too samey ... four or five other songs should have had a change of mood." According to Robert Christgau in 1974, "Astral Weeks is still considered unlistenable [sic] obscure by many astute observers". Merenstein, on the other hand, still admires the album: "To this day it gives me pain to hear it. Pain is the wrong word—I'm so moved by it." In 2001, the album was certified gold by the Recording Industry Association of America, having shipped 500,000 copies in the US. Music historian Andrew Ford said the album's commercial performance, much like its musical aesthetic, is similar to classical music: "Neither instant nor evanescent: Astral Weeks will sell as many copies this year as it did in 1968 and has every year in between".

Astral Weeks has appeared in all-time best album polls worldwide. In 1978, it was voted the fourth best album of all time in Paul Gambaccini's poll of 50 prominent American and English rock critics. It was also ranked second greatest by Mojo in 1995, and third by The Times. In 2003, it was ranked number 19 by Rolling Stone on their list of the 500 Greatest Albums of All Time, maintaining the rating in a 2012 revision and dropping to number 60 in the 2020 reboot of the list. In 1998, it was voted the ninth greatest album of all time in a "Music of the Millennium" poll conducted by HMV, Channel 4 and The Guardian. In 2000, Q placed the record at number six on its list of the 100 Greatest British Albums Ever. Time included Astral Weeks in its 2006 list of the "All-Time 100 Albums". When Astral Weeks was voted the best Irish album of all time in 2009, Niall Stokes wrote in Hot Press, "It's an extraordinary work, packed with marvelously evocative songs that are rooted in Belfast but which deliver a powerful and lasting universal poetic resonance." The album was also included in the book 1001 Albums You Must Hear Before You Die. It ranked number 16 in the 2000 third edition of Colin Larkin's All Time Top 1000 Albums.

Marcus referred to the impact of the album, calling it a "common language", and related in a 2009 interview that "I was so shocked when I was teaching a seminar at Princeton just a couple years ago, and out of 16 students, four of them said their favorite album was Astral Weeks." Marcus goes on to say, "Now, how did it enter their lives? We're talking about an album that was recorded well before they were born, and yet it spoke to them. They understood its language as soon as they heard it." Elvis Costello described Astral Weeks as "still the most adventurous record made in the rock medium, and there hasn't been a record with that amount of daring made since". Johnny Depp, in a Rolling Stone interview in 2008, recalled how when he was a preteen his older brother (by ten years), tiring of Johnny's favourite music of the time said, "'Try this.' And he put on Van Morrison's Astral Weeks. And it stirred me. I'd never heard anything like it." Joan Armatrading has said that Astral Weeks was the first album she purchased as a teenager and that it opened her up musically. In August 2010, director and choreographer, Jessica Wallenfels, staged a production in Portland, Oregon, of a rock opera/story ballet of Astral Weeks called Find me Beside You.

== Astral Weeks revisited ==
Astral Weeks Live at the Hollywood Bowl
Sample from the live 2008 title song, "Astral Weeks (I Believe I've Transcended)", shows "a deeper, louder roar than the blue-eyed soul voice of his youth – softer on the diction – but none the less impressively powerful".

In November 2008, Van Morrison performed two concerts at the Hollywood Bowl in Los Angeles, California playing the entire Astral Weeks album. The band featured Jay Berliner, who played on the original album. Morrison toured performing the album live throughout most of 2009, with Rolling Stone calling these concerts "some of the most inspired performances of his whole career".

A live album entitled Astral Weeks Live at the Hollywood Bowl was released by Morrison's record label, Listen to the Lion, on 24 February 2009. It was also issued as a double vinyl LP album released the same date. A DVD featuring the Hollywood Bowl performances and entitled Astral Weeks Live at the Hollywood Bowl: The Concert Film was released on 19 May 2009.

When asked by Rolling Stone editor David Wild why he was performing the album again live after forty years, Morrison replied: "It received no promotion, from Warner Bros.—that's why I never got to play the songs live. I had always wanted to play the record live and fully orchestrated—that is what this is all about. I always like live recording and I like listening to live records too. I'm not too fond of being in a studio—it's too contrived and too confining. I like the freedom of live, in-the-moment sound."

As for the songs on the original album, Morrison told Los Angeles Times columnist Randy Lewis: "The songs are poetic stories, so the meaning is the same as always—timeless and unchanging. The songs are works of fiction that will inherently have a different meaning for different people. People take from it whatever their disposition to take from it is."

On 30 October 2015, the album remastered was reissued by Warner Bros. Records with four session bonus tracks, including the full-length versions of both "Ballerina" and "Slim Slow Slider".

== Track listing ==
All tracks are written by Van Morrison.

Part One: In The Beginning

1. "Astral Weeks" – 7:06
2. "Beside You" – 5:16
3. "Sweet Thing" – 4:25
4. "Cyprus Avenue" – 7:00

Part Two: Afterwards

1. "The Way Young Lovers Do" – 3:18
2. "Madame George" – 9:45
3. "Ballerina" – 7:03
4. "Slim Slow Slider" – 3:17

2015 reissue bonus tracks

9. "Beside You" (take 1) – 5:57
10. "Madame George" (take 4) – 8:24
11. "Ballerina" (long version) – 8:01
12. "Slim Slow Slider" (long version) – 4:53

== Personnel ==
=== Musicians ===
- Van Morrison – vocals, acoustic guitar
- Jay Berliner – classical and steel-string acoustic guitars
- Richard Davis – double bass
- John Payne – flute; soprano saxophone on "Slim Slow Slider"
- Warren Smith Jr. – percussion, vibraphone
- Connie Kay – drums
- Larry Fallon – string arrangements and conductor; harpsichord on "Cyprus Avenue"
- Unknown – flute on "Beside You" and "Cyprus Avenue"
- Barry Kornfeld – acoustic guitar on "The Way Young Lovers Do"

=== Production ===
- Lewis Merenstein – producer
- Brooks Arthur – engineer
- Ed Thrasher – art director
- Joel Brodsky – photography
- Steve Woolard – reissue production
- Kevin Gray – reissue remastering
- Neil Schwartz – audio engineer

== Charts ==
Chart (2015)	Peak position
Dutch Albums (Album Top 100)	59
Italian Albums (FIMI)	67
Scottish Albums (Official Charts)	38
UK Albums (Official Charts)	55

== Certifications ==
Region	Certification	Certified units/sales
Spain (Promusicae)	Gold	50,000^{^}
United Kingdom (BPI)	Platinum	300,000^{‡}
United States (RIAA)	Gold	500,000^{^}
^{^} Shipments figures based on certification alone.^{‡} Sales+streaming figures based on certification alone.

== Sources ==
- Bangs, Lester (1979). Marcus, Greil (ed.). Stranded:Rock and Roll for a Desert Island. Da Capo Press. ISBN 978-0-306-81532-4.
- Collis, John (1996). Inarticulate Speech of the Heart, Little Brown and Company, ISBN 0-306-80811-0.
- Ford, Andrew (1997). Illegal harmonies: music in the 20th century, Sydney: Hale & Iremonger ISBN 0-86806-635-4.
- Gillett, Charlie et al. (2008). Maria Johnston, ed. High Pop: The Irish Times Column, 1970–1976, Lagan Press, ISBN 1-90465-257-3.
- Hage, Erik (2009). The Words and Music of Van Morrison, Praeger Publishers, ISBN 978-0-313-35862-3.
- Heylin, Clinton (2003). Can You Feel the Silence? Van Morrison: A New Biography, Chicago Review Press, ISBN 1-55652-542-7.
- Hinton, Brian (1997). Celtic Crossroads: The Art of Van Morrison, Sanctuary, ISBN 1-86074-169-X.
- Jones, Carys Wyn (2008). The Rock Canon: Canonical Values in the Reception of Rock Albums. Ashgate Publishing. ISBN 978-0754662440..
- Marcus, Greil (2010). When That Rough God Goes Riding: Listening to Van Morrison, Public Affairs, ISBN 978-1-58648-821-5.
- Rogan, Johnny (2006). Van Morrison: No Surrender, London:Vintage Books, ISBN 978-0-09-943183-1.
- Turner, Steve (1993). Van Morrison: Too Late to Stop Now, Viking Penguin, ISBN 0-670-85147-7.
- Yorke, Ritchie (1975). Into The Music, London: Charisma Books, ISBN 0-85947-013-X.
