= Larry Fallon =

American composer (1936–2005)

- Born: Lawrence James Freaso; September 8, 1936
- Died: June 2, 2005 (aged 68) Hoboken, New Jersey, U.S.
- Occupations: Music director, record producer

Larry Fallon (born Lawrence James Freaso; September 8, 1936 – June 2, 2005) was an American composer, arranger and record producer.

== Career ==
Fallon's arranger credits include Van Morrison's Astral Weeks, Nico's Chelsea Girl, Jimmy Cliff's Wonderful World, Beautiful People, the Rolling Stones' "Gimme Shelter" and Gil Scott-Heron's Bridges. He played the distinctive harpsichord arrangement on Morrison's "Cyprus Avenue". He also arranged horns and strings on the Looking Glass's first album, Looking Glass. He co-wrote Traffic's "Shanghai Noodle Factory."

Fallon died in Hoboken, New Jersey, at the age of 68.
