= Ritchie Yorke =

Australian writer (1944–2017)

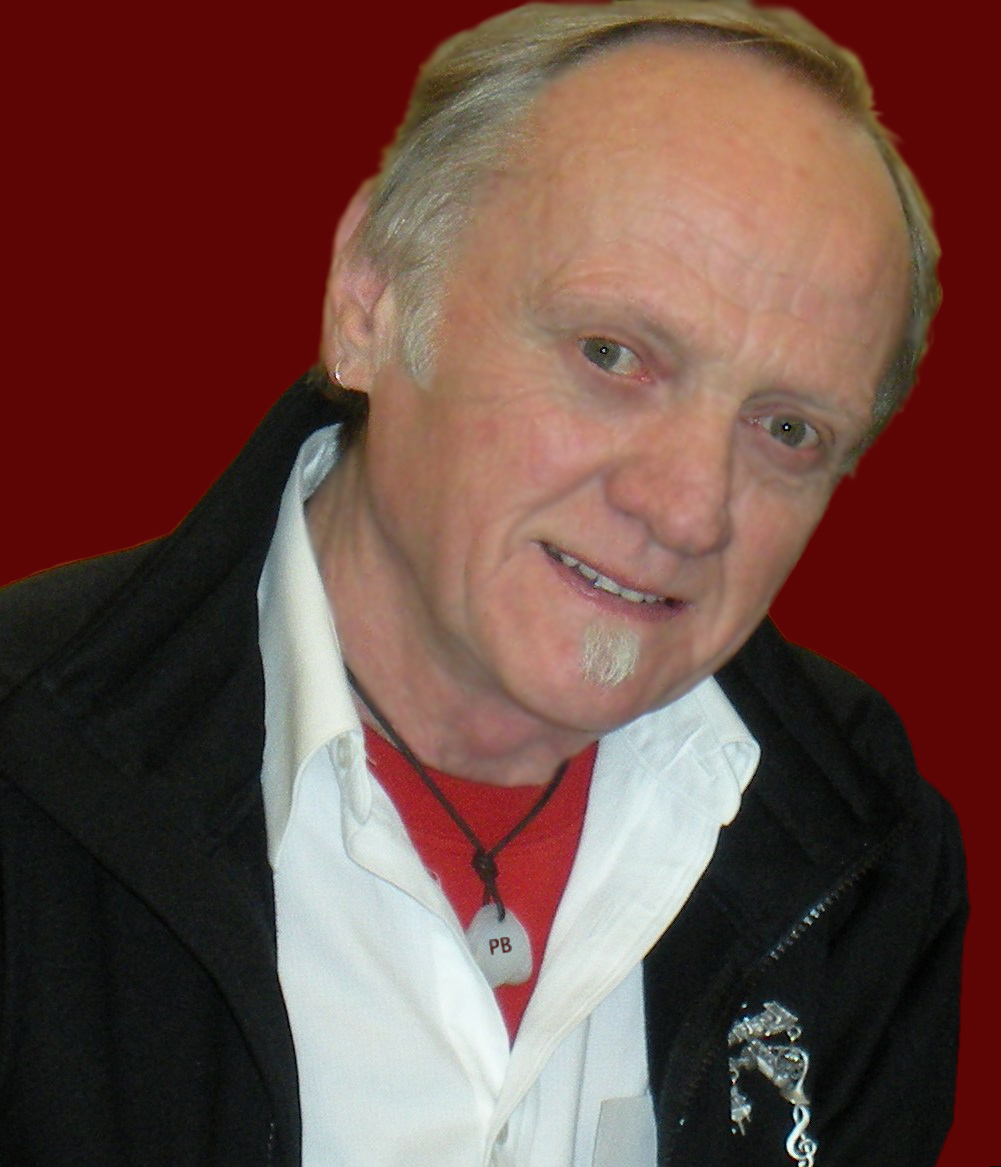
- Yorke in 2008
- Born: 12 January 1944; Brisbane, Australia
- Died: 6 February 2017 (aged 73); Brisbane, Australia
- Citizenship: Australian
- Occupations: Author; broadcaster; historian; journalist
- Website: http://ritchieyorke.com/

Ritchie Yorke (12 January 1944 – 6 February 2017) was an Australian author, broadcaster, historian and music journalist, whose work was widely published in the U.S., UK, Canada and elsewhere.

== Biography ==
=== Australia: 1962–1966 ===
Ritchie Yorke was born in 1944 in Brisbane, Australia. He began writing a weekly music column called Teen Topics for the Queensland edition of TV Week magazine in July 1962. From March 1964 to March 1965 he continued writing articles, relocating to work as a publicity and news reader at a radio station in Tamworth before returning to Brisbane to act as public relations director at 4KQ. It was during his time on radio in Tamworth that Yorke was delivered a copy of "Fingertips Pt. 2" by Little Stevie Wonder, a 12 year old blind boy. Impressed, Yorke played the song on his weekend show but was promptly told by higher-ups not to play this kind of music. In protest, the following week Yorke set up in his studio and managed to play "Fingertips Pt. 2" eight times in a row before he was removed from the studio and quickly fired. This caused Yorke's relocation to Brisbane to continue writing and making travel plans for the future.

=== United Kingdom: 1966–1967 ===
In 1966, Ritchie left Australia for London, England. From May to November of that year, Ivan Dayman appointed him the international operations director of Sunshine Records. He prepared record deals for, and managed Australian pop star Normie Rowe prior to his arrival in England. In December 1966, Yorke began working for Island Records as an international promotion manager for the Spencer Davis Group. He was tasked with promoting the band outside of England in support of their record "Gimme Some Lovin'". At this time, Yorke's first book was published, Lowdown on the English Pop Scene, foreword by Spencer Davis. A few months later Stevie Winwood left the Spencer Davis group to form a new band called Traffic, the managerial position of which was offered to Yorke, who declined, choosing instead to embark on a continental tour

=== Canada: 1967–1973 ===
Yorke arrived in Canada in 1967, settling in Toronto. He found work with the Toronto Telegram before being appointed the first full-time rock writer for Canada's national newspaper, The Globe and Mail. He also became the Canadian editor of Billboard magazine from 1970 to 1980 and Rolling Stone magazine from 1969 to 1970. He also began contributing features to NME magazine. In late 1969, Yorke assisted John Lennon with the coordination and execution of John Lennon and Yoko Ono's War Is Over! peace campaign. As well as helping to plan the Montreal bed-in from which Lennon's peace anthem "Give Peace a Chance" emerged, and the Toronto Rock and Roll Revival, he was one of many volunteers who assisted in plastering the posters all over Toronto. Yorke also carried the posters alongside rock musician and friend Ronnie Hawkins in a 52,000 mile world tour as the Lennons' official peace envoy. This five week tour even had them carry and display the posters illegally across the Chinese border near Hong Kong where they were stopped by Red Guards and solemnly warned they would be shot if they did not leave.

During this time, Yorke also produced Edward Bear's first album Bearings under the pseudonym "Tuft". He also appears on the Bad Manors album by Crowbar, credited with playing the anvil on "Prince Of Peace" and tambourine on "Oh What A Feeling".

Yorke was partly responsible for the introduction of the Canadian Content legislation that was instated in 1971, acting as a major advocate of the policy from a music industry point of view. He testified both to the adequacy of Canada's music supply as well as the necessity of radio support to create a viable Canadian music industry.

Later in 1971 he published the book Axes, Chops & Hot Licks, the first book to cover Canadian music culture and the development of the Canadian content laws, as well as the first book to be devoted entirely to any music scene outside of the United States or England. Later that year Yorke was named Canadian Journalist of the Year at the Juno Music Awards in Toronto.

The following year, Yorke assisted in organising the Maple Music Junket in which numerous continental writers, radio and TV programmers and editors and filmmakers were invited to observe five concerts in Montreal and Toronto (two of the concerts were in French).

=== London-Canada: 1973–1986 ===
In 1973, Yorke cut back on his assorted journalism and broadcasting activities to focus more heavily on books. Having befriended Led Zeppelin years earlier, he moved to London to work on their first official biography. He returned to Toronto in 1974, after serving on the Committee of Honour at the 8th Montreux International Jazz and Blues Festival. In 1975, he published his next book, Into the Music: The Van Morrison Biography.

Early in 1976 he released the widely acclaimed book The History of Rock 'n' Roll to coincide with the CHUM produced documentary of the same name he had been working on, as well as publishing The Led Zeppelin Biography.

=== Australia: 1986–2017 ===
In 1986, Yorke returned to his hometown of Brisbane, Australia to resume broadcasting and journalism. He worked as an announcer and producer for ABC Radio from 1987–1989 and wrote for Brisbane's Sunday Mail until 2007. During this time he also continued to work with Yoko Ono on various projects including her six disc Onobox collection. In 1991, he edited and re-released his Led Zeppelin book, this time titled Led Zeppelin: The Definitive Biography. In 2013 he married his third wife Minnie, and in 2015 he published his most recent book, detailing his relationship with John Lennon and his involvement in the peace campaign titled Christ You Know It Ain't Easy: John and Yoko's Battle for Peace with a foreword by Yoko Ono.

Ritchie Yorke died in hospital in Brisbane on 6 February 2017, from complications of chronic obstructive pulmonary disease.

== Journalism career: overview ==
Amongst the many publications he contributed to, Yorke was the Canadian Editor of Rolling Stone (1969–70), Canadian Editor of Billboard (1970–80), and was the Senior Music Writer for the Brisbane Sunday Mail for 20 years (1987–2007).

He has written biographies on Led Zeppelin and Van Morrison and also written for publications including TV Week Australia, Grapevine Magazine, Big Night Out, Brisbane Times, The Courier-Mail, Go-Set, Juke Magazine, Pix, Strangelove, The Sunday Mail (Brisbane) and Time Off. In the U.S. he regularly contributed to, or was syndicated in Billboard, Hit Parader Magazine, Circus Magazine, Gannett Newspapers, the Boston Globe, Chicago Daily News, Detroit Free Press, Rainbow Magazine, Hit Parader, Houston Post, Los Angeles Times, Los Angeles Free Press, Rolling Stone, Winnipeg Free Press, Washington Post and Zoo World. In the U.K. he has had his work published in Melody Maker, Mojo, New Musical Express, Nineteen Magazine, Petticoat Magazine and Rhythms. In Canada he was published in the Globe and Mail, the Montreal Star, Chatelaine, the Ottawa Journal, RPM, Sound Canada, the StarPhoenix, The Record, the Toronto Telegram, Music Express, and Winnipeg Free Press. Other publications he was involved with include Music Life from Japan and Music Maker from Hong Kong.

== Film ==
Throughout his career, Yorke made television appearances in addition to contributing to documentary films. In 1986, he wrote the documentary The Real Patsy Cline. He also featured in the documentary John & Yoko's Year of Peace. In 2010 he appeared as a guest panelist on music quiz show Spicks and Specks. He was interviewed for the 2011 documentary, Yonge Street: Toronto Rock & Roll Stories on Toronto's music scene of the late 1960s and early 1970s.

== Awards and accolades ==
- 1972 – Juno Awards – "Canadian Journalist of the Year"
- 2021 – SOCAN Awards – "SOCAN Guardian Award"

=== Queensland Music Awards ===
The Queensland Music Awards (previously known as Q Song Awards) are annual awards celebrating Queensland, Australia's brightest emerging artists and established legends. They commenced in 2006.

Year	Nominee / work	Award	Result (wins only)
2017	himself	Grant McLennan Lifetime Achievement Award	awarded

== Selected publications ==
=== Books ===
- Lowdown On The English Pop Scene, Horwitz, 1967.
- Axes Chops & Hot Licks (The Canadian Rock Music Scene), Hurtig Publishers, 1972. (ISBN 978-0888300522)
- Into The Music: The Van Morrison Biography, Charisma Books, 1975. (ISBN 0-85947-013-X)
- The Led Zeppelin Biography, Methuen Publications, 1976. (ISBN 9780846701033)
- The History Of Rock 'n' Roll, Methuen Publications, 1976. (ISBN 0-8467-0186-3).
- Led Zeppelin: The Definitive Biography, Virgin Books, 1991. (ISBN 0-86369-744-5)
- Christ You Know It Ain't Easy, Self-Published, 2015 (ISBN 9780994440020)

=== Contributions ===
- Montreux Jazz, Editions de la Tour, Lausanne SA, 1976. (ISBN 2851089765).
- The Ballad Of John And Yoko, M. Joseph/Rolling Stone Publishers, 1982. (ISBN 0-7181-2208-9)
- A Little Bull Goes A Long Way, Pennon Publishing, 2001. (ISBN 1-877029-01-7)
- Memories Of John, Harper Collins, 2005.(ISBN 0-06-059455-1).
- Hendrix On Hendrix, Chicago Review Press, 2012. (ISBN 978-1-61374-324-9).
- Rock Country, Hardie Grant Books, 2013. (ISBN 978-1-74270-521-7).
- Led Zeppelin On Led Zeppelin: Interviews And Encounters, Chicago Review Press, 2014. (ISBN 1-61374-757-8).

=== Liner notes ===
- 1968 – His Best: The Electric B.B. King – B.B. King
- 1969 – The Best of Carla Thomas – Carla Thomas
- 1969 – Bearings – Edward Bear
- 1969 – ...Continued – Tony Joe White
- 1969 – Dimensions – The Five Bells
- 1969 – Good Clean Fun – Kim Fowley
- 1969 _ Ice on Ice _ Jerry Butler
- 1969 – Soul '69 – Aretha Franklin
- 1970 – A Song of Joy – Miguel Rios
- 1970 – The Cycle
- 1970 – Official Music – King Biscuit Boy
- 1970 – Ronnie Hawkins – Ronnie Hawkins
- 1970 – Waldo De Los Rios – Sinfonias
- 1970– The Way It Is – Big Mama Thornton
- 1971 – Bad Manors – Crowbar
- 1971 – Kinfolk – Leigh Ashford
- 1971 – Rock Bottom – Various Artists
- 1971 – Peaches – Etta James
- 1971 – You're My People – Pepper Tree
- 1972 – Emergence – Neil Sedaka
- 1972 – Reflections of My Childhood – Frank Mills
- 1974 – The Best of King Curtis – King Curtis
- 2000 – At His Best – José Feliciano
- 2006 – Swamp Music: The Complete Monument Recordings – Tony Joe White
