= Brian Hinton =

English poet and musicologist

- Born: 21 September 1950 (age 75); Southampton, United Kingdom
- Occupations: poet, musicologist, biographer, actor glish

Brian Hinton, MBE (born 21 September 1950) is an English poet and musicologist. In June 2006 he was honoured in H. M. the Queen's Birthday Honours List with an MBE for services to the Arts.

== Education ==
Born in Southampton, Hinton studied English at Magdalen College, Oxford, where he served as President of the Oxford University Poetry Society, and went on to receive a PhD in Twentieth Century English poetry at Birmingham University. He completed a postgraduate diploma in information science and represents the policy forum on the Southwestern branch committee of Cilip, the professional body representing librarians and information workers.

== Career ==
Hinton is the author of more than thirty books on various topics. His primary interest has been literary researches into the circle of Alfred Tennyson on the Isle of Wight in the late nineteenth century and early twentieth century, especially in regard to the photographer Julia Margaret Cameron. Hinton is Chairman of the Julia Margaret Cameron Trust and curator at Dimbola Lodge, Freshwater. He also serves as President of the Farringford Tennyson Society. Hinton is an Associate Editor of the international literary magazine, Tears in the Fence and co-hosted the Tears in the Fence London readings from 2001 to 2004 at John Calder's Bookshop, The Cut, Waterloo, London, with David Caddy.

He has organised photographic exhibitions by David Bailey, Charlton Heston, Koo Stark and many others at Dimbola Lodge. In June 2009, he organised a photographic exhibition by American singer and songwriter Patti Smith that took place at Dimbola Lodge.

With publication of his unauthorised study of the music and life of Van Morrison, Celtic Crossroads: The Art of Van Morrison, the song "New Biography" was composed by the artist and included on his album Back on Top.

Hinton is the model for the character Dr T.C.P. Hinton in Iain Sinclair's novel, Downriver (1991) and appeared in Iain Sinclair and Christopher Petit's Channel 4 film, The Cardinal and the Corpse (1992), alongside Derek Raymond (Robin Cook), Emanuel Litvinoff and Martin Stone.

He has appeared many times on radio and television and was featured in May 2009 on the BBC Poetry Season discussing Tennyson in BBC Four's Changing of the Bard, presented by Ian Hislop. This programme was repeated on BBC Two. Hinton has played the character, Randolph Minton M.P., in the internet drama serial, Middle Ditch, since 2007, starring among others: David Caddy and Gordon Haskell.

== Publications ==
=== Poetry ===
- The Heart's Clockwork (Enitharmon Press 1989) illustrated by Julian Bell
- Whodunnit (Ure Press 1994)
- Ties (Tears in the Fence 1995)

=== Music books ===
- Joni Mitchell: Both Sides Now (Sanctuary 1995)
- Celtic Crossroads – The Art of Van Morrison (Sanctuary 1996)
- Message to Love: Isle of Wight Festival, 1968, 1969, 1970 (Sanctuary 1996)
- Let Them All Talk: Elvis Costello (Sanctuary 1997)
- Country Roads: How Country Came To Nashville (Sanctuary 2000)
- Ashley Hutchings (Helter Skelter 2002)
- South By South-West: A Road Map of Alternative Country (Sanctuary 2003)
- Bold As Love: the return of the Isle of Wight Festival (Solo 2005)
- Bob Dylan Album File and Complete Discography (Cassel Illustrated 2006 /Universe USA 2006)

=== Literature ===
- Discovering Island Writers: Exploring the Literary Tradition of the Isle of Wight (Island Books 2001), revised edition 2007
