= In the Garden (Van Morrison song) =

Song by Van Morrison

from the album No Guru, No Method, No Teacher
- Released: July 1986
- Genre: Celtic, folk rock, jazz fusion
- Length: 5:46
- Label: Mercury
- Songwriter: Van Morrison
- Producer: Van Morrison

No Guru, No Method, No Teacher track listing
- 1. "Got to Go Back"; 2. "Oh the Warm Feeling"; 3. "Foreign Window"; 4. "A Town Called Paradise"; 5. "In the Garden"; 6. "Tir Na Nóg"; 7. "Here Comes the Knight"; 8. "Thanks for the Information"; 9. "One Irish Rover"; 10. "Ivory Tower"

"In the Garden" is a spiritually inspired song written by Northern Irish singer-songwriter Van Morrison and included on his 1986 album No Guru, No Method, No Teacher.

== Recording and composition ==
The album version of the song was recorded in 1985 at Studio D at the Sausalito Record Plant in Sausalito, California.

The lyrics of "In the Garden" contain a line which gives the album its name: "No Guru, no method, no teacher/ Just you and I and nature/And the Father in the garden." Some of the words also fall back to Astral Weeks territory with mentions of "childlike visions", "into a trance" from the song, "Madame George" and "in the garden wet with rain" from "Sweet Thing". According to Morrison, the song is based upon a form of transcendental meditation, which takes about ten minutes before a person arrives at a degree of tranquility.

Biographer Johnny Rogan has highlighted the song as one of the defining tracks of Morrison's career, comparing it with works such as "Into the Mystic", "Listen to the Lion", and "You Don't Pull No Punches, But You Don't Push the River". He also believes that "Morrison himself recognises 'In the Garden' as perhaps the key recording in the Eighties career."

== Other releases ==
"In the Garden" was one of the songs performed and featured on Van Morrison The Concert, Morrison's video film released in 1990. It was included on The Best of Van Morrison Volume Two In 1993. A live version was one of the songs on the 1994 album, A Night in San Francisco. The compilation album issued in 2007 Still on Top - The Greatest Hits contains a remastered version of the song.

== Personnel on original release ==
- Van Morrison – vocal
- David Hayes – bass
- Jeff Labes – piano
- Chris Michie – guitar
- Baba Trunde – drums
