= Beautiful Vision =

Studio album by Van Morrison
- Released: 16 February 1982
- Recorded: May–summer 1981
- Studio: Record Plant (Sausalito)
- Genre: Celtic folk, jazz, rock, rhythm and blues
- Length: 45:31
- Label: Mercury (All countries except US & Canada [Original release]); Warner Bros. (US & Canada); Polydor (1989 & 1998 European reissues)
- Producer: Van Morrison

Van Morrison chronology
Common One (1980)	Beautiful Vision (1982)	Inarticulate Speech of the Heart (1983)

Singles from Beautiful Vision
- 1. "Cleaning Windows" b/w "It's All in the Game" Released: March 1982; 2. "Scandinavia" b/w "Dweller on the Threshold" Released: June 1982

Beautiful Vision is the thirteenth studio album by Northern Irish singer-songwriter Van Morrison, released in February 1982. It continued Morrison's departure from R&B at the time, instead favoring Celtic folk and American jazz in its music. As with many of Morrison's recordings, spirituality is a major theme and some of the songs are based on the teachings of Alice Bailey. Other songs show Morrison's Celtic heritage and reminiscence of his Belfast background.

Beautiful Vision received critical acclaim but garnered only modest chart success, peaking at number 31 on the UK album charts and number 44 on the US Billboard 200.

== Recording ==
The first recording session started in May 1981 at the Record Plant studios, Sausalito, California, near the Golden Gate, San Francisco. Although only "Scandinavia" was released on Beautiful Vision from this session, "Cleaning Windows" and "Celtic Ray" were re-recorded for Beautiful Vision later on. All the other songs or instrumentals from the session were included on one of Morrison's later albums: the instrumentals "All Saints Day" and "Daring Night" appeared with lyrics on the albums Hymns to the Silence and Avalon Sunset, and "Down the Road I Go" was renamed "Down the Road" and used as the title track on Down the Road.

On 27 July Morrison entered the recording studio to record "Cleaning Windows" and "Aryan Mist". Morrison brought in different musicians for this session, including his former drummer Gary Mallaber and guitarist Mark Knopfler.

Morrison concluded recording in the summer, when he recorded the rest of the songs for the album. Four songs were not used from this session, including the future singles "Real Real Gone" and "Tore Down a la Rimbaud". Neither Knopfler nor Herbie Armstrong were able to produce the guitar tone Morrison wanted, so engineer Jim Stern suggested Chris Michie: "I got the call when I was doing a session in San Francisco. Van's producer Jim Stern said 'Can you get to the Plant [in Sausalito] in twenty minutes?' I said 'Yeah.' I walked into the studio with my gear as the band and Van were doing ... basic tracks. I was set up and playing before the end of the song 'She Gives Me Religion'". Michie later added lead guitar overdubs to "Cleaning Windows" and "Aryan Mist". Knopfler's contributions still featured on the final release, but are not as audible as Michie's.

== Composition ==
According to the liner notes, some of the lyrics derive from the book Glamour: A World Problem by esoteric writer Alice Bailey. It is also said to have been strongly influenced by his new girlfriend, Ulla Munch, from Vanløse in Copenhagen, Denmark. The album also emphasised the distance Morrison had moved away from R&B and was inspired by Irish music. He commented at the time, "It's important for people to get into the music of their own culture... I think it can be dangerous to not validate the music of where you're from, for anybody, whether it's Bulgaria or whatever."

The opening song, "Celtic Ray", was one of the first songs to be written for the album. It is concerned with the singer's connection to the ancient Celtic culture. The song has the concept of messages coming through the ether from Mother Ireland. "Northern Muse (Solid Ground)" adds a young woman in County Down to a similar theme. Morrison commented in an interview with Hot Press in 1982 that "Some of the material [on Beautiful Vision], when it started, was more traditional. Some of the songs – like 'Solid Ground' and 'Celtic Ray' – they basically started out as folk-oriented stuff, and ... ended up being integrated as folk/R&B."

"Dweller on the Threshold" and "Aryan Mist" are credited to the religious writings of Alice Bailey. Her book discusses the New Age ideas of "glamours" or "mental illusions", which formed a fog that covers the "spiritual warrior" and the "Aryan race" from the world. When the "dweller on the threshold" was covered with the light of the soul or "Angel of Presence" illumination came. Some of these ideas were quoted in the two Morrison compositions, both co-written with Hugh Murphy. In 1982 Morrison revealed in an interview: "I've read Glamour four or five times, and I get different things out of it each time. [Alice Bailey]'s saying a lot of things. It's depth reading. You might read it on Wednesday and on Thursday you pick it up again and get an entirely different thing. I don't feel qualified to speak about what it's about – you really have to read it yourself ... because there's so much in there."

"Beautiful Vision" can be interpreted as either a vision of heaven or of his girlfriend, who also influences "She Gives Me Religion" and "Vanlose Stairway" (which refers to the stairway in the apartment where she lived). Biographer Clinton Heylin believes the songs "'Vanlose Stairway' and 'She Gives Me Religion' [were] perhaps Morrison's most captivating love songs since the days of Veedon Fleece." "Cleaning Windows" is about Morrison's first full-time job and the last carefree days of his adolescence in the years 1961 to 1962, and is a metaphor for the idea that his music alters people's perceptions of life. Biographer Steve Turner believes in this song Morrison "captured the balance between his contentment at work and his aspirations to learn more about music. It conveyed the impression that his happiness with the mundane routine of smoking Woodbine cigarettes, eating Paris buns and drinking lemonade was made possible by the promise that at the end of the day he could enter the world of books and records ... ". The melody is very upbeat and embellished with organ and guitar, reminiscent to the music of The Band. The song is written in a similar fashion to Morrison's 1970 song, "And It Stoned Me".

It is interpreted by three of Morrison's biographers that "Across the Bridge Where Angels Dwell" is literally about the bridge that separated Morrison's Mill Valley, California home from the San Mateo house where his daughter, Shana and ex-wife Janet Morrison Minto (née Rigsby) lived. The interpretation originated with Irish musician Phil Coulter who, according to biographer Rogan "...assumed there was [such] a subtext". There is no other evidence for this interpretation, however, and the song makes no reference to either Morrison's daughter or ex-wife. Further weakening Coulter's interpretation is the fact that the lyrics were co-written by Hugh Murphy. Murphy's two other songwriting contributions to the album are "Dweller on the Threshold" and "Aryan Myst", both explicitly influenced by Alice Bailey's work "Glamour: A World Problem", which contains direct references to angels. Beautiful Vision ends with the instrumental "Scandinavia", with Morrison on piano and prominently features Mark Isham's synthesizer.

== Release and reception ==
Professional ratings
Review scores
Source	Rating
AllMusic	3/5 stars
Christgau's Record Guide	A−
Record Mirror	3/5 stars
Rolling Stone	4/5 stars
The Rolling Stone Album Guide	4/5 stars
The Village Voice	A

Beautiful Vision was released in February 1982 by Mercury Records in the United Kingdom and Warner Bros. Records in the United States. Its packaging featured a front cover conceptualized by Rudy Legname (later known as Rudi). It consists of a hand reaching up to a circle of cloud, containing a crescent shape, stars and a prismatic rainbow. The album was not released with a lyric sheet, and many of the first vinyl pressings were cut off-center, all because of production issues that resulted in a lack of quality control and "shoddy packaging", according to Morrison biographer Brian Hinton.

Beautiful Vision received acclaim from contemporary critics. In a review for The Village Voice, Robert Christgau deemed it a musically cohesive album whose songs nonetheless all sound distinct, especially "Cleaning Windows", which he said ranks among Morrison's greatest songs: "This music is purely gorgeous (or at times lovely), its pleasure all formal grace and aptness of invention." Chip Stern from High Fidelity believed even the inferior songs are a pleasure to listen to because of Morrison's maturation into a more relaxed and disciplined singer, while his band is eclectic yet subtle enough to incorporate a number of styles without sounding ostentatious: "On tunes like 'Dweller on the Threshold', an r&b groove will suddenly support Celtic, Oriental, or Northern European folk references." Rolling Stone magazine's John Milward was less enthusiastic and lamented four of the songs because of what he felt were unimaginative lyrics, instances "when he lets his brain trivialize his heart" on an album that is otherwise superior to the temporal, superficial nature of most popular music, "a cogent statement of belief that finds Morrison touching his dangerously dogmatic themes with the grace of God". Also with mixed feelings was John Piccarella of The Boston Phoenix. He first noted that "At its most banal, on the dragging title ballad for instance, Beautiful Vision's spiritual content is nothing more than vague mood, and it’s hard to take Morrison's clichés as God given, no matter how purely they're rendered." But he concluded that "when the music's this good I'd rather not choose between having someone clean my windows or having Van offer me a gaze through the rose tint of his own."

At the end of 1982, Beautiful Vision was voted the 28th best album of the year in the Pazz & Jop, an annual poll of prominent critics published by The Village Voice. Billboard magazine's Sam Sutherland named it 1982's ninth best record in his own year-end list and said "Morrison's fusion of Celtic folk, American jazz and universal mysticism remains unique." "Scandinavia" was nominated in the Best Rock Instrumental Performance category for the 25th Annual Grammy Awards.

According to Morrison biographer Johnny Rogan, Beautiful Vision was "well-structured and arranged ... which offered depth and listenability. It also underlined the extent to which Morrison had moved away from the R&B stylings which had made him such a hit on American FM radio." In The New Rolling Stone Record Guide (1983), Dave Marsh called it proof of his enduring strength as a recording artist, a more consistent set of songs than Common One (1980), and the most he has used jazz rhythms since Astral Weeks (1968). Stephen Thomas Erlewine was more critical in a retrospective review for AllMusic, writing that because of the music's indistinct melodies and measured pace that threatens to dull, many of the songs are unessential for most listeners. The Guardian's Laura Barton, on the other hand, said it "never struck me as dull; on the contrary, its particular strangeness has always proved appealing – an exploration of Celtic heritage, distance, reminiscence, spirituality and the writings of Alice Bailey." NME magazine named it the 45th greatest album of the 1980s, while Rolling Stone ranked it fourth in a poll of both critics and readers on the "15 Worst Albums by Great Bands".

== Aftermath ==
Morrison was eager to include the new material recorded for Beautiful Vision in concert. Before the album was released he performed three-quarters of it at shows in California in October 1981. However his live performances at this point were increasingly confined to the San Francisco Bay Area. His manager, Bill Graham, was concerned that Morrison was not promoting the album with a nationwide tour of the US. Morrison fired Graham on stage in San Francisco. Herbie Armstrong remembered "He was taking Van in the wrong direction. He was trying to commercialize him." Warner Brothers persuaded Morrison to allow Tom Dowd to produce the album but after Morrison became suspicious of Warner's motives, Dowd's services were not used and Morrison took over production of the album.

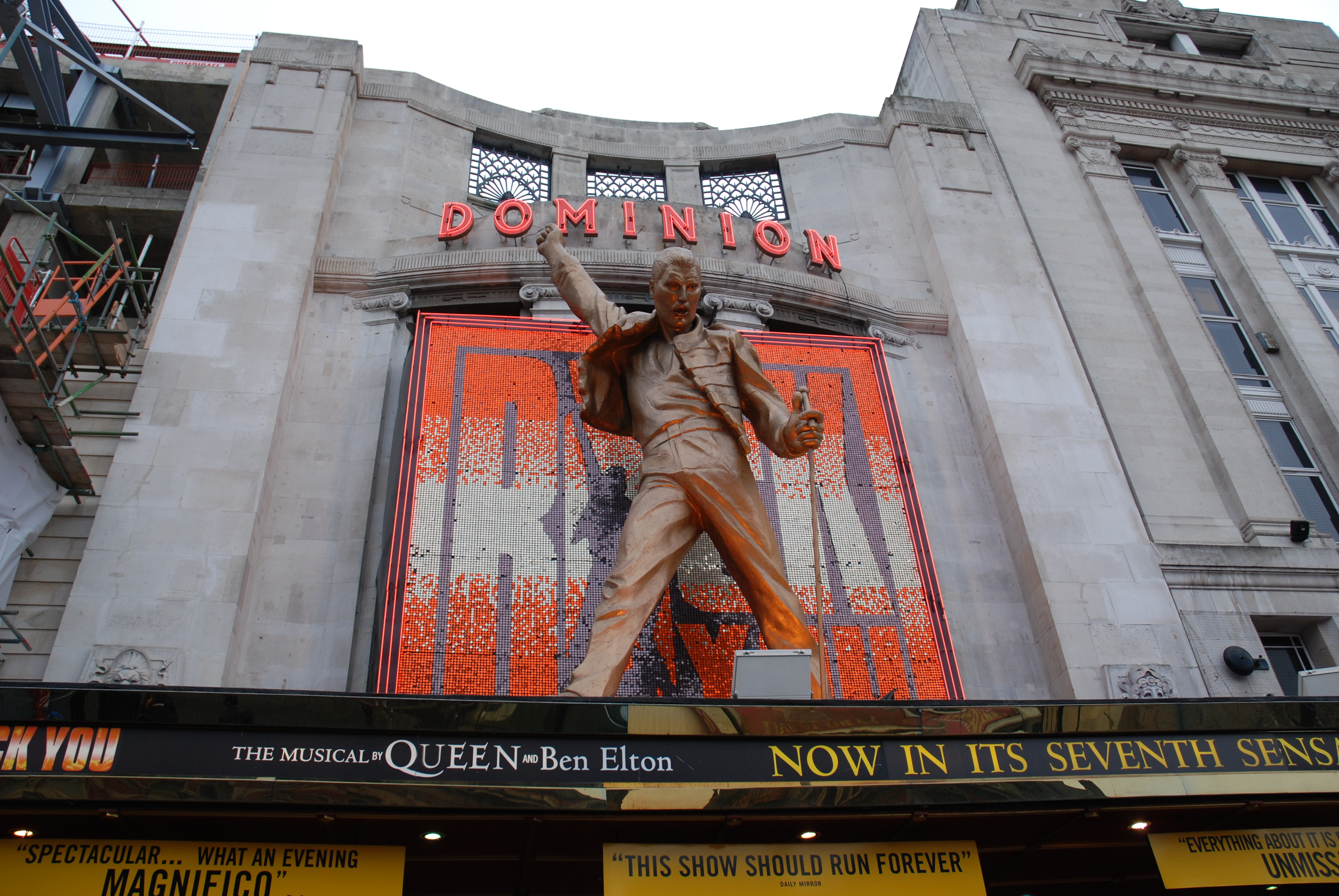
Morrison performed four shows at the Dominion Theatre, London to promote the album.

After the release of the album, Morrison performed a series of concerts at the Dominion Theatre, London, opened by Herbie Armstrong with an acoustic set. Paul Charles, who managed Morrison's business affairs at the time, commented that

"The idea [behind the Dominion residencies] was [to go against the] 'come into town, do one show, get all the press down, get the radio and TV and record-company people' [mentally]. My logic was, 'Look, with Van it's not just a rock & roll tour. It's not just here's the hits, here's the new record, please buy it, whatever.' It was a performance. ... A certain number of people would come back every night, [knowing that] Van will not have a set-list that he adheres to religiously ... So I thought, 'Here's a way. Van is not having any singles. Van doesn't do TV. How can we get attention to him doing what he does?' Well, the best thing that he does is perform live. I think we did four [concerts] the first time. We ended up doing eleven [in 1984]. We got a lot of coverage, we got a lot of attention, without him having to do something he didn't like."

Morrison's love of live performing was reignited by this set of concerts and he commented at the time that it was "more like appearing in a play, going to the theatre and doing your job every day – which I prefer to touring because that's very fragmented and disorientating." According to Johnny Rogan, these performances "are still regarded by many as his most memorable since the glory days of the Caledonia Soul Orchestra.

All the songs of the album have been performed live, some of them many hundred times, whereas "Across the bridge where angels dwell" and "Scandinavia" were only played on very few concerts. A concert on 3 to 4 April 1982 at the Grugahalle, Essen, Germany, was broadcast in many European countries as a TV/radio simulcast in the Rockpalast TV series by German TV station WDR. Seven of the songs that were performed were from Beautiful Vision.

In March 1983, Morrison performed a series of four concerts at the Grand Opera House; six of the Beautiful Vision songs were featured on the live album Live at the Grand Opera House Belfast that was composed of the two best concerts performed at this venue. On 27 January 1984, Morrison performed at another Rockpalast TV special from the Midem at Cannes, where he promoted Inarticulate Speech of the Heart and included seven songs from Beautiful Vision.

"Vanlose Stairway" is one of the songs that Morrison has performed most frequently since the release of the album; the song has featured in over seven hundred of Morrison's shows, behind only "Moondance", "Gloria" and "It's All in the Game" (as of 2010).

A remastered version was released in 1998. On 29 August 2008 an extended remastered version with alternative takes of "Cleaning Windows" and "Real Real Gone" was planned to be released in the Remasters series, but got postponed until 9 January 2009 and was eventually cancelled.

== Track listing ==
All tracks are written by Van Morrison, except as indicated.

Side one
No.	Title	Lyrics	Music	Length
1.	"Celtic Ray"			4:11
2.	"Northern Muse (Solid Ground)"			4:05
3.	"Dweller on the Threshold"	Van Morrison/Hugh Murphy	Van Morrison	4:49
4.	"Beautiful Vision"			4:08
5.	"She Gives Me Religion"			4:33
Total length:				21:46

Side two
No.	Title	Lyrics	Music	Length
1.	"Cleaning Windows"			4:43
2.	"Vanlose Stairway"			4:10
3.	"Aryan Mist"	Van Morrison/Hugh Murphy	Van Morrison	4:00
4.	"Across the Bridge Where Angels Dwell"	Van Morrison/Hugh Murphy	Van Morrison	4:31
5.	"Scandinavia"			6:41
Total length:				24:05

== Personnel ==
=== Musicians ===
- Van Morrison – lead vocals, guitar, piano, Fender Rhodes electric piano
- David Hayes – bass guitar
- Mark Isham – synthesizer, trumpet
- Rob Wasserman – bass guitar on "Cleaning Windows" and "Aryan Mist"
- John Allair – Hammond organ
- Herbie Armstrong – acoustic guitar on "Scandinavia"
- Pee Wee Ellis – tenor saxophone, baritone saxophone, flute
- Tom Donlinger – drums
- Sean Folsom – Uilleann pipes on "Celtic Ray" and "Northern Muse"
- Chris Hayes – guitar
- Mark Knopfler – guitar on "Cleaning Windows" and "Aryan Mist"
- Pauline Lozano – backing vocals
- Gary Mallaber – drums on "Cleaning Windows" and "Aryan Mist"
- Chris Michie – guitar
- Michele Segan – percussion on "Cleaning Windows" and "Aryan Mist"
- Annie Stocking – backing vocals
- Bianca Thornton – backing vocals
- Peter Van Hooke – drums on "Scandinavia"

=== Production ===
- Producer: Van Morrison
- Engineers: Jim Stern and Hugh Murphy
- Assistant Engineer: Ann Fry
- Business Arrangements: Paul Charles
- Cover Concept, Photograph and Design: Rudi Legname

== Charts ==
=== Album ===
Chart (1982)	Peak position
Australia (Kent Music Report)	20
UK Albums Chart	31
US Billboard 200	44

=== Singles ===
Year	Single	Peak positions	
Year	Single	US	UK
1982	"Cleaning Windows"	—	—
1982	"Scandinavia"	—	—
"—" denotes releases that did not chart.

== Certifications ==
Region	Certification	Certified units/sales
Australia (ARIA)	Gold	35,000^{^}
^{^} Shipments figures based on certification alone.
