= Dweller on the Threshold (song) =

Single by Van Morrison

from the album Live at the Grand Opera House Belfast
- A-side: "Dweller on the Threshold"
- B-side: "Northern Muse (Solid Ground)"
- Released: April 1984
- Recorded: Summer 1981 at Record Plant Studios, Sausalito, California
- Genre: Celtic, R&B
- Length: 4:46 (Studio version); 3:38 (Live version)
- Label: Mercury
- Songwriter(s): Van Morrison, Hugh Murphy
- Producer(s): Van Morrison

Van Morrison singles chronology
"Celtic Swing" (1983)	"Dweller on the Threshold" (1984)	"A Sense of Wonder" (1984)

"Dweller on the Threshold" is a song written by Northern Irish singer-songwriter Van Morrison and first released on his 1982 album Beautiful Vision. It was released as a single on the B-Side in 1982 with the instrumental "Scandinavia" as the "A" side. Another release in 1984 had a live version of "Dweller on the Threshold" as the A-Side.

== Recording and composition ==
The song was recorded for the album on the Beautiful Visions sessions in summer 1981 at the Record Plant Studios in Sausalito, California.

The lyrics on this song and part of "Aryan Mist" were inspired by the 1950 publication Glamour —A World Problem by Alice Bailey and the Tibetan master Djwal Khul, as described in Van Morrison's liner notes for the album. According to the teachings of Bailey, there are a series of what she calls "glamours" which are mental illusions creating a fog that veils the spiritual wanderer from seeing the world as it truly is. He becomes illuminated as a "dweller on the threshold" when the "Angel of Presence" purifies the soul with light. This song was co-written with Morrison's engineer Hugh Murphy.

== Other releases ==
A live version of this song was performed on the Live at the Grand Opera House Belfast album recorded when Morrison appeared in concert on 11 and 12 March 1983. "Dweller on the Threshold" was one of the hit songs that was featured on Morrison's first ever "Best of" album, The Best of Van Morrison, which was released by Polydor in 1990. It is one of the songs remastered and included on Morrison's third compilation album for 2007, Still on Top - The Greatest Hits. It is featured on both the two disc set released in the UK on 22 October 2007, and as one of the twenty-one hits on the single disc released on 6 November 2007, in the US and Canada.

== Personnel ==
- Van Morrison – vocals
- Tom Donlinger – drums
- Pee Wee Ellis – tenor saxophone
- Chris Hayes – guitar
- David Hayes – bass guitar
- Mark Isham – trumpet
- Pauline Lozano – backing vocals
- Chris Michie – guitar
- Annie Stocking – backing vocals
- Bianca Thornton – backing vocals
