= Hyndford Street =

Street in Bloomfield, East Belfast, Northern Ireland

Hyndford Street is a Protestant working-class street in Bloomfield, Belfast, in Northern Ireland. It lies off the Beersbridge Road.

It is most well known for being the birthplace of musician Van Morrison. Van lived in 125 Hyndford Street, with his father, George Morrison, and his mother, Violet Morrison. Morrison's good friend, jazz musician George Cassidy also grew up on Hyndford Street, number 49. Cassidy taught Van Morrison tenor saxophone and music reading lessons. Van described him as a "big inspiration" and went on to say: "At 15, I was taking lessons from a guy called George Cassidy, who lived in the same street. He was a great jazz player. He had the chops."' As Van Morrison and George Cassidy both lived on the same street, this made it extremely accessible for Morrison to continue to learn, they continued to bond, and became great friends.

== Area and events ==
Houses on Hyndford Street are terrace housing. Nearby areas include the Comber Greenway (formerly a railway line between Comber and the city of Belfast) and Cyprus Avenue.

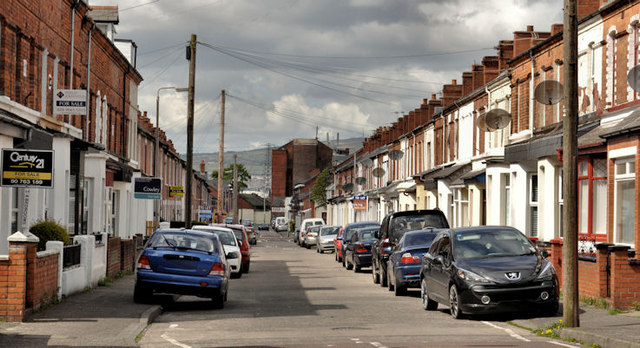
Hyndford Street

125 Hyndford Street displays a brass plaque, marking the family home in which Van Morrison grew up in.

The previous occupant of 125 Hyndford Street before Van Morrison's family was Lee Child's father.

In 1957, Van Morrison joined a skiffle group known as "The Sputniks". They would practice in an alley behind Van's home.

In August 2023, a pipe bomb exploded next to a household bin on the street. Hyndford Street residents were evacuated from their homes following a discovery from police officers described as a "crude pipe bomb-type device". No major damage or injuries were reported.

In May 2024, an event known as the " Hyndford Street - aWhisper Project" took place, in a Hyndford Street alley. Musicians played together to mark the beginning of Bealtaine, and a tribute to Van Morrison in the same setting as when he met The Sputniks.

In August 2024, a Wild Service Exhibition took place at Hyndford Street Alley, by artist Emily Mcilwaine.

In 2025, a foundation ran by Van Morrison's daughter, Shana Morrison, submitted a bid for 125 Hyndford Street to Belfast City Council to turn his home into a Van Morrison museum.

== Media ==
Van Morrison released a song named after his childhood street, with his 1991 studio album release "Hymns to the Silence" included the song "On Hyndford Street". Van portrays his life on Hyndford Street as an idyllic period free from real life matters, confusion and sorrow.

Van describes the pylons, meaning the area of Hyndford Street in which he used as a reference point to meet his friends. This is featured in "You Know What They're Writing About" (on studio album Into the Music).

Other songs featuring Hyndford Street include "See Me Through Part II (Just A Closer Walk With Thee)" (on Hymns To the Silence).

Hyndford Street is a part of the "Van Morrison trail" which is a route that tourists and fans take to visit locations that Van Morrison experienced during his early life. Celebrities have also visited Hyndford Street, including former Dr Who actor Christopher Eccleston visited Morrison's home.
