= Ivory Tower (Van Morrison song) =

Single by Van Morrison

from the album No Guru, No Method, No Teacher
- A-side: "Ivory Tower"
- B-side: "A New Kind of Man"
- Released: 1986
- Recorded: 1985
- Genre: Celtic, folk rock
- Length: 3:34
- Label: Mercury Records
- Songwriter: Van Morrison
- Producer: Van Morrison

Van Morrison singles chronology
"Tore Down a la Rimbaud" (1985)	"Ivory Tower" (1986)	"Got to Go Back" (1986)

"Ivory Tower" is a song written by Northern Irish singer-songwriter Van Morrison and included on his 1986 album, No Guru, No Method, No Teacher. The song was also released as a single with the B-side "A New Kind of Man", from his previous album A Sense of Wonder. It charted at No. 21 on the US Mainstream Rock Tracks in 1986.

Clinton Heylin writes this about the song "A chorus about how tough 'It really must be/ To be me, to see like me, to feel like me' threatens the spirituality self-effacing mood he had previously maintained." Biographer John Collis takes the same viewpoint by saying "Ivory Tower, totally breaks the mold – it's an r'n'b shaker just like those produced by the Van Morrison of old, though now he suffers from self pity: "Don't you know the price I have to pay/Just to do everything I have to do..."

Billboard said it is an "upbeat r&b boogie." Cash Box said it is an "outstanding and blustery return to form for the brilliant and visionary Morrison."

== Personnel on original release ==
- Van Morrison – vocal
- June Boyce – backing vocals
- Richie Buckley – tenor saxophone
- Martin Drover – trumpet
- David Hayes – bass
- Rosie Hunter – backing vocals
- Jeff Labes – piano
- Chris Michie – guitar
- John Platania – guitar
- Bianca Thornton – backing vocals
- Jeanie Tracy – backing vocals
- Baba Trunde – drums
