= Paris buns =

Sweetened breadlike cake similar to scones

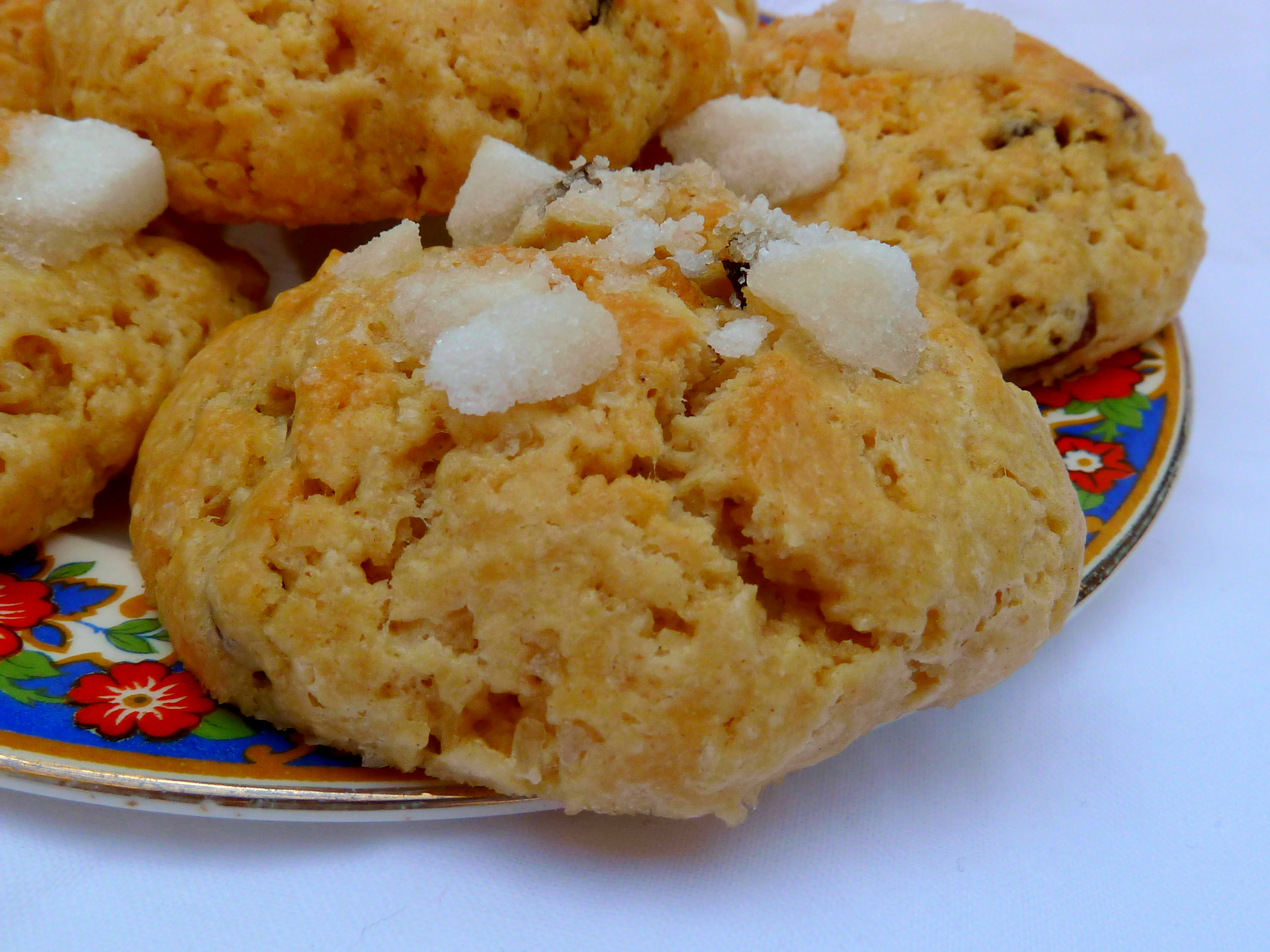
- Paris buns
- Type: scone / cake
- Region or state: Scotland
- Serving temperature: warm
- Main ingredients: flour, butter, sugar, fruit, egg, milk, sugar nibs
- Other information: Served sliced horizontally and buttered

Paris buns are a sweet baked good that falls between a scone and a cake. They are typically decorated with currants or pearl sugar nibs. A recipe from an 1881 cookbook refers to Paris buns as "Scotch" and says that three of the buns cost a penny. They used to be popular in Belfast, Northern Ireland as well as in western Scotland, or in poorer regions.

== In popular culture ==
- John Dufresne included the story 'Lemonade & Paris Buns' in his 2005 short story collection Johnny Too Bad.
- Van Morrison mentions Paris buns in the song 'Cleaning Windows' from his 1982 album Beautiful Vision.
