= Vanlose Stairway =

Song by Van Morrison

from the album Beautiful Vision
- Released: January 1982
- Genre: Celtic, blue-eyed soul
- Length: 4:10
- Label: Warner Bros.
- Songwriter: Van Morrison
- Producer: Van Morrison

"Vanlose Stairway" is a song written by the Northern Irish singer-songwriter Van Morrison, and included on his 1982 album Beautiful Vision. It has remained a popular concert performance throughout Morrison's career and has become one of his most played songs.

== Recording and composition ==
It was recorded in the summer of 1981 at the Record Plant in Sausalito, California.

Morrison wrote the song about his Danish girlfriend, Ulla Munch, from Vanløse district in Copenhagen who lived on the fourth floor of an apartment building with no lift. Clinton Heylin remarks..."he turned this mundane set of stairs in an uninspiring block of flats into a 'Stairway that reaches up to the moon/And it comes right back....to you'. Peter Mills, author of the Morrison biography Hymns to the Silence, refers to "Vanlose Stairway" as this "dark horse of a song".

The singer also includes the lines "Send me your Pillow" which referenced bluesman John Lee Hooker's influence on his music.

== Live performances ==
The song has been performed by Morrison over seven hundred times, making it the seventh most played song at his concerts. He performed a baroque rendition of this song with the Dallas Jazz Orchestra at the 1989 Montreux Jazz Festival.

== Other releases ==
A live performance of "Vanlose Stairway" was included on Morrison's 1984 album, Live at the Grand Opera House Belfast. Morrison often performed the song as a medley with "Trans-Euro Train" and Ray Charles' "A Fool for You". Live versions of the song in this format appeared on the 1994 album, A Night in San Francisco, and the 2019 deluxe edition of The Healing Game, from Morrison's 1997 performance at the Montreux Jazz Festival. It was remastered and released on the 2007 compilation album, Still on Top - The Greatest Hits.

== Personnel on original release ==
- Van Morrison - lead vocals, harmonica
- John Allair - organ
- Tom Donlinger - drums
- Pee Wee Ellis - tenor saxophone
- Chris Hayes - guitar
- David Hayes - bass
- Mark Isham - trumpet
- Pauline Lozano - backing vocals
- Chris Michie - guitar
- Annie Stocking - backing vocals
- Bianca Thornton - backing vocals
