= No Prima Donna: The Songs of Van Morrison =

Compilation album by various artists
- Released: 1994
- Genre: various
- Label: Polydor
- Producer: Van Morrison, Phil Coulter

No Prima Donna: The Songs of Van Morrison released in October 1994 is the first tribute album for the songs of singer-songwriter Van Morrison. The album was produced by Van Morrison and his friend for many years, Phil Coulter. Morrison's longtime girlfriend, Michelle Rocca was the model on the cover of the album. Morrison was actively involved in choosing the songs and the artists who performed them, which is unusual for most tribute albums.

== Track listing ==
All songs by Van Morrison

1. "You Make Me Feel So Free" performed by Sinéad O'Connor – 4:46
2. "Queen of the Slipstream" performed by Brian Kennedy – 4:43
3. "Coney Island" performed by Liam Neeson – 2:23
4. "Crazy Love" performed by Cassandra Wilson – 3:11
5. "Bright Side of the Road" performed by Hothouse Flowers – 5:04
6. "Irish Heartbeat" performed by Brian Kennedy, and Shana Morrison – 4:56
7. "Full Force Gale" performed by Elvis Costello – 3:01
8. "Tupelo Honey" performed by Phil Coulter Orchestra – 3:26
9. "Madame George" performed by Marianne Faithfull – 4:47
10. "Friday's Child" performed by Lisa Stansfield – 3:47

== Personnel ==
On all tracks

- Ivan Gilliland – guitar
- Foggy Lyttle – guitar
- Nicky Scott – bass
- Phil Coulter – keyboards, piano
- Liam Bradley – drums
- Carl Geraghty – saxophone
