= Full Force Gale =

Single by Van Morrison

from the album Into the Music
- A-side: "Full Force Gale"
- B-side: "Bright Side of the Road"
- Released: 1979
- Recorded: Spring 1979 at the Record Plant Studios, Sausalito, California
- Genre: Acoustic rock; gospel rock; Celtic rock
- Length: 3:14
- Label: Warner Bros.
- Songwriter: Van Morrison
- Producer: Van Morrison

Van Morrison singles chronology
"Bright Side of the Road" (1979)	"Full Force Gale" (1979)	"You Make Me Feel So Free" (1980)

"Full Force Gale" is a song written by Northern Irish singer-songwriter Van Morrison. It was included on his 1979 album Into the Music.

== Recording and composition ==
"Full Force Gale" was recorded in spring, 1979 at the Record Plant Studios, Sausalito, California for the album Into the Music.

The song has a moderately fast 4/4 tempo. It is in the key of D major. The song's introduction uses the chords D–A–G–A–D–G–D–A, while the verses use the chord progression D–A–G–D–A–G–D–A–G–A–D–A. The bridge uses the progression Bm-G-A. The song features a slide guitar solo by Ry Cooder.

In the lyrics Morrison describes the feeling of encounters with "the Lord". Biographer Peter Mills said that "It is a physical effect – he is "lifted up again" as if by a natural force, the full-force gale being a simile for this: 'Like a full force gale'". Because of this Mills concluded that Into the Music has religious elements to it: "Into the Music is New Testament, dealing with forgiveness, love and kindness."

When biographer Steve Turner asked the singer about the theme of rebirth that occurs quite often in his songs, Morrison answered, "I wrote a song called 'Full Force Gale' in which I said 'No matter where I roam/I will find my way back home/I will always return to the Lord'. That answers it for me. No matter what I might say at the present, that's my feeling about that."

== Response ==
Record World said that "Van's stirring vocal has a great mate in the person of Toni Marcus and her heavenly electric violin."

Allmusic's reviewer, P.G. Ward, calls it: "Essentially a brisk pop tune, Morrison sings it with great fervour and commitment, delivering simple couplets such as 'In the gentle evening breeze/In the whispering shady trees/I will find my sanctuary in the Lord' with immense skill. The arrangement is also magnificent, with the fiddle part a particular joy..." He goes on to say: "Into the Music is one of Van Morrison's finest albums, and 'Full Force Gale' is arguably its finest track."

As described by Brian Hinton, "'Full Force Gale' has the cheerful punch of the best gospel singing, and sees Van 'lifted up by the Lord' ... as with Wordsworth, the divine is perceived not through religious teachings but through nature ... "

== Appearance on other albums ==
- "Full Force Gale" is also featured on the 1990 compilation album The Best of Van Morrison.
- A live version appeared on the 1984 CD Live at the Grand Opera House Belfast.
- This song is one of the hits re-mastered in 2007 and included on the compilation album, Still on Top - The Greatest Hits.

== Personnel ==
- Van Morrison: vocal, guitar
- Herbie Armstrong: guitar
- Ry Cooder: slide guitar
- Pee Wee Ellis: tenor saxophone
- David Hayes: bass
- Mark Isham: trumpet
- Mark Jordan: piano
- Toni Marcus: violin
- Katie Kissoon: backing vocals
- Peter Van Hooke: drums

== Covers ==
- Elvis Costello – his version appears on the 1994 tribute album, No Prima Donna: The Songs of Van Morrison and also on Costello's own 1995 album, Kojak Variety.
