= Scandinavia (composition) =

Single by Van Morrison

from the album Beautiful Vision
- A-side: "Scandinavia"
- B-side: "Dweller on the Threshold"
- Released: June 1982
- Recorded: May 1981
- Genre: instrumental rock
- Length: 6:41
- Label: Mercury
- Composer(s): Van Morrison
- Producer(s): Van Morrison

Van Morrison singles chronology
"Cleaning Windows" (1982)	"Scandinavia" (1982)	"Cry For Home" (1983)

"Scandinavia" is an instrumental composition by Northern Irish singer-songwriter Van Morrison and is the closing track on his 1982 album Beautiful Vision.

The track was the first instrumental Morrison released but which was followed by others during the 1980s. It has been performed in concert only a few times. Morrison played the composition on 3 April 1982 at the Grugahalle in Essen, Germany and was broadcast on Rockpalast in Germany and the BBC in the UK.

It was recorded at the first recording session for the Beautiful Vision album and was the only track from this session that would be used on the album. The musicians featured differed from the other tracks on the finished album and had appeared with Morrison at the Great American Music Hall in March 1981. Morrison played piano on this instrumental.

The composition was nominated in the Best Rock Instrumental Performance category for the 25th Annual Grammy Awards.

It was used throughout the 1993 BBC documentary series 40 Minutes.

== Personnel ==
- Van Morrison – piano
- Mark Isham – synthesizers
- Herbie Armstrong – acoustic guitar
- David Hayes – bass
- Peter Van Hooke – drums
