= You Make Me Feel So Free =

Single by Van Morrison

from the album Into the Music
- A-side: "You Make Me Feel So Free"
- B-side: "Full Force Gale"
- Released: 1980
- Recorded: Spring 1979
- Genre: R&B; Funk rock Pop rock
- Length: 4:09
- Label: Warner Bros.
- Songwriter: Van Morrison
- Producer: Van Morrison

Van Morrison singles chronology
"Full Force Gale" (1979)	"You Make Me Feel So Free" (1980)	"Cleaning Windows" (1982)

"You Make Me Feel So Free" is a song written by Irish singer-songwriter Van Morrison and recorded on his 1979 album, Into the Music.

Biographer Johnny Rogan writes about the song "It seems that the surer the singer is of his message, the clearer is his enunciation, and that he is more prone to chew on his words when he is less confident in the song itself. This seems true of "You Make Me Feel So Free", though the message of the title seems clear enough. There are musical compensations in David Hayes' bubbling bass and Pee Wee Ellis' saxophone solo."

== Appearance on other albums ==
- A live version was included on his 1994 album, A Night in San Francisco.

== Personnel on original release ==
- Van Morrison: vocals
- Herbie Armstrong: guitar
- Pee Wee Ellis: tenor saxophone
- David Hayes: bass guitar
- Mark Isham: trumpet
- Mark Jordan: piano
- Katie Kissoon: backing vocals
- Peter Van Hooke: drums

== Covers ==
- Sinéad O'Connor performed the song on the Van Morrison tribute album No Prima Donna: The Songs of Van Morrison.
