= Real Gone =

Real Gone may refer to:

- Real Gone (album), a 2004 album by Tom Waits
- "Real Gone" (song), a 2006 song recorded by Sheryl Crow for the soundtrack to the film Cars
- "Real Real Gone", a 1990 song by Van Morrison
- Gone Records, a record label originally known as Real Gone
