= The Best of Van Morrison Volume Two =

Greatest hits album by Van Morrison
- Released: 9 March 1993
- Recorded: Mostly 1984–1991
- Genre: Rock, rock & roll, folk rock, R&B, pop rock, blues
- Length: 74:37
- Label: Polydor
- Producer: Van Morrison

Van Morrison chronology
Hymns to the Silence (1991)	The Best of Van Morrison Volume Two (1993)	Too Long in Exile (1993)

The Best of Van Morrison Volume Two is a compilation album by Northern Irish singer-songwriter Van Morrison released in 1993.

Morrison chose the tracks for this album himself. It is mostly drawn from his work during 1984–1991. "Real Real Gone" from the 1990 album Enlightenment was the only song included that was a fairly successful single. The other songs were not well known except for among longtime fans. They were a good example of his more idiosyncratic material that had been prevalent during this period when his work was mostly about spiritual searches for fulfillment. But also included were a 1960s Them cover of John Lee Hooker's "Don't Look Back" and "It's All Over Now, Baby Blue" a Bob Dylan cover.

Professional ratings
Review scores
Source	Rating
Allmusic	link

== Track listing ==
All songs written by Van Morrison except as indicated.

1. "Real Real Gone" – 3:42
  from Enlightenment, 1990
2. "When Will I Ever Learn to Live in God?" – 5:39
  from Avalon Sunset, 1989
3. "Sometimes I Feel Like a Motherless Child" (Traditional) – 4:27
  from Poetic Champions Compose, 1987
4. "In the Garden" – 5:46
  from No Guru, No Method, No Teacher, 1986
5. "A Sense of Wonder" – 7:12
  from A Sense of Wonder, 1985
6. "I'll Tell Me Ma" (Traditional) – 2:31
  with The Chieftains
  from Irish Heartbeat, 1988
7. "Coney Island" – 2:03
  from Avalon Sunset, 1989
8. "Enlightenment" – 4:07
  from Enlightenment, 1990
9. "Rave on, John Donne/Rave On, Part Two" (Live) – 9:17
  from Live at the Grand Opera House Belfast, 1984
10. "Don't Look Back" (John Lee Hooker) – 3:20
  with Them
  from The Angry Young Them, 1965
11. "It's All Over Now, Baby Blue" (Bob Dylan) – 3:51
  with Them
  from Them Again, 1966
12. "One Irish Rover" – 3:28
  from No Guru, No Method, No Teacher, 1986
13. "The Mystery" – 5:17
  from Poetic Champions Compose, 1987
14. "Hymns to the Silence" – 9:33
  from Hymns to the Silence, 1991
15. "Evening Meditation" {instrumental} – 4:14
  from A Sense of Wonder, 1985

== Charts ==
=== Weekly charts ===
Chart (1993)	Peak position
Australian Albums (ARIA)	28
Dutch Albums (Album Top 100)	38
New Zealand Albums (RMNZ)	6

=== Year-end charts ===
Chart (1993)	Position
New Zealand Albums (RMNZ)	50
