= No Guru, No Method, No Teacher =

Studio album by Van Morrison
- Released: July 1986
- Recorded: 1985
- Studios: Studio D (Sausalito); Record Plant (Sausalito); Townhouse (London, UK)
- Genre: Pop rock
- Length: 50:50
- Label: Mercury
- Producer: Van Morrison

Van Morrison chronology
A Sense of Wonder (1984)	No Guru, No Method, No Teacher (1986)	Poetic Champions Compose (1987)

Singles from No Guru, No Method, No Teacher
- 1. "Ivory Tower" b/w "A New Kind of Man" Released: June 1986; 2. "Got to Go Back" b/w "In the Garden" Released: August 1986

No Guru, No Method, No Teacher is the sixteenth studio album by Northern Irish singer-songwriter Van Morrison, released in 1986 on Mercury.

Upon release in 1986, it was well received by critics and charted at number twenty-seven in the UK and number seventy on the Billboard 200.

== Recording and composition ==
The album was recorded at Studio D and Record Plant Studios in Sausalito, California in 1985 with Jim Stern as engineer. The basic takes were recorded at Studio D with Chris Michie, Jef Labes, Babatunde Lea (credited as "Baba Trunde"), David Hayes and Morrison. Overdubs, guitar solos, strings and back-up vocals were added at the Record Plant with the masters taken to Townhouse Studios in London. Overdubs with Ritchie Buckley on saxophone, Martin Drover on trumpet and oboe played by Kate St. John were added in the London studio.

The album title is evocative of a 1966 quotation by Jiddu Krishnamurti: "...there is no teacher, no pupil; there is no leader; there is no guru; there is no Master, no Saviour. You yourself are the teacher and the pupil; you are the Master; you are the guru; you are the leader; you are everything."

The song "In the Garden" was a favorite fan concert performance for years. Morrison told Mick Brown in 1986 on the Interview Album: "I take you through a definite meditation process which is a form of transcendental meditation. It's not about TM, forget about that. You should have some degree of tranquillity by the time you get to the end. It only takes about ten minutes to do this process." There are references back to Astral Weeks with gardens wet with rain and a childlike vision. The words are poetic as in the line "you are a creature all in rapture/You had the key to your soul".

"Got to Go Back" features Kate St. John's oboe and reminisces of school days back in the singer's childhood in Belfast. "Oh, The Warm Feeling" is also a song of feeling the safety of family and love in childhood.

"Foreign Window" is a song concerned with dealing with some sort of self-imposed therapy and having to go on no matter what. Brian Hinton remarks, "There is a grace and majesty here which I have experienced from little else in rock music."

"Here Comes the Knight" is a pun on the Them song "Here Comes the Night" and quotes from the epitaph on the gravestone of one of Morrison's favorite poets, W. B. Yeats. The Yeats Estate had denied Morrison's request to transform a Yeats poem to music, but the gravestone was considered public property: "Here come horsemen through the pass / They say cast a cold eye on life, on death".

"Ivory Tower" echoes Yeats once more.

The song "Thanks For the Information" is a comment on the cliches of the business world.

== Critical reception ==
Professional ratings
Review scores
Source	Rating
AllMusic	4/5 stars
Encyclopedia of Popular Music	4/5 stars
Hot Press	11/12
The Rolling Stone Album Guide	2/5 stars
The Village Voice	B−

No Guru, No Method, No Teacher was well received by contemporary critics and proved to be Morrison's best-reviewed album during the 1980s. Barry McIlheney from Melody Maker hailed it as a "magnificent return to form" that will astound listeners who had become disenchanted with his last few albums. John Wilde in Sounds remarks, "the crescendos here are never dampened by their subtle nature and never fall short of blinding. The whole album aches with a steady stream of sorrow" and concluded by calling it the best record of that year so far, upon release. In Rolling Stone, David Fricke described the album as "a fragile, familiar schematic, laid out over haunting, circular melodies airbrushed with acoustic guitars and often abruptly broken up by Morrison's idiosyncratic vocal phrasing." Chicago Tribune critic Lynn Van Matre said it reminded her of Morrison's 1968 album Astral Weeks, as most of the songs "on this beautiful and deeply soulful album resound with gentle, questing hope."

In a more critical review, NME magazine said Morrison "no longer takes the breath away and as a musician has been content to age with dignity." In The Village Voice, Robert Christgau's critique came in the form of quip mocking the album's title: "no soap radio" (in reference to the nonsensical punchline to an unstated joke, suggesting Morrison's lyrics are unintelligible or meaningless), "no particular place to go" (a reference to the Chuck Berry song of the same name), "no man is an island" (suggesting Morrison is solipsistic), "no spring chicken" (mocking his cantankerous mood and obsession with mortality), "no-doz" (the caffeine pill, suggesting the album is a bore), and "no can do" (conclusion upon listening to it).

In a retrospective review for The Rolling Stone Album Guide (2004), Rob Sheffield dismissed No Guru, No Method, No Teacher as a "cranky self-imitation", with Morrison complaining about "how you don't understand him because you live in an 'Ivory Tower', though he obviously hadn't listened to any music in years except his own." By contrast, biographer Clinton Heylin called it "his most consummate record since Wavelength and his most intriguingly involved since Astral Weeks, this is bursting to saturation point, Morrison at this most mystical, magical best." The Independent's Nick Coleman gave its remastered edition a rave review, urging listeners to buy it "because no one has realised William Blake’s visionary ambitions more cogently in popular song. Because the songs are remarkable".

The album is ranked number 977 in All-Time Top 1000 Albums (3rd. edition, 2000). A 2014 article in Stereogum ranked it as Morrison's fourth-best album (after Veedon Fleece, Astral Weeks, and Saint Dominic's Preview).

== Reissue ==
The 2008 reissued and remastered version of the album contains an alternate take of "Oh the Warm Feeling" and a previously unreleased Morrison composition "Lonely at the Top". "Thanks for the Information" from this album was listed as one of the standout tracks from the six album reissue.

== Track listing ==
All songs written by Van Morrison

=== Side one ===
1. "Got to Go Back" – 5:00
2. "Oh the Warm Feeling" – 3:16
3. "Foreign Window" – 5:20
4. "A Town Called Paradise" – 6:13
5. "In the Garden" – 5:46

=== Side two ===
1. "Tir Na Nog" – 7:14
2. "Here Comes the Knight" – 3:41
3. "Thanks for the Information" – 7:16
4. "One Irish Rover" – 3:30
5. "Ivory Tower" – 3:34

=== Bonus tracks (2008 CD reissue) ===
1. "Oh the Warm Feeling" (alternate take)
2. "Lonely at the Top"

== Personnel ==
=== Musicians ===
- Van Morrison – guitar, harmonica, vocals
- Teressa "Terry" Adams – cello, string section leader on "Tir Na Nog"
- June Boyce – backing vocals
- Richie Buckley – tenor and soprano saxophones
- Nadine Cox – harp on "Tir Na Nog"
- Martin Drover – trumpet
- Joseph Edelberg – violin
- David Hayes – bass
- Rosie Hunter – backing vocalist
- Jef Labes – piano, synthesizer, string arrangement on "Tir Na Nog"
- Chris Michie – guitar
- John Platania – guitar
- Rebecca Sebring – viola
- Kate St. John – cor anglais, oboe on "Got to Go Back", "Foreign Window" and "Here Come the Knight"
- John Tenney – violin
- Bianca Thornton – backing vocals
- Jeanie Tracy – backing vocals
- Babatunde Lea (credited as Baba Trunde) – drums

=== Production ===
- Van Morrison – producer
- Mick Glossop – engineer
- Jim Stern – engineer
- Lenette Viegas – assistant engineer

== Charts ==
Chart performance for No Guru, No Method, No Teacher
Chart (1986)	Peak position
Australian Albums (Kent Music Report)	32
Dutch Albums (Album Top 100)	30
German Albums (Offizielle Top 100)	46
New Zealand Albums (RMNZ)	20
Swedish Albums (Sverigetopplistan)	9
UK Albums (Official Charts)	27
US Billboard 200	70
