= Into the Music =

Studio album by Van Morrison
- Released: August 1979
- Recorded: Early 1979
- Studio: Record Plant, Sausalito
- Genre: Rhythm and blues, rock and roll, Gaelic music
- Length: 49:30
- Label: Warner Bros. (US/Canada) / Mercury (Worldwide, excl. US/Canada)
- Producer: Van Morrison, Mick Glossop

Van Morrison chronology
Wavelength (1978)	Into the Music (1979)	Common One (1980)

Singles from Into the Music
- 1. "Bright Side of the Road" b/w "Rolling Hills"" Released: September 1979; 2. "Full Force Gale" b/w "Bright Side of the Road" Released: December 1979; 3. "You Make Me Feel So Free" b/w "Full Force Gale" Released: 1980

Into the Music is the 11th studio album by Northern Irish singer-songwriter Van Morrison, and was released in August 1979. It includes "Bright Side of the Road", which peaked at number 63 on the UK Singles Chart, and other songs in which Morrison sought to return to his more profound and transcendent style after the pop-oriented Wavelength. The record received favourable reviews from several music critics and was named as one of the year's best albums in the Pazz & Jop critics' poll.

== Recording ==
Into the Music was recorded in early 1979 at the Record Plant in Sausalito, California, with Mick Glossop as engineer.

During the recording of the album, one of the musicians, trumpet player Mark Isham, referred Morrison to Pee Wee Ellis who lived nearby. Morrison brought him in to do the horn charts for "Troubadours", but Ellis remained and worked on the entire album. The band also included Toni Marcus on strings, Robin Williamson on penny whistle, and Ry Cooder playing slide guitar on "Full Force Gale".

== Music and lyrics ==
Morrison wrote most of the songs while he was staying with Herbie Armstrong in the Cotswold village of Epwell, England, and the sense of place is reflected in the spirit of the music. During this time, he would often walk through the fields with his guitar composing the future album's songs.

Erik Hage commented that after the favourable commercial reception of Wavelength, Morrison was inspired to "return to something deeper, to once again take up the quest for music that was spontaneous, meditative, and transcendent—music that satisfied the other side of his artistic nature." Morrison was quoted on his opinion of the album, "Into the Music was about the first album where I felt, I'm starting here...the Wavelength thing, I didn't really feel that was me." (1988) "That's when I got back into it. That's why I called it Into the Music." (1984)

The opening track, "Bright Side of the Road" peaked at number 63 on the UK Singles Chart. The healing power of music would be subtly introduced on "And the Healing Has Begun", and would be a continuing theme in Morrison's music. Although celebration of love and life was the predominant theme of the album, this was especially true of "Troubadours", "Steppin' Out Queen" and "You Make Me Feel So Free". "Troubadours" is an uplifting celebration of the singer-songwriter from ancient days, walking through towns "singin songs of love and chivalry". "Rolling Hills" is a joyful song in which the singer directly refers to Christianity and to living his life "in Him" and reading the Bible. The album is notable for its interpolation of an elegiac version of the fifties pop hit "It's All in the Game". It was a B-side of the Morrison song "Cleaning Windows".

== Critical reception ==
Professional ratings
Review scores
Source	Rating
AllMusic	4.5/5 stars
The Encyclopedia of Popular Music	3/5 stars
The Great Rock Discography	8/10
Tom Hull	A+
MusicHound Rock	3.5/5 stars
The Rolling Stone Album Guide	5/5 stars
The Village Voice	A

In a contemporary review for Rolling Stone, Jay Cocks hailed Into the Music as a daring "record of splendid peace" and "vastly ambitious attempt to reconcile various states of grace: physical, spiritual and artistic". "That's what this album is about, proudly and stunningly and with no apologies", Cocks wrote. "Resurrection. Real Hope." Tom Bentkowski from New York found Morrison's spirituality casually but confidently expressed in songs that are "introspective, impressionistic", and "charged by the author's overwhelming belief in them". High Fidelity was impressed by Morrison's ability to explore a diversity of universal emotions and called the album "the full-circle complement to his most cosmic, allegorical work", veering from gospel-rooted R&B and Gaelic songs to rock and roll blended with "heartfelt religious fervor". "There's a general sense of happiness and clarity here", the magazine wrote, "as if Morrison has finally distilled his feelings down to their most essential musical level." In The Village Voice, Robert Christgau deemed Into the Music his best record since 1970's Moondance while writing that like Bob Dylan, Morrison had "abandoned metaphorical pretensions, but only because he loves the world". Morrison's simple odes to rural life, he believed, were made vivid and deeper by backing musicians such as Marcus and "by his own excursions into a vocalese that has never been more various or apt." Christgau viewed "It's All in the Game" as the album's only great song, however, and was somewhat critical of the "lightweight rockers" and "You Know What They're Writing About", which he felt sounded tedious halfway through.

Don Snowden of the Los Angeles Times described Into the Music as "a more personal, more definitely Van Morrison album than Wavelength", but complained that "Bright Side of the Road" and "You Make Me Feel So Free" lacked the "rhythmic punch and melodic substance" of the artist's early-1970s R&B songs and that elsewhere, "tempos often drag when they should push and few of the melodies make any lasting impression." Snowden also wrote: "Despite sporadically interesting passages, the four songs on the second side carry on far too long." Reviewing for the NME, Paul Rambali welcomed Morrison's return to Veedon Fleece-style musical arrangements but said, with the exception of "Full Force Gale" and "Rolling Hills", they lacked the precision that Jeff Labes had brought to the artist's earlier work and instead "merge the songs into a jaunty, lightweight mass". He also said that Morrison's singing lacked conviction and concluded: "I hate records like this – neither particularly good nor especially bad but just, well, pleasant. They hang there frustrating you in the run-off grooves ... And I hate this even more because Van Morrison made it, and because he set out with the right idea this time, too." John Rockwell, in The New York Times, opined that "the trouble is largely the sound of Mr. Morrison's voice, which seems to this taste almost impossibly swallowed and strangulated."

Into the Music was voted the sixth-best album of 1979 in the Pazz & Jop, an annual poll of American critics nationwide; Christgau, the poll's supervisor, ranked it fourth on his own year-end list. In The Rolling Stone Album Guide (1983), Dave Marsh later said the second half's suite of nocturnal ballads was "the greatest side of music Morrison has created since Astral Weeks". Morrison biographer Erik Hage called the record "a fully fleshed-out musical vision that often surrenders to rapturous moments of pure beauty".

== Aftermath ==
After the release of Into the Music and before his next release Common One in 1980, Morrison appeared at the Montreux Jazz Festival with a fleshed-out band. He performed two of the songs from the album, "Troubadours" and "Angeliou". These two songs featured Morrison interacting with the brass section, composed of Pee Wee Ellis and Mark Isham. Erik Hage describes this musical relationship between Morrison and the two brass musicians as "simply stunning". Morrison's 2006-released DVD, Live at Montreux 1980/1974, contained these performances of the two songs.

The 29 January 2008 reissued and remastered version of Into the Music contains alternative takes of "Steppin' Out Queen" and "Troubadours".

== Track listing ==
All songs written by Van Morrison, unless noted.

Side one

1. "Bright Side of the Road" – 3:47
2. "Full Force Gale" – 3:14
3. "Steppin' Out Queen" – 5:28
4. "Troubadours" – 4:41
5. "Rolling Hills" – 2:53
6. "You Make Me Feel So Free" – 4:09

Side two

1. "Angeliou" – 6:48
2. "And the Healing Has Begun" – 7:59
3. "It's All in the Game" (Charles Dawes, Carl Sigman) – 4:39
4. "You Know What They're Writing About" – 6:10

2008 Compact Disc bonus tracks

11. "Steppin' Out Queen" (Alternate take) – 7:00
12. "Troubadours" (Alternate take) – 5:30

== Personnel ==
Musicians

- Van Morrison – vocals, guitar, harmonica
- Herbie Armstrong – guitar, backing vocals
- Ry Cooder – slide guitar on "Full Force Gale"
- David Hayes – bass guitar
- Toni Marcus – mandolin, violin, viola, stroviola
- Mark Jordan – piano
- John Allair – Hammond organ on "And the Healing Has Begun"
- Mark Isham – trumpet, flugelhorn, piccolo trumpet
- Pee Wee Ellis – tenor saxophone
- Robin Williamson – penny whistle on "Troubadours" and "Rolling Hills"
- Katie Kissoon – backing vocals
- Zakir Hussain – tabla on "Bright Side of the Road" and "Steppin' Out Queen"
- Peter Van Hooke – drums
- Kurt Wortman – drums on "Troubadours"

Production

- Producer: Van Morrison
- Assistant Producer: Mick Glossop
- Recorded & Mixed by: Mick Glossop
- Assistant Engineers: Alex Kash (recording), Leslie Ann Jones (mixing)
- Horn Arrangements: Pee Wee Ellis, Mark Isham
- Coordination: Richard Freeman, Ed Fletcher
- Photography and design: Norman Seeff

== Charts ==
Chart performance for Into the Music
Chart (1979)	Peak position
Australian Albums (Kent Music Report)	16
Dutch Albums (Album Top 100)	33
New Zealand Albums (RMNZ)	13
Norwegian Albums (VG-lista)	16
UK Albums (OCC)	21
US Pop Albums	43
