= Enlightenment (Van Morrison song) =

Single by Van Morrison

from the album Enlightenment
- A-side: "Enlightenment"
- B-side: "Avalon of the Heart"
- Released: January 1991
- Recorded: October 1989
- Genre: Celtic, folk rock
- Length: 4:04
- Label: Polydor
- Songwriter(s): Van Morrison
- Producer(s): Van Morrison

Van Morrison singles chronology
"In The Days Before Rock 'N' Roll" (1990)	"Enlightenment" (1991)	"I Can't Stop Loving You" (1991)

"Enlightenment" is a single written by Northern Irish singer-songwriter Van Morrison and included on his 1990 album Enlightenment. The song was also included on the 1993 compilation album The Best of Van Morrison Volume Two.

Biographer Brian Hinton comments "'Enlightenment' is actually the opposite of what it sounds: it is full of doubt, not affirmation. 'I'm meditating and still I'm suffering.' He seems to be saying everything is a state of mind, you can choose to live in heaven or hell."

In a Rolling Stone review, John Swenson writes that the album Enlightenment is a sequel to Avalon Sunset and enables Morrison to have a new start (musically and spiritually). "Morrison is so pleased with his new start that he can even poke fun at his quest on the title track. 'I'm in the here and now and I'm meditating/And still I'm suffering but that's my problem,' he sings. 'Enlightenment, don't know what it is' – and he doesn't sound disturbed at all."

== Personnel on original release ==
- Van Morrison – vocals, harmonica
- Bernie Holland – guitar
- Georgie Fame — electric piano
- Alex Gifford – synthesizers
- Brian Odgers — bass guitar
- Dave Early — drums
