= Bright Side of the Road =

Single by Van Morrison

from the album Into the Music
- A-side: "Bright Side of the Road"
- B-side: "Rolling Hills"
- Released: 21 September 1979
- Recorded: Spring 1979, Record Plant, Sausalito, California
- Genre: Country rock
- Length: 3:47
- Label: Warner Bros.
- Songwriter: Van Morrison
- Producer: Van Morrison

Van Morrison singles chronology
"Kingdom Hall" (1979)	"Bright Side of the Road" (1979)	"Full Force Gale" (1979)

"Bright Side of the Road" is a song written by Northern Irish singer-songwriter Van Morrison and included on his 1979 album Into the Music. It was also one of the outtakes that made up the 1998 compilation album, The Philosopher's Stone. As a single "Bright Side of the Road" was released in September 1979 and charted at No. 48 in the Netherlands, No. 63 in the UK and just outside the Billboard Hot 100 in the US at No. 110. In 2020, the song reached its highest radio airplay chart position in Ireland, peaking at #2.

== Recording and composition ==
It was recorded in spring 1979 at Record Plant Studios in Sausalito, California, with Mick Glossop as engineer.

According to biographer Brian Hinton it is "an answer in song to 'The Dark End of the Street' and it is wonderfully light, in spirit and texture."

Record World said that it "has a light, keyboard-dominated instrumental track & restrained backup vocals."

== Other releases ==
"Bright Side of the Road" is featured as the opening tune on the 1990 compilation album The Best of Van Morrison. Another version of it was on the collection of outtakes on the 1998 compilation album The Philosopher's Stone. A live version as performed at the festival appeared on the 2006 limited edition CD Live at Austin City Limits Festival. As it appeared in the movie Fever Pitch in 1997, it is one of the songs included in Van Morrison's 2007 compilation album Van Morrison at the Movies - Soundtrack Hits. A remastered version of the song was included on another compilation album, Still on Top - The Greatest Hits that was released in 2007.

== Covers ==
"Bright Side of the Road" has been covered by many artists over the years, including: Shakira, Josh Graves, Hothouse Flowers, Raul Malo, Jerry Garcia Band, 001 Ensemble, Brendan Boyer, Antawn Jefferson, and David West.

Dan Penn, one of the writers of the song's inspiration The Dark End of the Street covered "Bright Side of the Road" on the 2003 tribute album Vanthology: A Tribute to Van Morrison.

On 20 January 2009, Shakira performed "Bright Side of the Road" at the Live at the Neighborhood Ball for President Barack Obama's inauguration ceremony celebrations.

== Personnel ==
- Van Morrison – vocals, guitar, harmonica
- Herbie Armstrong – guitar
- Pee Wee Ellis – tenor saxophone
- David Hayes – bass guitar
- Zakir Hussain – tabla
- Mark Isham – trumpet
- Mark Jordan – piano
- Katie Kissoon – backing vocals
- Toni Marcus – violin
- Peter Van Hooke – drums

== Personnel on The Philosopher's Stone ==
- Van Morrison – vocals, acoustic guitar, harmonica
- Herbie Armstrong – guitar
- David Hayes – bass
- Mark Jordan – piano
- Toni Marcus – violin
- Peter Van Hooke – drums

== Charts ==
Chart (1979)	Peak Position
Dutch Chart	48
UK Singles Chart	63
U.S. Billboard Bubbling Under the Hot 100	10

== Certifications ==
Region	Certification	Certified units/sales
New Zealand (RMNZ)	Gold	15,000^{‡}
United Kingdom (BPI)	Silver	200,000^{‡}
^{‡} Sales+streaming figures based on certification alone.
