= Real Real Gone =

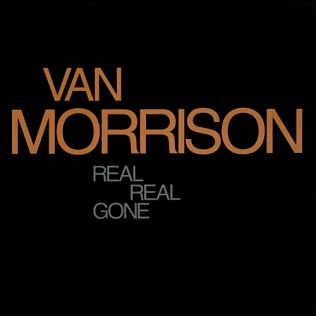

Single by Van Morrison

from the album Enlightenment
- A-side: "Real Real Gone"
- B-side: "Start All Over Again"
- Released: September 1990
- Recorded: October 1989
- Genre: Rhythm and blues
- Length: 3:43
- Label: Polydor
- Songwriter: Van Morrison
- Producer: Van Morrison

Van Morrison singles chronology
"Gloria" (1990)	"Real Real Gone" (1990)	"In the Days Before Rock 'n' Roll" (1990)

"Real Real Gone" is a hit single written by Northern Irish singer-songwriter Van Morrison and included on his 1990 album Enlightenment. It has remained a popular live performance tune and Morrison has included it on the set lists at many of his concerts since releasing it.

== Recording and composition ==
It was originally intended for the album Common One that was recorded in February 1980 at Super Bear Studios in France, but as the tempo became too lively with Herbie Armstrong's rhythm guitar, it didn't fit in with the other songs in the album. The song that is a track on the album, Enlightenment was recorded during the sessions that took place in 1989 with Mick Glossop as producer.

In a review for the album Enlightenment, Rolling Stone called the song "Real Real Gone" his most engaging R&B raveup since the days of 'Domino'"

== Other releases ==
Real Real Gone was also included in the 1993 compilation album The Best of Van Morrison Volume Two. It was included briefly during the "In the Garden" medley, before "You Send Me" on the live album A Night in San Francisco. In 1998 an outtake of it appeared on the compilation album The Philosopher's Stone. As it appeared in the movie Donovan Quick, it was included in the 2007 compilation album Van Morrison at the Movies - Soundtrack Hits. As a medley with "You Send Me", it was one of the songs performed when Morrison appeared at the Austin City Limits Festival in 2006 and was included on the limited edition album, Live at Austin City Limits Festival. A remastered version of this song is included in the 2007 compilation album, Still on Top - The Greatest Hits.

Real Real Gone was re-recorded with Michael Buble for the Duets: Re-working the Catalogue album, released in March 2015.

== Personnel on the original release ==
- Van Morrison – vocals
- Bernie Holland – guitar
- Steve Gregory – tenor saxophone
- Dave Bishop – baritone saxophone
- Malcolm Griffiths – trombone
- Georgie Fame – organ
- Steve Pearce – bass guitar
- Dave Early – drums

== Personnel on The Philosopher's Stone ==
- Van Morrison – vocals
- John Allair – organ
- Herbie Armstrong – rhythm guitar
- Mick Cox – guitar
- Pee Wee Ellis – tenor saxophone
- David Hayes – bass
- Mark Isham – trumpet, flugelhorn
- Peter Van Hooke – drums

== Covers ==
Tom Fogerty covered "Real Real Gone" on his 1981 album Deal It Out. Other covers of the song are by Bettye LaVette on Vanthology: A Tribute to Van Morrison and it was released as a single by Herbie Armstrong in 1981.

== Charts ==
Chart (1990)	Peak position
Australia (ARIA Charts)	117
US Mainstream Rock Tracks	18

== Sources ==
- Heylin, Clinton (2003). Can You Feel the Silence? Van Morrison: A New Biography, Chicago Review Press ISBN 1-55652-542-7
