= Queen of the Slipstream =

Single by Van Morrison

from the album Poetic Champions Compose
- A-side: "Queen of the Slipstream"
- B-side: "Spanish Steps"
- Released: April 1988
- Recorded: Summer 1987, The Wool Hall Studios, Beckington
- Genre: Celtic, folk rock
- Length: 4:55
- Label: Mercury
- Songwriter: Van Morrison
- Producer: Van Morrison

Van Morrison singles chronology
"Someone Like You" (1987)	"Queen of the Slipstream" (1988)	"I'll Tell Me Ma" (1988)

Official audio
- "Queen of the Slipstream" on YouTube

"Queen of the Slipstream" is a romantic ballad written by Northern Irish singer-songwriter Van Morrison and recorded on his 1987 album, Poetic Champions Compose. In 1988 it was released as a single in the UK, but did not chart.

== Recording and composition ==
"Queen of the Slipstream" was recorded at the same sessions as the other tracks that were released on Poetic Champions Compose in the summer of 1987 at the Wool Hall Studios, Beckington.

The song is a romantic ballad composed in the key of E major with a chord progression of E–G♯m–A. The bridge uses the progression of F♯m–C♯m–F♯m–E–F♯m–C♯m–F♯m–C♯m. It is written in 4/4 time and is played at a slow tempo.

Morrison used a full string orchestra for "Queen of the Slipstream", as Fiachra Trench, the arranger of the string parts, told biographer Peter Mills: "[Morrison's] string sessions in the USA had been for a smaller section than I used: I think we had about 26 players. The string session went very smoothly… On "Queen of the Slipstream" I reduced the strings to a chamber group for Van's harmonica solo and the second bridge which follows. Otherwise it's the full section." Trench went on to say: "Some of the string lines are derived from Neil Drinkwater's piano lines. I often use that technique when writing string arrangements, it helps to make the strings sound more part of the track, less like an overdub, less pop."

The lyrics quote two of Morrison's songs from his early career; "the slipstream" derives from "Astral Weeks" and the lines "I see you slipping and sliding in the snow… you come running to me, you'll come running to me" were used in "Come Running". "Slipping and a sliding" was also mentioned in his song "Brown Eyed Girl".

== Other releases ==
"Queen of the Slipstream" was one of the songs included on Van Morrison's first compilation album, The Best of Van Morrison that was released in 1990. It was included as a track on the movie hits compilation album, Van Morrison at the Movies – Soundtrack Hits that was released by EMI in February 2007. It is one of the songs on the Polydor UK October 2007 release, Still on Top – The Greatest Hits. The UK released three disc album is a limited edition.

== In the media ==
"Queen of the Slipstream" was a feature on the soundtrack of the 1990 film Extreme Close-Up.

It was a favorite song of actress Farrah Fawcett and was played during the opening credits for the documentary Farrah's Story shown on NBC on 15 May 2009. It also was played once again during the film.

On 10 January 2010 Mary Portas chose the track when appearing on Desert Island Discs.

== Personnel ==
- Van Morrison – guitar, harmonica, vocal
- Neil Drinkwater – piano
- Roy Jones – drums
- Steve Pearce – bass guitar
- Fiachra Trench – string arrangement

== Covers ==
Brian Kennedy performed a cover version of "Queen of the Slipstream" on Van Morrison's 1994 tribute album, No Prima Donna: The Songs of Van Morrison. This song was also performed by Son Seals on Van Morrison's third tribute album Vanthology: A Tribute to Van Morrison. It was covered by Kevin Welch on his album Millionaire. Fun recorded a cover version of "Queen of the Slipstream" on an iTunes Sessions album released in December 2012.
