= Why Must I Always Explain? =

Single by Van Morrison

from the album Hymns to the Silence
- A-side: "Why Must I Always Explain?"
- B-side: "So Complicated"
- Released: September 1991
- Recorded: 1990
- Genre: Celtic, Folk-rock
- Length: 3:50
- Label: Polydor
- Songwriter(s): Van Morrison
- Producer(s): Van Morrison

Van Morrison singles chronology
"I Can't Stop Loving You" (1990)	"Why Must I Always Explain?" (1991)	"Gloria" (1993)

"Why Must I Always Explain?" is a song written by Northern Irish singer-songwriter Van Morrison and included on his 1991 album, Hymns to the Silence. He used the same melody as on his 1971 song, "Tupelo Honey". He has often performed it live in his concerts over the years and occasionally has segued from one song to the next.

== Song meaning ==
Unlike other songs where Morrison has denied partly or wholly that the material was autobiographical, he has always admitted that this song is his answer to press, critics and fans about the demands of his life as a musician. He has explained that the song was "about these people who are non-producers, and who set themselves up as authorities on the people that are doing the work, like me...They become authorities, even though they know nothing about it."

In an interview with Victoria Clarke in 1993, he expressed that: "I don't really want to have to explain myself because I'm not really interested in doing that. If I was I would be somebody else. I'd be a politician or a celebrity. What I'm saying is, I'm just me. I make the records, I make this music and that's it, you know." The song contains the lines: "It's not righteous indignation that makes me complain/It's the fact that I always have to explain".

== Critical analysis ==
Steve Turner felt the "Irony of 'Why Must I Always Explain?' was that the thrust of his songwriting had always been explanation, giving his public detailed information about his problems, hardships and spiritual adventures. He had dropped hints about which authors he was reading and what he was listening to, and then appeared to be taken aback that his fans should ask for more." Biographer Johnny Rogan commented that "the song asked a question that begged the reply, 'But you've never explained anything!'"

== Personnel ==
- Van Morrison: vocals, electric guitar
- Neil Drinkwater: piano, accordion
- Georgie Fame: backing vocals
- Steve Gregory: flute
- Paul Robinson: drums
- Nicky Scott: bass
