= Someone like You (Van Morrison song) =

"Someone Like You"

Single by Van Morrison

from the album Poetic Champions Compose
- B-side: "Celtic Excavation"
- Released: November 1987
- Recorded: Summer 1987
- Studio: The Wool Hall, Beckington
- Genre: Smooth jazz
- Length: 4:06
- Label: Mercury
- Songwriter(s): Van Morrison
- Producer(s): Van Morrison

Van Morrison singles chronology
"Did Ye Get Healed?" (1987)	"Someone Like You" (1987)	"Queen of the Slipstream" (1988)

"Someone Like You" is a song written by Northern Irish singer-songwriter Van Morrison and recorded for his seventeenth studio album, Poetic Champions Compose (1987). It has become a wedding and film classic and the song subsequently furnished the framework for one of Morrison's most popular classics and love ballads, "Have I Told You Lately", released in 1989.

In 1987, the single charted at number 28 on the Billboard Adult Contemporary chart in the US. In 2019, it peaked at #1 on the Ireland radio airplay chart.

== Recording ==
"Someone Like You" was recorded in the summer of 1987 at Wool Hall Studios in Beckington, Somerset with Mick Glossop as engineer.

== Other releases ==
The song was released again on two of Morrison's compilation albums in 2007: on the compilation album Van Morrison at the Movies – Soundtrack Hits and as a remastered version on the album Still on Top – The Greatest Hits.

== Films featuring "Someone Like You" ==
- Only the Lonely (1991)
- Prelude to a Kiss (1992)
- French Kiss (1995)
- One Fine Day (1996)
- Someone Like You (2001)
- Bridget Jones's Diary (2001)
- American Sniper (2014)

== Personnel ==
- Van Morrison – vocals, guitar
- Neil Drinkwater – piano
- Steve Pearce – bass guitar
- Roy Jones – drums, percussion
- Fiachra Trench – string arrangement

== Cover versions ==
"Someone Like You" is a popularly performed cover song, with the best-known versions by Dina Carroll, Vanessa L. Williams, Shawn Colvin and John Waite.
