= Poetic Champions Compose =

Studio album by Van Morrison
- Released: September 1987
- Recorded: Summer 1987
- Studios: The Wool Hall (Beckington, UK); Townhouse (London, UK)
- Genres: Rock; jazz; Celtic
- Length: 47:45
- Label: Mercury
- Producer: Van Morrison

Van Morrison chronology
No Guru, No Method, No Teacher (1986)	Poetic Champions Compose (1987)	Irish Heartbeat (1988)

Singles from Poetic Champions Compose
- 1. "Did Ye Get Healed?" b/w "Allow Me" Released: August 1987; 2. "Someone Like You" b/w "Celtic Excavation" Released: November 1987; 3. "Queen of the Slipstream" b/w "Spanish Steps" Released: April 1988

Poetic Champions Compose is the seventeenth studio album by Northern Irish singer-songwriter Van Morrison, released in 1987 on Mercury Records. It received generally positive reviews from critics, most of whom viewed it as adequate mood music.

== Recording and composition ==
Poetic Champions Compose was recorded in summer 1987 at Wool Hall Studios in Beckington with Mick Glossop as engineer.

Morrison was quoted during this time period as saying "Psychologists will tell you that artists have to be in a state of despair before they produce great work, but I don't think that... In my case I know it doesn't create better work. I produce better work if I'm content. I can't create that feeling if I'm in a state of conflict." Johnny Rogan felt that it emphasized his "commitments to creating a more contemplative style of music" and that what came across most in the album was "Morrison's heightened sense of ecstasy, purification and renewal."

Morrison originally intended the album to consist wholly of jazz instrumental works, but later said that "when I did three numbers I thought, 'No, I don't wanna do that,' and changed my mind." Nonetheless, each side of the album opens with an instrumental, "Spanish Steps" and "Celtic Excavation", and the album closes with another, "Allow Me". As described by Brian Hinton: "It is an album which is more than the sum of its parts, exuding an overall sense of calm and optimism."

According to Hinton, "Spanish Steps" is "a tune as calm as a millpond." Morrison's philosophy reading list is evident in "Alan Watts Blues", and Socrates and Plato are mentioned in "I Forgot That Love Existed", as well as Rudolf Steiner's pronouncement about the importance of "thinking with the heart and feeling with the mind". Fiachra Trench writes the string and woodwind arrangement on "The Mystery", which strikes a spiritual theme. The album features two love songs that have had an enduring popularity, "Queen of the Slipstream" and "Someone Like You". The only song not penned by Morrison is the Negro spiritual "Sometimes I Feel Like a Motherless Child". Writes Hinton, "It is 'Mother Ireland' whom Van is missing and his world weary vocals are like sobs of pain." "Give Me My Rapture" and "Did Ye Get Healed?" are powerful and optimistic statements of the deep spiritual priorities in Morrison's music; the latter became a concert staple.

== Critical reception ==
Professional ratings
Review scores
Source	Rating
AllMusic	4/5 stars
Audio	A
Chicago Sun-Times	3/4 stars
Encyclopedia of Popular Music	3/5 stars
The Rolling Stone Album Guide	2/5 stars
The Village Voice	B+

In a contemporary review for The Village Voice, music critic Robert Christgau wrote that Poetic Champions Compose is somewhat dull but tasteful "dinner music" because "in his current spiritual state", Morrison "doesn't much care about interesting. He just wants to roll on, undulating from rhythmic hill to melodic dale." Rolling Stone magazine's Jimmy Guterman wrote that some of the music and lyrics sound boring and do nothing but set a mood, but even without any progression by Morrison, the album is "another worthy installment in his series of soulful, meditative explorations". Don McLeese from the Chicago Sun-Times said most of the songs "could be categorized as mood music. But musical moods are rarely this sublime". In a rave review, Audio magazine hailed it as a prime example of rock music being rendered on the then-new CD format, as the music is "grounded in superb instrumental and vocal performances captured in a way which reflects a sonic reality rather than a fabrication."

Poetic Champions Compose was voted the 21st best album of 1987 in The Village Voice's annual Pazz & Jop critics poll. In a retrospective review for AllMusic, Stephen Thomas Erlewine said only a few songs distinguish themselves from the album's dulcet, arty mood and mid-tempo balladry, but concluded that "this record is warmer, stronger than many of its predecessors, one of his highlights from the '80s." Colin Larkin highlighted "Spanish Steps", "Sometimes I Feel Like a Motherless Child", and "Someone Like You" in The Encyclopedia of Popular Music (2006), finding the songs "moving". Rob Sheffield was less enthusiastic in The Rolling Stone Album Guide (2004), deeming the album one of several "cranky self-imitations" that plagued Morrison's "painful slump in the '80s".

== Track listing ==
All songs written by Van Morrison except as noted.

=== Side one ===
1. "Spanish Steps" – 5:20
2. "The Mystery" – 5:16
3. "Queen of the Slipstream" – 4:55
4. "I Forgot That Love Existed" – 4:17
5. "Sometimes I Feel Like a Motherless Child" (traditional) – 4:27

=== Side two ===
1. "Celtic Excavation" – 3:17
2. "Someone Like You" – 4:06
3. "Alan Watts Blues" – 4:24
4. "Give Me My Rapture" – 3:44
5. "Did Ye Get Healed?" – 4:06
6. "Allow Me" – 3:53

== Personnel ==
=== Musicians ===
- Van Morrison – lead vocals, guitar, harmonica, alto saxophone
- Neil Drinkwater – piano, synthesizer
- Martin Drover – trumpet, flugelhorn
- Roy Jones – drums, percussion
- Steve Pearce – bass
- Mick Cox – lead guitar on "I Forgot That Love Existed" & "Alan Watts Blues"
- June Boyce – backing vocals
- Fiachra Trench – organ on "Give Me My Rapture"
- Richie Buckley – soprano saxophone, flute on "Sometimes I Feel Like a Motherless Child" & "The Mystery"
- Kate St. John – oboe on "Sometimes I Feel Like a Motherless Child" & "The Mystery"

=== Production ===
- Producer: Van Morrison
- Engineer: Mick Glossop
- Photography: Steve Rapport, Direct Art Green Ink.
- Coordination: Sian Williams
- String and Woodwind arrangements: Fiachra Trench
- Synthesizer Programming: Paul Ridout

== Charts ==
Chart (1987)	Peak position
Australia (Kent Music Report)	25
American Albums Chart	90
United Kingdom (Official Charts Company)	22

== Certifications ==
Certifications for Poetic Champions Compose
Region	Certification	Certified units/sales
Canada (Music Canada)	Gold	50,000^{^}
^{^} Shipments figures based on certification alone.
