= Cleaning Windows =

Single by Van Morrison

from the album Beautiful Vision
- A-side: "Cleaning Windows"
- B-side: "It's All in the Game" (U.K.)/"Aryan Mist" (Spain)/"Scandinavia"
- Released: March 1982
- Recorded: 27 July 1981 at Record Plant Studios in Sausalito, California
- Genre: R&B; soul; blues; rock
- Length: 4:43
- Label: Mercury
- Songwriter(s): Van Morrison
- Producer(s): Van Morrison

Van Morrison singles chronology
| "You Make Me Feel So Free" (1980) | "Cleaning Windows" (1982) | "Scandinavia" (1982) |

Single sleeve

"Cleaning Windows" is a song written by the Northern Irish singer-songwriter Van Morrison, recorded on his 1982 album Beautiful Vision.

== Recording and composition ==
The version of "Cleaning Windows" that was released as a single and was included on the 1982 album was recorded at the Record Plant Studios in Sausalito, California on 27 July 1981.

The biographically based song chronicles a cheerful and nostalgic look back at a carefree time in Morrison's life when he was still a part-time musician, playing saxophone with Clubsound at the weekend following his lessons with teacher and friend George Cassidy (jazz musician). He names his favourite musical artists of the time such as Muddy Waters, Jimmie Rodgers, and Lead Belly, along with author Jack Kerouac and his books The Dharma Bums and On the Road, and even Buddhist judge Christmas Humphreys and his "... book on Zen." He was soon to leave his boyhood behind and after joining the Monarchs, spend several months in Scotland, Germany and England touring with them as the International Monarchs.

According to Steve Turner in "Cleaning Windows" "Van sketched the details of his life during 1961 and 1962, and captured the balance between his contentment at work and his aspirations to learn more about music. It conveyed the impression that his happiness with the mundane routine of smoking Woodbine cigarettes, eating Paris buns and drinking lemonade was made possible by the promise that at the end of the day he could enter the world of books and records..."

John Milward wrote in a 1982 Rolling Stone review: "Hung on a metaphor as clear as glass, 'Cleaning Windows' applies one night's notions to a lifetime. It's the LP's musical highlight as well, with a guitar-organ combination reminiscent of the Band, and a jumping sax solo to boot. Shaking himself awake each morning, the dedicated romantic looks to see how he's grown. Peppered with fraternal details that recall 'And It Stoned Me,' 'Cleaning Windows' boldly restates the self-help maxim that you are your own best friend."

Paul Macinnis with The Guardian wrote: "The message of the song is simple – the window cleaner's happy in his work – and the lyrical vignettes combined with delicate, upbeat R&B (with Mark "That ain't working" Knopfler on guitar) convey that feeling wonderfully."

In his descriptions of the songs on Beautiful Vision, Erik Hage wrote that this song is an exception as it is "stuffed with images and remembrances ... and is therefore somewhat anomalous to the rest of the record, which took up more esoteric and spiritual matters." AllMusic's Bill Janovitz, on the other hand, suggests a spiritual reading of the song, with Morrison's literal image of "cleaning windows" doubling as "a metaphor for Zen-like clarity, seeing the essence of life via the repetition of basic chores."

== Release ==
"Cleaning Windows" was released as a single in March 1982 but was not promoted as a 45 single by Mercury records and therefore did not chart. Writer Howard A. DeWitt felt that it would have charted "because it generated a response similar to "Domino" in Van's 1982 concerts". ("Domino" charted at #9 in America in 1970.)

Record World said that Morrison is "at his best, backed by a crack rhythm section."

== Other releases ==
Morrison chose "Cleaning Windows" to be one of the songs included on The Best of Van Morrison, his first "Best of" album, which was released in 1990. A live version was performed on the 1984 album Live at the Grand Opera House Belfast. As performed at the Austin City Limits Festival on 15 September 2006 it is included on the limited-edition album Live at Austin City Limits Festival. It has been re-mastered in 2007 and included on the compilation album Still on Top – The Greatest Hits. "Cleaning Windows" is also one of the songs performed in 1989, on Morrison's second video Van Morrison: The Concert, released in 1990. A previously unreleased version of this song features on the 2008 reissue of the 1994 live double album A Night in San Francisco.

== Personnel ==
- Van Morrison - vocals
- John Allair - organ
- Pee Wee Ellis - tenor and baritone saxophones
- Mark Isham - trumpet
- Mark Knopfler - guitar
- Gary Mallaber - drums
- Chris Michie - lead guitar
- Michele Segan - percussion
- Rob Wasserman - bass

== Covers ==
Mark Arneson covered it on the 2005 tribute album Smooth Sax Tribute to Van Morrison. Pee Wee Ellis included a cover on his 1994 album Sepia Tonality. Barrence Whitfield and Tom Russell covered "Cleaning Windows" on Hillbilly Voodoo.
