= Live at Austin City Limits Festival =

Live album by Van Morrison
- Released: November 2006
- Recorded: 15 September 2006
- Genre: Country
- Length: 97:52
- Label: Exile Productions Ltd.
- Producer: Van Morrison

Van Morrison chronology
Pay the Devil (2006)	Live at Austin City Limits Festival (2006)	Van Morrison at the Movies - Soundtrack Hits (2007)

Live at Austin City Limits Festival by Northern Irish singer-songwriter Van Morrison is a limited edition live album recorded from the Austin City Limits Festival concert at which he was the first night headliner on 15 September 2006. It has only been made available at live Van Morrison concerts and from the Van Morrison official website.

The September appearance at the Austin City Limits Festival was at the closing end of a tour to promote his 2006 released country and western album Pay the Devil. The tour had begun on 7 March 2006 with Morrison's first ever concert at the famed Ryman Auditorium.

His performance at the festival was rated as one of the 10 Best Shows at Austin City Limits by Rolling Stone and the two disc CD features the complete concert.

== Track listing ==
(All songs by Van Morrison, except as noted)

=== Disc one ===
1. "Back on Top" – 5:45
2. "Big Blue Diamonds" (Earl J. Carson) – 3:06
3. "Playhouse" – 5:30
4. "Days Like This" – 3:02
5. "Muleskinner Blues" (Jimmie Rodgers, Georgie Vaughn) – 5:49
6. "In the Midnight" – 5:24
7. "Bright Side of the Road" – 4:29
8. "Don't You Make Me High" (Daniel Barker, Ken Harris) – 3:05
9. "Cleaning Windows" – 4:37
10. "I Can't Stop Loving You" (Don Gibson) – 5:32

=== Disc two ===
1. "Real Real Gone/You Send Me" (Morrison), (Sam Cooke) – 5:36
2. "Saint James Infirmary" (traditional arranged by Morrison) – 5:28
3. "Moondance" – 6:20
4. "It's All in the Game/You Know What They're Writing About/Make It Real One More Time" (Charles Dawes, Carl Sigman), (Morrison) – 7:21
5. "Precious Time" – 3:52
6. "Don't Start Crying Now/Custard Pie" (James Moore, Jerry West), (Sonny Terry) – 5:23
7. "Wild Night" – 4:18
8. "Brown Eyed Girl" – 4:21
9. "Gloria" – 8:46

== Personnel ==
- Van Morrison – vocals, alto saxophone, acoustic-electric guitar, harmonica
- Tony Fitzgibbon – violin
- John Allair – Hammond organ
- Ned Edwards – electric guitar
- John Platania – electric guitar
- Cindy Cashdollar – pedal steel, dobro
- David Hayes – bass
- Neal Wilkinson – drums
- Crawford Bell – backing vocals, acoustic guitar, trumpet
- Karen Hammill – backing vocals
- Janeen Daly – backing vocals
