= Too Long in Exile =

Studio album by Van Morrison
- Released: 1 June 1993
- Studios: The Wool Hall, Bath, England; Record Plant, Sausalito, California
- Genres: Urban blues, soul jazz
- Length: 77:04
- Label: Polydor
- Producer: Van Morrison

Van Morrison chronology
The Best of Van Morrison Volume Two (1993)	Too Long in Exile (1993)	A Night in San Francisco (1994)

Singles from Too Long in Exile
- 1. "Gloria" b/w "It Must Be You" Released: May 1993

Too Long in Exile is the twenty-second studio album by Northern Irish singer-songwriter Van Morrison. The album was produced by Morrison and draws on urban blues and soul jazz sounds, including collaborations with John Lee Hooker and Georgie Fame. Released in 1993 by Polydor Records, Too Long in Exile received positive reviews from most critics and reached #4 on the UK Albums Chart. It reached #29 in the US, Van Morrison's highest ranking since 1978's Wavelength (#28) and until 1999's Back on Top (#28).

== Critical reception ==
Professional ratings
Review scores
Source	Rating
AllMusic	2/5 stars
Chicago Tribune	3.5/4 stars
Entertainment Weekly	B−
Rolling Stone	3.5/5 stars
The Rolling Stone Album Guide	3.5/5 stars
Select	2/5 medals
The Village Voice	A−

Too Long in Exile received generally positive reviews. Rock critic Peter Paphides wrote in Melody Maker at the time, "never has one man's regression therapy sounded this exhilarating", while Gavin Martin from the Daily Mirror remarked that Morrison has "rediscovered his 'earthy, elemental fire'. He is still the foremost blues auteur." Chicago Tribune critic Greg Kot found his singing "freer than ever" and most of the performances "joyful", praising the music's urban blues and soul-jazz sounds. Kot said the album is a "casual tour de force", with the exception of the cover song "Moody's Mood for Love", which he felt would nevertheless be enjoyed by fans of Morrison's "Moondance" (1970). In The Village Voice, Robert Christgau said Morrison draws on the spiritual guidance of blues greats for the album's best material, highlighting the collaborations with John Lee Hooker on "Gloria" and "Wasted Years", although he lamented some aimless songs such as "In the Forest".

In The Rolling Stone Album Guide (2004), Rob Sheffield said Too Long in Exile was the "breeziest" of Morrison's post-1980s albums. In a less enthusiastic review, AllMusic's Bil Carpenter wrote in retrospect that it was "an earthly departure from his previous two pop efforts", featuring a "delicious" cover of "Lonely Avenue" and impressive duets with Hooker but also a "mundane" title track. Rolling Stone included the album in its list of the "Essential Recordings of the 90's".

== Track listing ==
All songs written by Van Morrison except as indicated.

1. "Too Long in Exile" – 6:18
2. "Big Time Operators" – 6:03
3. "Lonely Avenue/You Give Me Nothing but the Blues" (Doc Pomus, Morrison) – 6:24
4. "Ball & Chain" – 5:36
5. "In the Forest" – 4:38
6. "Till We Get the Healing Done" – 8:29
7. "Gloria" – 5:19
8. "Good Morning Little Schoolgirl" (Sonny Boy Williamson) – 4:07
9. "Wasted Years" – 3:57
10. "The Lonesome Road" (Nathaniel Shilkret, Gene Austin) – 3:16
11. "Moody's Mood for Love" (James Moody, Dorothy Fields, Jimmy McHugh) – 2:52
12. "Close Enough for Jazz" – 2:39
13. "Before the World Was Made" (text by William Butler Yeats, adapted by Morrison, music by Kenny Craddock) – 4:24
14. "I'll Take Care of You" (Brook Benton) – 5:19
15. "Instrumental/Tell Me What You Want" – 8:08

== Personnel ==
- Van Morrison – vocals, electric guitar, acoustic guitar, alto saxophone, harmonica
- John Lee Hooker – vocals and electric guitar on "Gloria" and "Wasted Years"
- Georgie Fame – Hammond organ, backing vocals
- Ronnie Johnson – electric guitar
- Nicky Scott – bass guitar
- Candy Dulfer – alto saxophone
- Kate St John – tenor saxophone, English Horn
- Teena Lyle – backing vocals, Hammond organ, percussion, vibraphone
- Jonn Savannah – backing vocals, Hammond organ
- Geoff Dunn – drums
- Howard Francis – Hammond organ, piano
- Paul Robinson – drums
- John Allair – Hammond organ
- Richard Cousins – bass guitar
- Kevin Hayes – drums

== Charts ==
=== Weekly charts ===
Chart (1993)	Peak position
Australian Albums (ARIA)	4
Canada Top Albums/CDs (RPM)	6
Dutch Albums (Album Top 100)	21
German Albums (Offizielle Top 100)	47
Irish Albums (IFPI)	5
New Zealand Albums (RMNZ)	3
Norwegian Albums (VG-lista)	2
Swedish Albums (Sverigetopplistan)	17
Swiss Albums (Schweizer Hitparade)	17
UK Albums (Official Charts)	4
US Billboard 200	29

=== Year-end charts ===
Chart (1993)	Position
New Zealand Albums (RMNZ)	27

== Certifications ==
Region	Certification	Certified units/sales
Australia (ARIA)	Gold	35,000^{^}
Canada (Music Canada)	Gold	50,000^{^}
New Zealand (RMNZ)	Gold	7,500^{^}
Norway (IFPI Norway)	Gold	25,000^{*}
United Kingdom (BPI)	Silver	60,000^{^}
^{*} Sales figures based on certification alone.^{^} Shipments figures based on certification alone.

== Bibliography ==
- Hinton, Brian (1997). Celtic Crossroads: The Art of Van Morrison, Sanctuary, ISBN 1-86074-169-X
