= Did Ye Get Healed? =

Single by Van Morrison

from the album Poetic Champions Compose
- A-side: "Did Ye Get Healed?"
- B-side: "Allow Me"
- Released: 1987
- Recorded: Summer 1987
- Genre: Celtic, folk-rock, R&B
- Length: 4:06
- Label: Mercury
- Songwriter(s): Van Morrison
- Producer(s): Van Morrison

Van Morrison singles chronology
"Got to Go Back" (1986)	"Did Ye Get Healed?" (1987)	"Someone Like You" (1987)

"Did Ye Get Healed?" is a song written by Northern Irish singer-songwriter Van Morrison and recorded on his 1987 album, Poetic Champions Compose. It was also released as a single in 1987.

Morrison biographer Johnny Rogan describes the song as "A powerful statement of transcendence confirming that the spiritual dimension to his (Morrison's) music was now an overwhelming priority."

== Appearance on other albums ==
- It was one of the songs included on Van Morrison's first compilation album, The Best of Van Morrison that was released in 1990 and was one of the best-selling albums of the 1990s.
- "Did Ye Get Healed?" is one of the songs featured on the compilation album Still on Top - The Greatest Hits.
- The song appears on the 1994 live album A Night in San Francisco.

== Personnel ==
- Van Morrison – alto saxophone, vocals
- June Boyce – backing vocals
- Neil Drinkwater – piano
- Martin Drover – flugelhorn
- Roy Jones – drums
- Steve Pearce – bass guitar
