= A Night in San Francisco =

1994 live album by Van Morrison

Live album by Van Morrison
- Released: 17 May 1994; June 2008 (Reissue)
- Recorded: 12–18 December 1993
- Genre: Jazz, blues
- Length: 147:26
- Label: Polydor
- Producer: Van Morrison

Van Morrison chronology
Too Long in Exile (1993)	A Night in San Francisco (1994)	Days Like This (1995)

A Night in San Francisco is a live album by Northern Irish singer-songwriter Van Morrison, released in 1994. Guest artists were Candy Dulfer, John Lee Hooker, Junior Wells and Jimmy Witherspoon as well as Morrison's daughter, Shana Morrison. James Hunter and Brian Kennedy helped out with the vocals and Georgie Fame was also present.

The June 2008 reissued and remastered version of the album contains a live take of the Morrison song "Cleaning Windows". "I'll Take Care of You/It's a Man's Man's Man's World" from this album was listed as one of the standout tracks from a set of six reissued Van Morrison albums (on Universal Music).

== Recording ==
The album is compiled of live performances at the Masonic Auditorium, San Francisco, California on 18 December 1993 and the Mystic Theater, Petaluma, California, on 12 December 1993. The bonus track "Cleaning Windows/The Street Only Knew Your Name" was recorded on 17 December 1993 at the Masonic Auditorium San Francisco, California.

== Composition ==
"In the Garden/You Send Me/Allegheny" was nominated for Best Male Rock Vocal Performance in the 37th Annual Grammy Awards. Most of the songs were medleys with several vocalists performing on each.

== Reception ==
Professional ratings
Review scores
Source	Rating
Allmusic	link
Entertainment Weekly	B link
The Independent	(n/r favourable) link
Music Week	3/5 stars
Rolling Stone	link

Richard Williams of The Independent wrote in his review that: "A Night in San Francisco...goes for the heart of the stuff that first inspired Morrison: rhythm and blues. He is in electrifyingly authoritative form, bringing all his experience to some of his finest songs."

== Track listing ==
All songs written by Van Morrison unless noted.

=== Disc one ===
1. "Did Ye Get Healed?" – 4:18
2. "It's All in the Game/Make It Real One More Time" (Charles Dawes, Carl Sigman)/(Morrison) – 4:19
3. "I've Been Working" – 3:24
4. "I Forgot That Love Existed" (Morrison) – 6:17
5. "Vanlose Stairway/Trans-Euro Train/A Fool for You" (Morrison)/(Morrison)/(Ray Charles) – 6:55
6. "You Make Me Feel So Free" – 3:14
7. "Beautiful Vision" – 4:11
8. "See Me Through/Soldier of Fortune/Thank You" (Morrison)/(Morrison)/(Sylvester Stewart) – 10:18
9. "Ain't That Loving You Baby?" (Ivory Joe Hunter, Clyde Otis) – 4:44
10. "Stormy Monday/Have You Ever Loved a Woman?/No Rollin' Blues" (T-Bone Walker)/(Billy Myles)/(Jimmy Witherspoon) – 6:08
11. "Help Me" (Sonny Boy Williamson II) – 6:10
  - Organ solo from "Green Onions" (Booker T. Jones, Steve Cropper, Lewie Steinberg, Al Jackson Jr.)
12. "Good Morning Little Schoolgirl" (Sonny Boy Williamson I) – 3:33
13. "Tupelo Honey" – 4:01
14. "Moondance/My Funny Valentine" (Morrison)/(Richard Rodgers, Lorenz Hart) – 9:09

=== Disc two ===
1. "Jumpin' With Symphony Sid" (King Pleasure, Lester Young) – 4:47
2. "It Fills You Up" – 4:43
3. "I'll Take Care of You"/It's a Man's Man's Man's World" (Brook Benton) / (James Brown, Betty Newsome) – 16:23
4. "Lonely Avenue/Be-Bop-A-Lula/4 O'Clock in the Morning (Try for Sleep)/Family Affair/You Give Me Nothing but the Blues/When Will I Become A Man?/Sooner Or Later/Down the Line" (Doc Pomus) / (Gene Vincent, Bill Davis) / (Morrison, John Platania) / (Sylvester Stewart) / (Morrison) / (Erica Ehm, Tim Thorney) / (Vernon, Ross, Shaw) / (Roy Orbison) – 14:51
5. "So Quiet in Here/That's Where It's At" (Morrison) / (James Alexander, Sam Cooke) – 5:00
6. "In the Garden/Real Real Gone/Allegheny/You Send Me" (Morrison) / (Morrison) / (trad.) / (Sam Cooke) – 9:41
7. "Have I Told You Lately" – 3:51
8. "Shakin' All Over/Gloria" (Johnny Kidd) / (Morrison) – 11:29

=== Bonus track (2008 CD reissue) ===
1. "Cleaning Windows" – 3:46

== Personnel ==
- Van Morrison – vocals, guitar, alto saxophone, harmonica
- Haji Ahkba – flugelhorn, background vocals
- Geoff Dunn – drums
- Georgie Fame – vocals, organ, background vocals
- Ronnie Johnson – guitar
- Teena Lyle – vibraphone, percussion, recorder, background vocals
- Jonn Savannah – vocals, piano, background vocals
- Nicky Scott – bass guitar, background vocals
- Kate St John – soprano and tenor saxophones, oboe

With

- James Hunter – vocals, guitar, background vocals
- Brian Kennedy – vocals, background vocals

Special guests

- Candy Dulfer – alto saxophone, background vocals
- John Lee Hooker – vocals on "Gloria"
- Shana Morrison – vocals on "Beautiful Vision"
- Junior Wells – vocals, harmonica on "Help Me" and "Good Morning Little School Girl"
- Jimmy Witherspoon – vocals on "Have You Ever Loved a Woman?", "No Rollin' Blues", "When Will I Become a Man?" and "Sooner Or Later"

== Charts ==
Album – Billboard (North America)

Year	Chart	Position
1994	The Billboard 200	125

Album – UK Albums Chart (United Kingdom)

Year	Chart	Position
1994	UK Album Chart	8
