= On Hyndford Street =

Song about the street in Belfast, Ireland

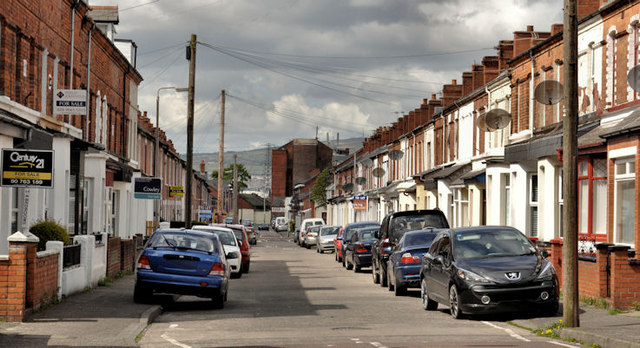
- Hyndford Street, east Belfast

Song by Van Morrison

from the album Hymns to the Silence
- Released: September 1991
- Length: 5:17
- Label: Polydor
- Songwriter: Van Morrison
- Producer: Van Morrison

"On Hyndford Street" is a song written by Northern Irish singer-songwriter Van Morrison, and was released on his 1991 double album Hymns to the Silence.

On 2020, for Morrison's 75th birthday celebration, County Down-born jazz drummer and composer David Lyttle covered the song featuring actor and fellow Northern Irishman Liam Neeson. Neeson was interviewed about his collaboration and said he "honoured".

== Background ==
Van Morrison grew up on Hyndford Street, East Belfast, and reflects on his childhood in "On Hyndford Street".

Fellow musician and best friend of Morrison George Cassidy grew up with him on Hyndford Street, and taught him music reading, as well as the tenor saxophone lessons. Morrison described Cassidy as a "big inspiration".
