= Inarticulate Speech of the Heart =

Studio album by Van Morrison
- Released: March 1983
- Recorded: 1982
- Studios: Townhouse (London, UK); Record Plant (Sausalito); Harbour Sound (Sausalito); Tres Virgos (San Rafael); Lombard Sound (Dublin, Ireland)
- Genres: Celtic, jazz
- Length: 47:10
- Label: Mercury
- Producer: Van Morrison

Van Morrison chronology
Beautiful Vision (1982)	Inarticulate Speech of the Heart (1983)	Live at the Grand Opera House Belfast (1984)

Singles from Inarticulate Speech of the Heart
- 1. "Cry for Home" b/w "Summertime in England" Released: February 1983; 2. "Celtic Swing" b/w "Mr. Thomas" Released: May 1983

Inarticulate Speech of the Heart is the fourteenth studio album by Northern Irish singer-songwriter Van Morrison, released in 1983. Morrison said he arrived at the title from a Shavian saying: "that idea of communicating with as little articulation as possible, at the same time being emotionally articulate". As his last album for Warner Bros. Records, he decided to do an album which had more than the usual complement of instrumental tracks. As he explained in 1984, "Sometimes when I'm playing something, I'm just sort of humming along with it, and that's got a different vibration than an actual song. So the instrumentals just come from trying to get that form of expression, which is not the same as writing a song." Although not expanded upon, of note is that a special thanks is given to L. Ron Hubbard in the liner notes. The reissued and remastered version of the album contains alternative takes of "Cry for Home" and "Inarticulate Speech of the Heart No. 2".

== Recording ==
The recording sessions took place in California, Dublin, and a series of marathon sessions at the Town House in London. Morrison played piano, guitar and saxophone on these sessions. Two Irish musicians played on the album (Arty McGlynn and Davy Spillane) and overall the music had a strong Celtic colouring. Four of the songs were instrumentals.

== Critical reception ==
Professional ratings
Review scores
Source	Rating
AllMusic	4/5 stars
Robert Christgau	B−
Rolling Stone	4/5 stars

The Chicago Sun Times gave the album an honourable mention in their list of the top ten albums of 1983. Richard S. Ginell wrote later in AllMusic, "The mood is predominantly mellow but never flaccid or complacent; there is a radiance that glows throughout ... The record sold poorly, but many of those who bought it consider it one of the most cherished items in their Van Morrison collections."

== Track listing ==
All tracks are written by Van Morrison.

Inarticulate Speech of the Heart track listing
No.	Title	Length
1.	"Higher than the World"	3:42
2.	"Connswater"	4:09
3.	"River of Time"	3:02
4.	"Celtic Swing"	5:03
5.	"Rave On, John Donne"	5:12
6.	"Inarticulate Speech of the Heart No. 1"	4:53
7.	"Irish Heartbeat"	4:40
8.	"The Street Only Knew Your Name"	3:36
9.	"Cry for Home"	3:44
10.	"Inarticulate Speech of the Heart No. 2"	3:53
11.	"September Night"	5:16
12.	"Cry for Home" (CD bonus song, alternate take)	3:49
13.	"Inarticulate Speech of the Heart No. 2" (CD bonus song, alternate take)	4:48

== Personnel ==
- Van Morrison – guitar, piano, Fender Rhodes, alto saxophone, vocals
- David Hayes – bass guitar
- Mark Isham – synthesizer, trumpet
- John Allair – Hammond organ, piano, Fender Rhodes
- Pee Wee Ellis – tenor saxophone, soprano saxophone, flute
- Tom Donlinger – percussion, drums
- Mihr Un Nisa Douglass – backing vocals
- Stephanie Douglass – backing vocals
- Pauline Lozana – backing vocals
- Arty McGlynn – acoustic guitar
- Davy Spillane – Uilleann pipes, alto flute
- Chris Michie – guitar
- Annie Stocking – backing vocals
- Bianca Thornton – backing vocals
- Peter Van Hooke – drums, tambourine

== Charts ==
=== Weekly charts ===
Weekly chart performance for Inarticulate Speech of the Heart
Chart (1983–1984)	Peak position
Australian Albums (Kent Music Report)	21
Canada Top Albums/CDs (RPM)	69
Dutch Albums (Album Top 100)	14
New Zealand Albums (RMNZ)	4
Norwegian Albums (VG-lista)	17
UK Albums (Official Charts)	24
US Billboard 200	116

=== Year-end charts ===
Year-end chart performance for Inarticulate Speech of the Heart
Chart (1983)	Position
New Zealand Albums (RMNZ)	15

== Certifications ==
Certifications for Inarticulate Speech of the Heart
Region	Certification	Certified units/sales
New Zealand (RMNZ)	Platinum	15,000^{^}
^{^} Shipments figures based on certification alone.
