= Live at the Grand Opera House Belfast =

Live album by Van Morrison
- Released: February 1984; Reissued June 2008
- Recorded: 11 & 12 March 1983
- Venue: Grand Opera House, Belfast
- Genre: Celtic, rock
- Length: 51:57
- Label: Mercury (Original release); Polydor (All reissues since 1989)
- Producer: Van Morrison

Van Morrison chronology
Inarticulate Speech of the Heart (1983)	Live at the Grand Opera House Belfast (1984)	A Sense of Wonder (1984)

Singles from Live at the Grand Opera House Belfast
- 1. "Dweller on the Threshold" b/w "Northern Muse (Solid Ground)" Released: April 1984

Professional ratings
Review scores
Source	Rating
Allmusic	3/5 stars
Robert Christgau	(B)

Live at the Grand Opera House Belfast is a live album by Northern Irish singer-songwriter Van Morrison, released in 1984. It was recorded from four live shows in March 1983 at the Grand Opera House, Belfast, Northern Ireland (Morrison's birthplace). The album was composed of songs from Morrison's last four recordings. It is the second live album Morrison released, following 10 years after It's Too Late to Stop Now.

This album was remastered and reissued by Polydor Records on 30 June 2008. "Rave On John Donne/Rave On Part Two" from this album was listed as one of the standout tracks from the six-album reissue.

At these concerts, the song "Summertime in England" was also recorded and released as the B-side and extra track on the 45 and 12-inch single versions of "Cry for Home."

== Track listing ==
All songs by Van Morrison unless stated otherwise

1. "Into the Mystic (Instrumental)/Inarticulate Speech of the Heart" – 1:06
2. "Dweller on the Threshold" (Morrison, Murphy) – 3:38
3. "It's All in the Game/You Know What They're Writing About/Make It Real One More Time" – 7:09 (Charles Dawes, Carl Sigman)/(Morrison)
4. "She Gives Me Religion" – 4:35
5. "Haunts of Ancient Peace" – 6:25
6. "Full Force Gale" – 2:22
7. "Beautiful Vision" – 3:34
8. "Vanlose Stairway" – 5:29
9. "Rave On John Donne/Rave On Part Two" – 9:09
10. "Northern Muse (Solid Ground)" – 3:45
11. "Cleaning Windows" – 4:56

== Personnel ==
- Van Morrison – vocals, guitar, electric piano, alto saxophone
- Pee Wee Ellis – tenor saxophone, flute, backing vocals
- Mark Isham – synthesizer, trumpet
- John Allair – organ
- David Hayes – bass
- Peter Van Hooke – drums
- Tom Donlinger – drums
- Chris Michie – guitar
- Katie Kissoon – backing vocals
- Bianca Thornton – backing vocals
- Carol Kenyon – backing vocals

== Charts ==
Chart (1984)	Position
Australia (Kent Music Report)	70
UK Albums Chart	47
