= It's All in the Game (song) =

Song

Song
- Written: 1911 (music); 1951 (lyrics)
- Published: 1912 by Gamble Hinged Music Co. (Melody); 1951 by Remick Music
- Composer: Charles G. Dawes
- Lyricist: Carl Sigman

"It's All in the Game" is a pop song whose most successful version was recorded by Tommy Edwards in 1958. Carl Sigman composed the lyrics in 1951 to a wordless 1911 composition titled "Melody in A Major", written by Charles G. Dawes, who was later Vice President of the United States under Calvin Coolidge. It is the only No. 1 single in the U.S. to have been co-written by a U.S. Vice President or a Nobel Peace Prize laureate (Dawes was both).

The song has become a pop standard, with cover versions by dozens of artists, including Cliff Richard whose version reached No. 2 in the U.K. in 1963.

Edwards' song ranked at No. 47 on Billboard's 2018 list of "The Hot 100's All-Time Top 600 Songs".

== "Melody in A Major" ==
Dawes, a Chicago bank president and amateur pianist and flautist, composed the tune for the flute in 1911 in a single sitting at his lakeshore home in Evanston. He played it for a friend, the violinist Francis MacMillen, who took Dawes's sheet music to a publisher. Dawes, then known for his federal appointments and as a banker, was surprised to find a portrait of himself in a State Street shop window with copies of the tune for sale. Dawes quipped, "I know that I will be the target of my punster friends. They will say that if all the notes in my bank are as bad as my musical ones, they are not worth the paper they were written on."

The tune, often dubbed "Dawes's Melody", followed him into politics, and he grew to detest hearing it wherever he appeared. It was a favorite of violinist Fritz Kreisler, who used it as his closing number, and in the 1940s it was picked up by musicians such as Tommy Dorsey.

== "It's All in the Game" ==
"It's All in the Game"

Single by Tommy Edwards
- B-side: "All Over Again" (original) "Please Love Me Forever"
- Released: August 1951 (original); July 1958 (new version)
- Genre: Rhythm and blues and pop
- Length: 3:02 (original); 2:25 (new version)
- Label: MGM
- Composer: Charles G. Dawes
- Lyricist: Carl Sigman

Tommy Edwards singles chronology
"It's All in the Game" (1951)	"Love Is All We Need" (1958)

In summer 1951, the songwriter Carl Sigman had an idea for a song, and Dawes's "Melody" struck him as suitable for his sentimental lyrics. Dawes had died in April of that year. The range of the classical melody would have made it "difficult to sing", so Sigman also rearranged the song.

The song was recorded that year by Dinah Shore, Sammy Kaye and Carmen Cavallaro, but the first release was by Tommy Edwards in August. Edwards's version reached No. 18 on the Billboard Records Most Played by Disk Jockeys survey dated September 15, 1951. A jazz arrangement was recorded by Louis Armstrong (vocals) and arranger Gordon Jenkins, with "some of Armstrong's most honey-tinged singing". In 1956, Jenkins would produce a version with Nat King Cole along the same lines.

=== 1958 re-recording ===
In 1958, Edwards had only one session left on his MGM contract. Stereophonic sound recording was becoming viable, and MGM executive Morty Craft asked Edwards to cut a stereo version of "It's All in the Game". Edwards updated the song with a rock and roll ballad arrangement.

The single was released in July and became a hit, reaching number one for six weeks beginning September 29, 1958, making Edwards the first African-American to chart at number one on the Billboard Hot 100. It would also be the last song to hit number one on the R&B Best Seller list. In November, the song also hit No. 1 on the UK Singles Chart.

The single sold over 3.5 million copies globally, earning Edwards a gold disc. The gold disc was presented in November 1958. It is one of few number one songs to reach the top 30 three times. The single helped Edwards revive his career for another two years, The success of the song also led other artists to re-record older songs in the newer styles.

=== All-time charts ===
Chart (1958–2018)	Position
US Billboard Hot 100	47

=== Weekly charts (1958) ===
Charts (1958)	Peak position
Italy (FIMI)	19
UK Singles (OCC)	1
US Billboard Hot 100	1

=== Monthly charts (1958) ===
Charts (1958)	Peak position
Belgium (Ultratop 50 Flanders)	11
Belgium (Ultratop 50 Wallonia)	29

== Cliff Richard version ==
"It's All in the Game"

Single by Cliff Richard
- B-side: "Your Eyes Tell on You"; "I'm Looking Out the Window" (US only)
- Released: 16 August 1963
- Recorded: 28 December 1962
- Studio: EMI Studios, London
- Genre: Pop
- Length: 3:12
- Label: Columbia; Epic (US); Capitol (Canada)
- Songwriters: Carl Sigman; Charles G. Dawes
- Producer: Norrie Paramor

Cliff Richard singles chronology
"Lucky Lips" (1963)	"It's All in the Game" (1963)	"Don't Talk to Him" (1963)

Cliff Richard had a number two hit in the United Kingdom in 1963 and a number 25 hit on the US Hot 100 in 1964. This was Richard's only top 40 hit in the United States in the 1960s (compared to his UK tally of 43) and his last until "Devil Woman" in 1976. In Canada, it reached number one on the CHUM Chart.

=== Charts ===
Chart (1963–64)	Peak position
Australia (AMR)	7
Canada (CHUM)	1
Belgium (Ultratop 50 Flanders)	6
Belgium (Ultratop 50 Wallonia)	32
Israel (Kel Israel Broadcasting)	1
Netherlands (Single Top 100)	4
New Zealand (Lever Hit Parades)	3
Norway (VG-lista)	2
UK Singles (OCC)	2
US Billboard Hot 100	25
US Adult Contemporary (Billboard)	10
US Cash Box	24

== Four Tops version ==
"It's All in the Game"

Single by Four Tops

from the album Still Waters Run Deep
- B-side: "Love (Is the Answer)"
- Released: March 21, 1970
- Recorded: 1970
- Studio: Motown
- Genre: Pop
- Length: 2:49
- Label: Motown
- Composer: Charles G. Dawes
- Lyricist: Carl Sigman

Four Tops singles chronology
"I Can't Help Myself (Sugar Pie Honey Bunch)" (1970)	"It's All in the Game" (1970)	"Still Water (Love)" (1970)

In 1970, the Four Tops had a number five hit in the United Kingdom. Their version peaked at number six on the soul charts and number 24 on the Billboard Hot 100.

=== Charts ===
Chart (1970)	Peak position
Australia (AMR)	21
Belgium (Ultratop 50 Flanders)	26
UK Singles (OCC)	5
US Billboard Hot 100	24
US Hot R&B/Hip-Hop Songs (Billboard)	6

== Other recordings ==
- Van Morrison included his version in a medley with "You Know What They're Writing About" on his 1979 album Into the Music; he also used the song as the B-side of his 1982 single "Cleaning Windows". His cover of the song was listed number 813 on Dave Marsh's list of the "1001 Greatest Singles Ever Made". Morrison also released it on the live albums Live at the Grand Opera House Belfast (1984), A Night in San Francisco (1994) and Live at Austin City Limits Festival (2006).
- Merle Haggard backed by the Strangers recorded a version for his 1984 album It's All in the Game. His version peaked at number 54 on the Billboard Hot Country Singles chart.

== See also ==
- List of number-one singles in Australia during the 1950s
- List of number-one singles from the 1950s (UK)
- List of Hot 100 number-one singles of 1958 (U.S.)
- List of number-one R&B singles of 1958 (U.S.)
