= Enlightenment (Van Morrison album) =

Studio album by Van Morrison
- Released: October 1990
- Recorded: February 1990
- Studio: The Wool Hall (Beckington, UK); Real World (Box, UK); Box Studio (London, UK); Pavilion Studios (London, UK); The Kirk (Somerset, UK)
- Genre: Celtic, folk rock
- Length: 50:30
- Label: Polydor
- Producer: Van Morrison

Van Morrison chronology
The Best of Van Morrison (1990)	Enlightenment (1990)	Hymns to the Silence (1991)

Singles from Enlightenment
- 1. "Real Real Gone" Released: September 1990; 2. "In the Days Before Rock 'N' Roll" Released: November 1990; 3. "Enlightenment" Released: January 1991

Professional ratings
Review scores
Source	Rating
AllMusic	3/5 stars
Robert Christgau	B+
Entertainment Weekly	A
MusicHound	3.5/5
Rolling Stone	4/5 stars
Select	4/5 medals

Enlightenment is the twentieth studio album by Northern Irish singer-songwriter Van Morrison. It was released in 1990 and reached No. 5 in the UK charts and "Real Real Gone" charted at No. 18 in Mainstream Rock Tracks.

The June 2008 re-issued and re-mastered version of the album contains alternate takes of "Enlightenment" and "So Quiet in Here". "Start All Over Again" from this album was listed as one of the standout tracks from the six album reissue.

== Recording ==
The album was recorded in London, England, and Real World in Box. The arrangements were by Fiachra Trench and Micheal O'Suilleabhain played piano with a brass section made up of British jazz musicians from the late sixties: Frank Ricotti, Henry Lowther and Malcolm Griffiths. One of the songs "So Quiet in Here" was recorded at the Kirk, Rode, Somerset, a setting which served as both church or studio.

== Composition ==
The song "Enlightenment" contains the words: "I'm in the here and now and I'm meditating/ And still I'm suffering but that's my problem/ Enlightenment, don't know what it is". "So Quiet in Here" is a continuation of the song "Into the Mystic" from the Moondance album. The single released from the album, "Real Real Gone", was originally written and meant for the 1980 album Common One. The song "In the Days Before Rock 'N' Roll" was a collaboration between Morrison and the Irish poet Paul Durcan.

== Track listing ==
All songs by Morrison unless noted otherwise.

1. "Real Real Gone" – 3:43
2. "Enlightenment" – 4:04
3. "So Quiet in Here" – 6:09
4. "Avalon of the Heart" – 4:45
5. "See Me Through" – 6:13
6. "Youth of 1,000 Summers" – 3:45
7. "In the Days Before Rock 'N' Roll" (Durcan, Morrison) – 8:13
8. "Start All Over Again" – 4:10
9. "She's My Baby" – 5:14
10. "Memories" – 4:14

=== Bonus tracks (2008 CD reissue) ===
1. "Enlightenment" – 3:29 (alternate take)
2. "So Quiet in Here" – 4:03 (alternate take)

== Personnel ==
=== Musicians ===
- Van Morrison – vocals, guitar, harmonica
- The Ambrosian Singers – choir, with John McCarthy as choirmaster (on 4)
- Dave Bishop – soprano and baritone saxophones
- Paul Durcan – spoken word (on 7)
- Dave Early – drums (except on 4, 10)
- Georgie Fame – electric piano, hammond organ, backing vocals
- Alex Gifford – synthesizers, piano
- Steve Gregory – tenor saxophone, flute
- Malcolm Griffiths – trombone
- Bernie Holland – lead guitar (on 2, 6, 9)
- Henry Lowther – trumpet (on 6, 8, 9)
- Brian Odgers – bass guitar (on 2, 9)
- Mícheál Ó Súilleabháin – piano (on 3)
- Steve Pearce – bass guitar (except on 2, 9)
- Frank Ricotti – vibraphone (on 8)
- Steve Sanger – drums (on 4, 10)
- Steve Waterman – flugelhorn (on 6, 8, 9)

=== Production ===
Recorded mainly at Wool Hall Studios, Beckington
Townhouse, London, Real World, Box and Pavilion Studios, London.
("So Quiet in Here" recorded at The Kirk, Rode, Somerset)

- Producer: Van Morrison
- Engineers: Mick Glossop, Steve Williams
- Additional engineering: Alastair McMillan
- Mixing: Mick Glossop, Steve Williams
- String, Brass and Choir arrangements: Fiachra Trench
- String section leader: Gavin Wright
- Keyboard and Synth arrangements: Neil Drinkwater

== Charts ==
=== Album ===
UK Album Chart

Year	Chart	Position
1990	UK Album Chart	5

Billboard (North America)

Year	Chart	Position
1990	The Billboard 200	62

=== Singles ===
Billboard

Year	Single	Chart	Position
1990	"Real Real Gone"	Mainstream Rock Tracks	18
