= Hymns to the Silence =

Studio album by Van Morrison
- Released: September 1991
- Recorded: 1990
- Studio: The Wool Hall, Beckington; Townhouse and Westside, London
- Genre: Rhythm and blues, folk, pop, Celtic, rock, gospel
- Length: 94:53
- Label: Polydor
- Producer: Van Morrison

Van Morrison chronology
Enlightenment (1990)	Hymns to the Silence (1991)	The Best of Van Morrison Volume Two (1993)

Singles from Hymns to the Silence
- 1. "I Can't Stop Loving You" b/w "All Saints Day" Released: May 1991; 2. "Why Must I Always Explain?" b/w "So Complicated" Released: September 1991

Hymns to the Silence is the twenty-first studio album by Northern Irish singer-songwriter Van Morrison. It was his first studio double album. Morrison recorded the album in 1990 in Beckington at The Wool Hall Studios and in London at Townhouse and Westside Studios.

When Hymns to the Silence was released in 1991, it reached number five on the UK Albums Chart and received positive reviews from critics. Morrison's use of various musical styles was well received, as were the more worldly-themed songs on an otherwise spiritual album.

== Recording and composition ==
The album of songs was recorded during sessions at Wool Hall Studios in Beckington, Townhouse, London and Westside Studios, London with Mick Glossop as engineer, except for the song "Take Me Back". It was recorded in 1990 at Pavilion Studios in London with Martin Hayles and Mick Glossop as engineers.

"Why Must I Always Explain?" was set to the same melody as 1970s "Tupelo Honey". There were two hymns. "Be Thou My Vision" and "Just a Closer Walk With Thee". The song, "Carrying a Torch" was also included on Tom Jones's album by the same name, along with three other Morrison compositions from "Hymns to the Silence".

== Critical reception ==
Professional ratings
Review scores
Source	Rating
AllMusic	3.5/5 stars
Chicago Tribune	3/4 stars
Encyclopedia of Popular Music	3/5 stars
Entertainment Weekly	A
Q	3/5 stars
Rolling Stone	4/5 stars
The Rolling Stone Album Guide	3/5 stars
The Village Voice	B+

In a review for Time, Jay Cocks said "Hymns focuses and redefines Morrison's themes over his long career, rather like a museum retrospective already in progress. It dips deep into autobiography, spiritual speculation and blues mythology for its themes." Rolling Stone magazine's Elysa Gardner said despite overblown hymns such as "Take Me Back" and "Pagan Streams", Morrison appropriates a variety of musical styles into both joyful and poignant songs on an album that "brims with the consistent passion that continues to make Morrison fascinating". Alec Foege from Spin argued that its music is more eclectic than the entirety of Morrison's 1980s albums, while the lyrics prove he can reconcile his Christian faith with more worldly themes, allowing for "a refreshingly individualistic soul-searching". In The Village Voice, Robert Christgau lamented the amount of filler throughout the two discs in the form of several hymns and love songs, but complimented the secular songs about true love, ordinary life, and "the days before rock and roll", finding the album "more affecting than you'd figure" overall. It was voted the 21st best album of 1991 in The Village Voice's annual Pazz & Jop critics poll.

In a retrospective review, AllMusic's Michael Gallucci felt Hymns to the Silence was Morrison's best album during the 1990s, although he also found it too long and essentially a "spirited rewrite" of his previous record Enlightenment. Rob Sheffield was more critical in The Rolling Stone Album Guide (2004), deeming it a "complex and self-involved" imitation of Avalon Sunset with a few exceptional songs.

== Track listing ==
All songs written by Van Morrison unless noted.

=== Disc one ===
1. "Professional Jealousy" – 3:42
2. "I'm Not Feeling It Anymore" – 6:34
3. "Ordinary Life" – 3:29
4. "Some Peace of Mind" – 6:24
5. "So Complicated" – 3:18
6. "I Can't Stop Loving You" – (Gibson) – 3:54 (With The Chieftains)
7. "Why Must I Always Explain?" – 3:50
8. "Village Idiot" – 3:13
9. "See Me Through, Pt. 2 (Just a Closer Walk with Thee)" – (Traditional) – 3:10
10. "Take Me Back" – 9:11

=== Disc two ===
1. "By His Grace" – 2:34
2. "All Saints Day" – 2:28
3. "Hymns to the Silence" – 9:42
4. "On Hyndford Street" – 5:17
5. "Be Thou My Vision" – (Traditional) – 3:49 (With The Chieftains)
6. "Carrying a Torch" – 4:26
7. "Green Mansions" – 3:38
8. "Pagan Streams" – 3:38
9. "Quality Street" – (Morrison, Rebennack) – 3:57
10. "It Must Be You" – 4:08
11. "I Need Your Kind of Loving" – 4:31

== Personnel ==
- Van Morrison - vocal, guitar, harmonica, alto saxophone
- Haji Ahkba - flugelhorn
- Derek Bell - synthesizer
- The Chieftains - instrumentation
- Terry Disley - piano
- Neil Drinkwater - accordion, piano, synthesizer
- Candy Dulfer - alto saxophone
- Dave Early - drums, percussion
- Georgie Fame - piano, Hammond organ, backing vocals
- Eddie Friel - piano, Hammond organ, synthesizer
- Steve Gregory - flute, baritone saxophone
- Carol Kenyon - backing vocals
- Katie Kissoon - backing vocals
- Steve Pearce - bass
- Paul Robinson - drums
- Nicky Scott - bass
- Kate St John - cor anglais

== Charts ==
Album - Billboard (North America)

Year	Chart	Position
1991	The Billboard 200	99

Album - UK Album Chart

Year	Chart	Position
1991	UK Album Chart	5
