= Chris Michie =

American guitarist and composer

- Born: January 12, 1948; Ithaca, New York, United States
- Origin: Madison, Wisconsin, United States
- Died: March 27, 2003 (aged 55) Fairfax, California, United States
- Genres: Rock, pop rock
- Occupation: Musician
- Instrument: guitar
- Years active: 1967–2003
- Formerly of: Van Morrison

Chris Michie (January 12, 1948 – March 27, 2003) was an American guitarist and composer, best known for his work with Van Morrison.

Chris Michie was born in Ithaca, New York, in 1948 and moved to Madison, Wisconsin, when he was a teenager. He attended the University of Wisconsin. Michie played in a band named The Grapes of Wrath, while still a teenager. In 1969, he moved to California as a member of the Madison band, The Mendelbaum Blues Band. Keith Knudsen, a future Doobie Brothers drummer was also a member of the band. Michie quit the band in 1971 and joined the rock band, Lamb. David Rubinson, the band's producer, picked Michie to be guitarist with the Pointer Sisters.

In 1981, Michie played on Van Morrison's album Beautiful Vision after picking up a message from engineer Jim Stern. Chris and his family had just arrived in Hawaii for a vacation. Jim asked if he could get to the studio the next day. Chris turned around and flew home to do the session, then returned to Hawaii. When recording the album, Morrison had a certain guitar tone in mind that neither Herbie Armstrong nor Mark Knopfler had been able to produce. After Beautiful Vision, Michie then played guitar and toured with Van Morrison as a band member until 1986, playing on the albums Inarticulate Speech of the Heart (1983), Live at the Grand Opera House Belfast (1984), A Sense of Wonder (1985) and No Guru, No Method, No Teacher (1986). Other band members of Van Morrison's band were David Hayes and Mark Springer. Michie would also play lead guitar on the album Sneaker Waves with them and play in a band with them called The Adapters.

Michie worked as a freelance guitarist in the San Francisco Bay Area. He worked with Boz Scaggs, Maria Muldaur, Jerry Garcia and Link Wray. Michie composed soundtracks for the TV show Starsky and Hutch. He also served as musical director for David Soul. His final project was to compose the soundtrack for The Wild Parrots of Telegraph Hill. The movie was released posthumously, and was dedicated to him.

Michie was married to Deborah Brown Michie for thirty five years and had a daughter, Claire, with her. He died at his home in Fairfax, California, in 2003 from melanoma after having the disease for six years.

== Discography ==
- Bridge (1981)
- Guitars and Oranges (1993)
- The Night Flight (1994)
- Following Old Joe Clark (1995)
- Seven Rivers (1997)
- Tough Love (1998)
- The Goyer Golf Suite (2001)
- The Wild Parrots of Telegraph Hill (2005)
