= Babatunde Lea =

American percussionist (born 1948)

- Born: Michael Wayne Lea; February 18, 1948; Danville, Virginia
- Origin: San Francisco, California
- Genres: Jazz, Afrobeat, world music
- Occupation: Musician
- Instrument: Percussion
- Years active: 1968–present
- Label: Motéma
- Website: babatundelea.com

Babatunde Lea (born Michael Wayne Lea; February 18, 1948) is an American percussionist who plays Afro-Cuban jazz and worldbeat. He took his name from Nigerian drummer Babatunde Olatunji.

== Biography ==
Michael Lea was raised in Englewood, New Jersey, while regularly commuting to 116th and Amsterdam in New York, where the rest of his family lived after moving from his birthplace, Danville, Virginia. His aunt was one of the first women to play in a marching band. He began drumming at the age of 11, when he, without drumming experience helped a drumline get a rhythm right. That same year, his cousin took him to see Babatunde Olatunji and his "Drums of Passion", and Olatunji's influence was so great that Michael took on his first name. At 16, he first participated in a professional recording session with Ed Townsend. In 1968, he moved to San Francisco, where he joined Bata Koto, led by Bill Summers. He joined a band called Juju, which relocated to Richmond, Virginia in the early 1970s.

In 1977, he moved back to the San Francisco Bay Area. Among the artists with whom he played were Stan Getz, Joe Henderson, McCoy Tyner, Randy Weston, Van Morrison, Oscar Brown, Jr. and Mark Murphy. In 1993, Virginia and Babatunde Lea founded the Educultural Foundation, a California 501(c)(3) educational non-profit organization based in Vallejo, California.

Returning east, he met up with Leon Thomas (who used to sing at the church Lea attended as a youngster, the First Baptist Church of Englewood) and became drummer in his band. This led to working with Pharoah Sanders. Lea would ultimately pay tribute to Thomas on his 2009 album, Umbo Weti, which appeared on the Motéma Music label that he founded with Jana Herzen in 2003. His first album as leader, Levels of Consciousness was released in 1979. He recorded with a band called Phenomena, which grew out of the Loft Jazz Association. He did not release another, Level of Intent, until 1996, putting it on his own label, Diaspora Records. He mortgaged his home to get the album released, but it was not widely distributed until Motéma reissued it in 2003.

In 2010, Babatunde and Virginia moved to Pennsylvania to teach at Gettysburg College.

Says Lea of his work, "I strive to make my compositions functional, which is an African take on the arts. The purpose I try to imbue my music with is that our growth as human beings should strive toward an anti-racist, anti-sexist, anti-homophobic, egalitarian, democratic universal society and I don't care how many lifetimes it takes to get there! I consider myself an activist as well as a musician and consider myself an 'agent of change.'"

His work has been noted for its mixture of styles and influences.

== Discography ==
=== Albums ===
Album	Year	Label
Levels Of Consciousness	1979	Theresa
Level Of Intent	1995	Diaspora
March Of The Jazz Guerillas	2000	Ubiquity
Soul Pools	2002	Motéma
Suite Unseen: Summoner Of The Ghost	2005	Motéma
Umbo Weti: A Tribute To Leon Thomas	2009	Motéma

=== Credits ===
Elaine Lucia Album	Year	Label
Sings Jazz and Other Things	2001	Raw
David Leshare Watson Album	Year	Label
Live at Lo Spuntino	2002	Music in the Lines
Loves Swinging Soft & Ballads	2003	Music in the Lines
DJ Jackie Christie Album	Year	Label
Made 4 U	2004	Motéma
Valerie Joi Album	Year	Label
Rise Above	2004	TruJoi Music
Singing the Sacred Yes	2006	Gemini Sun
Bujo Kevin Jones Album	Year	Label
Tenth World	2005	Motéma
Wayne Wallace Album	Year	Label
Dedication	2006	Patois Records
Idris Ackamoor Album	Year	Label
Music of Idris Ackamoor 1971–2004	2005—2000	EM Records
Eric Swinderman Album	Year	Label
In Pursuit of the Sound	2006	Self-released
Panos Kappos Album	Year	Label
Harmony	2007	Voyager Records
Mark Murphy Album	Year	Label
Wild and Free	2017	Highnote
