= David Hayes (musician) =

American musician

David Hayes is an American bassist, guitarist, producer, singer and songwriter.

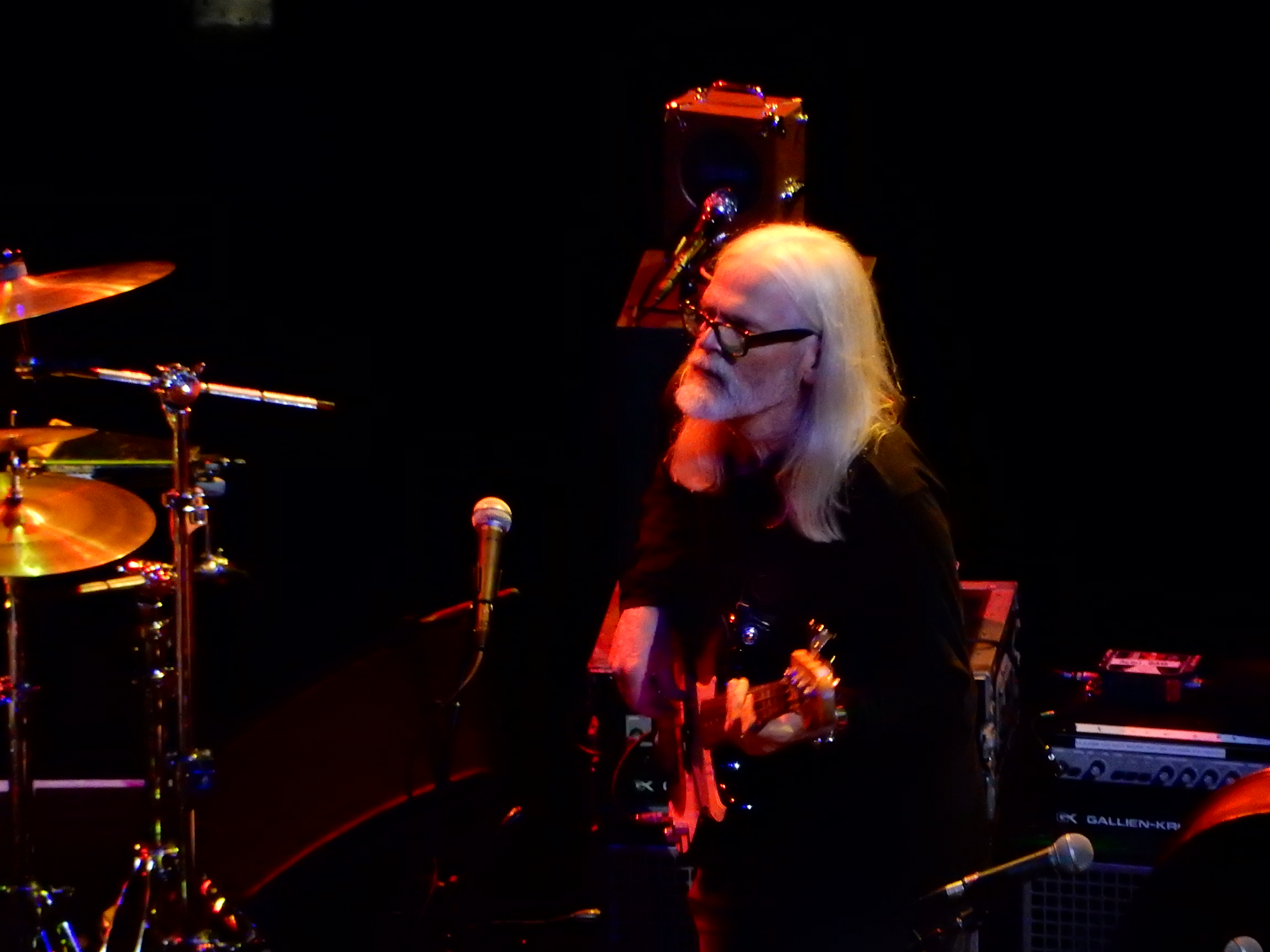
David Hayes on Bass

== Biography ==
Hayes has worked with Van Morrison, Jesse Colin Young, The Rowans, Terry & The Pirates, Southside Johnny and the Asbury Jukes, Country Joe McDonald and others.

Hayes first played on a Van Morrison album in 1973 with the release of Hard Nose the Highway and was a member of Morrison's acclaimed band, The Caledonia Soul Orchestra playing on the live album, It's Too Late to Stop Now. This album has often been regarded as one of the top live albums of all time. Hayes is a featured member of the band on Van Morrison's first ever DVD, Live at Montreux 1980/1974 released in 2006. He also appeared with Morrison's band on his Pay the Devil tour, performing with him at the Austin City Limits Festival in September, 2006, which was released on the limited edition album Live at Austin City Limits Festival and performs at stateside residencies, such as Caesars Palace, Las Vegas as part of Van's current North American touring band. The other Morrison albums Hayes has contributed to are Veedon Fleece (1974), Into the Music (1979), Common One (1980), Beautiful Vision (1982), Inarticulate Speech of the Heart (1983), Live at the Grand Opera House Belfast (1984), A Sense of Wonder (1985), No Guru, No Method, No Teacher (1986), Down the Road (2002), What's Wrong with This Picture? (2003), Magic Time (2005), Keep It Simple (2008), Astral Weeks Live at the Hollywood Bowl (2009) and Three Chords & the Truth (2019). Hayes has also accompanied Morrison in concert more times than any other musician.

Hayes also has released six solo albums starting in 1988 with Sunbathing In Leningrad, followed by Logos Through A Sideman in 1989, Born Heroes in 1993, "Soul Diver" in 2007, "In Stereo" in 2011, and "FolkJazz" in 2013; the last three have all been released since moving with his family to the rural Northern California coast. David has also pursued visual arts along with his musical career and has painted or sketched all the covers for his albums.

On December 10, 2016 Hayes and duo partner Gene Parsons released their first album as a duo, Gene Parsons & David Hayes. Hayes and Parsons (formerly of The Byrds, Flying Burrito Brothers) met in sessions on the Mendocino Coast, where both live. Their work as a musical duo began in earnest in the mid-00's. In 2013, the duo of Parsons and Hayes invited singer-songwriters Gwyneth Moreland, for whom Hayes had produced the album "Ceilings Floors and Open Doors" (2014), and Steven Bates, a long time California club headliner, to join them in four-part harmony vocals and a showcase for each member's songwriting. The Mendocino Quartet was born and in 2017 released their first CD together "Way Out There."

Hayes produced a 2015 EP of live performances for Moreland called "Stages" that featured concert recordings with all members of The Quartet and, in 2017, he produced Gwyneth Moreland's "Cider." Both Ceilings Floors and Open Doors and Cider won the two of them accolades including topping Folk singles and album Charts.
