= Ladytron discography =

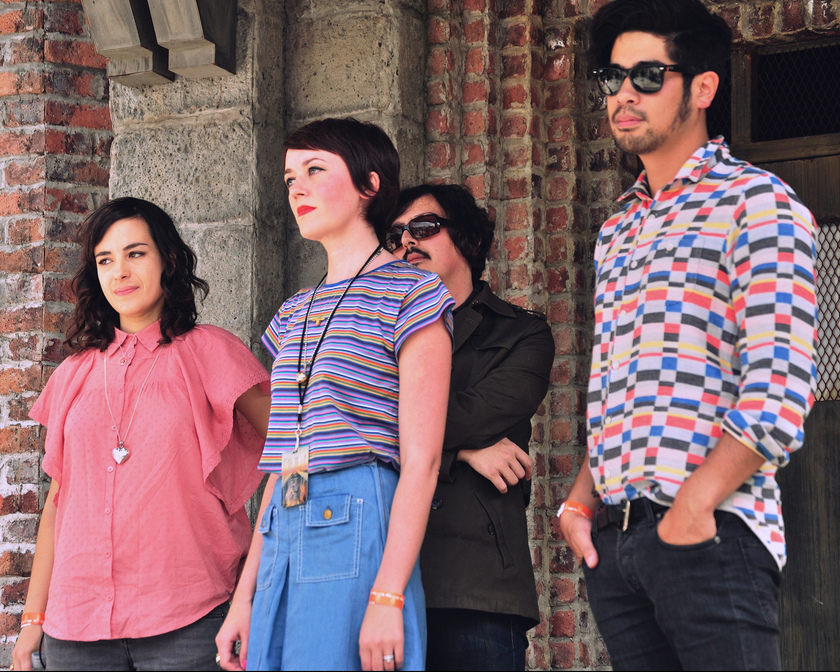
- Ladytron in Mexico (2011)
- Studio albums: 8
- Extended plays: 6
- Live albums: 1
- Compilation albums: 8
- Singles: 20
- Video albums: 1
- Music videos: 17
- Promotional singles: 1

English electronic music band Ladytron have released eight studio albums, one live album, eight compilation albums, six extended plays, 20 singles, one promotional single, one video album and 19 music videos. Formed in 1999 in Liverpool, Merseyside, the band consists of Helen Marnie (lead vocals, synthesisers), Mira Aroyo (vocals, synthesisers), Daniel Hunt (synthesisers, electric guitar, vocals) and Reuben Wu (synthesisers).

The band's sound blends electropop with new wave and shoegazing elements. Ladytron have described their sound as "electronic pop". They focused on a balance between pop structures and experimental sounds. Some of the group's songs performed by Aroyo contain lyrics written in her native Bulgarian.

Ladytron took their name from the 1972 song of the same name by Roxy Music. Former Roxy Music member Brian Eno has described Ladytron as "the best of English pop music".

== Albums ==
=== Studio albums ===
List of studio albums, with selected chart positions
Title	Details	Peak chart positions					
Title	Details	UK	FIN	US	US Dance	US Heat.	US Indie
604	Released: 6 February 2001; Label: Invicta Hi-Fi; Formats: CD, LP, download	—	—	—	—	—	—
Light & Magic	Released: 17 September 2002; Label: Telstar; Formats: CD, LP, download	—	—	—	7	—	24
Witching Hour	Released: 4 October 2005; Label: Island; Formats: CD, LP, download	81	—	—	7	32	40
Velocifero	Released: 19 May 2008; Label: Nettwerk; Formats: CD, LP, download	75	—	131	3	3	—
Gravity the Seducer	Released: 13 September 2011; Label: Nettwerk; Formats: CD, LP, download	72	50	112	6	2	27
Ladytron	Released: 15 February 2019; Label: Ladytron Music; Formats: CD, LP, download	—	—	—	13	3	10
Time's Arrow	Released: 20 January 2023; Label: Cooking Vinyl; Formats: CD, LP, cassette, download	67	—	—	—	—	—
Paradises	Released: 20 March 2026; Label: Nettwerk; Formats: CD, LP, download	—	—	—	—	—	—
"—" denotes a recording that did not chart or was not released in that territory.

=== Live albums ===
Title	Details
Live at London Astoria 16.07.08	Released: 2009; Label: Self-released; Formats: CD, LP, download

=== Compilation albums ===
List of compilation albums, with selected chart positions
Title	Details	Peak chart positions
Title	Details	US Dance
Softcore Jukebox	Released: 7 October 2003; Label: Emperor Norton; Format: CD	24
604 (Remixed & Rare)	Released: 1 September 2009; Label: Redbird, Cobraside; Formats: CD, download	—
Light & Magic (Remixed & Rare)	Released: 1 September 2009; Label: Redbird, Cobraside; Formats: CD, download	—
Witching Hour (Remixed & Rare)	Released: 1 September 2009; Label: Redbird, Cobraside; Formats: CD, download	—
Velocifero (Remixed & Rare)	Released: 6 April 2010; Label: Nettwerk; Formats: CD, download	—
Best of Remixes	Released: 8 March 2011; Label: Nettwerk; Format: Download	—
Best of 00–10	Released: 28 March 2011; Label: Nettwerk; Formats: CD, download	20
Gravity the Seducer Remixed	Released: 29 November 2013; Label: Nettwerk; Formats: CD, LP, download	—
"—" denotes a recording that did not chart or was not released in that territory.

== Extended plays ==
List of extended plays, with selected chart positions
Title	Details	Peak chart positions
Title	Details	US Dance
Miss Black and Her Friends	Released: December 1999; Label: Bambini; Format: CD	—
Commodore Rock	Released: June 2000; Label: Emperor Norton; Formats: CD, 10", 12"	—
Mu-Tron EP	Released: October 2000; Label: Invicta Hi-Fi; Formats: CD, 12"	—
Extended Play	Released: 11 April 2006; Label: Rykodisc; Format: CD + DVD	19
The Harmonium Sessions	Released: 2006; Label: Self-released; Formats: CD, download	—
Ace of Hz EP	Released: 11 January 2011; Label: Nettwerk; Format: Download	—
"—" denotes a recording that did not chart or was not released in that territory.

== Singles ==
List of singles, with selected chart positions, showing year released and album name
Title	Year	Peak chart positions				Album
Title	Year	UK	AUS	US Sales	US Dance	Album
"He Took Her to a Movie"	1999	—	—	—	—	604
"The Way That I Found You"	2001	88	—	—	—	604
"Playgirl"	2001	89	—	—	—	604
"Seventeen"	2002	68	45	—	—	Light & Magic
"Blue Jeans"	2003	43	—	—	—	Light & Magic
"Evil"	2003	44	—	—	—	Light & Magic
"Cracked LCD"/"USA vs White Noise"	2003	—	—	—	—	Light & Magic
"Sugar"	2005	45	—	—	—	Witching Hour
"Destroy Everything You Touch"	2005	42	—	—	—	Witching Hour
"Weekend"	2007	—	—	—	—	Witching Hour
"Soft Power"	2007	—	—	—	—	Witching Hour
"Ghosts"	2008	109	—	43	—	Velocifero
"Runaway"	2008	—	—	—	30	Velocifero
"Tomorrow"	2009	—	—	—	—	Velocifero
"Ace of Hz"	2011	—	—	9	—	Best of 00–10
"White Elephant"	2011	—	—	—	—	Gravity the Seducer
"Ambulances"	2011	—	—	—	—	Gravity the Seducer
"Mirage"	2011	—	—	—	—	Gravity the Seducer
"The Animals"	2018	—	—	—	—	Ladytron
"The Island"	2018	—	—	—	—	Ladytron
"Far from Home"	2018	—	—	—	—	Ladytron
"Deadzone"	2019	—	—	—	—	Ladytron
"Tower of Glass"	2020	—	—	—	—	Ladytron
"City of Angels"	2022	—	—	—	—	Time's Arrow
"Misery Remember Me"	2022	—	—	—	—	Time's Arrow
"Faces"	2022	—	—	—	—	Time's Arrow
"—" denotes a recording that did not chart or was not released in that territory.

=== Promotional singles ===
Title	Year	Album
"International Dateline"	2005	Witching Hour

== Other appearances ==
Title	Year	Notes
"Open Your Heart"	2001	Cover version of The Human League's song from the compilation album Reproductions: Songs of The Human League.
"Rockfalls & Estuaries"	2009	Included on the soundtrack of the video game The Sims 3.
"She Stepped Out of the Car"	2009	Included on the soundtrack of the video game The Sims 3.
"Young Etruscians"	2009	Included on the soundtrack of the video game The Sims 3.
"Use Your Mind"	2009	Performed on the children's television series Yo Gabba Gabba!.
"Tesla"	2012	Included on the soundtrack of the video game The Sims 3: Supernatural.

== Videography ==
=== Video albums ===
Title	Details
Best of 00–10 Videos	Released: 10 May 2011; Label: Nettwerk; Format: iTunes video

=== Music videos ===
List of music videos, showing year released and directors
Title	Year	Director(s)
"Playgirl" (version 1)	2000	James Slater and Neil McLean
"Playgirl" (version 2)	2001	James Slater and Neil McLean
"Seventeen"	2003	David Chaudoir
"Evil" (UK version)	2003	Scott Lyon
"Evil" (US version)	2003	James Slater and Neil McLean
"Blue Jeans"	2003	James Slater and Neil McLean
"Sugar"	2005	Andy Roberts
"Destroy Everything You Touch"	2005	Adam Bartley
"Ghosts"	2008	Joseph Kahn
"Runaway"	2008	Mike Sharpe and Barney Steele
"Tomorrow"	2009	Neil Krug
"Ace of Hz"	2011	Chino Moya
"White Elephant"	2011	Michele Civetta
"Mirage"	2011	Michael Sherrington
"International Dateline"	2013	Unknown
"The Animals"	2018	Fernando Nogari
"The Island"	2018	Bryan M. Ferguson
"Tower of Glass"	2020	Manuel Nogueira
"Light & Magic"	2022	Unknown
"Faces"	2023	Daniel Hunt
