= Alphabet block =

Alphabet block may refer to:

- Alphabet Block, a song on Strange Words and Weird Wars, the second studio album by Scottish musician Marnie
- Toy block
