= Bryan M. Ferguson =

Scottish filmmaker and music video director

- Born: 25 February 1987 (age 39); Glasgow, Scotland
- Occupations: Filmmaker, music video director
- Years active: 2010–present
- Website: bryanmferguson.co.uk

Bryan M. Ferguson (born 25 February 1987) is a Scottish filmmaker and music video director, best known for his wraparound segment in Shudder's V/H/S/Halloween and his music videos for artists such as Garbage, Alice Glass, Ladytron, Arab Strap and Boy Harsher.

== Music videos ==
After being recommended Ferguson's early short films, Helen Marnie of Ladytron head-hunted Ferguson to write and direct a short film to accompany the band's single "The Island". The short film was controversial for fans for its disturbing ending but supported by the band for its social commentary on humanity. The film would later be invited to screen at the Raindance Film Festival and Leeds International Film Festival in 2019. Ferguson would subsequently work with the band again for their song, "Deadzone". The video is notable for being inspired by J.G. Ballard's "Crash".

Following the release of Ladytron's "The Island", Ferguson would work with frequent collaborator Sega Bodega for the first time on his multidisciplinary EP project titled "self*care". Ferguson was one of the six filmmakers invited to create their own interpretations of 'self care' for the track "Hopeless!!!". Other notable artists invited to create films for the project were Brooke Candy and BEA1991. Ferguson would later direct music videos for Sega Bodega's singles, "U Suck" and "Make U Stay" featuring Låpsley.

On 11 December 2018 Ferguson's vampiric music video for Boy Harsher's "Fate" was released and was named one of The 20 best videos of 2018 by Filter Magazine.

After seeing his video for Boy Harsher, Lil Peep's producer, Fish Narc approached Ferguson in 2020 to direct the videos for both his singles, "So Long!", featuring Cold Hart and "New Medication" from the GothBoiClique released album, "Wildfire".

On 17 February 2021 Ferguson's controversial video for Arab Strap's single "Here Comes Comus!" was released. The video was deemed too explicit for YouTube by the band's label, Rock Action. The band's frontman, Aidan Moffat, revealed scenes of full frontal male nudity and excessive drug taking were omitted during an interview on Reddit.

On 2 December 2021 a video directed by Ferguson was released for Ross from Friends' single "Love Divide". The music video was released by Flying Lotus' label Brainfeeder and depicts a business man looking for his face inside an office building where everyone's head is on backward.

On 8 December 2021 Ferguson's dramatic video for Alice Glass' "Fair Game" was premiered via Rolling Stone. The video depicts a young woman in a leather straitjacket breaking free of chains while being tormented by a ghostly Alice Glass. The track is written from the perspective of Glass' abuser based on her experiences while in the band Crystal Castles. He would collaborate again with Alice Glass on the gory music video for "Love Is Violence". The early 2000's inspired video depicts two teenagers who sensually pull out each other's entrails.

On 1 September 2022 The Soft Moon released the single "Monster" accompanied with a provocative music video directed by Ferguson. The body-horror infused video depicts a man slowly transforming into a monstrous form.

On 21 October 2022, a "vampiric" music video for Garbage single, "Witness to Your Love" directed by Ferguson was teased. The video premiered on 28 October, the day of Anthology release.

On 10 November 2022, Låpsley released her single "Hotel Corridors" with a video directed by Ferguson. The video was shot in the Grand Central Hotel in Glasgow while it was vacant during the COVID-19 lockdowns.

On 11 June 2024, Ferguson's monochromatic music video for Molchat Doma's single "Son" was premiered by Sacred Bones Records.

On 27 August 2024, Ferguson's glitch music video for Machine Girl's single "Until I Die" premiered.

On 10 September 2024, Ferguson's music video for TR/ST's single "Performance" premiered by Dais Records.

== Short films ==
In 2015 Ferguson won The Skinny Short Film Award for his no-budget Florida set film "Caustic Gulp". He would gain notoriety within the Scottish short film circuit in 2016 with his follow up film, "Flamingo". The mid-length film depicts two strangers and their fetish for self-amputation. The film caused multiple viewers to faint at the Centre for Contemporary Arts in Glasgow during its premiere at the Glasgow Short Film Festival.

In 2019, Ferguson released the short film, Satanic Panic '87. An 1980s set horror-comedy infusing death metal with a satanic aerobics tape. The film was made as part of Channel 4's Random Acts and subsequently broadcast during Halloween on Film4 as part of their FilmFear season. The Skinny called it "the kind of imaginative, outsider art that Channel 4 has been championing since its inception." Dazed called it "absolute carnage". In 2020 the film became one of four films invited to represent Scottish short film for Short Circuit's Screening in Scotland Film Tour. The film screened at notable festivals such as Show Me Shorts, Cork International Film Festival and Galway Film Fleadh. The film can be streamed on Gunpowder and Sky's horror channel Alter and Arrow Film's streaming platform, Arrow Player.

Ferguson released the short film, "Insecticide", made during the COVID-19 lockdowns. Ferguson made the film entirely within 72 hours with his wife, using only what they had in their apartment then soundtracked by Alex Mackay of Mogwai. The film would later be available on Arrow Films's streaming platform, Arrow Player.

On 6 July 2021 it was announced Ferguson had made a short film entitled "Red Room" based upon Helen McClory's Gothic Novel "Bitterhall". The film was commissioned by the Edinburgh International Book Festival and premiered in The New York Times Theatre at Edinburgh College of Art.

On 6 December 2021 the London Short Film Festival announced a retrospective of Ferguson's short film and music video work, entitled "Irregular Atrocities – The Films of Bryan M. Ferguson", as part of their 2022 festival programme.

Adult Swim commissioned Ferguson's short film, "Earworm", which was featured in the episode "BUGS" on the channel's long running show, "Off The Air" in September 2022. The film was subsequently selected as Vimeo Staff Pick by the curation team.

On 19 October 2022 it was announced that Ferguson's film "Red Room" would be released theatrically across cinemas nationwide in United Kingdom via the British Film Institute as part of their In Dreams Are Monsters season. The film was classified "15" for strong threat and language by the British Board of Film Classification.

On 17 October 2023, Ferguson released a Halloween themed trailer for his forthcoming short film, "Pumpkin Guts", the film was scored by Ferguson's friend and collaborator, Luis Vasquez, known professionally as The Soft Moon. Vasquez died on 18 January 2024 while the film was in post-production. The film is currently on hiatus. Ferguson mentioned in an interview with The Herald that the film is dedicated to Vasquez.

"Pumpkin Guts" premiered at Fantastic Fest in Austin, Texas and Beyond Fest in Los Angeles, California in September 2024. The film was launched online on Halloween via Fangoria who called the film, "Impressive". The film then went on to make Variety's Best Horror list, described by the publication as a "bite-sized jolt of horror", in December 2024 where it was announced the short is being expanded into a feature.

== Feature films ==
On 23 July 2025, Variety revealed that Ferguson was among the filmmakers who directed a segment for V/H/S/Halloween, Shudder's 8th instalment in their horror anthology V/H/S franchise. The film was released in October 2025.

Ferguson announced in The Herald that his feature film debut would in fact be, Dysphonia. The article states the film will move into production late 2024.

== Retrospectives ==
Event	Year	Festival / Organisation	Venue	Country
Spotlight on Bryan M. Ferguson	2015	Ickle Film Festival	GeneratorProjects	Dundee, Scotland
Filmmaker in Focus+ Masterclass	2018	Cellu l'art International Short Film Festival	Volksbad	Jena, Germany
Anatomical Gunk	2018	Matchbox CineClub's Weird Weekend	Centre for Contemporary Arts	Glasgow, Scotland
Irregular Atrocities	2022	London Short Film Festival	Rio Cinema	London, England
Bryan M. Ferguson – Retrospective	2022	The Skinny Magazine	Summerhall	Edinburgh, Scotland
Bryan M. Ferguson Retrospective + Q&A	2022	The Skinny Magazine	Centre for Contemporary Arts	Glasgow, Scotland

== Filmography ==
=== Feature films ===
Title	Year	Segment	Director	Writer	Producer
V/H/S/Halloween	2025	"Diet Phantasma"	Yes	Yes	No

=== Short films ===
Title	Year	Director	Writer	Producer
The Misbehaviour of Polly Paper Cut	2013	Yes	Yes	Yes
Caustic Gulp	2015	Yes	Yes	Yes
Flamingo	2016	Yes	Yes	Yes
Rubber Guillotine	2016	Yes	Yes	Yes
Blockhead	2017	Yes	Yes	Yes
Umbilical Glue	2017	Yes	Yes	Yes
Toxic Haircut	2018	Yes	Yes	Yes
Satanic Panic '87	2019	Yes	Yes	No
Insecticide	2020	Yes	Yes	Yes
Red Room	2021	Yes	Yes	No
Earworm	2022	Yes	Yes	Yes
Pumpkin Guts	2024	Yes	Yes	Yes

=== Music videos ===
Year	Title	Artist
2018	"The Island"	Ladytron
2018	"Hopeless!!!"	Sega Bodega
2018	"Fate"	Boy Harsher
2019	"This Broken Design"	The Ninth Wave
2019	"Deadzone"	Ladytron
2019	"U Suck"	Sega Bodega
2020	"So Long!"	Fish Narc
2020	"New Medication"	Fish Narc
2020	"I'm Only Going To Hurt You"	The Ninth Wave
2020	"Turn Away" (Live From The Void)	Kontravoid
2020	"Make U Stay"	Sega Bodega & Låpsley
2021	"Here Comes Comus!"	Arab Strap
2021	"Love Divide"	Ross from Friends
2021	"Fair Game"	Alice Glass
2022	"Love Is Violence"	Alice Glass
2022	"Monster"	The Soft Moon
2022	"Witness to Your Love"	Garbage
2022	"Hotel Corridors”	Låpsley
2024	"Son"	Molchat Doma
2024	"Until I Die"	Machine Girl
2024	"Performance"	TR/ST
