= Mira Aroyo =

Bulgarian musician

Mira Aroyo Мира Аройо
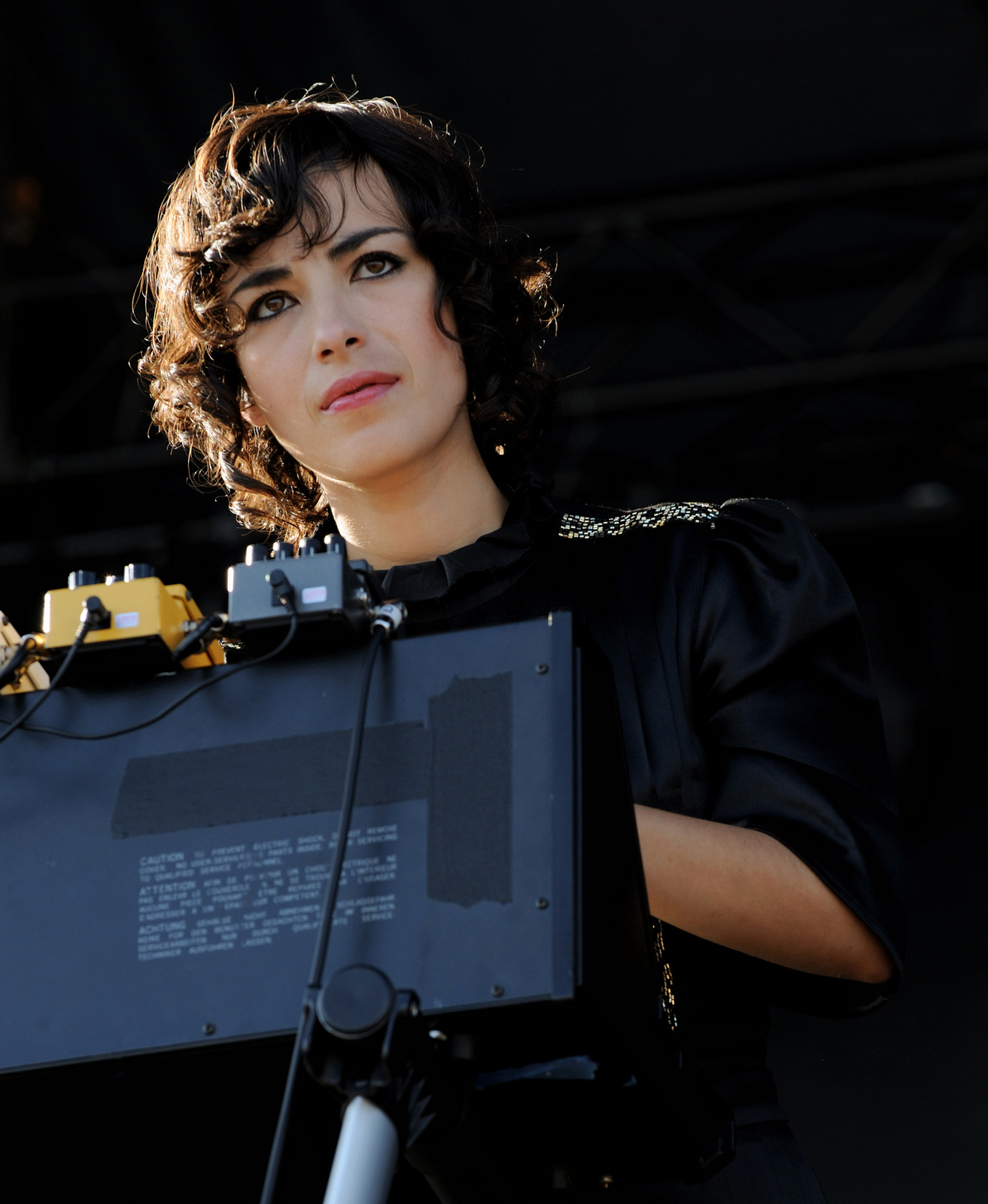
- Aroyo performing in July 2008

Background information
- Born: 11 July 1977 (age 49); Sofia, Bulgaria
- Genres: Electronic; synthpop; new wave
- Occupations: Singer; musician; songwriter; DJ; geneticist
- Instruments: Vocals; synthesizers
- Years active: 1999–present
- Label: Nettwerk
- Member of: Ladytron; The Projects
- Website: ladytron.com

Mira Aroyo (Bulgarian: Мира Аройо, [ˈmirə ɐˈrɔjo]; born 1977) is a Bulgarian-born English singer, musician, songwriter, DJ, and geneticist. She is best known as the keyboardist, co-lead vocalist, and co-songwriter of the electronic band Ladytron, which she co-founded in Liverpool in 1999. She writes and performs her Ladytron lyrics in both Bulgarian and English.

== Early life ==
Aroyo was born in Sofia on 11 July 1977, the daughter of Jewish parents. She moved with her family to Israel when she was 10, and later to England. The first musical instrument that she played was the guitar, having also played the accordion when she was younger. Although her parents were uneasy about her decision to pursue music, they were nevertheless supportive and respectful of her choice of vocation.

== Career ==
=== Scientific career ===
Following the completion of her undergraduate education, Aroyo pursued postgraduate research studies in genetics; she was a doctoral student in the Division of Molecular Genetics at the Department of Biochemistry of the University of Oxford, where she was supervised by Dr. François-Xavier Barre and Professor David J. Sherratt. In 2003, the Department of Biochemistry noted that Aroyo was a postgraduate geneticist and recognised the release of her band's second album, Light and Magic.

Contrary to claims that she completed her DPhil degree, specifically in or around 2002 (though it has also been claimed that, as late as 2008, she was still a candidate), Aroyo left science and her doctoral programme before completing it and graduating. In an interview with The Sunday Mail, she explained that, "We all had jobs when we started Ladytron, then little by little we ditched them. I was a geneticist doing a PhD and realizing lab work wasn't for me. We were doing Ladytron at the same time and I was enjoying it more. It was easier and more fun". In a later interview, when asked, "Apparently you were enrolled as a PhD student in Oxford. Seems like a pretty prestigious post did you ever have any doubts leaving academia for Ladytron?", Aroyo replied, "Yes. For the first 3 years of Ladytron I was juggling both, until it became apparent that I would be compromising both if I continued that way. I was young and it seemed a lot more fun at the time to travel the world playing music".

=== Musical career ===
In the summer of 1999, Liverpool-based producers and DJs Daniel Hunt and Reuben Wu met students Helen Marnie through various DJ gigs and Aroyo through a mutual friend. Sharing similar interests in music, they formed the electronic band Ladytron in the same year. Since then, Aroyo is the secondary singer of the band, and also plays synthesizers and contributes to songwriting.

Aroyo also collaborated with the indie pop band The Projects. The song "Don't Eat Meat" featured her as vocalist. She also collaborated with John Foxx & The Maths for the song "Watching a Building on Fire".

=== Film and TV production career ===
Aroyo was a producer of the 2018 documentary Can You Feel It - How Dance Music Conquered the World.

== Personal life ==
Aroyo married photography curator Harry Hardie in 2010. They have a daughter. They live in London.

Aroyo is a pescetarian and an advocate for animal rights. She has an interest in architecture and presented a 15-minute short film, The Folly, about "the cottage home of an elderly lady who has to adapt to her remote surroundings as she gets older".

== Instruments ==
During Ladytron's live shows, Mira Aroyo plays synthesizers and occasionally sings. Her primary synthesizer is a Korg MS-20, which she has been using since the band's inception.

Aroyo has played the following instruments for Ladytron's live shows:

- Korg MS-20, Jen SX-1000, Stylophone, Speak & Spell (604 tour)
- Korg MS-20, Roland Juno 6 (Light & Magic tour)
- Korg MS-20, Korg MS2000B (Witching Hour and Velocifero tours)
- Korg MS-20 (Best of 00-10 and Gravity the Seducer tours)

During the Witching Hour tour, Ladytron assigned different names to their four Korg MS2000B synthesizers in order to make sound checks easier. Aroyo's MS2000B was named "Babylon."

== Discography ==
=== Ladytron ===
- 604 (2001)
- Light & Magic (2002)
- Witching Hour (2005)
- Velocifero (2008)
- Gravity the Seducer (2011)
- Ladytron (2019)
- Time's Arrow (2023)
- Paradises (2026)
