= Ace of Hz =

Ace of Hz EP

EP by Ladytron
- Released: 11 January 2011
- Genres: Electronic, synthpop
- Length: 30:39
- Label: Nettwerk

Ladytron chronology
The Harmonium Sessions (2026)	Ace of Hz EP (2011)

Professional ratings
Review scores
Source	Rating
Idiomag	(positive)

Ace of Hz EP is the sixth EP by British electronic music band Ladytron. It was released as music download on 11 January 2011 through Nettwerk.

This EP includes the album version of the single "Ace of Hz", plus five remixes of it. Two remixes were made by the well-known trance producer and DJ, Tiësto.

The song "Ace of Hz" appeared in the Ladytron's compilation Best of 00–10 and also on their 2011 studio album, Gravity the Seducer. "Ace of Hz" also featured on the soundtrack of EA Sports video game FIFA 11.

== Track listing ==
1. "Ace of Hz" (Album Version) - 3:37
2. "Ace of Hz" (Punks Jump Up Remix) - 4:53
3. "Ace of Hz" (Tiësto Remix) - 7:25
4. "Ace of Hz" (Tiësto Remix Radio Edit) - 3:36
5. "Ace of Hz" (NYCPARTYINFO Remix) - 6:14
6. "Ace of Hz" (Punks Jump Up Dub Remix) - 4:54

== Credits ==
- Cover: Neil Krug
- Design: Trevor Tarczynski
- Producer: Daniel Hunt
- Production Manager: Wendy Stenzel
- Written by: Ladytron
