= Korova (Liverpool) =

Former music venue in Liverpool, UK

Coordinates: 53.403°N 2.979°W

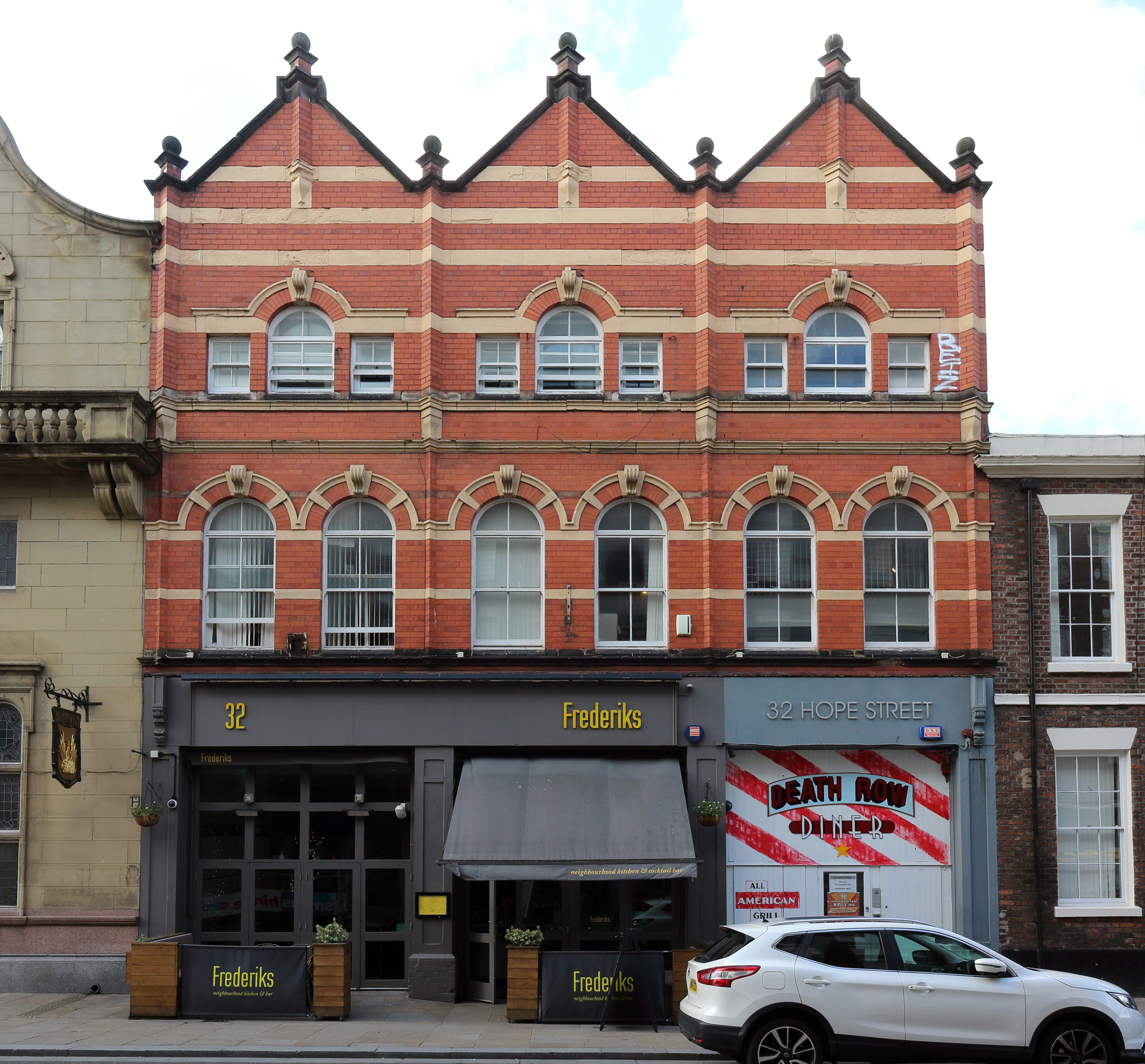
- The building in 2018; still a bar, diner and music venue
- Interactive map of Korova
- Address: Hope Street
- Location: Liverpool, England
- Type: Bar, restaurant, music venue
- Events: Live music, indie, rock

Construction
- Opened: 2009 (current premises)

Korova was a bar, music venue and restaurant located at 32 Hope Street, Liverpool, England. Before moving to its final premises, it was located on Fleet Street close to Concert Square. Its name referenced the Korova Milk Bar from A Clockwork Orange.. It has since been relaunched as "Frederick's".

== History ==
Korova was created through a joint venture between restaurateur Rob Gutmann, promoter Steve Miller and Daniel Hunt and Reuben Wu of electronic band Ladytron in September 2005. The concept for the venue was based upon Ladytron's club night EVOL.

The original Korova, located on Fleet Street, appeared on the album cover for the Arctic Monkeys first album Whatever People Say I Am, That's What I'm Not. The cover depicts Chris McClure – a friend of the band – in the basement of the venue posing for a photo to mark the band's good memories of Liverpool.

In 2009, Korova moved to new premises on Hope Street in Liverpool city centre.

=== Fire ===
On 17 April 2010, 60 firefighters fought a major blaze, which occurred in a solicitors office located above Korova. The severity of the fire saw the first and second floors of the solicitor's collapse with Korova itself suffering significant water damage. Due to the structural instability of the above floors, it was expected that the venue will remain closed for the foreseeable future, although promoters stated at the time that the venue will reopen as soon as possible. It was announced that Korova would be reopening in September 2013 by a copycat business. Many visitors were unhappy with its revival.

== Live music ==
Numerous bands have performed live concerts in Korova including: The Little Flames, Alterkicks, Hot Club de Paris, The Sunshine Underground, The Robocop Kraus, Simian Mobile Disco, The Wombats, Hot Chip, Paul Epworth, Djs Are Not Rockstars, Adult, White Rose Movement, The Rumble Strips, Fujiya & Miyagi, The Shortwave Set, The Long Blondes, Pánico, The Spinto Band, The Kooks, Fields, Idiot Pilot, The Whip, The KBC, Neils Children, Frank Turner, Rolo Tomassi, Japandroids, The Noisettes, Jeffrey & Jack Lewis, The Juan Maclean, Ladytron, 2manydjs, Reverend and the Makers, CSS, The Rascals, Vivian Girls, Chromeo, dan le sac vs Scroobius Pip, Health, and Friendly Fires.
