= Reuben Wu =

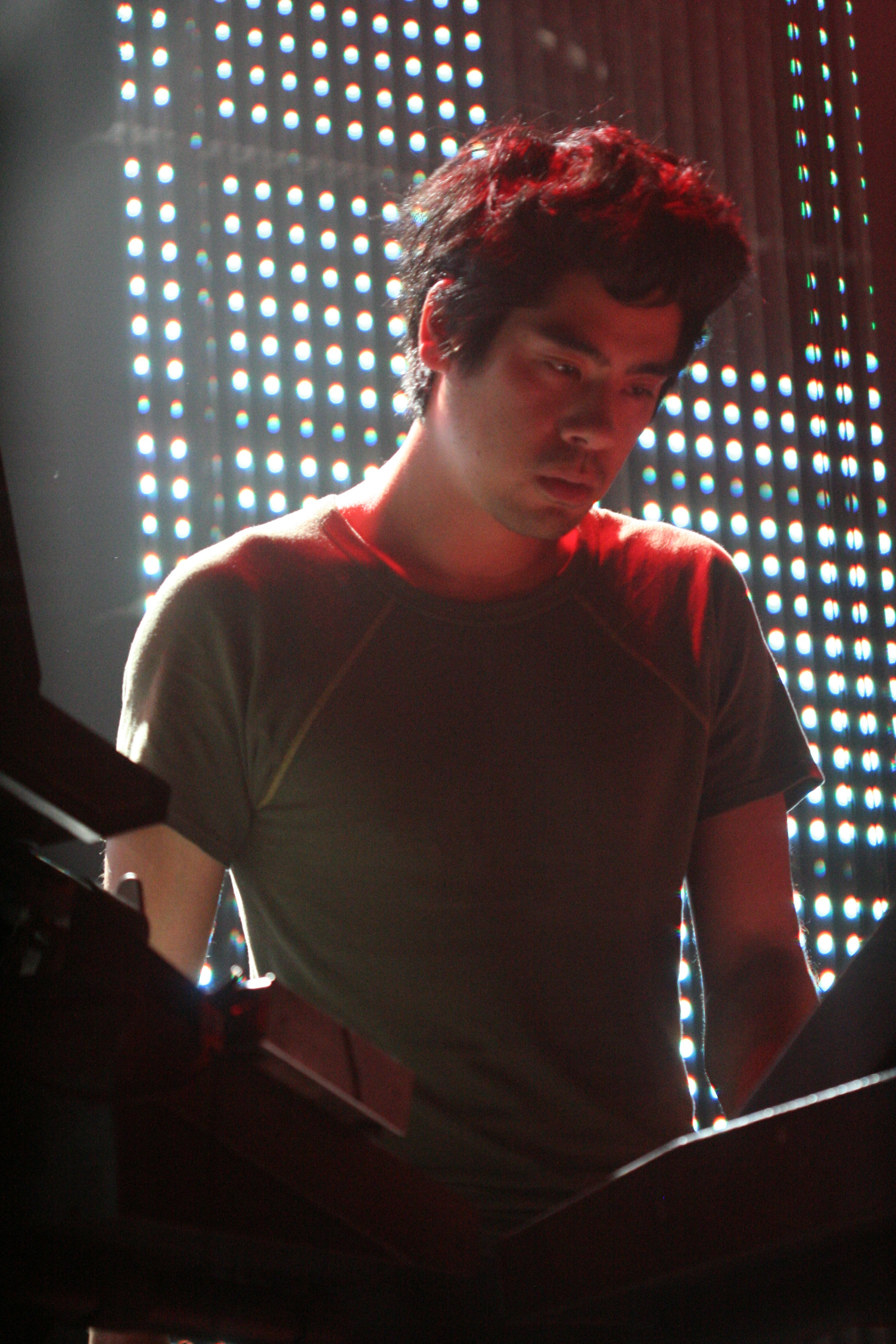
- Wu performing in April 2009

Background information
- Born: 6 September 1975 (age 51)
- Origin: Liverpool, England
- Genres: Electronic, synthpop, new wave
- Occupations: Artist, photographer, musician
- Instrument: Synthesizers
- Years active: 1999–2023
- Label: Nettwerk
- Member of: Ladytron
- Website: www.ladytron.com www.reubenwu.com

Reuben Wu (born 6 September 1975) is a British artist, photographer, and musician. He is also known as a founding member of the electronic band Ladytron.

== Biography ==
Reuben Wu was born in Liverpool in 1975, the son of Hongkonger immigrants. He trained in industrial design at Sheffield Hallam University, graduating in 1997. Meanwhile, he met Daniel Hunt in Liverpool in 1994; they formed Ladytron in 1999, along with Mira Aroyo and Helen Marnie. Wu finished his MSc in 1998 at the University of Liverpool. He worked as an industrial designer until going full-time with the band in 2002.

Wu and Hunt launched the Liverpool nightclub Evol in 2003 and bar/music venue Korova in 2005.

Wu co-wrote and produced two songs "Birds of Prey" and "Little Dreamer" for Christina Aguilera's 2010 album Bionic.

Utilizing his skill an artist and designer, Wu illustrated the artwork of the UK edition of Ladytron's first album 604 and was introduced to photography by documenting his travels on tour with the band. His own visual art career began later in 2012 once the band took a sabbatical and he was able to focus full-time on his own creative output. Wu has since created artistic content for GE, Apple's Mac OS Big Sur wallpapers, Mercedes-Benz, Google and Interscope amongst others.

In 2017, Wu was commissioned to photograph the artwork for Zedd and Alessia Cara's double-platinum single "Stay" and Zedd & Liam Payne's single "Get Low" in collaboration with Samuel Burgess-Johnson.

Wu became a National Geographic photographer in 2022 after having his first assignment published in the magazine, a cover story on Stonehenge for the August issue. For this story, he used his unconventional drone lighting technique to illuminate the ancient megalith at night. In March 2023, the Stonehenge story won "Online Storytelling Project of the Year" in the Pictures of the Year International Competition, an annual contest for documentary photographers and photojournalists and part of Pictures of the Year International.

In March 2023, Wu announced his departure from Ladytron citing growing commitments to his photography and art career.

== Instruments ==
During Ladytron's live shows, Reuben Wu played synthesizers. The Korg MS-10 was his primary synthesizer for the first four Ladytron tours.

Wu played live the following instruments for Ladytron's live shows:

- Korg MS-10, Roland SH-2 (604 tour)
- Korg MS-10, Korg Mono/Poly (Light & Magic tour)
- Korg MS-10, Korg MS2000B (Witching Hour tour)
- Korg MS-10, Korg MS2000B, Minimoog Voyager (Velocifero tour)
- Minimoog Voyager (Best of 00-10 and Gravity the Seducer tours)

During the Witching Hour tour, Ladytron assigned different names to their four Korg MS2000B synthesizers in order to make sound checks easier. Wu's MS2000B was named "Gloria."

== Discography ==
=== Ladytron ===
- 604 (2001)
- Light & Magic (2002)
- Witching Hour (2005)
- Velocifero (2008)
- Gravity the Seducer (2011)
- Ladytron (2019)
- Time's Arrow (2023)
