= Paradises (album) =

Studio album by Ladytron
- Released: 20 March 2026
- Genre: Electronic
- Length: 71:31
- Label: Nettwerk
- Producer: Daniel Hunt

Ladytron chronology
Time's Arrow (2023)	Paradises (2026)

Singles from Paradises
- 1. "I Believe in You" Released: 5 September 2025; 2. "I See Red" Released: 17 October 2025; 3. "Kingdom Undersea" Released: 21 November 2025; 4. "Caught in the Blink of an Eye" Released: 26 December 2025; 5. "A Death in London" Released: 6 February 2026; 6. "Evergreen" Released: 20 March 2026

Paradises is the eighth studio album by English electronic band Ladytron, released on 20 March 2026 via the label Nettwerk. It is their first album as a trio following Reuben Wu's departure in 2023, which occurred shortly after the release of their preceding studio album Time's Arrow.

== Promotion and singles ==
In 2025, Ladytron released four singles from the album. The first, "I Believe You", was revealed on 5 September, followed by another single, "I See Red", on 17 October. Band member Daniel Hunt directed the music videos for both songs. Then on 21 November, with the announcement for the album, they released "Kingdom Undersea" as the third single with another music video. The fourth single, "Caught in the Blink of an Eye", was released on 26 December. Its corresponding music video was shot in São Paulo, Brazil and was again directed by Hunt.

On 6 January 2026, the band announced a five-date U.S. tour spanning 29 May to 3 June that year. "A Death in London" followed on 6 February as the fifth single, accompanied by a black-and-white music video. Coinciding with the release of Paradises, the band revealed the sixth single, "Evergreen", with another video.

== Critical reception ==
Professional ratings
Aggregate scores
Source	Rating
AnyDecentMusic?	6.7/10
Metacritic	72/100
Review scores
Source	Rating
AllMusic	3.5/5 stars
The Arts Desk	3/5 stars
Classic Pop	4/5 stars
God Is in the TV	6/10
Mojo	3/5 stars
MusicOMH	3/5 stars
Pitchfork	7.0/10
The Skinny	3/5 stars
Uncut	8/10
Under the Radar	8/10

According to the review aggregator Metacritic, Paradises received "generally favorable reviews" based on a weighted average score of 72 out of 100 from eight critic scores. The review aggregator AnyDecentMusic? gave the album a weighted average score of 6.7 out of 10 from ten critic scores.

== Track listing ==
All music is composed by Daniel Hunt, except where noted.

Paradises track listing
No.	Title	Music	Length
1.	"I Believe in You"		5:02
2.	"In Blood"		4:56
3.	"Kingdom Undersea"		4:46
4.	"I See Red"		3:50
5.	"A Death in London"		4:44
6.	"Secret Dreams of Thieves"	Daniel Hunt; Mira Aroyo	4:13
7.	"Sing"	Helen Lindsay Marnie	3:51
8.	"Free, Free"		6:00
9.	"Metaphysica"		4:40
10.	"Caught in the Blink of an Eye"		3:44
11.	"Evergreen"		5:21
12.	"Ordinary Love"	Marnie	4:28
13.	"We Wrote Our Names in the Dust"		5:09
14.	"Heatwaves"		1:15
15.	"Solid Light"	Hunt; Aroyo	4:29
16.	"For a Life in London"		5:03
Total length:			71:31

== Personnel ==
Credits adapted from Tidal.

- Ladytron – performer
- Daniel Hunt – production, mixing
- Daniel Woodward, Marcus Locock – engineering
- Jim Abbiss – mixing
- Andres Mesa – immersive mixing
- Andy Baldwin – mastering

== Charts ==
Chart performance for Paradises
Chart (2026)	Peak position
Scottish Albums (Official Charts)	25
UK Albums Sales (OCC)	9
UK Independent Albums (Official Charts)	4
