= Ladytron =

English band

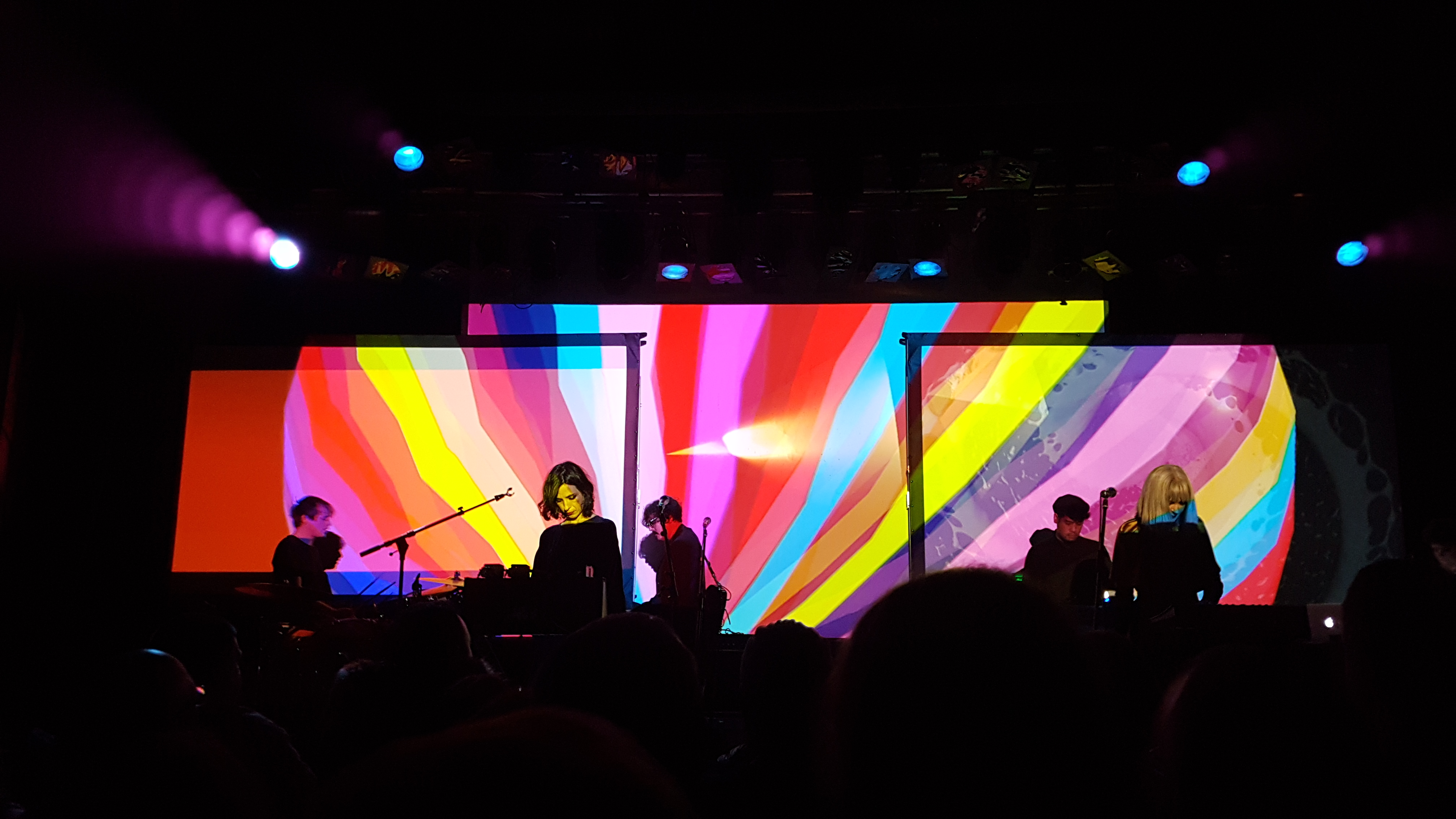
- Ladytron performing in 2018; left to right: Peter Kelly, Mira Aroyo, Daniel Hunt, Reuben Wu, and Helen Marnie

Background information
- Origin: Liverpool, England
- Genres: Electropop; synth-pop; electronic rock
- Years active: 1999–present
- Labels: Ladytron Music; Nettwerk; Island; Rykodisc; Telstar; Emperor Norton; Invicta Hi-Fi; Cooking Vinyl
- Members: Helen Marnie; Mira Aroyo; Daniel Hunt
- Past members: Reuben Wu
- Website: ladytron.com

Ladytron are a British electronic band formed in Liverpool in 1999. The group consists of Helen Marnie (lead vocals, synthesizers), Mira Aroyo (vocals, synthesizers), and Daniel Hunt (synthesizers, guitar, vocals). Reuben Wu (synthesizers) was a member from 1999 until 2023. They have released eight studio albums to date: 604 (2001), Light & Magic (2002), Witching Hour (2005), Velocifero (2008), Gravity the Seducer (2011), Ladytron (2019), Time's Arrow (2023) and Paradises (2026). They also issued the live album Live at London Astoria 16.07.08 in 2009, and the compilation album Best of 00–10 in 2011. They have produced remixes for a diverse list of artists, such as Depeche Mode's Dave Gahan, Erasure, Goldfrapp, Apoptygma Berzerk, Placebo, Blondie, Gang of Four, Christina Aguilera, Nine Inch Nails, Bloc Party, Kings of Convenience and Soulwax.

The band's name was taken from the song "Ladytron" by Roxy Music. Former Roxy Music member Brian Eno said in 2009, "Ladytron are, for me, the best of English pop music. They're the kind of band that really only appears in England, with this funny mixture of eccentric art-school dicking around and dressing up, with a full awareness of what's happening everywhere musically, which is kind of knitted together and woven into something quite new." Ladytron described their sound as "electronic pop", while music journalists have also described their sound as synth-pop, electronic rock, among other genres. Some of the group's songs contain lyrics written by Aroyo in her native Bulgarian.

== History ==
=== Band formation and debut single ===
Liverpudlian producers and DJs Daniel Hunt and Reuben Wu met in the 1990s. Hunt was a member of the bands Venini and Jules Verne and also founded the indie record label Invicta Hi-Fi and a nightclub. Wu trained in industrial design at Sheffield Hallam University and graduated in 1997. He became an industrial designer at Team Consulting Limited, until finally going full-time with the band around 2002.

Using a moniker inspired by the song "Ladytron" by Roxy Music, Hunt and Wu recorded the debut single "He Took Her to a Movie" for £50 with the guest vocalist Lisa Eriksson (who later formed the band Techno Squirrels) and released it in July 1999.

In the summer of 1999, Hunt and Wu met Scottish student Helen Marnie through various DJ gigs, and Bulgarian-Israeli Mira Aroyo through a mutual friend. Marnie and Aroyo joined the band as vocalists and keyboardists. Helen Marnie studied music at the University of Liverpool where she received a Bachelor of Arts in pop music in 1999. Mira Aroyo was a postgraduate research geneticist in the Department of Biochemistry, University of Oxford.

=== First EPs and 604 (1999–2001) ===
During 1999 and 2001 Ladytron released the EPs Miss Black and Her Friends in December 1999 exclusively in Japan, Commodore Rock in June 2000, Mu-Tron EP in October 2000 and the singles "Play Girl / Commodore Rock" in 2000, "Playgirl" in 2000 and again in 2001, "The Way That I Found You" in 2001. All the songs (except "Miss Black", "Olivetti Jerk" and the remixes) from these releases were later included on their debut studio album. "He Took Her to a Movie", Mu-Tron EP, "The Way That I Found You", were all selected as NME "Single of the Week".

Ladytron released the debut album 604 on 6 February 2001 on Emperor Norton (US), on 26 March 2001 on Labels (Germany) and on 2 April 2001 on Invicta Hi-Fi (UK). It was re-released on 20 July 2004 on Emperor Norton (US) and on 14 January 2011 (Germany), 18 January 2011 (US), 24 January 2011 (UK) on Nettwerk. 604 has been written mostly by Daniel Hunt and co-produced by him and Lance Thomas (who also engineered and mixed the album).

The band wore uniforms inspired by the science fiction movie The Andromeda Strain until the end of 2003. Daniel Hunt said in an interview for Jound from 2001: "I'm really into The Andromeda Strain, so that's kind of an influence on the title of the album and the uniforms we've got and stuff. But the design – me and Reuben just love that film". Also in an interview for Chaos Control magazine from 2002 Hunt explained the 604 album title: "It's the area code for British Columbia... we're glad we've attached this strange importance to that number, it crops up everywhere now. We noticed when we stayed in Hamburg in Germany (in a hotel called "Commodore" – pure coincidence), that the number to phone reception from your room was '604'. Moments afterwards the building had caught fire and we were lucky to escape with our lives. I'm not joking".

Ladytron performed on 4 August 2001 at Festival Internacional de Benicàssim in Spain, on 10 August 2001 at La Route du Rock in France, and on 26 August 2001 at Reading Festival in the UK. On 5 December 2001, they performed four songs for Radio 1's John Peel Show.

On 1 October 2001, the compilation album Reproductions: Songs of The Human League was released on Carrot Top Records and it included The Human League' song "Open Your Heart" covered by Ladytron.

=== Light and Magic (2002–2003) ===
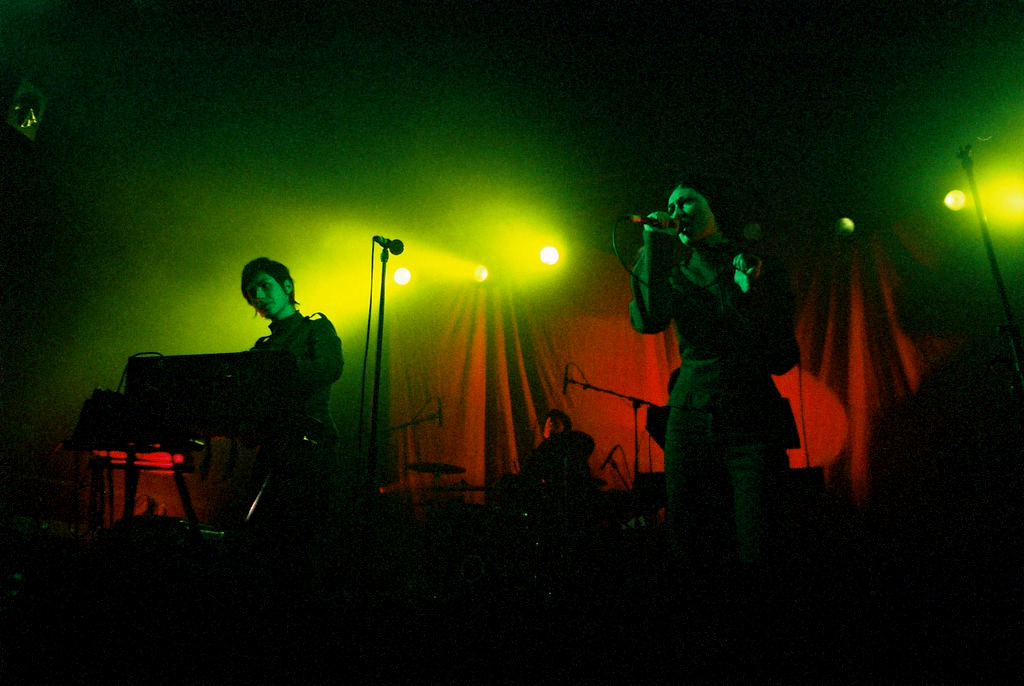
Ladytron live in London, 2003

Their second album Light & Magic was released on 17 September 2002 at Emperor Norton Records (US) and Telstar (UK). The album was also released on 7 April 2003 at Warner Music (Germany) and on 21 June 2003 at Victor Entertainment (Japan). It was re-released on 20 July 2004 on Emperor Norton (US) and on 14 January 2011 (Germany)/18 January 2011 (US)/24 January 2011 (UK) on Nettwerk.

Light & Magic featured a darker sound than their previous album. It was written and produced in Los Angeles by the band and co-produced by Mickey Petralia. The album included the underground hits "Seventeen", "Blue Jeans" and "Evil". They also issued in 2003 a limited 7" single, "Cracked LCD / USA vs. White Noise".

They toured over a year to support the album. On 4 December 2002, Ladytron returned to John Peel Show and performed live 11 songs from their first 2 albums.

In 2002, Ladytron rescored the 1982 Tron film for a live event in London.

On 7 October 2003, they issued the mix compilation Softcore Jukebox on Emperor Norton. Besides the songs of other artists, the compilation also includes two of their own songs, the single remix of "Blue Jeans" renamed "Blue Jeans 2.0" and a cover of Tweet's "Oops (Oh My)".

=== Witching Hour (2004–2007) ===
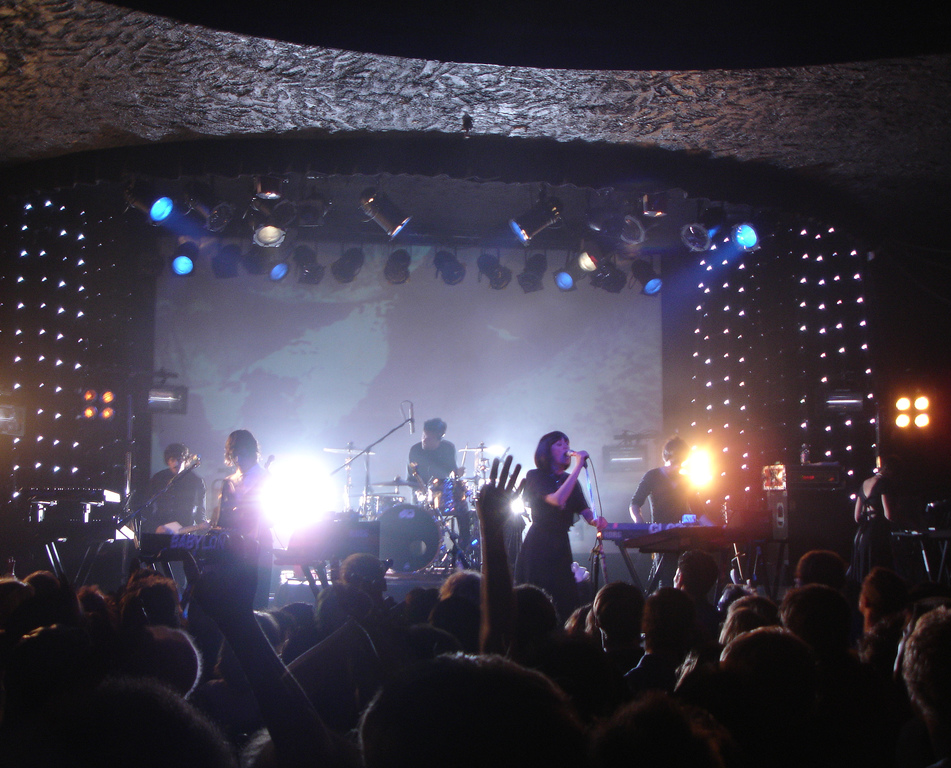
Ladytron live in Seattle, 2006

Ladytron began working on demos for their next album immediately after concluding Light & Magic tour with a homecoming gig in Liverpool in September 2003, where they were supported by Franz Ferdinand. Within a few months, they had mapped out the entire record and by the time they were ready to start recording in April 2004, their UK label Telstar Records had gone into administration. Their US label, Emperor Norton, also had problems: the company was purchased by Rykodisc in 2004 and was then shut down later that year, with Rykodisc inheriting its back-catalogue. The band announced on 7 December 2004 that they signed to Island Records.

In 2004, Ladytron were booked to play a series of shows in China as part of an exhibition tour set up by the British Council. They played on 24 and 25 September 2004 in Shenzhen, 28 September 2004 in Chongqing, 6 October 2004 and 7 October 2004 (DJ set) in Shanghai.

Ladytron released their critically acclaimed third studio album Witching Hour on 3 October 2005 on Island (UK) and later in other territories. Island Records also released a limited edition of this album in the form of a 2 disc set: a CD with the album and a DVD of video from the tour of China ("Once Upon a Time in the East: Ladytron in China") plus 3 music videos ("Destroy Everything You Touch", "Sugar", "Seventeen"). Witching Hour was re-released on 5 April 2007 on Major (Germany), on 5 November 2007 on So Sweet (UK), and on 18 January 2011 (US)/24 January 2011 (UK) on Nettwerk.

The album was recorded in 2004 at Elevator Studios in Liverpool and it was produced by Ladytron and Jim Abbiss. It featured Pop Levi on bass, live drums by Keith York and electric guitars mixed with their trademark sound. Pitchfork described it as a "quantum leap record". The songs "Sugar", "Destroy Everything You Touch", "International Dateline", "Weekend", and "Soft Power" were issued as singles. "Destroy Everything You Touch" (sample) became the band's best known song.

In 2006 saw the light Extended Play, a two-disc EP CD/DVD compilation that featured exclusive unreleased remixes and B-sides, as well as a DVD with the same content as the one from Witching Hour limited edition. Also in 2006 Ladytron recorded and released the live EP The Harmonium Sessions with 4 songs from their third album.

Without any real label support, Ladytron toured exhaustively over the next two years, on the strength of their cult following. They played in North America, Europe, and South America. In early 2007, they also opened for the European shows of Nine Inch Nails, at the invitation of Trent Reznor.

=== Velocifero (2007–2009) ===
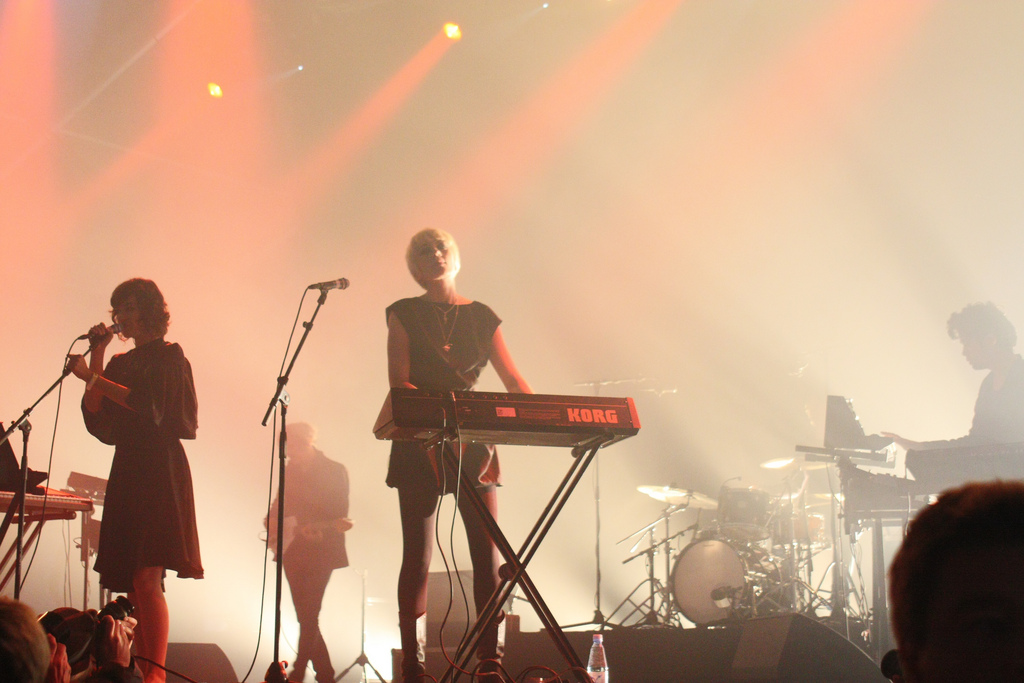
Ladytron live, 2009

Ladytron were dropped by Island Records and signed to Nettwerk in late 2007.

Between 2007 and 2008, the band recorded the follow-up to Witching Hour at Studio de la Grande Armée in Paris with help from Alessandro Cortini (Modwheelmood, Nine Inch Nails, SONOIO) and Vicarious Bliss (Justice, DJ Mehdi). On 2 June 2008, Ladytron released their fourth album Velocifero on Nettwerk. The band stated that "velocifero" literally means "bringer of speed" and is also the name of a classic retro styled scooter. The album spawned three singles: "Ghosts", "Runaway" and "Tomorrow".

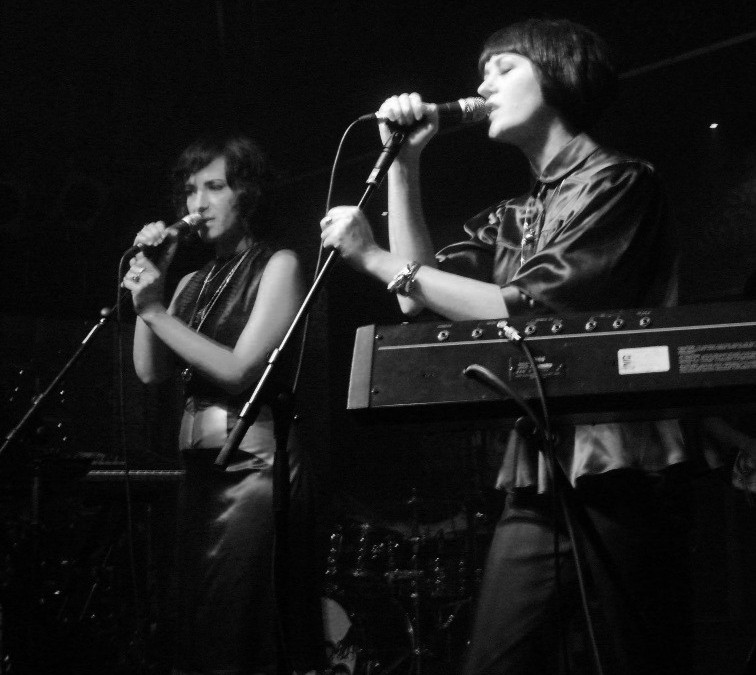
Ladytron in Coventry, 2008

In mid 2008, the group composed three exclusive tracks performed in Simlish for The Sims 3 game soundtrack: "Rockfalls & Estuaries", "She Stepped Out of the Car" and "Young Etruscians". Ladytron sang a song titled "Use Your Mind" on Nickelodeon's Yo Gabba Gabba!.

On 6 April 2009, Nettwerk issued the remix compilation Velocifero (Remixed & Rare).

In 2009, Ladytron toured North America with The Faint, and performed two special shows with Brian Eno at the Sydney Opera House. In the same year they announced that they would be the opening act for Depeche Mode on a few concerts in Eastern Europe, but these concerts were cancelled due to Dave Gahan's illness.

Also in 2009 Ladytron self-released their first live album Live at London Astoria 16.07.08, and co-wrote and produced a few songs for Christina Aguilera. The songs "Birds of Prey" and "Little Dreamer" were released as bonus tracks on the deluxe edition of her 2010 album Bionic, and "Birds of Prey" was later named as one of the "Best Deep Cuts by 21st Century Pop Stars" by the Billboard magazine.

=== Best of 00–10 and Gravity the Seducer (2010–2011) ===
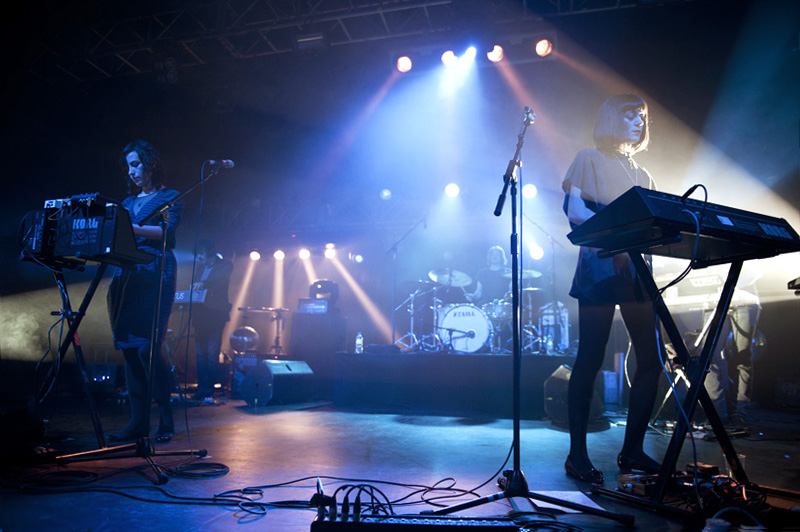
Ladytron live in London, 2011

The soundtrack of the video game FIFA 11 included a new Ladytron song, "Ace of Hz", which was also released as digital single on 30 November 2010. On 11 January 2011, the band issued the music download Ace of Hz EP, which contained the album mix as well as five remixes.

On 28 March 2011, it was released the compilation Best of 00–10 featuring 17 tracks on standard edition and 33 tracks on deluxe edition plus an 80-page booklet. Both editions included two extra tracks, "Ace of Hz" and a cover version of Death in June's "Little Black Angel". Also in 2011, Nettwerk reissued all their previous albums, the remix compilation Best of Remixes and the iTunes video compilation Best of 00–10 Videos which included music videos for the singles "Playgirl", "Blue Jeans", "Seventeen", "Sugar", "Destroy Everything You Touch", "Ghosts", "Runaway", "Tomorrow" and "Ace of Hz". On 20 December 2011, Nettwerk issued the remix compilations 604 (Remixed & Rare), Light & Magic (Remixed & Rare) and Witching Hour (Remixed & Rare).

During April 2011 and July 2011, Ladytron performed live in Austria, China, Russia, Finland, Sweden, Poland, UK, Ireland, Hungary and Spain.

Their fifth studio album, Gravity the Seducer, was released in the United Kingdom on 12 September 2011 and in the United States on 13 September 2011. The album was recorded in Kent's countryside and it was produced by Ladytron and Barny Barnicott (Arctic Monkeys, Kasabian, Editors). Daniel Hunt said that "Gravity the Seducer is more of a jump than the last album was, more ethereal and melodic, a touch more abstract in places than we've gone before, baroque 'n' roll".

"Ace of Hz", which appears on the album, was previously released as a single from the band's greatest hits compilation Best of 00–10. The first single from Gravity the Seducer, "White Elephant", was issued on 17 May 2011 and its accompanying video was posted on YouTube on 26 July 2011. The band released two more singles, "Ambulances" on 16 June 2011 and "Mirage" on 8 August 2011. The music video for "Mirage" was posted on YouTube on 11 November 2011.

During September 2011 and December 2011, the band toured in United States, Mexico, Canada, Brazil, Chile, Thailand, Indonesia, and Singapore. For the concerts in North America, Ladytron were supported by SONOIO, VHS or Beta and Geographer.

=== Hiatus and side projects (2012–2015) ===
The soundtrack of the video game The Sims 3: Supernatural included a new Ladytron instrumental track, "Tesla".

Using her surname as a stage name, Helen Marnie started in 2012 a solo career. She self-released through PledgeMusic her debut solo album Crystal World on 11 June 2013. The album was produced in 2012 in Reykjavík, Iceland by her bandmate Daniel Hunt in collaboration with the Icelandic musician Barði Jóhannsson. Marnie released a second solo album titled Strange Words and Weird Wars on 2 June 2017 on Disco Pinata. This album was recorded at Chem19 Studio, Glasgow and produced by Jonny Scott.

On 22 February 2013, Ladytron premiered the "International Dateline" music video. It was shot in 2006 during Witching Hour era, left unfinished, rediscovered and finished by Daniel Hunt in 2012.

On 29 November 2013, Ladytron released the remix album Gravity the Seducer Remixed, a collection of remixes of Gravity the Seducer songs.

Ladytron featured shortly on the section "Resurgence" of the 2014 music documentary Beautiful Noise. This documentary also features several short interviews with Daniel Hunt.

=== Self-titled album and Time's Arrow (2016–2021) ===
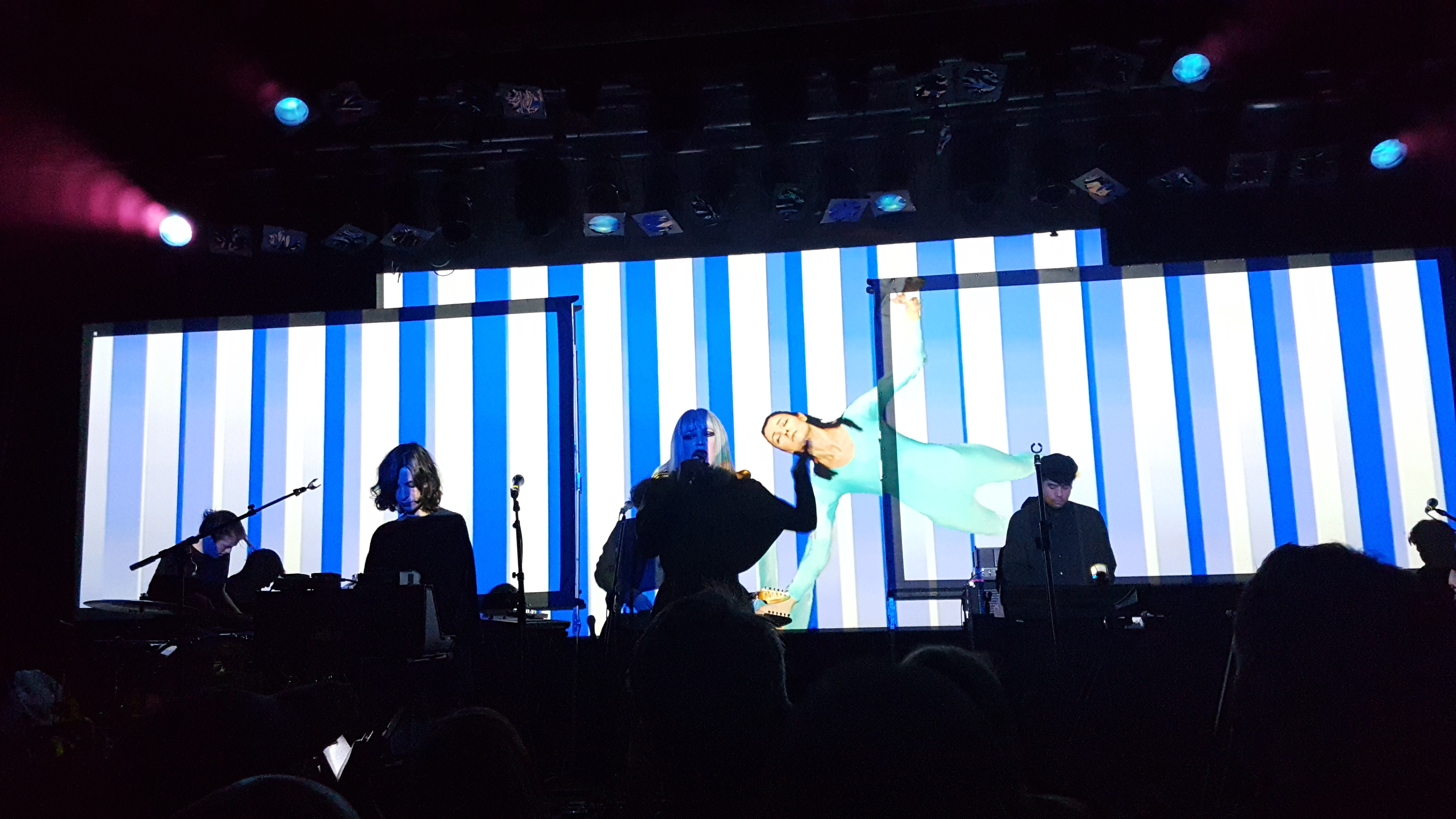
Ladytron at QMU, Glasgow, 2 November 2018

On 18 July 2016, the band posted on their official website: "After a five year hiatus following the release of their fifth album Gravity the Seducer, another chapter in Ladytron's story is about to begin." On 26 November 2016, Ladytron posted on Instagram an image with a SSL recording console, implying that the recording of their sixth album started. On 28 February 2018, Ladytron started a PledgeMusic campaign to finish recording and releasing their new album. On the same day they released the first single "The Animals". On 16 August the band premiered the single "The Island". The track was accompanied by a disturbing short film directed by Bryan M. Ferguson.

On 10 October the band announced that the new album would be titled Ladytron and released on 15 February 2019 through their own Ladytron Music imprint via !K7. PledgeMusic suspended operations in February 2019, after repeated cases of failing to pay artists. The band subsequently issued updates stating that while much of the merchandise had never been made, they had been able to buy the vinyl and CDs from PledgeMusic's administrators and were in the process of sending them out to subscribers who were willing to pay for the postage.

On 16 September 2019 Ladytron premiered the music video for "Deadzone". The video was directed by frequent collaborator Bryan M. Ferguson.

On 4 February 2020 Ladytron premiered the music video of "Tower of Glass".

=== Light & Magic 20th anniversary, Wu's departure and Paradises (2022–present) ===
In April 2022, Light & Magic was given a 20th anniversary digital reissue on streaming services. The band also shared a series of unreleased music videos from the era, including one for the album's title track. The album was ultimately reissued on vinyl in April 2024.

Ladytron announced the release of their seventh studio album, Time's Arrow for January 2023, alongside the release of the single "City of Angels" in October 2022. On 14 March 2023, Wu announced on Twitter that he had left the band due to his commitments to his art and photography career in the United States.

On 4 September 2025, they released their first single as a trio, "I Believe in You". This was followed in October with the release of another single, "I See Red". In November, the band officially announced their eighth studio album Paradises, released on 20 March 2026. The band released the album's third single, "Kingdom Undersea", to coincide with the album's announcement.

== Side projects ==
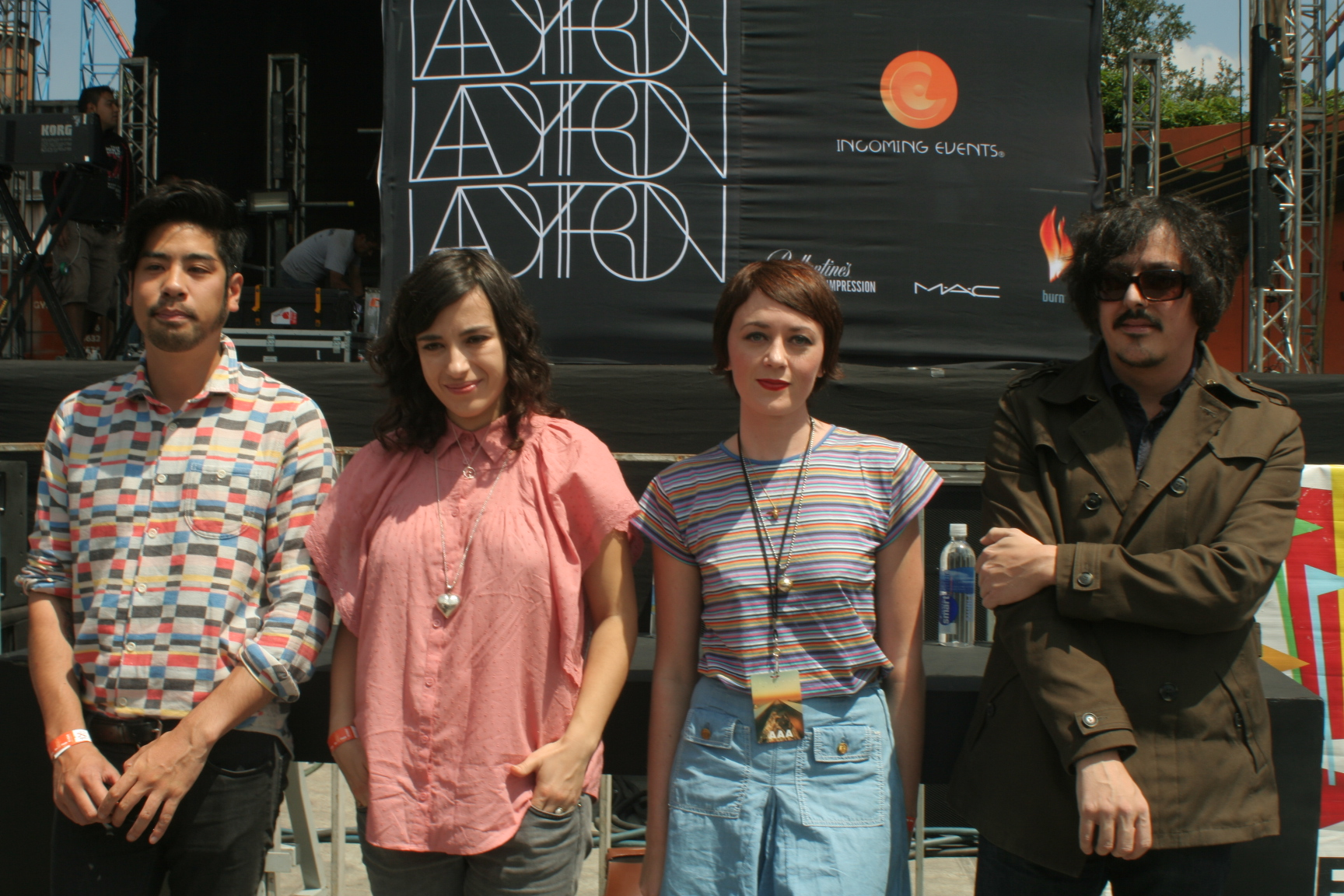
Ladytron in Mexico, 2011

All band members are also involved in various side projects. Besides touring, each member plays DJ sets (solo and with other band members) in clubs and events around the world.

Ladytron have produced remixes for many artists, including Dave Gahan, Erasure, Goldfrapp, Apoptygma Berzerk, Placebo, Blondie, Gang of Four, Christina Aguilera, Nine Inch Nails, Bloc Party, Kings of Convenience, Soulwax and Róisín Murphy.

Using her surname as stage name, Helen Marnie released 2 solo albums: Crystal World on 11 June 2013 and Strange Words and Weird Wars on 2 June 2017.

Daniel Hunt worked on several movie scores, including that of Would You Rather in collaboration with Icelandic musician Barði Jóhannsson. Hunt also produced Marnie's album, Crystal World. He started the band Tamoios with singer Luisa Maita, and Fernando Rischbieter, in 2014, in São Paulo, Brazil.

Reuben Wu is an accomplished photographer. He posted a selection of photos on his own website and he also released in 2011 a book with a collection of photographs from an expedition with a friend on Svalbard in the same year.

Hunt, Wu and DJ Revo opened the Liverpool club night Evol in September 2003. In September 2005, Hunt and Wu helped by some collaborators, opened the Liverpool bar/restaurant/music venue Korova.

Mira Aroyo collaborated with John Foxx and the Maths and The Projects. She has also worked on some documentaries, providing original scores.

Ladytron are credited as co-writers and producers of the bonus songs "Birds of Prey" and "Little Dreamer" from the 2010 album Bionic by Christina Aguilera.

== Music style ==
Ladytron have described their sound as "electronic pop", with music journalists similarly describing their sound as electropop. They focused on a balance between pop structures and experimental sounds. Their sound has also been described as synth-pop, electronic rock, post-punk revival, new wave, shoegaze, witch house, and art pop. While some writers have labelled Ladytron as an electroclash act, others have claimed that they are not entirely electroclash and Ladytron members have also rejected the term, with Daniel Hunt and Helen Marnie commenting:

We felt being compared to the day-glo trash-aesthetic of electroclash didn't make any sense. We were wise enough to know that being positioned by the press at the forefront of it, despite our protestations, would mean we bore the brunt of the backlash when it inevitably came. However, that happened anyway, and we survived.

— Daniel Hunt

We were always lumped in with bands we sounded nothing like and often didn't have much in common with. That was what made us uncomfortable. For that reason, we just tried to avoid any connection with the term. Our sound is never reactionary to outside elements, it's always natural and down to experiences.

— Helen Marnie

Reuben Wu said about the process of making a new Ladytron album:

We start writing individually. We've never really lived in the same city before. We've always been geographically apart. ... It's always been first as individuals, and then reviewing everything together, and then working on each other's songs. That's how we've always worked. And it goes well with how we make music. We do get together down the line and in the studio when we start fleshing out the tracks.

Quietus critic Simon Price situated the band within a distinct regional artistic lineage, writing, "Ladytron may have been formed in Liverpool but, unlike many from that city, are not remotely indebted to the Beatles. Instead they belong to the art school/post punk strand of Merseyside music which includes Deaf School, Yachts, OMD, Dalek I Love You, Wah! Heat, The Teardrop Explodes, A Flock of Seagulls, Lori and the Chameleons, Dead or Alive and [Echo &] the Bunnymen."

== Touring ==
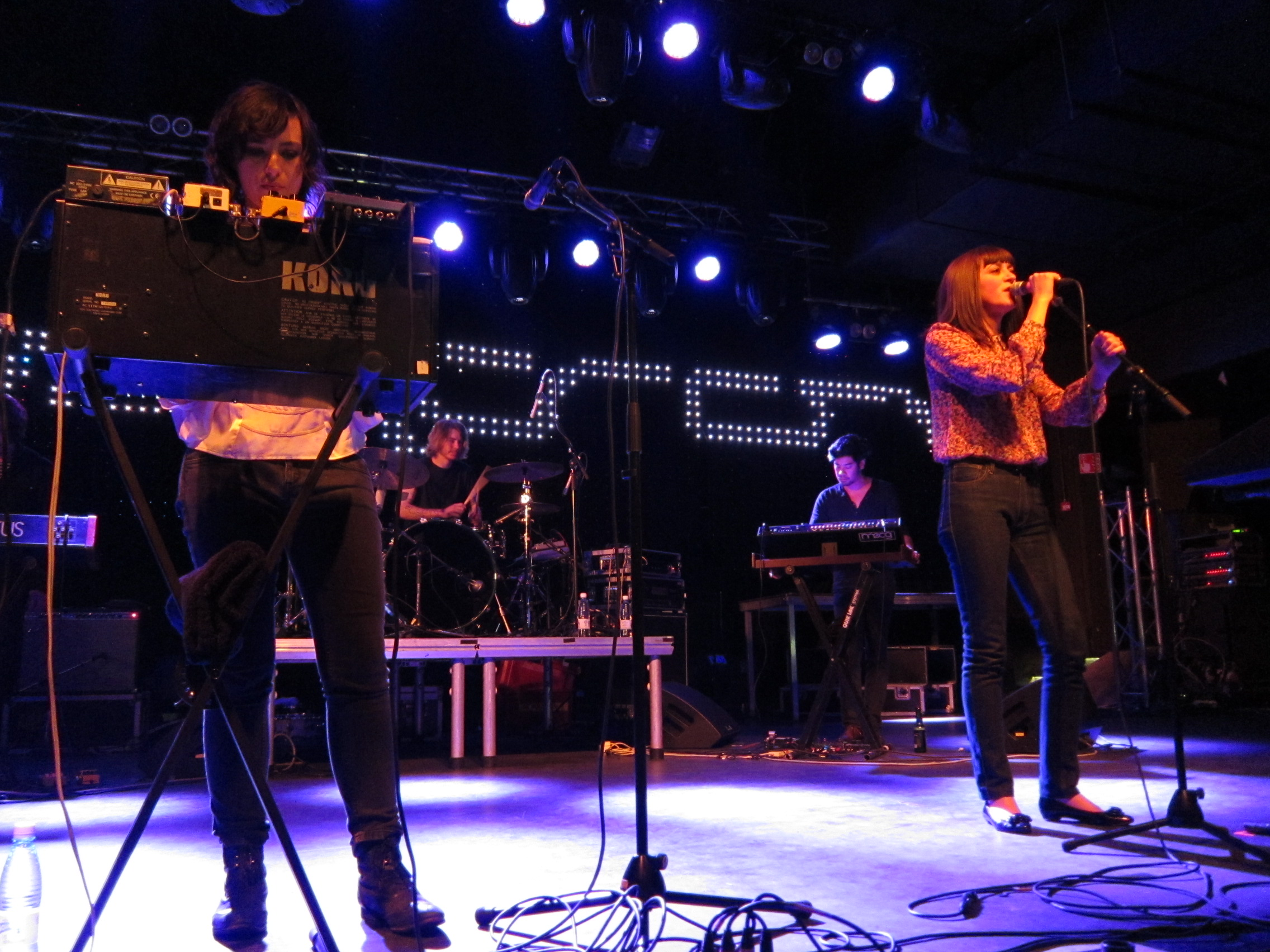
Ladytron – Live at The Circus, Helsinki, 14 May 2011

Ladytron toured during each one of their major albums: 604 (2001), Light & Magic (2002–2004), Witching Hour (2005–2007), Velocifero (2008–2009), Best of 00–10 (2011), Gravity the Seducer (2011), Ladytron (2019–2020). During the years, they toured in Europe, North America, South America, Asia, and Australia.

The band played at various music festivals like La Route du Rock 2001, Reading Festival 2001, Koneisto 2001, Festival Internacional de Benicàssim 2001 and 2005, Coachella Festival 2003 and 2006, Hultsfred Festival 2003, Arvikafestivalen 2003 and 2006, Lowlands Festival 2003, Dot-to-Dot Festival 2005, Pukkelpop 2005, Exit Festival 2005, Creamfields 2007, Electric Picnic 2007, Bonnaroo Festival 2008, Ruisrock Festival 2009, Traffic Festival 2009, Standon Calling Festival 2009, Electrosonic Festival 2009, Ping Gu Valley Festival 2011, Donaufestival 2011, Selector Festival 2011, Hegyalja Festival 2011, Decibel Festival 2011, DeLuna Fest 2011, Zouk Festival 2011, Wave-Gotik Treffen 2024.

Since Light & Magic, Ladytron started to tour extensively and to add touring members to play live bass and drums. Previous touring members include Pop Levi (bass during Light & Magic tour), Andrea Goldsworthy (bass during Witching Hour tour), and Keith York (drums during Light & Magic and Witching Hour tours).

Bands to open for Ladytron on their tours include Simian, The Presets, Client, Phaser, CSS, Asobi Seksu, Mount Sims, Crocodiles, Franz Ferdinand, SONOIO, VHS or Beta and Geographer.

Ladytron have opened for other artists like Soulwax on their UK tour in 2001, Björk in 2003, and Goldfrapp in 2006. In early 2007, they opened for Nine Inch Nails on their European tour, at the invitation of Trent Reznor. In 2009, Ladytron and The Faint co-headlined a North American tour.

During the early part of the Witching Hour tour, the band used to name their four Korg MS-2000B synths to easily differentiate them: Cleopatra (Marnie), Babylon (Aroyo), Ulysses (Hunt), and Gloria (Wu). A staple of all Ladytron shows is Korg MS-20 played by Mira Aroyo.

== Band members ==
Current members

- Helen Marnie – lead vocals, synthesizer (1999–present)
- Mira Aroyo – synthesizer, backing and occasional lead vocals (1999–present)
- Daniel Hunt – synthesizer, guitar, bass, occasional backing vocals (1999–present)

Current touring musicians

- Peter Kelly – drums (2018–present)
- Andrew Hunt – synthesizer, percussion, saxophone (2025–present)

Former members

- Reuben Wu – synthesizer (1999–2023)

Former touring musicians

- Pop Levi – bass, backing vocals (2002–2004)
- Keith York – drums (2003–2006)
- Andrea Goldsworthy – bass, backing vocals (2005–2008)

== Discography ==
- 604 (2001)
- Light & Magic (2002)
- Witching Hour (2005)
- Velocifero (2008)
- Gravity the Seducer (2011)
- Ladytron (2019)
- Time's Arrow (2023)
- Paradises (2026)

== Award nominations ==
Classic Pop Reader Awards

Year	Nominee / work	Award	Result
2019	"The Island"	Video of the Year	Nominated

MVPA Awards

Year	Nominee / work	Award	Result
2006	"Destroy Everything You Touch"	Best Directional Debut	Nominated

PLUG Awards

Year	Nominee / work	Award	Result
2006	"Destroy Everything You Touch"	Song of the Year	Nominated

Popjustice Twenty Quid Music Prize

Year	Nominee / work	Award	Result
2003	"Seventeen"	Best British Pop Single	Nominated
2006	"Destroy Everything You Touch"	Best British Pop Single	Nominated

== Media usage ==
List of Ladytron songs featured on various productions
Song	Production	Type	Year
"Ace of Hz"	FIFA 11	game	2010
"Burning Up"	Fringe	TV series	2009
"Burning Up"	The Big Short	film	2015
"Deep Blue"	Loki	TV series	2021
"Destroy Everything You Touch"	2006 FIFA World Cup	game	2006
"Destroy Everything You Touch"	Smiley Face	film	2007
"Destroy Everything You Touch"	One Missed Call	film	2008
"Destroy Everything You Touch"	Mammoth	film	2009
"Destroy Everything You Touch"	The September Issue	film	2009
"Destroy Everything You Touch"	Série noire	TV series	2014
"Destroy Everything You Touch"	Saltburn	film	2023
"Destroy Everything You Touch"	The Boulet Brothers' Dragula S05E20	TV series	2024
"Discotraxx"	Balls of Steel	TV series	2005
"Discotraxx"	Plague Town	film	2008
"Fighting in Built Up Areas"	Need For Speed: Carbon	game	2006
"Ghosts"	Need For Speed: Undercover	game	2008
"Ghosts"	The Sims 2: Apartment Life	game	2008
"Ghosts"	The Sims 3	game	2009
"Ghosts"	Kings S01E04	TV series	2009
"Ghosts"	LittleBigPlanet 2	game	2011
"International Dateline"	Mammoth	film	2009
"Mu-Tron"	August	film	2008
"Playgirl"	Picture Claire	film	2001
"Playgirl"	The L Word	TV series	2005
"Rockfalls & Estuaries"	The Sims 3	game	2009
"Runaway"	FIFA 09	game	2009
"Seventeen"	Party Monster	film	2003
"Seventeen"	Inspire	ad	2008
"She Stepped Out of the Car"	The Sims 3	game	2009
"Sugar" (Jagz Kooner Remix)	Need For Speed: Carbon	game	2006
"Tesla"	The Sims 3: Supernatural	game	2012
"This Is Our Sound"	Queer as Folk	TV series	2002
"Use Your Mind"	Yo Gabba Gabba! S02E33	TV series	2011
"Versus"	Mammoth	film	2009
"Young Etruscians"	The Sims 3	game	2009

== See also ==
- List of synthpop artists
