= Gravity the Seducer =

2011 studio album by Ladytron

Studio album by Ladytron
- Released: 12 September 2011
- Studio: Bluebell (Kent, England)
- Genre: Synth-pop; baroque pop
- Length: 47:47
- Label: Nettwerk
- Producer: Ladytron; Daniel Hunt; Barny Barnicot; Alessandro Cortini

Ladytron chronology
Best of 00–10 (2011)	Gravity the Seducer (2011)	Ladytron (2019)

Singles from Gravity the Seducer
- 1. "White Elephant" Released: 17 May 2011; 2. "Ambulances" Released: 21 June 2011; 3. "Mirage" Released: 9 August 2011

Gravity the Seducer is the fifth studio album by British electronic music band Ladytron, released on 12 September 2011 by Nettwerk. Recorded in Kent, England, the album has been described as "haunted, evocative, romantic", and having "a feminine warmth".

Three singles have been released from the album, "White Elephant", "Ambulances" and "Mirage". The song "Ace of Hz" had previously been released as a single from the greatest hits album Best of 00–10 before appearing on Gravity the Seducer. Release of the album coincided with a tour across Canada and the United States.

Gravity the Seducer earned generally positive reviews and reached number 72 on the UK Albums Chart.

== Production ==
"It isn't like our other albums. It sounds warm, lush, full of strings, organs and bells. It won't please everyone, you never can, but we're all pretty happy with it."

— Marnie on the album's sound.

Gravity the Seducer was Ladytron's second studio album released under the Nettwerk record label, with whom they signed in 2007. Their first release through Nettwerk was the 2008 studio album Velocifero, followed in March 2011 by the greatest hits album Best of 00–10. Ladytron also self-released the live album, Live at London Astoria 16.07.08 in 2009.

Gravity the Seducer was recorded in Kent, England, and was co-produced by Barny Barnicott, who had previously collaborated with Arctic Monkeys and Editors. as well as having worked on Ladytron's 2005 album Witching Hour. The band felt that the production of the album was different from that of Velocifero, with band member Daniel Hunt noting that the latter record had been "made with performance in mind", as the band had recently finished touring when it was produced. Gravity the Seducer was produced "while removed from that thinking".

In an interview with Rolling Stone magazine, singer Helen Marnie described the album as "the warmest, most emotional, thing we've ever done". The vocal parts on the album have been mixed at a lower volume than previous Ladytron albums, while four tracks are entirely instrumental. The title Gravity the Seducer is taken from a line in the song "Ninety Degrees", which Hunt has described as "expanding our creative horizons". The cover artwork, designed by Neil Krug, has been described as an "endless vista" thematically linked the music's "vast atmospheres", and has been compared to the works of design group Hipgnosis.

== Release and promotion ==
Gravity the Seducer was released on 12 September 2011 in the United Kingdom, and the following day in the United States. In support of the album, Ladytron toured Europe, North America, Brazil, Chile, Thailand, Indonesia and Singapore throughout 2011.

=== Singles ===
"Ace of Hz", the fourth song from Gravity the Seducer, also appeared on band's greatest hits compilation Best of 00–10 and on their Ace of Hz EP. "Ace of Hz" had been released as a single on 30 November 2010. The song was also included in the video game FIFA 11. "White Elephant" was officially released as the lead single from Gravity the Seducer on 17 May 2011.

For further promotion, the songs "Ambulances" and "Mirage" were released as digital downloads on 21 June and 9 August, respectively. The video for "Mirage" was filmed at the Callanish Stones, a five-thousand-year-old stone circle near the Scottish village of Callanish. The video was co-directed by Michael Sherrington and Daniel Hunt.

== Critical reception ==
Professional ratings
Aggregate scores
Source	Rating
Metacritic	68/100
Review scores
Source	Rating
AllMusic	3.5/5 stars
The A.V. Club	B−
Clash	9/10
Drowned in Sound	5/10
The Guardian	3/5 stars
NME	7/10
Pitchfork	6.0/10
PopMatters	7/10
Slant Magazine	3/5 stars
Spin	6/10

Gravity the Seducer received generally positive reviews from critics. At Metacritic, which assigns a normalised rating out of 100 to reviews from mainstream publications, the album received an average score of 68, based on 20 reviews. The Independent's Simon Price praised the album as "faultless", noting that it represented the band "at their most electronically pure". Chris Todd of Clash magazine lauded Gravity the Seducer as "an album of lush and elegant pop music, beguiling and gloriously cinematic." Slant Magazine's Eric Henderson described the album as "uniformly sleek [and] polished like a summer skyline" and praised singer Helen Marnie's "lightly lilting" vocals, but felt that the similarity between certain songs left the album feeling "almost barren". Heather Phares of AllMusic described the album as "an admirable artistic choice, even though it doesn't always pay off".

The A.V. Club's Christopher Bahn called the album "heart-on-sleeve and icily detached at the same time"; however, Bahn opined that "the lack of a propulsive single ... as well as an overabundance of instrumentals, suggests a band that's spinning its wheels". Jamie Crossan of NME found the album to be "nothing new", but felt that the album's content is more of what "the band have always excelled" at. Larry Fitzmaurice of Pitchfork dubbed the album "upsettingly uneven", adding that it represented a transition away from the sound of band's earlier work, which he felt was still evident in "Ace of Hz" and "Mirage", towards a "floatier, airy feel". Michael Hann of The Guardian expressed that Gravity the Seducer did not measure up to the band's earlier work, picking out their earlier single "Destroy Everything You Touch" as a yardstick "that subsequent work will always be judged against". Spin magazine's Barry Walters remarked that the album "lacks the infectious, dark-disco rumble" of Ladytron's earlier work, noting that it "withhold[s] the hooks that previously put the sweet in their bitter". John Calvert of Drowned in Sound characterised the album as "slightly bland" and "nondescript in its understated sophistication", concluding that "Gravity the Seducer never manages to get under your skin the way the band intended".

== Commercial performance ==
In the band's home country, the United Kingdom, Gravity the Seducer peaked at number 72 on the UK Albums Chart, spending one week on the chart. It became the band's highest-peaking album on the chart to date.

The album's highest chart position was on the United States' Heatseekers Albums chart, where it peaked at number two. The album reached 112 on the Billboard 200, as well as number 27 on the Billboard Independent Albums chart and number six on the Dance/Electronic Albums chart.

Gravity the Seducer reached number 50 on the Finnish Albums Chart, spending one week on the chart; number 90 in the Canadian Albums Chart; and number four on the Belgian Heatseekers Albums Chart, spending a week on that chart.

== Track listing ==
No.	Title	Writer(s)	Length
1.	"White Elephant"	Daniel Hunt	4:15
2.	"Mirage"	Hunt	4:21
3.	"White Gold"	Helen Marnie; Reuben Wu	5:00
4.	"Ace of Hz"	Hunt	3:36
5.	"Ritual"	Hunt	4:17
6.	"Moon Palace"	Mira Aroyo	3:26
7.	"Altitude Blues"	Aroyo; Marnie; Wu	3:19
8.	"Ambulances"	Marnie	3:16
9.	"Melting Ice"	Aroyo	4:48
10.	"Transparent Days"	Hunt	4:01
11.	"Ninety Degrees"	Hunt	4:34
12.	"Aces High"	Hunt	2:54
Total length:			47:47

== Gravity the Seducer (Remixed) ==
On 29 November 2013, Ladytron released the remix album Gravity the Seducer (Remixed), a collection of remixes of Gravity the Seducer songs. They also released an exclusive limited-edition blue vinyl of this remix album on Record Store Day special Black Friday.

No.	Title	Remixer(s)	Length
1.	"White Elephant"	Strange Fruit	3:43
2.	"Mirage"	Mixhell	4:49
3.	"White Gold"	Tarsius	6:15
4.	"Ace of Hz"	Punks Jump Up	4:53
5.	"Ritual"	Reset!	4:32
6.	"Moon Palace"	ARIISK	3:23
7.	"Altitude Blues"	Outfit	4:51
8.	"Ambulances"	Gosteffects	4:18
9.	"Melting Ice"	The Chaotic Good	5:41
10.	"Transparent Days"	SONOIO	4:20
11.	"Ninety Degrees"	Somekong	6:17
12.	"Aces High"	Ladytron	3:12
Total length:			56:14

== Personnel ==
Credits adapted from the liner notes of Gravity the Seducer.

- Ladytron – production
- Daniel Hunt – production
- Barny Barnicott – additional production, engineering, mixing
- Alessandro Cortini – additional production
- Neil Krug – artwork
- Trevor Tarczynski – design

== Charts ==
Chart performance for Gravity the Seducer
Chart (2011)	Peak position
Belgian Heatseekers Albums (Ultratop Flanders)	4
Canadian Albums (Billboard)	90
Finnish Albums (Suomen virallinen lista)	50
UK Albums (OCC)	72
UK Independent Albums (OCC)	11
US Billboard 200	112
US Heatseekers Albums (Billboard)	2
US Independent Albums (Billboard)	27
US Top Dance Albums (Billboard)	6
