= Best of 00–10 =

2011 greatest hits album by Ladytron

Greatest hits album by Ladytron
- Released: 28 March 2011
- Recorded: 1997–2010
- Genres: Electropop; synth-pop
- Length: 68:52
- Label: Nettwerk
- Producers: Jim Abbiss; Vicarious Bliss; Alessandro Cortini; Daniel Hunt; Ladytron; Mickey Petralia; Lance Thomas

Ladytron chronology
Live at London Astoria 16.07.08 (2009)	Best of 00–10 (2011)	Gravity the Seducer (2011)

Singles from Best of 00–10
- 1. "Ace of Hz" Released: 30 November 2010

Professional ratings
Aggregate scores
Source	Rating
Metacritic	78/100
Review scores
Source	Rating
AllMusic	4/5 stars
BBC Music	Favourable
ChartAttack	4/5
Clash	5/10
Drowned in Sound	9/10
The Independent	Favourable
musicOMH	4/5 stars
The New Zealand Herald	3.5/5
Pitchfork	8.2/10
PopMatters	8/10

Best of 00–10 is a greatest hits album by English electronic music band Ladytron, released on 28 March 2011 by Nettwerk. The compilation includes remastered material spanning from the band's previous studio albums, as well as two previously unreleased tracks—lead single "Ace of Hz" and a cover version of Death in June's 1992 song "Little Black Angel". A deluxe version was also released, featuring a bonus disc of 16 additional tracks and an 80-page photo booklet.

The track "Blue Jeans" is actually "Blue Jeans 2.0" from the album Light & Magic (Remixed & Rare).

The track "Evil" is an edit of the track as found on Light & Magic, which is over 5 1/2 minutes.

The track "USA vs White Noise" is not the version found on Light & Magic. It may be a previously unreleased version.

== Track listing ==
All tracks are written by Ladytron, except where noted.

No.	Title	Length
1.	"Destroy Everything You Touch"	4:38
2.	"International Dateline"	4:18
3.	"Seventeen"	4:39
4.	"Discotraxx"	3:51
5.	"Tomorrow"	3:37
6.	"Soft Power"	5:20
7.	"Ghosts" (Single Edit)	4:30
8.	"Fighting in Built Up Areas"	4:01
9.	"Playgirl"	3:51
10.	"Blue Jeans"	3:46
11.	"Cracked LCD"	2:33
12.	"Deep Blue"	5:04
13.	"Light & Magic"	3:36
14.	"Runaway"	4:50
15.	"The Last One Standing"	3:13
16.	"Little Black Angel" (Douglas P.)	3:32
17.	"Ace of Hz"	3:33

Deluxe edition bonus disc
No.	Title	Length
1.	"The Reason Why"	4:16
2.	"Whitelightgenerator"	4:01
3.	"Mu-Tron"	3:00
4.	"Black Plastic"	4:19
5.	"The Way That I Found You"	3:31
6.	"True Mathematics"	2:24
7.	"High Rise"	4:54
8.	"Black Cat"	5:10
9.	"Another Breakfast with You"	3:04
10.	"USA vs. White Noise"	3:52
11.	"Commodore Rock"	4:48
12.	"Evil"	4:07
13.	"Beauty*2"	4:25
14.	"Season of Illusions"	4:01
15.	"Versus"	5:45
16.	"All the Way..."	4:07

=== Best of Remixes ===
On 8 March 2011, a preceding companion compilation titled Best of Remixes was released digitally.

No.	Title	Remixer(s)	Length
1.	"Seventeen"	Soulwax	4:28
2.	"Destroy Everything You Touch" (Involv2er Remix)	Sasha	8:23
3.	"Ace of Hz"	Tiësto	7:26
4.	"Runaway" (Red Eye Remix)	James Zabiela	8:59
5.	"Ghosts"	Toxic Avenger	3:37
6.	"Playgirl" (Glitz Club Mix)	Felix da Housecat	6:37
7.	"He Took Her to a Movie"	Bertrand Burgalat	3:46
8.	"Evil" (Single Remix)	Ewan Pearson	4:11
9.	"Blue Jeans"	Josh Wink	6:04
10.	"Soft Power" (Gutter Remix)	Vicarious Bliss	6:47
11.	"International Dateline"	Simian Mobile Disco	5:19
12.	"Beauty*2"	Frozen Smoke	4:50
13.	"Weekend"	James Iha	4:00
14.	"Seventeen"	Justin Robertson	7:05
15.	"Destroy Everything You Touch"	Hot Chip	6:51
16.	"Last One Standing"	Shipps & Tait	3:46
17.	"Tomorrow"	Apparat	5:39

== Singles ==
"Ace of Hz", one of the two new tracks to appear on Best of 00–10, was released as a single several months prior on 30 November 2010. It also featured on the soundtrack for FIFA 11. and was later included on the subsequent (non-compilation) studio album, Gravity the Seducer.

On 12 January 2011, remixed versions of the song appeared in a digitally distributed EP released by Nettwerk.

=== "Ace of Hz" single track listing ===
N0010514DIG
No.	Title	Length
1.	"Ace of Hz (Album Version)"	3:35
2.	"Ace of Hz (Punks Jump Up Remix)"	4:55
3.	"Ace of Hz (Tiësto Remix)"	7:26
4.	"Ace of Hz (Tiësto Remix Radio Edit)"	3:36
5.	"Ace of Hz (NYCPARTYINFO Remix)"	6:14
6.	"Ace of Hz (Punks Jump Up Dub Remix)"	4:54
Total length:		30:40

== Charts ==
Chart performance for Best of 00–10
Chart (2011)	Peak position
UK Dance Albums (Official Charts)	28
UK Independent Albums (Official Charts)	28
