= Korg MS-10 =

Musical synthesizer

MS-10
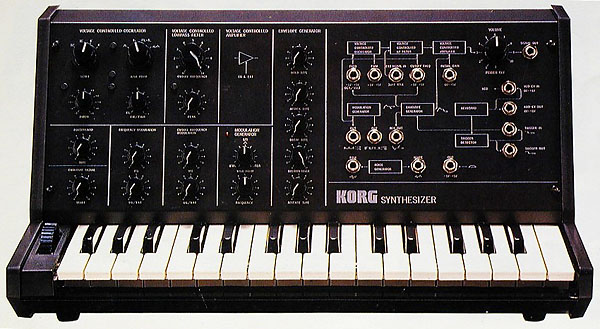
- Korg MS-10
- Manufacturer: Korg
- Dates: 1978–1981
- Price: US$450

Technical specifications
- Polyphony: Monophonic
- Timbrality: Monotimbral
- Oscillator: 1 VCO per voice Triangle, Sawtooth, Pulse width, White noise
- Synthesis type: Analog subtractive
- Filter: 1 low-pass
- Aftertouch expression: no
- Velocity expression: no
- Storage memory: none
- Effects: none

Input/output
- Keyboard: 32 keys
- External control: CV/Gate

The Korg MS-10 is an analogue synthesizer created by Korg in 1978. Unlike its bigger brother, the Korg MS-20, the MS-10 only has one VCO, one VCF and one envelope generator. It is monophonic and has 32 keys.

The MS-10 is well known for its huge sounding electro bass sounds.

== Sound and features ==
The MS-10 synthesizer features a single voltage-controlled oscillator (VCO) offering four waveforms: triangle, sawtooth, pulse, and white noise, and incorporates the same 12dB/octave low-pass filter found in the original MS-20.

It is equipped with one low-frequency oscillator (LFO), known as the "modulation generator," which has two controls for rate and shape, and two outputs: pulse and sloped. The shape control adjusts the pulse width and the contour of the sloped output, with the midpoint setting yielding a 50% pulse width and a triangle wave shape. The LFO's influence on the VCO frequency and filter cutoff is adjustable via dedicated knobs on the control panel. Additionally, the MS-10 features a single envelope generator, complete with controls for Hold, Attack, Decay, Sustain, and Release.

Although the MS-10 has normalized connections, they can be modified with patch cables. This allows the LFO to modulate the pulse width of the VCO or the amplitude of the VCA. It also has a noise generator with white and pink noise outputs, CV in and out, and an external signal input, not to be confused with the "External Signal Processor" of the MS-20.
