= Strange Words and Weird Wars =

2017 album by Marnie

Studio album by Marnie
- Released: 2 June 2017
- Studio: Chem19 (Glasgow)
- Genre: Synth-pop; avant-pop
- Length: 39:22
- Label: Disco Pinata
- Producer: Jonny Scott

Marnie chronology
Crystal World (2013)	Strange Words and Weird Wars (2017)

Singles from Strange Words and Weird Wars
- 1. "Alphabet Block" Released: 24 January 2017; 2. "Lost Maps" Released: 30 March 2017; 3. "Electric Youth" Released: 18 May 2017

Strange Words and Weird Wars is the second studio album by Scottish musician Marnie, released on 2 June 2017 through Disco Pinata. It is Marnie's second album released during the hiatus of her main band Ladytron, the first being Crystal World (2013).

== Release ==
Professional ratings
Review scores
Source	Rating
The Skinny	4/5 stars

Strange Words and Weird Wars is the second solo album of the Scottish musician Marnie (full name Helen Marnie), the lead vocalist and one of the songwriters and keyboardists of the electronic band Ladytron. The album was released on 2 June 2017. The first single "Alphabet Block" premiered on 24 January 2017 on PopJustice. "Lost Maps" was chosen as the second single and it was released on 30 March.

== Track listing ==
All tracks are written by Marnie.

No.	Title	Length
1.	"Alphabet Block"	4:22
2.	"Bloom"	2:58
3.	"G.I.R.L.S"	3:57
4.	"Electric Youth"	3:25
5.	"A Girl Walks Home Alone at Night"	4:43
6.	"Lost Maps"	4:14
7.	"Summer Boys"	4:28
8.	"Little Knives"	3:43
9.	"Invisible Girl"	3:18
10.	"Heartbreak Kid"	4:14
Total length:		39:22

== Personnel ==
- Helen Marnie – vocals, synthesizers
- Jonny Scott – production
- Lewis Gardiner – mixing
- John Davis at Metropolis – mastering
- Peter Kelly – additional drums, "Boys/girls", "Mind owl" and "Electric" drawings
- Aleksandra Modrzejewska – photography
- Helen Marnie and Jonny Scott – additional in-studio photography
