= Velocifero =

2008 album by Ladytron

Studio album by Ladytron
- Released: 19 May 2008
- Recorded: 2007–2008
- Studios: Grande Armée, Paris
- Genres: Electronic rock; synth-pop; shoegaze; art pop; goth-pop
- Length: 54:29
- Languages: English; Bulgarian
- Label: Nettwerk
- Producer: Ladytron

Ladytron chronology
The Harmonium Sessions (2006)	Velocifero (2008)	Live at London Astoria 16.07.08 (2009)

Singles from Velocifero
- 1. "Ghosts" Released: 12 May 2008; 2. "Runaway" Released: 22 September 2008; 3. "Tomorrow" Released: 2 March 2009

Velocifero is the fourth studio album by English electronic music band Ladytron and their first to be released by Nettwerk. The album was first released digitally on 19 May 2008, followed by a physical release on 2 June in the United Kingdom and on 3 June elsewhere.

Velocifero peaked at number 75 on the UK Albums Chart, becoming the band's second highest-charting album to date in the UK (after Gravity the Seducer reached number 72 in 2011). It was also their first album to chart on the US Billboard 200, reaching number 131. Velocifero spawned three singles: "Ghosts", "Runaway" and "Tomorrow".

== Background ==
According to band member Reuben Wu, "velocifero" literally means "bringer of speed", and is also the name of a classic retro-styled scooter. "Black Cat" and "Kletva" are both sung entirely in Bulgarian. "Kletva" (which means "oath") is a cover of a song from a solo album by Kiril Marichkov of Bulgarian rock band Shturtzite. Daniel Hunt provided additional vocals on "Versus".

== Singles ==
"Ghosts" was released as the album's lead single on 12 May 2008. It reached number 106 on the UK singles chart. The song was included on the soundtrack to the video games Need for Speed: Undercover, The Sims 2: Apartment Life (Apartment Life featured the song as an instrumental version; both in 2008) The Sims 3 (2009) and LittleBigPlanet 2 (2011), as well as on the soundtrack to the 2009 slasher film Sorority Row. The track was also used in the TV advert for the 2010 Jameson Dublin International Film Festival. A remix of "Ghosts" by New York alternative rap collective Blestenation was released as a free download on 22 August 2008 by RCRD LBL.

== Critical reception ==
Professional ratings
Aggregate scores
Source	Rating
Metacritic	73/100
Review scores
Source	Rating
AllMusic	3.5/5 stars
The A.V. Club	B+
BBC Music	Favourable
Drowned in Sound	7/10
The Guardian	3/5 stars
Lost at Sea	8.5/10
Pitchfork	7.2/10
PopMatters	8/10
Spin	2.5/5 stars
The Times	4/5 stars

Velocifero received generally positive reviews from music critics. At Metacritic, which assigns a normalised rating out of 100 to reviews from mainstream publications, the album received an average score of 73, based on 26 reviews.

== Track listing ==
All tracks are written by Mira Aroyo, Daniel Hunt, Helen Marnie and Reuben Wu, except where noted.

No.	Title	Length
1.	"Black Cat" (writers: Aroyo, Wu)	5:09
2.	"Ghosts"	4:43
3.	"I'm Not Scared"	3:58
4.	"Runaway"	4:50
5.	"Season of Illusions"	4:02
6.	"Burning Up" (writers: Hunt, Wu)	4:08
7.	"Kletva" (writer: Kiril Marichkov)	2:43
8.	"They Gave You a Heart, They Gave You a Name"	3:29
9.	"Predict the Day" (writer: Marnie)	4:25
10.	"The Lovers"	2:39
11.	"Deep Blue"	5:03
12.	"Tomorrow"	3:36
13.	"Versus"	5:44

Japanese edition bonus tracks
No.	Title	Length
17.	"Ghosts" (Candie Hank Mix)	5:06
18.	"Ghosts" (Modwheelmood Mix) (iTunes Store only)	4:29

== Velocifero (Remixed & Rare) ==
On 6 April 2010, Nettwerk released a compilation of remixes, B-sides and rarities titled Velocifero (Remixed & Rare). The cover is the based on the black and white stripes artwork of the single "Runaway".

No.	Title	Remixer(s)	Length
1.	"Ghosts"	Toxic Avenger	3:37
2.	"Tomorrow"	Apparat	5:39
3.	"Runaway" (Red Eye Remix)	James Zabiela	8:59
4.	"Predict the Day"	Grey Ghost	6:05
5.	"Runaway"	Adult	5:02
6.	"Tomorrow" (Lucky Remix)	Vector Lovers	6:53
7.	"Ghosts"	Modwheelmood	4:28
8.	"Tomorrow" (Radio Remix)	Jim Abbiss	3:34
9.	"Versus"	Kindle	4:38
10.	"Tomorrow"	port-royal	3:36
11.	"Runaway"	Brendan Long	5:17
12.	"Tomorrow" (Club Remix)	Dirty Vegas	9:22
13.	"Runaway"	Ashtar Command	4:40

== Personnel ==
Credits adapted from the liner notes of Velocifero.

=== Musicians ===
- Daniel Hunt – additional vocals (uncredited) (track 13)
- Semay Wu – cello
- Slic – drums
- Somekong (Peter Salmang and Javier Benitez) – additional musicians

=== Technical ===
- Ladytron – production
- Michael Patterson – mixing
- Vicarious Bliss – additional production
- Alessandro Cortini – additional production
- Erwan "Eq" Quinio – engineering
- Daniel Woodward – engineering
- Alex Hasson – engineering assistance

=== Artwork ===
- Stéphane Gallois – photography
- Assume Vivid Astro Focus – design
- Pipa – design

== Charts ==
Chart (2008)	Peak position
Australian Hitseekers Albums (ARIA)	9
Scottish Albums (Official Charts)	75
UK Albums (Official Charts)	75
UK Independent Albums (Official Charts)	6
US Billboard 200	131
US Top Dance Albums (Billboard)	3

== Release history ==
Region	Date	Format	Label	Ref.
Sweden	19 May 2008	Digital download	Playground Music Scandinavia	
Italy	19 May 2008	Digital download	Nettwerk	
United Kingdom	19 May 2008	Digital download	Nettwerk	
Australia	20 May 2008	Digital download	Shock	
Sweden	28 May 2008	CD	Playground Music Scandinavia	
Germany	30 May 2008	CD; LP; digital download	Major	
Australia	2 June 2008	CD	Shock	
United Kingdom	2 June 2008	CD	Nettwerk	
United States	3 June 2008	CD; LP	Nettwerk	
Italy	4 June 2008	CD	Nettwerk	
Japan	4 June 2008	CD; digital download	Sideout	
United States	28 September 2010	Digital download	Nettwerk	

Velocifero (Remixed & Rare)
Region	Date	Format	Label	Ref.
United Kingdom	6 April 2010	Digital download	Nettwerk	
Australia	21 May 2010	CD; digital download	Shock	
Germany	21 May 2010	Digital download	Major	
United States	1 June 2010	CD	Nettwerk	
United Kingdom	1 June 2010	CD	Nettwerk	
United States	28 September 2010	Digital download	Nettwerk	
