= The Harmonium Sessions =

2006 EP by Ladytron

EP by Ladytron
- Released: 2006
- Genre: Acoustic
- Length: 15:32
- Label: Self-released

Ladytron chronology
Extended Play (2006)	The Harmonium Sessions (2006)	Velocifero (2008)

The Harmonium Sessions is the fifth extended play (EP) by English electronic music band Ladytron. It contains unplugged versions of four songs from their 2005 studio album, Witching Hour.

It was self-released by the band as a limited edition of 500 copies. The EP comes in cardboard sleeve. On 29 March 2011, The Harmonium Sessions was released digitally by Nettwerk.

== Track listing ==
All songs written by Ladytron.

1. "International Dateline" – 4:23
2. "Sugar" – 3:06
3. "Destroy Everything You Touch" – 4:46
4. "The Last One Standing" – 3:17
