= Korg MS-20 =

Patchable semi-modular monophonic analog synthesizer

MS-20
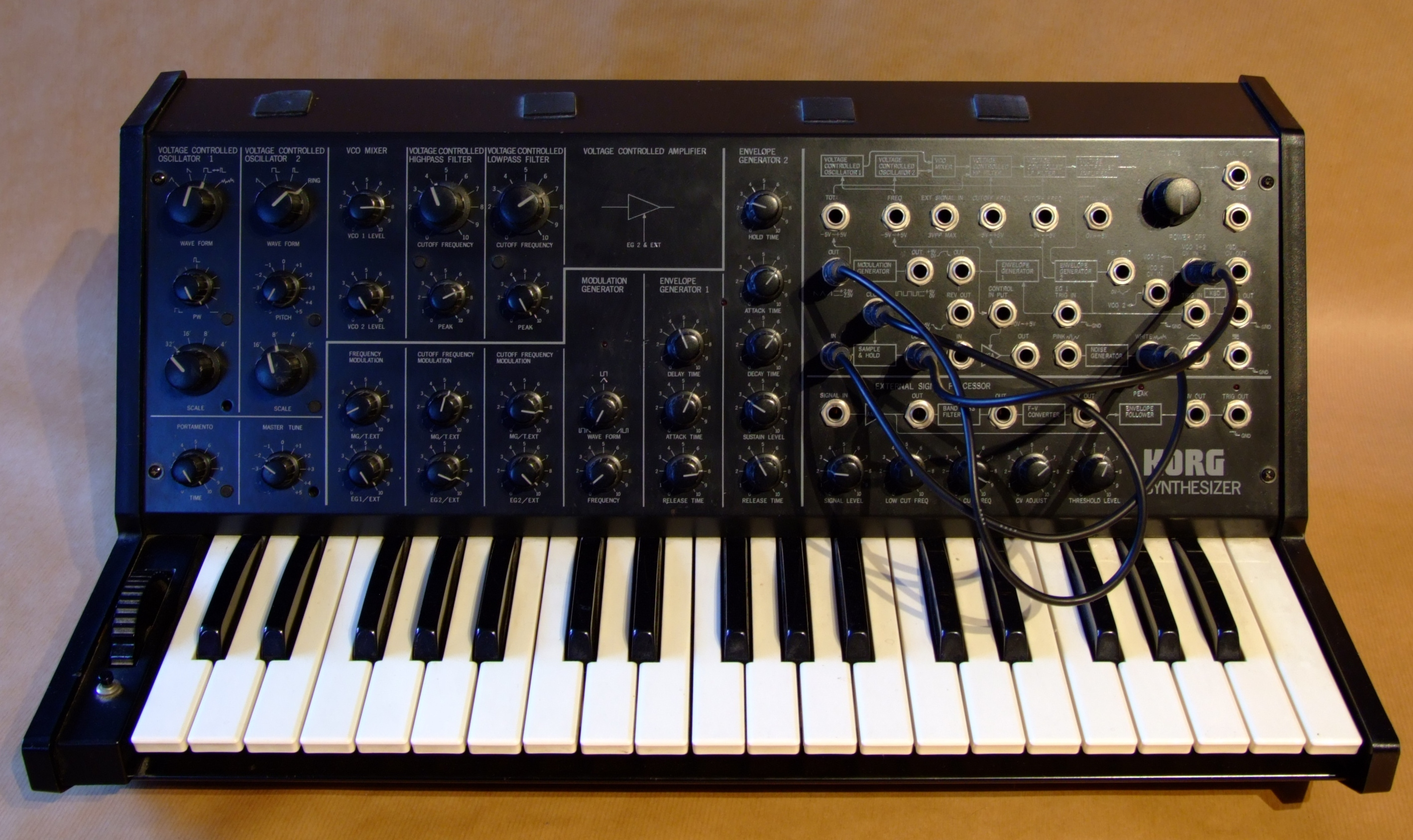
- Korg MS-20
- Manufacturer: Korg
- Dates: 1978–1983; Mini: 2013-present Kit: 2015; FS: 2021
- Price: US$750; Mini: $600; Kit: $1399; FS: $1399

Technical specifications
- Polyphony: Monophonic
- Timbrality: Monotimbral
- Oscillator: 2 VCOs per voice
- LFO: 1
- Synthesis type: Analog subtractive
- Filter: 2 high-pass/low-pass
- Attenuator: 2 VCA; 2 envelopes
- Aftertouch expression: no
- Velocity expression: no
- Storage memory: none
- Effects: none

Input/output
- Keyboard: 37 keys
- External control: CV/Gate (all versions); MIDI (Mini, Kit and FS)

The Korg MS-20 is a patchable semi-modular monophonic analog synthesizer which Korg released in 1978 and which was in production until 1983. It was part of Korg's MS series of instruments, which also included the single oscillator MS-10, the keyboardless MS-50 module, the SQ-10 sequencer, and the VC-10 Vocoder. Additional devices included the MS-01 Foot Controller, MS-02 Interface, MS-03 Signal Processor, and MS-04 Modulation Pedal.

Although the MS-20 follows a conventional subtractive synthesis architecture with oscillators, filter, and VCA, its patch panel allows some rerouting of both audio and modulation signals, alongside an external signal processor. This flexibility led to its resurgence during the analog revival of the late 1990s.

In response to a revived interest in monophonic analog synthesizers, Korg has reintroduced the MS-20 in various formats: the scaled-down MS-20 Mini, unassembled desktop and full-sized versions, and, in 2020, a full-sized reissue known as the MS-20 FS.

== Sound and features ==
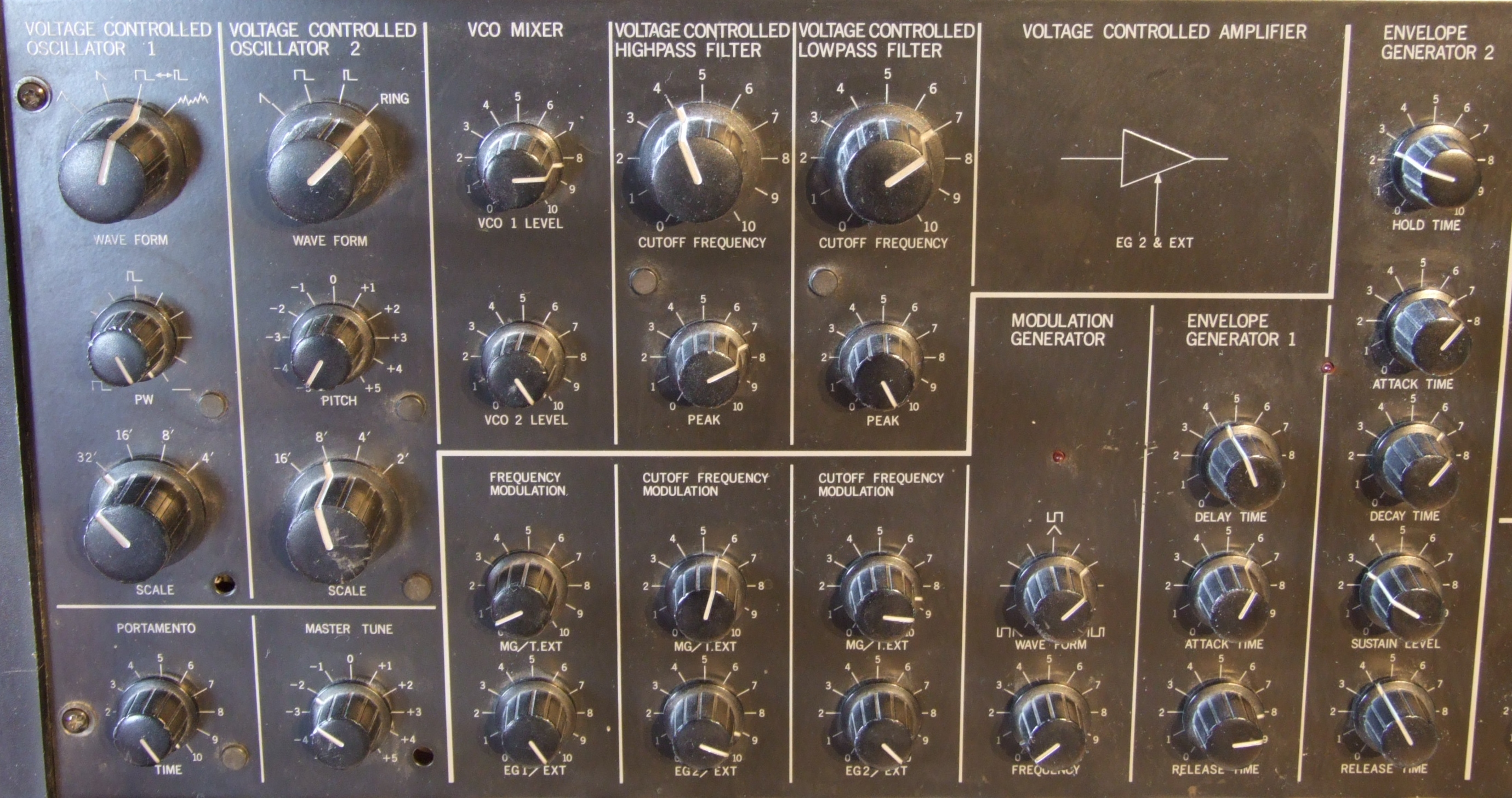
MS-20 knob section

The MS-20 features two voltage-controlled oscillators (VCOs) with a variety of waveform outputs including triangle, sawtooth, pulse, and white noise for VCO1, and sawtooth, square, and narrow pulse waveforms, as well as a ring modulation option for VCO2. The MS-20 also boasts two voltage-controlled filters (VCFs) in series—a high-pass and a low-pass filter.

The MS-20 has a low frequency oscillator, labeled "modulation generator", which offers unique controls over the rate and shape of the waveform, which is sent to two outputs: pulse and sloped. This allows for a wide range of modulation effects, from changing the duty cycle of the pulse output to varying the shape of the sloped output, making it possible to achieve everything from sawtooth to square and triangle waves.

The synthesizer includes two envelope generators with various parameters, providing control over the dynamics and articulation of the sound. Additionally, the MS-20 features a noise source, a modulation VCA, and options for external control through a frequency-voltage converter and an envelope follower, enabling the synthesizer to be driven by external signals such as a voice or another instrument. Its patch panel allows for extensive connectivity and modulation routing, further expanding its creative possibilities.

== MS-20 reissues ==
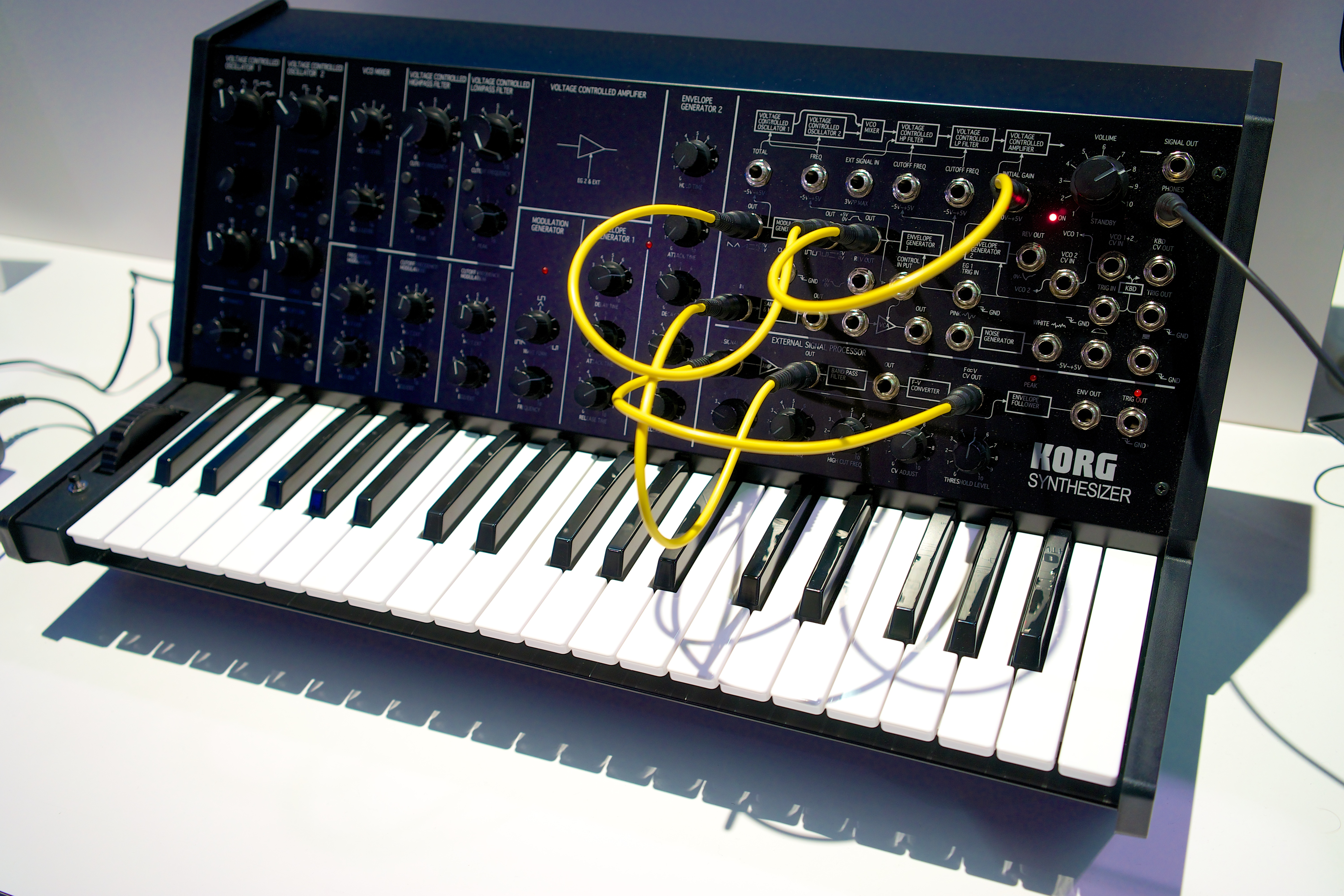
The fully built MS-20 Kit – the limited edition kit version of the MS-20 Mini.

At the 2013 NAMM Show, Korg announced the MS-20 Mini, a compact version of the iconic Korg MS-20, scaled down to 86% of the original's size. The MS-20 Mini was developed by the same engineers responsible for the original instrument, ensuring a faithful replication of the MS-20's original electronic circuits. The modernized version introduces 1/8-inch input and output jacks, a MIDI input jack, and USB MIDI connectivity for both input and output.

The following year, at the 2014 NAMM Show, Korg announced that it would release a limited edition full-size unassembled MS-20. Like the MS-20 Mini, this kit adds MIDI and USB connectivity. Additionally, the MS-20 Kit includes two different filter types: one used in earlier MS20s or a slightly warmer filter used on later MS20s.

At the 2015 NAMM Show, Korg unveiled the MS-20M Kit, an unassembled desktop module version of the MS-20, excluding a keyboard and sold with the Korg SQ-1 step sequencer. This version incorporates self-oscillating high-pass/low-pass filters with distinctive distortion, toggle switches for VCO synchronization and FM, and a choice between the original filter designs. It also features a PWM IN jack for pulse width modulation, compatibility with various CV/GATE standards (Hz/V and V/Oct, S-Trig, and V-Trig), a MIDI IN connector, USB MIDI connectivity, and a junction patch bay for SQ-1 integration.

In 2019, Behringer announced its low-cost clone of the MS-20, the K-2.

At the 2020 NAMM Show, Korg announced a full size reissue of the MS-20, called the MS-20 FS, which retains features from the 2013 kit release such as the Rev1 and Rev2 filter types as well as MIDI compatibility through both 5-pin DIN and USB connections.

== Software emulations ==
There is a software emulator of the MS-20 included in the KORG legacy Collection. As well as a standalone emulator, the Legacy Collection provides the MS-20 as a virtual instrument (VST). The external signal processor is implemented separately as a VST effect called MS-20EX. This same software emulated MS-20 was also part of the LAC-1 expansion for the Korg OASYS and is one of the Korg Kronos sound engines.

KORG DS-10 is a music creation program for the Nintendo DS that emulates the Korg MS range of synthesizers.

KORG DSN-12 is an MS-20 emulator for the Nintendo 3DS.

KORG iMS-20 is an MS-20 emulator for the iPad.
