= Time's Arrow (album) =

Studio album by Ladytron
- Released: 20 January 2023
- Recorded: March 2020 – December 2021
- Studio: Castle of Doom (Glasgow); Pipistrelle (Glasgow); Whitewood (Liverpool); Total Refreshment Centre (London); Post Electric (Edinburgh)
- Genre: Synth-pop; dream pop
- Length: 41:16
- Label: Cooking Vinyl
- Producer: Daniel Hunt; Helen Marnie; Mira Aroyo; Jonny Scott; Vice Cooler

Ladytron chronology
| Ladytron (2019) | Time's Arrow (2023) | Paradises (2026) |

Singles from Time's Arrow
- 1. "City of Angels" Released: 14 October 2022; 2. "Misery Remember Me" Released: 11 November 2022; 3. "Faces" Released: 5 December 2022

Time's Arrow is the seventh studio album by English electronic band Ladytron, released on 20 January 2023 through Cooking Vinyl.

== Singles ==
Time's Arrow was supported by three singles. The first single, "City of Angels" was released on 14 October 2022. It was accompanied by a music video directed by Manuel Nogueira that was released on 26 October. "Misery Remember Me" was the second single and was released on 11 November 2022. The third single, "Faces" was released on 5 December 2022, and accompanied by a music video released on 17 January 2023.

== Critical reception ==
Metacritic, which uses a weighted average, assigned the album a score of 78 out of 100, based on 12 critics, indicating "generally favorable reviews". The music review website Pitchfork gave Time's Arrow a rating of 6.9 and described it as "capturing the passage of time in effervescent synths and impressionistic lyrics." Thomas Frenken of Electro Zombies gave the album 3.4 stars out of 5 in a 25 January 2023 review.

== Track listing ==
Time's Arrow track listing
| No. | Title | Writer(s) | Length |
|---|---|---|---|
| 1. | "City of Angels" | Daniel Hunt | 4:38 |
| 2. | "Faces" | Hunt; Helen Marnie | 4:40 |
| 3. | "Misery Remember Me" | Marnie; Jonathan Daniel Scott | 4:14 |
| 4. | "Flight from Angkor" | Mira Aroyo; Vice Cooler | 4:07 |
| 5. | "We Never Went Away" | Hunt | 3:57 |
| 6. | "The Night" | Hunt; Marnie; Scott | 4:17 |
| 7. | "The Dreamers" | Hunt; Marnie; Scott | 3:40 |
| 8. | "Sargasso Sea" | Hunt; Marnie | 3:30 |
| 9. | "California" | Marnie; Scott | 4:08 |
| 10. | "Time's Arrow" | Aroyo; Cooler | 4:00 |
| Total length: | | | 41:16 |

== Charts ==
Chart performance for Time's Arrow
| Chart (2023) | Peak position |
|---|---|
| Scottish Albums (OCC) | 6 |
| UK Albums (OCC) | 67 |
| UK Independent Albums (OCC) | 4 |
