= Helen Marnie =

Scottish musician

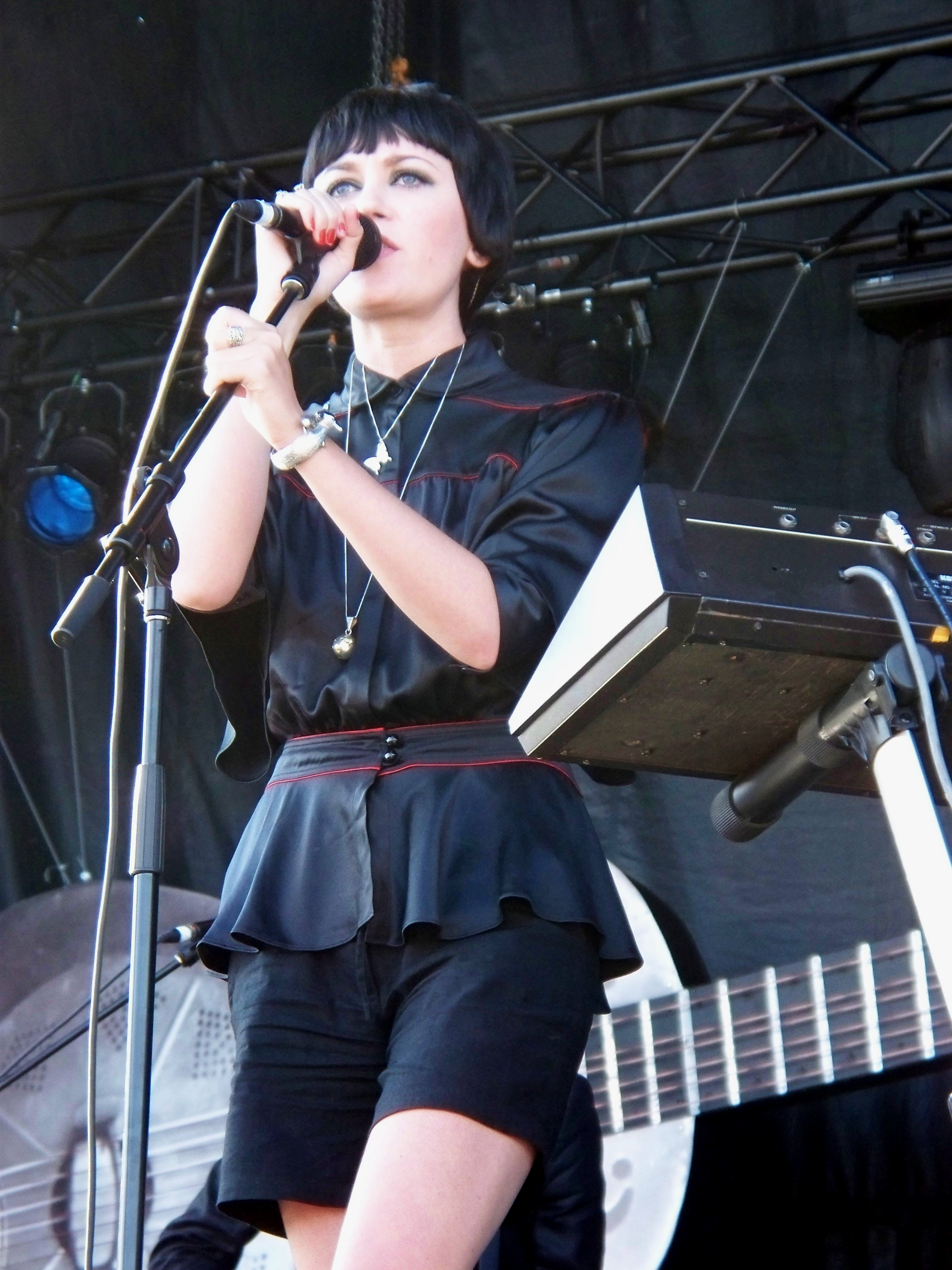
- Helen Marnie at Ottawa Bluesfest in 2008

Background information
- Born: Helen Lindsay Marnie; 21 February 1978 (age 48); Glasgow, Scotland
- Genres: Electronic; synthpop; new wave; dream pop
- Occupation: Musician
- Instruments: Vocals; synthesizers; piano
- Years active: 1999–present
- Labels: Nettwerk; Les Disques Du Crépuscule; Cobraside
- Member of: Ladytron
- Website: www.ladytron.com

Helen Lindsay Marnie (born 21 February 1978) is a Scottish musician, known as the lead vocalist and one of the keyboardists and songwriters of the electronic band Ladytron. In 2012, she started a solo career as Marnie and released her debut solo album Crystal World on 11 June 2013. Her second solo album, Strange Words and Weird Wars, was released on 2 June 2017.

== Biography ==
Helen Marnie was born and raised in Glasgow, Scotland. She is a classically trained pianist. Marnie studied classical piano at the Royal Scottish Academy of Music and Drama in Glasgow. She dropped out of university in Glasgow before going on to study music at the University of Liverpool, England where she received in 1999 a BA in pop music.

In the summer of 1999, English producers and DJs Daniel Hunt and Reuben Wu met students Helen Marnie (through various DJ gigs) and Mira Aroyo (through a mutual friend). Sharing similar interests in music, they formed the electronic band Ladytron in the same year. Since then, Marnie has performed as the lead singer of the band, and also plays synthesizers and contributes to songwriting.

On 24 May 2012, her Ladytron bandmate Daniel Hunt announced that he would produce Marnie's solo album in Iceland in August 2012.

On 16 September 2012, Marnie set up a PledgeMusic account to help fund the making of her album. The album was produced in 2012 in Reykjavík, Iceland by her bandmate Daniel Hunt in collaboration with the Icelandic musician Barði Jóhannsson. Regarding her album, Marnie said that she wanted "to create an electronic album with more of a pop element and pristine vocals".

Marnie shot her first solo music video on 30 April in Glasgow with a group of friends. On 16 May 2013, she announced the cover and the title of the album, Crystal World. On 29 May 2013, Marnie premiered on her official YouTube account the music video directed by Michael Sherrington for her debut single as solo artist, "The Hunter".

After some delays, Marnie released her debut album Crystal World on 11 June 2013. After PledgeMusic copies of the CD version were delivered in July 2013, Crystal World was issued to stores by Les Disques Du Crépuscule in August 2013.

Marnie marked Record Store Day in April 2014 with a limited edition 12-inch single, The Hunter Remixed, featuring mixes by Stephen Morris (of Joy Division/New Order) and Glasgow electro radicals Roman Nose, as well as the album version of the song plus a mix of Sugarland by Mark Reeder. The single was limited to 500 copies in clear vinyl. She also released the James Slater directed music video of "Hearts on Fire" on the same day.

On 9 September 2014, she premiered a new single titled "Wolves" from the upcoming second solo album, initially planned for release in 2015. The song was produced by Jonny Scott and was released on iTunes on 14 September 2014. The music video was published on YouTube on 17 September and it was co-directed by Marnie and Michael Sherrington. On 18 April 2015 (Record Store Day), "Wolves" with a Marsheaux remix as a B-side was released on 7" vinyl as a limited edition (500 copies).

In 2015, Marnie performed vocals on Bang Gang' song "Silent Bite". In 2016, she collaborated with the musician RM Hubbert on the song "Sweet Dreams".

On 24 January 2017, she released the first single titled "Alphabet Block" from the forthcoming second solo album, Strange Words and Weird Wars.

== Touring ==
In 2015, Marnie started touring as a solo artist with a backing live band that consists of Emer Tumilty (synthesizers and backing vocals), Jonny Scott (guitar, synthesizers) and Peter Kelly (drums). She performed songs from her solo career and from Ladytron's back catalogue. Marnie and her live band played in Lima (Peru) and Santiago de Chile (Chile) so far.

== Musical influence ==
Marnie grew up with pop music like Whitney Houston, Belinda Carlisle, Michael Jackson, Madonna, The Bangles, Carly Simon, and ABBA. She claimed musical influences such as Kate Bush, Maria Callas, and Joni Mitchell. She also mentioned artists like Bat for Lashes, MGMT, Fairport Convention, Serge Gainsbourg, Grimes, and Chvrches as her favourites.

== Personal life ==
Marnie was married in 2011. Near the end of 2012 she moved back to Glasgow, after living in London for more than a decade.

In November 2024, Marnie opened up a coffee shop in Montrose.

== Instruments ==
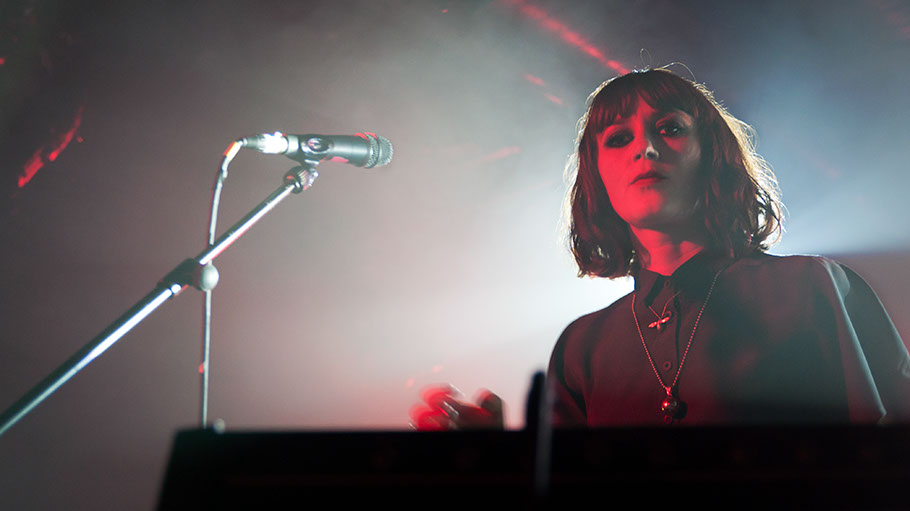
Helen Marnie live at the Arches, Glasgow, 2011

During Ladytron's live shows, Helen Marnie sings and occasionally plays one synthesizer. She has played the following instruments for Ladytron's live shows:

- Korg M500 Micro-Preset (604 tour)
- Roland Juno 6 (Light & Magic tour)
- Korg MS2000B (Witching Hour tour)
- Roland Juno-G (early part of Velocifero tour)
- Korg Delta (Velocifero, Best of 00–10 and Gravity the Seducer tours)

During the Witching Hour tour, Ladytron assigned different names to their four Korg MS2000B synthesizers in order to make sound checks easier. Marnie's MS2000B was named "Cleopatra."

On her solo career gigs, she sings and plays a Korg Delta.

== Discography ==
=== Ladytron ===
Studio albums

- 604 (2001)
- Light & Magic (2002)
- Witching Hour (2005)
- Velocifero (2008)
- Gravity the Seducer (2011)
- Ladytron (2019)
- Time's Arrow (2023)
- Paradises (2026)

=== Marnie ===
Studio albums

- Crystal World (2013)
- Strange Words and Weird Wars (2017)

Singles

- "The Hunter" (2013)
- "Wolves" (2014)
- "Alphabet Block" (2017)
- "Lost Maps" (2017)
- "Electric Youth" (2017)

EPs

- "The Hunter Remixed" (2013)
- "Lost Maps Remixed" (2017)

Music videos

- "The Hunter" (2013)
- "Hearts on Fire" (2014)
- "Wolves" (2014)
- "Lost Maps" (2017)
- "Electric Youth" (2017)

Collaborations

- Bang Gang - "Silent Bite" (2015)
- RM Hubbert with Marnie - "Sweet Dreams" (2016)
- Nightwave feat. Marnie - "Transmute" (2019)
- Union of Knives feat. Marnie - "A Tall Tale" (2020)
- Union of Knives feat. Marnie - "A Little Life" (2021)

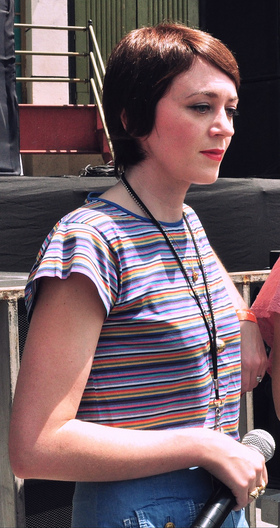
Helen Marnie in Mexico 2011
