= Alessandro Cortini =

Italian musician (born 1976)

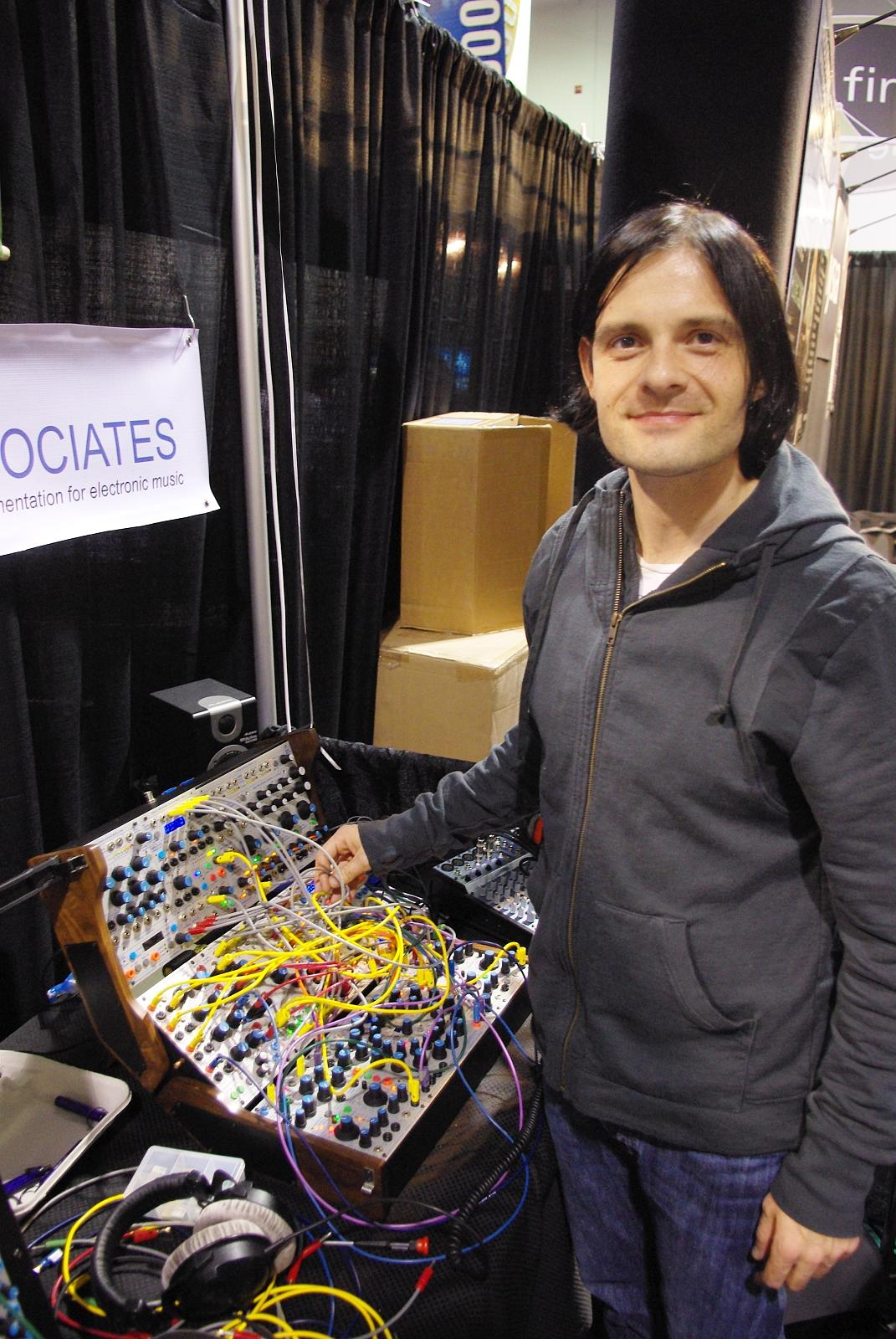
- Cortini with his Buchla 200e at the 2009 NAMM Show, in Anaheim, California.

Background information
- Born: 24 May 1976 (age 50); Bologna, Italy
- Genres: Alternative rock; industrial rock; industrial metal; indie pop; synth-pop; electronic
- Occupations: Musician; instrument maker
- Instruments: Vocals; keyboards; synthesizers; guitar; bass
- Years active: 1994–present
- Labels: Interscope; Mute; Important Records; Buddyhead; Modwheelmusic
- Member of: How to Destroy Angels; SONOIO; Blindoldfreak
- Formerly of: Nine Inch Nails; Modwheelmood
- Website: alessandrocortini.com

Alessandro Cortini (born 24 May 1976) is an Italian musician best known for his work with the American industrial band Nine Inch Nails. He plays modular synthesizers, keyboards, guitar, and bass guitar.

Cortini is the first Italian inducted into the Rock and Roll Hall of Fame in 2020, when he was inducted as a member of Nine Inch Nails.

== Early life and education ==
Cortini was born in Bologna, Italy and raised in Forlì, Italy. Cortini moved from Italy to the United States to study guitar at the Musicians Institute. After graduating, and straying away from the guitar, he decided to focus on keyboards and synths.

== Career ==
=== Early projects ===
From 2001 to 2002, Cortini acted as touring guitarist for The Mayfield Four in support of their album Second Skin.

In fall 2006, Cortini contributed to the Musicians Institute's Recording Artist Program by acting as advisor for one-on-one training with students.

He was also a founding member of Modwheelmood, an electronic/alternative band from Los Angeles, with former Abandoned Pools guitarist Pelle Hillström. Together they have released two EPs, ? (2003) and Enemies & Immigrants (2006). In 2007, they released Things Will Change, the companion remix disc for Enemies & Immigrants, and they released the first part of their new album Pearls to Pigs, Vol. 1 on 25 December 2007 exclusively as a digital release.

=== Nine Inch Nails ===
While briefly teaching at the Musicians Institute, he saw an ad for open auditions for Nine Inch Nails. Trent Reznor stated that Alessandro Cortini "fit in immediately." Reznor also stated that:

My first thought when Alessandro walked in was that he didn't look like what I had in mind. His presence was intense but gentle, not the "I'm gonna attack you" energy fans might associate with NIN. Then he started, and within 30 seconds I was like "That's the guy!" I never once regretted it. Without taking anything away from Charlie [Clouser], Alessandro is really into playing the studio parts as much as humanly possible.

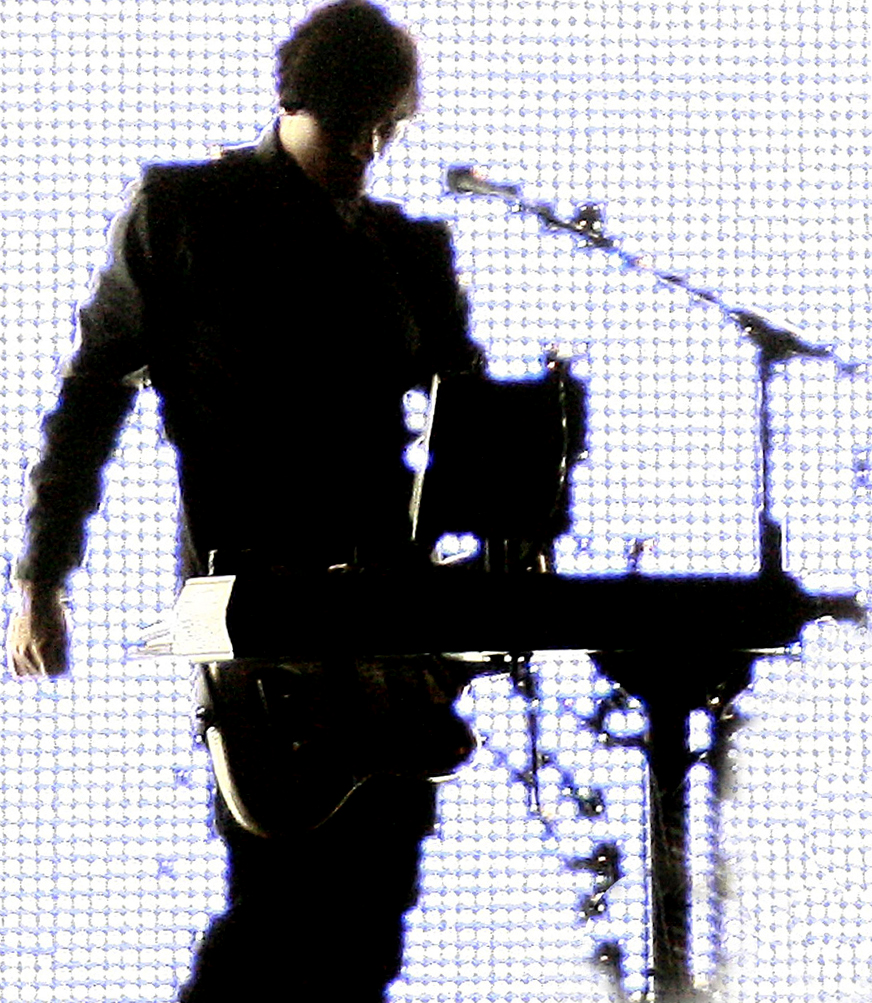
Cortini performing with Nine Inch Nails in 2007

Cortini toured with Nine Inch Nails from 2005 to 2008, during the band's "Live: With Teeth", "Performance 2007" and "Lights in the Sky over North/South America" tours. His primary role was that of touring keyboard player, although he also played guitar and bass guitar on some songs. Besides touring with the band, Cortini also contributed to the instrumental album Ghosts I–IV (receiving co-writing credits on a number of tracks) and the 2008 album The Slip. A Modwheelmood remix of "The Great Destroyer" was also released on the Year Zero remix album Year Zero Remixed, and Cortini features in the live DVD Beside You in Time, as well as the music videos for The Hand That Feeds and Survivalism. He left the band at the end of 2008, citing a desire to pursue other projects.

In March 2017, Nine Inch Nails' official Twitter account announced Cortini would be part of the 2017 summer performance lineup, during which his primary instrument was bass.

Cortini became the first Italian inducted into Rock and Roll Hall of Fame as a member of Nine Inch Nails in 2020.

=== How to Destroy Angels ===
Cortini joined How To Destroy Angels, a project consisting of Trent Reznor, Atticus Ross, Rob Sheridan and Mariqueen Maandig, as a touring member. He performs multiple instruments onstage and in addition remixed under his SONOIO moniker their single "The Spaces In-Between", which was used as the show finale for the majority of the tour. In 2013, Cortini returned to Nine Inch Nails as their touring member, and co-wrote the opening track of Hesitation Marks with Trent Reznor.

=== Solo works ===
In 2009, he completed a small Canadian tour under a solo project moniker, named blindoldfreak.

Cortini is also the frontman for the Los Angeles–based electronic-alternative band SONOIO, formed in summer 2010. The band name SONOIO comes from the Italian phrase "sono io", which means "it's me", as it is a solo project consisting solely of Alessandro Cortini. In July 2010 SONOIO released the album SONOIO Blue which was followed up by a remix album in December 2010, NON SONOIO. In June 2011, SONOIO released the album, SONOIO Red.

Cortini has released albums through Mute Records, Volume Massimo in 2019, Scuro Chiaro in 2021, and NATI INFINITI in 2024.

=== Collaborations with other artists ===
Alessandro Cortini worked with Ladytron in the production of two of their albums, Velocifero (2008) and Gravity the Seducer (2011). He also co-produced the second track, "We Are the Sea", from the debut album Crystal World (2013) of Ladytron's main singer, Marnie.

In 2009, he filled in for Morgan Nicholls (touring member of Muse) while Nicholls took a leave of absence to be with his newborn son.

In 2010, he contributed electronic production to a song called "Birds of Prey" by pop artist Christina Aguilera, produced by Ladytron. The song is featured on the deluxe edition of her fourth studio album Bionic.

Cortini released a collaborative album called "Illusion of Time" with Daniel Avery in March 2020.

=== Instruments ===
In 2021, Cortini released a patchable analog synth called Strega, Italian for “witch,” an instrument he created in collaboration with Make Noise.

== Discography ==
As himself

- 2013: Forse 1 (LP, released July 2013)
- 2013: Forse 2 (LP, released November 2013)
- 2014: Sonno (LP)
- 2015: Forse 3 (LP)
- 2015: Risveglio (LP, released July 2015)
- 2016: SPIE (EP, released 22 September 2016)
- 2017: Avanti (LP, released 6 October 2017)
- 2019: VOLUME MASSIMO (LP, released 27 September 2019)
- 2021: SCURO CHIARO (LP, released 11 June 2021)
- 2024: NATI INFINITI (LP, released 4 October 2024)
- 2025: VALVOLE (Single, released 21 February 2025)
- 2025: Memorie I (EP, released 9 April 2025)
- 2025: Il Mostro (Netflix Original Series Soundtrack) (Album, released 24 October 2025)
- 2026: Memorie (LP, released 28 August 2026)

SONOIO

- 2010: SONOIO (Blue, Album, September 2010)
- 2011: SONOIO (Red, Album, June 2011)
- 2018: Fine (Album, July 2018)

Blindoldfreak

- 2009: 1 (EP, 2009)

Modwheelmood

- 2003: ? (EP, 2003)
- 2006: Enemies & Immigrants (EP, released May 2006)
- 2007: Things Will Change (The companion remix disc to Enemies & Immigrants, released digitally in October 2007.)
- 2007: Pearls to Pigs, Vol. 1 (EP, released on 25 December 2007)
- 2008: Pearls to Pigs, Vol. 2 (EP, released on 26 February 2008)
- 2008: Pearls to Pigs, Vol. 3 (EP, released on 16 July 2008)
- 2009: Pearls to Pigs (Album, released on 2 June 2009)

With Nine Inch Nails

- 2007: Beside You in Time (live DVD/HD DVD/Blu-ray, 2007)
- 2007: Year Zero Remixed – "The Great Destroyer" (remixed by Modwheelmood)
- 2008: Ghosts I–IV
- 2008: The Slip
- 2013: Hesitation Marks

With Jovanotti

- 2008: Safari

With Ladytron

- 2008: Velocifero (Collaboration & production. Album, June 2008)
- 2008: Ghosts single (modwheelmood remix, May 2008)
- 2011: Gravity the Seducer (Collaboration & Production. Album, September 2011)

With Marnie

- 2013: "We Are the Sea" (Collaboration & Production. Album track, June 2013)

With Yoav

- 2008: Adore Adore (modwheelmood remix, 2008)
- 2008: Beautiful Lie (modwheelmood remix 2008)

With The Mayfield Four

- 2001: Second Skin

With Puscifer

- 2007: V is for Vagina (Synthesizer. Album, October 2007)
- 2011: Conditions of My Parole (Collaboration & Production. Album, October 2011) - "Oceans"

With Lawrence English

- 2018: Immediate Horizon (Album, November 2018)

With Alain Johannes and Norm Block

- 2019: Tom Clancy's Ghost Recon Breakpoint (Original Game Soundtrack) (LP, released 4 October 2019)

With Daniel Avery

- 2020: Illusion of time (Illusion de la tiempo) (LP, released 27 March 2020)
