= Blood into Wine =

2010 American documentary film

- Directed by: Ryan Page; Christopher Pomerenke
- Written by: Ryan Page; Christopher Pomerenke
- Cinematography: Cary Truelick
- Edited by: Robert Beadle
- Music by: Brian Williams
- Release date: February 19, 2010
- Running time: 100 minutes
- Country: United States
- Language: English

Blood into Wine is a 2010 documentary film about the Northern Arizona wine industry focusing on Maynard James Keenan and Eric Glomski and their Caduceus brand wine. It was released in February 2010 theatrically and on DVD and Blu-ray in September 2010. A soundtrack featuring remixes of Keenan's band Puscifer heard in the film was released, called Sound into Blood into Wine.

== Cast ==
- Maynard James Keenan
- Eric Glomski
- Milla Jovovich
- Tim Heidecker
- Bob Odenkirk
- Tim Alexander
- Eric Wareheim

Sound into Blood into Wine

Soundtrack album (compilation) by Puscifer
- Released: September 7, 2010
- Genre: Post-industrial, alternative rock
- Label: Puscifer Entertainment

Puscifer chronology
"C" Is for (Please Insert Sophomoric Genitalia Reference Here) (2009)	Sound into Blood into Wine (2010)	Conditions of My Parole (2011)

== Soundtrack ==
Sound into Blood into Wine is the soundtrack for the film Blood into Wine, starring Maynard James Keenan and Eric Glomski.

=== Track listing ===
No.	Title	Original release	Length
1.	"Sour Grapes" (Where's the Line? Mix)	Previously unreleased	7:27
2.	"Momma Sed" (Vis4V Mix)	"V" Is for Vagina	3:24
3.	"Queen B." (Vis4V Mix)	"V" Is for Vagina	3:55
4.	"The Undertaker" (Vis4V Mix)	"V" Is for Vagina	3:59
5.	"Drunk with Power" (Vis4V Mix)	"V" Is for Vagina	5:01
6.	"Rev 22:20" (Dry Martini Mix)	"V" Is for Vagina	5:07
7.	"Indigo Children" (Vis4V Mix)	"V" Is for Vagina	6:22
8.	"The Mission" ("M" Is for Milla Mix)	"C" is for (Please Insert Sophomoric Genitalia Reference HERE)	3:47
9.	"The Humbling River" (Nagual del Judith Mix)	Previously unreleased	5:01
10.	"World Up My Ass" (7-Inch Mix)	"Alan Moulder Mix" from Cuntry Boner	2:39
11.	"Sour Grapes" (Legend of the Mix)	Previously unreleased	4:15
12.	"The Humbling River" (Duet Mix)	Previously unreleased	5:07
