= All Re-Mixed Up =

Remix album by Puscifer
- Released: August 27, 2013
- Genre: Electronic
- Length: 60:34
- Label: Puscifer Entertainment

Puscifer chronology
Donkey Punch the Night (2013)	All Re-Mixed Up (2013)	Money Shot (2015)

All Re-Mixed Up is a remix album by Puscifer. It was released on August 27, 2013 by Puscifer Entertainment. It contains alternate versions, remixes and reworks of the 12 songs from Puscifer's second studio album, Conditions of My Parole. The album also features previous Puscifer contributors, such as Carina Round, and new musicians, such as Sir Mix-a-Lot, as remixers.

Samples of the entire album were released for streaming via Amazon on July 17, 2013. The entire album was streamed on Spin magazine's official website on August 20, 2013.

== Track listing ==
No.	Title	Remixer	Length
1.	"Tiny Monsters" (Deconstruct)	Mat Mitchell	4:08
2.	"The Green Valley" (Verde River Maestro 507 Mix)	Rani Sharone	4:18
3.	"Monsoons" (JLE Motorik Mix)	Josh Eustis	4:47
4.	"Telling Ghosts" (Giorgia O'Queef mix)	Carina Round	4:51
5.	"Horizons" (Dream of a Lie reMix)	John Fryer	7:42
6.	"Man Overboard" (11AD Remix)	Alain Johannes	5:13
7.	"Toma" (Burn Out Remix)	Five Knives	3:55
8.	"The Rapture" (JLE Needs Service Mix)	Josh Eustis	4:13
9.	"Conditions of My Parole" (F.U.B.A.R. remix)	Sir Mix-a-Lot	3:50
10.	"The Weaver" (Virtual Vacuum remix)	Aaron Harris	8:32
11.	"Oceans" (Green Mussel Mix)	Zac Rae	3:37
12.	"Tumbleweed" (Delusions of Grandeur mix)	The Beta Machine	5:28
Total length:			60:34
