= The Optimist (New Young Pony Club album) =

Studio album by New Young Pony Club
- Released: 5 March 2010
- Recorded: The Glue Factory
- Genres: Electropop; new wave
- Length: 45:27
- Label: The Numbers
- Producers: Tahita Bulmer; Andy Spence

New Young Pony Club chronology
Fantastic Playroom (2007)	The Optimist (2010)	NYPC (2013)

Singles from The Optimist
- 1. "Lost a Girl" Released: 20 December 2009 (promotional); 2. "Chaos" Released: 28 February 2010; 3. "We Want To" Released: 30 May 2010

Professional ratings
Aggregate scores
Source	Rating
Metacritic	61/100
Review scores
Source	Rating
AllMusic	3.5/5 stars
Clash	7/10
The Daily Telegraph	4/5 stars
Drowned in Sound	6/10
The Guardian	3/5 stars
MusicOMH	3.5/5 stars
NME	8/10
Pitchfork	5.5/10
PopMatters	4/10

The Optimist is the second studio album by English band New Young Pony Club. It was released on 5 March 2010 on the band's label The Numbers, distributed by the PIAS Entertainment Group. The album showcases a darker, more emotive sound for the band. The songs "Oh Cherie" and "Lost a Girl" were used, respectively, in the third and fourth episodes of the fourth season of Gossip Girl.

== Track listing ==
All tracks are written by Tahita Bulmer and Andy Spence, except where noted.

No.	Title	Length
1.	"Lost a Girl"	4:21
2.	"Chaos"	3:39
3.	"The Optimist"	5:36
4.	"Stone"	4:10
5.	"We Want To"	4:42
6.	"Dolls"	3:16
7.	"Before the Light"	5:28
8.	"Oh Cherie"	5:04
9.	"Rapture"	4:23
10.	"Architect of Love"	4:48

iTunes Store bonus tracks
No.	Title	Length
11.	"Chaos" (Manic Street Preachers South Wales Swamp Mix)	3:34
12.	"Chaos" (music video) (UK and Europe only)	3:17
13.	"Lost a Girl" (music video) (UK only)	4:22

Japanese edition bonus tracks
No.	Title	Length
11.	"Dress" (writer: PJ Harvey)	3:30
12.	"Chaos" (Rory Phillips Mix)	5:11
13.	"Chaos" (Johan and Dekker Remix)	7:12
14.	"Chaos" (Melé Remix)	5:56

== Personnel ==
Credits adapted from the liner notes of The Optimist.

New Young Pony Club

- Tahita Bulmer – performer, production
- Lou Hayter – extra vocals (tracks 2, 3, 5, 7), extra piano (track 7)
- Sarah Jones – drums (tracks 1, 2, 4, 5), extra vocals (tracks 2, 3, 5), additional drums (tracks 3, 6–8)
- Andy Spence – performer, production

Additional personnel

- Pete Fraser – saxophone (track 3)
- Liz Harry – art direction, design
- Mark McNulty – photography
- Al O'Connel – drum engineering (track 2)
- Morgan Quaintance – heys (track 1), extra Vox (track 4)
- Craig Silvey – mixing
- Tom Stanley – drum engineering (tracks 1, 4, 5)

== Charts ==
Chart (2010)	Peak position
UK Albums (OCC)	161
UK Independent Albums (Official Charts)	15

== Release history ==
Region	Date	Label	Ref.
Ireland	5 March 2010	The Numbers	
United Kingdom	8 March 2010	The Numbers	
Australia	19 March 2010	Liberator	
France	5 April 2010	PIAS	
Germany	16 April 2010	PIAS Integral	
Japan	21 April 2010	Hostess	
United States	4 May 2010	PIAS America	
