= "C" Is for (Please Insert Sophomoric Genitalia Reference Here) =

2009 EP by Puscifer

Remix album by Puscifer
- Released: November 10, 2009
- Genres: Trip hop, post-industrial
- Length: 28:46
- Label: Puscifer Entertainment

Puscifer chronology
| "D" Is for Dubby – The Lustmord Dub Mixes (2008) | "C" Is for (Please Insert Sophomoric Genitalia Reference Here) (2009) | Sound into Blood into Wine (2010) |

Professional ratings
Review scores
| Source | Rating |
|---|---|
| IGN | (9.0/10.0) |
| Antiquiet | 3/5 stars |

"C" Is for (Please Insert Sophomoric Genitalia Reference Here) is an EP by the Maynard James Keenan side project Puscifer, which was released on November 10, 2009. It contains four previously unreleased songs as well as two tracks from "V" Is for Vagina recorded live on Puscifer's 2009 tour. "C" Is for (Please Insert Sophomoric Genitalia Reference Here) has sold 10,000 copies.

== Release ==
Prior to the album's release, "The Mission" was released as a single. A video for the track was released in October 2009. The track "Polar Bear" was streamed on the band's website and MySpace page in the weeks leading to release.

The release of the album itself followed on November 10, 2009, as a digital download only release on iTunes and Amazon.com.

A physical release of the EP was on September 7, 2010. The exclusive 12-inch vinyl features an additional two bonus tracks.

On May 30, 2020, a limited edition jigsaw puzzle of the EP cover was released to commemorate the panic buying of toilet paper which occurred during the COVID-19 pandemic.

== Track listing ==
=== Digital download (2009) ===
| No. | Title | Writer(s) | Length |
|---|---|---|---|
| 1. | "Polar Bear" | M. Keenan, J. Eustis, M. Mitchell, T. O'Callaghan | 4:02 |
| 2. | "The Mission" (M Is for Milla Mix) | Keenan, D. Lohner, M. Jovovich | 3:43 |
| 3. | "Momma Sed" (Alive at Club Nokia) | Keenan, T. Commerford, B. Wilk, J. Polonsky | 6:13 |
| 4. | "Vagina Mine" (Alive at Club Nokia) | Keenan | 5:08 |
| 5. | "Potions" (Deliverance Mix) | Keenan, T. Reznor, Mitchell | 4:35 |
| 6. | "The Humbling River" | Keenan, Mitchell, T. Alexander | 5:05 |
| Total length: | | | 28:46 |

=== Vinyl (2010) ===
Vinyl re-release with two bonus tracks.

| No. | Title | Length |
|---|---|---|
| 1. | "Polar Bear" | 4:02 |
| 2. | "Potions" (Deliverance Mix) | 4:35 |
| 3. | "The Humbling River" (Nagual del Judith Mix) (from Sound into Blood into Wine) | 5:01 |
| 4. | "Vagina Mine" (Alive at Club Nokia) | 5:08 |
| 5. | "The Mission" (M Is for Milla Mix) | 3:43 |
| 6. | "Trekka" (Spaghetti Trekka Mix) (previously unreleased) | 3:11 |
| 7. | "The Humbling River" | 5:05 |
| 8. | "Momma Sed" (Alive at Club Nokia) | 6:13 |

== Personnel ==
All credits for "C" Is for (Please Insert Sophomoric Genitalia Reference Here) adapted from the EP’s liner notes.

Puscifer

- Maynard James Keenan – vocals, production, engineering (all)
- Mat Mitchell – production, engineering (all); bass (1, 5) programming (1, 4, 5) guitar (6)

Additional musicians

- Tim Alexander – drums (1, 3-6)
- Josh Eustis – piano, keyboards (1)
- Juliette Commagere – additional vocals (3, 4); acoustic guitar (3)
- Tanya O'Callaghan – bass (1)
- Milla Jovovich – additional vocals (2)
- Danny Lohner – programming (2)
- Gil Sharone – drums (3)
- Rani Sharone – bass (3)
- Carina Round – additional vocals (4, 6)
- Jeff Friedl – drums (4)
- Matt McJunkins – bass (4)
- Jonny Polonsky – guitar (4, 5); banjo (5); mandolin (5, 6)
- Devo Keenan – additional vocals, cello (6)

Production

- Michael Patterson – mixing
- Chris Risner – project manager
