= Donkey Punch the Night =

EP by Puscifer
- Released: February 19, 2013
- Recorded: Caduceus Cellars Bunker
- Genre: Alternative rock, post-industrial
- Length: 39:35
- Label: Puscifer Entertainment
- Producer: Mat Mitchell, Puscifer

Puscifer chronology
Conditions of My Parole (2011)	Donkey Punch the Night (2013)	All Re-Mixed Up (2013)

Donkey Punch the Night is the third EP by American alternative rock band Puscifer. It was released on February 19, 2013, via Puscifer Entertainment.

== Background ==
Professional ratings
Aggregate scores
Source	Rating
Metacritic	62%
Review scores
Source	Rating
Consequence of Sound	2.5/5 stars
AllMusic	3/5 stars
Artistdirect	5/5 stars
Emusic	4/5 stars
Exclaim!	7/10

Donkey Punch the Night is the follow-up to Puscifer's 2011 album, Conditions of My Parole, and features two new tracks ("Breathe" and "Dear Brother") as well as two covers, "Bohemian Rhapsody" by Queen and "Balls to the Wall" by Accept. Also included are remixes of the new tracks and of one cover.

The EP was released on February 19, 2013, in digital and CD formats, with a vinyl format later released on March 12, 2013. The EP was announced, along with the track listing and a set of Australian tour dates. The EP features some of the same line-up as Conditions of My Parole, including Keenan on vocals, Carina Round on vocals and guitar, Mat Mitchell on bass, guitar and programming, Juliette Commagere on additional vocals, Josh Eustis on guitar and piano, Matt McJunkins on bass and Jeff Friedl on drums and percussion, as well as guest musicians Zac Rae on piano, Josh Morreau on bass and Claire Acey on vocals. Artists included for the remixes include Drumcell, SONOIO, Jonathan Bates, and DJ Silent Servant.

== Track listing ==
No.	Title	Length
1.	"Bohemian Rhapsody" (Queen cover, O.G. mix)	5:52
2.	"Breathe"	4:40
3.	"Dear Brother"	3:43
4.	"Balls to the Wall" (Accept cover, Pillow Fight mix)	3:55
5.	"Breathe" (Drumcell rework)	7:24
6.	"Dear Brother" (Denton rework)	3:24
7.	"Balls to the Wall" (Silent Servant El Guapo mix)	4:11
8.	"Bohemian Rhapsody" (SONOIO Rework)	6:26
Total length:		39:35

== Personnel ==
- Maynard James Keenan – lead vocals
- Carina Round – additional vocals, guitar
- Mat Mitchell – bass, guitar, programming
- Josh Eustis – guitar, piano
- Matt McJunkins – bass
- Juliette Commagere – additional vocals
- Jeff Friedl – drums, percussion
- Zac Rae – piano
- Josh Morreau – bass
- Claire Acey – vocals
