= McJunkin =

McJunkin is an Irish surname. Notable people with the surname include:

- Daniel McJunkin, American Revolutionary patriot
- Ebenezer McJunkin (1819–1907), American politician from Pennsylvania
- George McJunkin (1851–1922), American cowboy in New Mexico who discovered the Folsom Site in 1908
- John F. McJunkin (1830–1883), American politician
- Joseph McJunkin (1755–1846), American Revolutionary War patriot
- Katherine McJunkin, American biologist

== See also ==
- Thomas-McJunkin-Love House, historic home located at Charleston, West Virginia
- Matt McJunkins (born 1983), American musician
- Prince McJunkins (1960–2021), American football player
