= Fantastic Playroom =

Studio album by New Young Pony Club
- Released: 6 July 2007
- Genres: Electropop; new wave; disco-rock
- Length: 39:07
- Label: Island
- Producers: Tahita Bulmer; Andy Spence

New Young Pony Club chronology
Fantastic Playroom (2007)	The Optimist (2010)

Singles from Fantastic Playroom
- 1. "Ice Cream" Released: 10 January 2005; 2. "The Get Go" Released: 27 June 2005; 3. "Get Lucky" Released: 20 March 2006; 4. "The Bomb" Released: 19 March 2007

Professional ratings
Aggregate scores
Source	Rating
Metacritic	69/100
Review scores
Source	Rating
AllMusic	4/5 stars
Drowned in Sound	6/10
The Guardian	2/5 stars
MusicOMH	3.5/5 stars
NME	7/10
Now	4/5
Pitchfork	8.2/10
PopMatters	9/10
The Times	4/5 stars

Fantastic Playroom is the debut studio album by English band New Young Pony Club. It was released on 6 July 2007 by Island Records. The album debuted at number 54 on the UK Albums Chart, selling 4,804 copies in its first week. As of March 2010, it had sold 32,986 copies in the United Kingdom. Fantastic Playroom was nominated for the Mercury Prize in 2007, and the band performed "The Bomb" on the awards night.

== Track listing ==
All tracks are written by Tahita Bulmer and Andy Spence, except where noted.

No.	Title	Length
1.	"Get Lucky"	3:43
2.	"Hiding on the Staircase"	3:31
3.	"Ice Cream"	3:12
4.	"The Bomb"	4:19
5.	"Jerk Me"	4:07
6.	"The Get Go"	4:29
7.	"Talking, Talking"	4:03
8.	"Grey"	4:13
9.	"F.A.N."	3:35
10.	"Tight Fit"	3:55

iTunes Store bonus track
No.	Title	Length
11.	"Descend"	4:57

Japanese edition bonus tracks
No.	Title	Length
11.	"Descend"	6:05
12.	"The Bomb" (Phones Collateral Damage Mix)	6:44
13.	"Fade in That Blank"	3:28
14.	"Take Me I'm Yours" (writers: Glenn Tilbrook, Chris Difford)	3:37
15.	"Ice Cream" (music video)
16.	"The Bomb" (music video)

== Personnel ==
Credits adapted from the liner notes of Fantastic Playroom.

New Young Pony Club

- Tahita Bulmer – vocals, additional production
- Lou Hayter – keyboards
- Sarah Jones – drums
- Andy Spence – guitar, production
- Igor Volk – bass

Additional personnel

- Dean Chalkey – photography
- Guy Davie – mastering
- Tom Elmhirst – mixing
- Nilesh Patel – mastering
- Richard Robinson – artwork

== Charts ==
Chart (2007)	Peak position
Australian Albums (ARIA)	79
Scottish Albums (Official Charts)	70
UK Albums (Official Charts)	54

== Release history ==
Region	Date	Label	Ref.
Ireland	6 July 2007	Island	
United Kingdom	9 July 2007	Island	
Germany	17 July 2007	Universal	
Australia	10 August 2007	Modular	
United States	28 August 2007	Modular; Interscope	
Japan	24 October 2007	Universal	
