= Blindoldfreak =

blindoldfreak
- Origin: Los Angeles, California, United States
- Genres: Electronica
- Years active: 2006–present
- Labels: Independent
- Members: Alessandro Cortini
- Website: blindoldfreak

Blindoldfreak (Officially: blindoldfreak) is the Electronic-Alternative solo project of Alessandro Cortini (best known as part of the Nine Inch Nails touring lineup from 2005 to 2008 and again since 2013). Cortini uses primarily the Buchla 200e when recording as Blindoldfreak, distinguishing it from his other solo work under the alias SONOIO and under his given name.

== Discography ==
- 2009: 1 (EP)
