= Matt McJunkins =

American musician (born 1983)

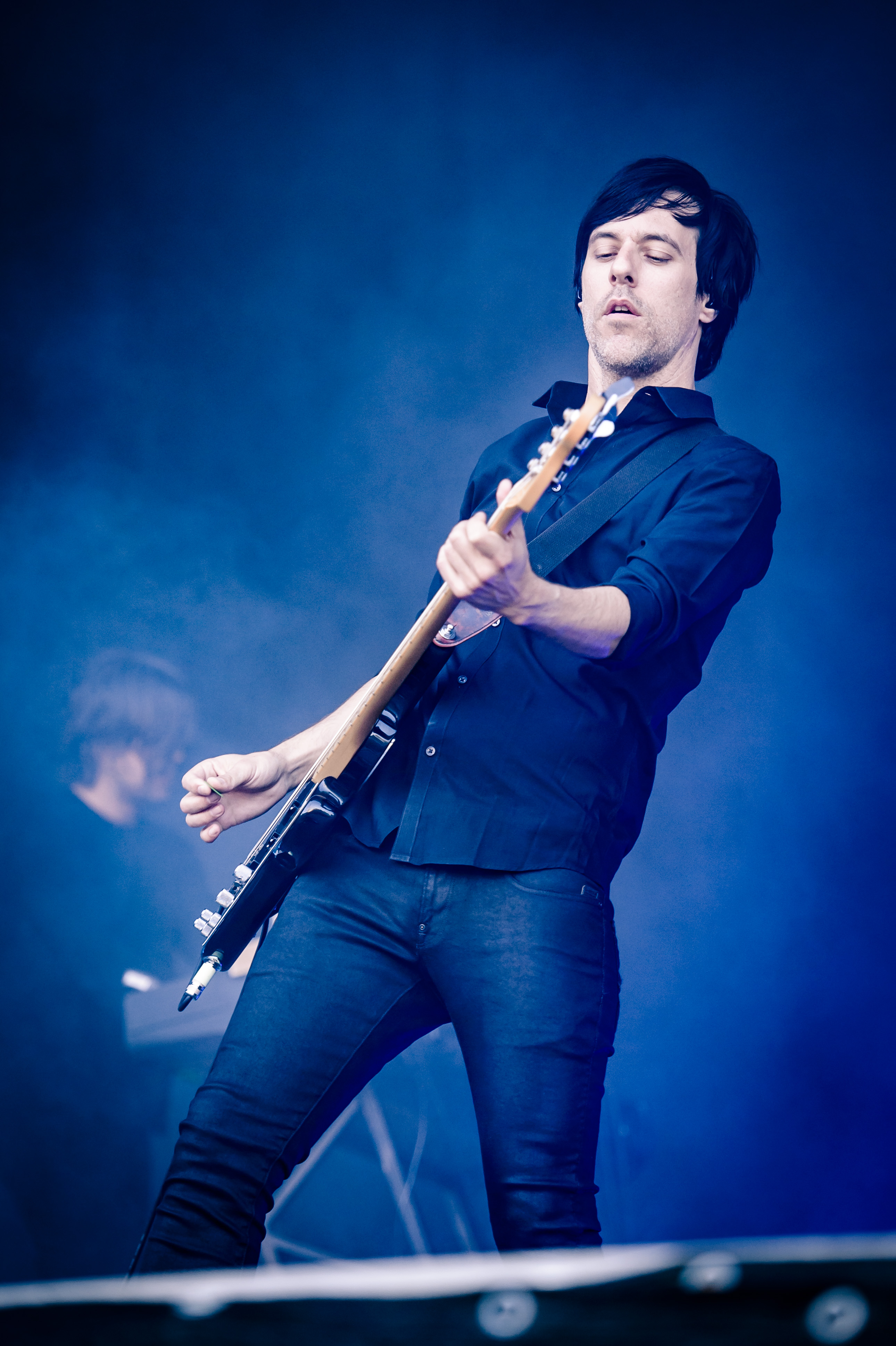
- McJunkins performing in 2018

Background information
- Born: March 19, 1983 (age 43)
- Genres: Alternative rock
- Occupations: Musician; photographer
- Instruments: Bass; keyboards; guitar; vocals
- Years active: 2005–present

McJunkins leads here. For people carrying the surname, see McJunkin

Matt McJunkins (born March 19, 1983) is an American musician and photographer best known for touring and recording with the American rock band A Perfect Circle. He is a former touring bassist for Eagles of Death Metal. He is one of the founding members of The Beta Machine, a rock band formed with Jeff Friedl. McJunkins has also worked with Thirty Seconds to Mars, Ashes Divide, Puscifer, Poppy and Socadia.

== Life and career ==
Matt McJunkins was raised in Palm Springs, California, where he started playing bass guitar at the age of 13. After high school, McJunkins moved to Los Angeles to pursue a music career. He attended the Musicians Institute and honed in on his craft while writing music and playing in several rock bands.

In 2008, Billy Howerdel from A Perfect Circle asked McJunkins to join his side project Ashes Divide, with Jeff Friedl, Andy Gerold and Adam Monroe completing the line-up. The band toured extensively in support of their debut album Keep Telling Myself It's Alright (2008), opening concerts for Seether, Stone Temple Pilots, and Filter, and also performed at the Projekt Revolution festival. McJunkins later toured with Puscifer, sharing bass guitar with Rani Sharone.

In September 2010, A Perfect Circle announced that they would reform and McJunkins was asked to join on bass alongside co-founders Billy Howerdel and Maynard James Keenan with Jeff Friedl and James Iha. In the following years, McJunkins formed The Beta Machine with Jeff Friedl and toured with Thirty Seconds to Mars in 2011. In January 2020, he announced he was touring with singer Poppy in support of her album I Disagree.

McJunkins was on stage with Eagles of Death Metal during the November 2015 Paris attacks, and escaped the Bataclan with the rest of the band. He managed to make it out of the venue.

== Discography ==
Solo albums

- Soundtrack for No One (2022)

With Puscifer

- "C" is for (Please Insert Sophomoric Genitalia Reference HERE) (2009)
- Conditions of My Parole (2011)
- Donkey Punch the Night (2013)
- Money Shot (2015)

With A Perfect Circle

- Three Sixty (2013)
- A Perfect Circle Live: Featuring Stone and Echo (2013)
- Eat the Elephant (2018)

With Poppy

- Eat (NXT Soundtrack) (2021)
- Flux (2021)
- Stagger (2022)
