= Conditions of My Parole =

Studio album by Puscifer
- Released: October 18, 2011
- Recorded: Caduceus Cellars Bunker
- Genre: Alternative rock; post-industrial
- Length: 50:54
- Label: Puscifer Entertainment
- Producer: Mat Mitchell; Josh Eustis; Maynard James Keenan

Puscifer chronology
Sound into Blood into Wine (2010)	Conditions of My Parole (2011)	Donkey Punch the Night (2013)

Conditions of My Parole is the second studio album by American rock band Puscifer. The album was produced by Maynard James Keenan, Mat Mitchell, and Joshua Eustis. Contributing musicians for the album include the aforementioned Keenan, Mitchell, and Eustis as well as Carina Round, Juliette Commagere, Matt McJunkins, Jeff Friedl, Gil Sharone and Rani Sharone, Jonny Polonsky, Tim Alexander, Devo Keenan, Alessandro Cortini, Tanya O'Callaghan, Sarah Jones, and Jon Theodore. The album cover and video for "Conditions of My Parole" featured Keenan and comedian Laura Milligan in character as Billy D. and Hildy Berger, marking the only time Keenan's full face appeared on the cover of a studio album.

== Critical reception ==
Professional ratings
Review scores
Source	Rating
AllMusic	3.5/5 stars
[&].com	8.5/10 stars

The album received positive reviews. Gregory Heaney of AllMusic described it as "a fine piece of cold weather headphone music".

== Track listing ==
All lyrics are written by Maynard James Keenan.

No.	Title	Music	Length
1.	"Tiny Monsters"	Josh Eustis/Mat Mitchell/Carina Round	4:44
2.	"The Green Valley"	Eustis/Mitchell/Round	3:55
3.	"Monsoons"	Eustis/Mitchell	4:17
4.	"Telling Ghosts"	Eustis/Mitchell/Jeff Friedl	4:49
5.	"Horizons"	Eustis/Mitchell	3:29
6.	"Man Overboard"	Eustis/Mitchell/Round	4:19
7.	"Toma"	Eustis/Mitchell/Round	3:40
8.	"The Rapture" (Fear Is a Mind Killa Mix)	Eustis/Mitchell/Round/Matt McJunkins	6:14
9.	"Conditions of My Parole"	Eustis/Mitchell/Round/McJunkins	2:54
10.	"The Weaver"	Eustis/Mitchell/Round	4:40
11.	"Oceans"	Eustis/Mitchell	3:43
12.	"Tumbleweed"	Eustis/Mitchell	4:16
Total length:			50:54

== Personnel ==
Performers

- Maynard James Keenan – lead vocals
- Carina Round – additional vocals (1–10, 12), guitar (2)
- Mat Mitchell – bass (1, 2, 6, 7, 10) guitar (1, 2, 4, 6, 8, 9, 10), programming (1, 4, 5, 6, 7, 11), banjo (2)
- Josh Eustis – programming (1, 3–7, 11), guitar (2, 5, 7, 9, 10, 12), piano (3), banjo (12), erhu (12)
- Jonny Polonsky – guitar (1, 3, 6, 7), mandolin (6)
- Jon Theodore – drums (2, 7, 9, 10)
- Matt McJunkins – bass (3, 4, 9)
- Devo Keenan – cello (3)
- Jeff Friedl – drums (3), percussion (3), additional percussion (6–8)
- Sarah Jones – drums (6, 7)
- Tanya O'Callaghan – bass (7)
- Gil Sharone – drums (8)
- Rani Sharone – bass (8)
- Juliette Commagere – additional vocals (11)
- Alessandro Cortini – Buchla (11)
- Tim Alexander – drums (12)

Production

- Ms. Puscifer – production
- Mat Mitchell – production, mixing
- Josh Eustis – mixing
- Bob Ludwig – mastering
- Brian Gardner – mastering
- Tim Cadiente – photography
- Juan Mendez – graphic design

== Charts ==
Chart (2011)	Peak position
US Billboard 200	27
