= Pelle Hillström =

Swedish music artist and songwriter

Pelle Sebastian Hillstrom is a Swedish music artist and songwriter from Jarbo, Gävleborg County. He is known for his work with Alessandro Cortini of Nine Inch Nails in Modwheelmood,

== Early life ==
His pursuit of music began early, playing saxophone in jazz orchestras in the afternoon and learning to play Iron Maiden songs in the evenings. Eventually, his desire to play music for a living led him to the United States where he quickly worked his way into the Los Angeles music scene.

== Musical Collaborations ==
Hillstrom met Nine Inch Nails keyboardist Alessandro Cortini in early 2000. The two began an intense collaboration, forming electro rock act Modwheelmood. The duo released their debut EP, Enemies & Immigrants, on Buddyhead records to critical acclaim. Their busy schedules hindered touring at that time but they have since built an impressive following of loyal fans.

Meanwhile, Hillstrom also joined the original Eels bassist Tommy Walter in the band Abandoned Pools. The band toured the US, Japan, Canada, and UK, opening for bands like Lenny Kravitz, Garbage, and The White Stripes. Pelle continued to dig into the scene, working as hired guitarist for producers like Patrick Leonard (Madonna, Elton John, Pink Floyd), Polarbear (Korn, Bootsy Collins, Snoop Dogg), Marc Jameson (Christina Aguilera, Felix da housecat), Redcola (commercials for Nike, Ford, Kodak, etc.), and Brad Wood (Smashing Pumpkins, The Bangles, Pete Yorn).

In 2005, he formed the act Forever Like Red and got signed to the Echo Label in the UK and to Chrysalis Publishing in the U.S. The band relocated to London in 2006 and recorded their debut album, Distance. The Sunday Times gave it four stars and called the band the next U2. Hillstrom toured the UK and Scotland extensively in 2007. They opened for acts like Silverchair and Pete Murray, Aerosmith, Crowded House, Jet, and Chris Cornell. The single, What Will You Pay, written by Hillstrom and Cameron Meshell, was aired on BBC 1 and the band's song Dream On was featured in an episode of the hugely popular TV show Hollyoaks in England.

Hillstrom worked on various projects as a songwriter and artist for Chrysalis. Modwheelmood has now released five EPs; ? (released in 2003), Enemies & Immigrants (released on Buddyhead in 2006), Pearls to Pigs, Vol. 1 (released in 2007), Pearls to Pigs, Vol. 2 (released in 2008), and Pearls to Pigs, Vol. 3 (released in 2008). As well as Things Will Change, the companion remix disc to Enemies & Immigrants (released in 2007). He continues to work with Cortini and Modwheelmood is producing new material.

== Komox ==
In 2014, Hillstrom joined the lineup of Komox, which includes frontman, Bryce Soderberg (Lifehouse), and drummer, Kris Persson. In January 2016, Komox released their debut EP, Dreaming Awake Volume 1. The band has been performing consistently around Los Angeles, San Diego and Las Vegas. Hillstrom and the rest of Komox signed a management deal with Kamelian, LLC, a label and management company headed by Michael Jackson's nephew and Tito Jackson's eldest son, Taj (3T). Pelle has co-penned two songs, Anything and Human, from the second volume of the Dreaming Awake due for release the summer of 2016. He currently resides in Los Angeles, working on Komox and various other music projects.
