= Puscifer =

American rock band

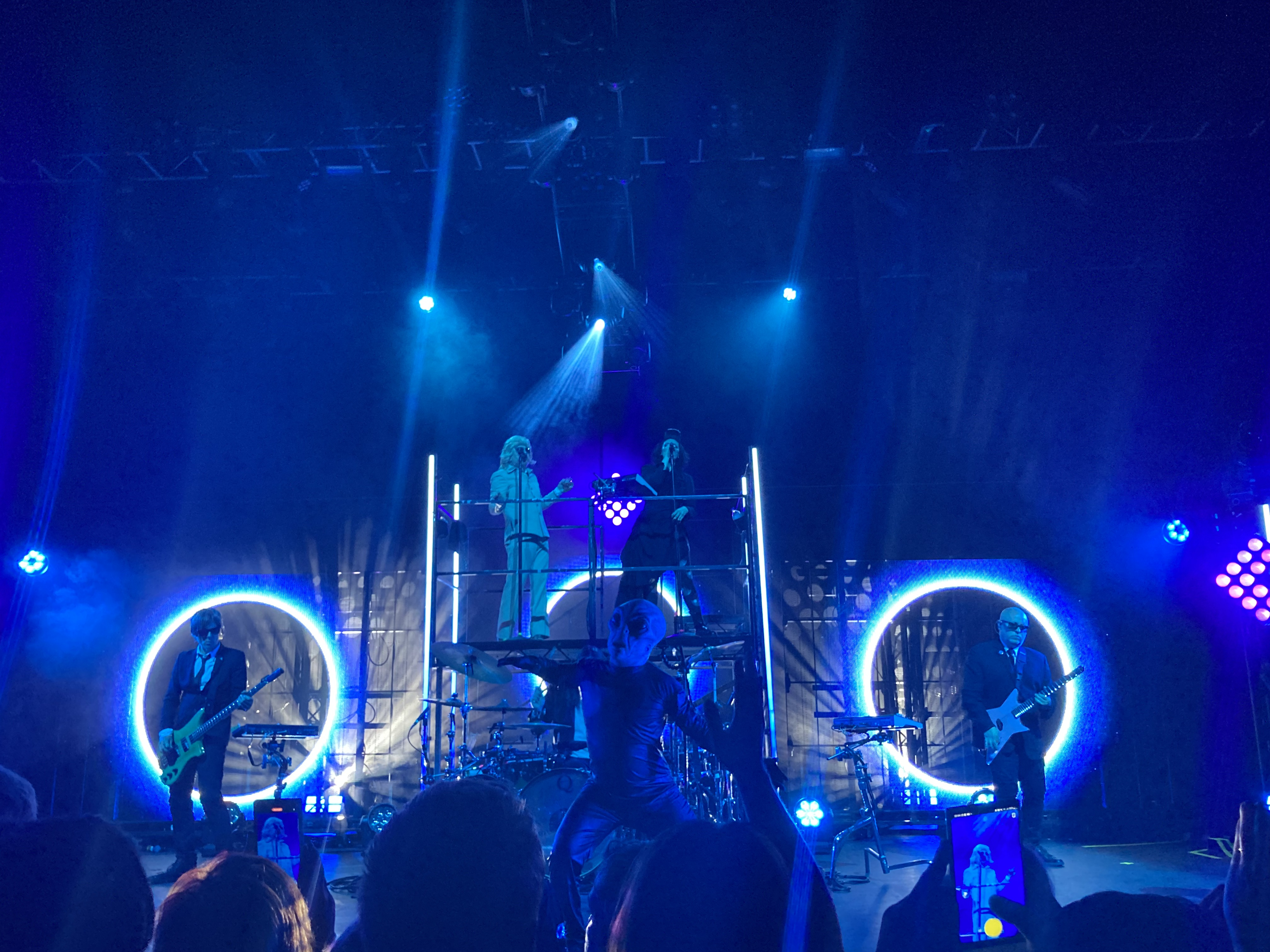
- Puscifer in 2023

Background information
- Origin: Los Angeles, California, U.S.
- Genres: Experimental rock; alternative rock; art rock; progressive rock; trip-hop; electronic rock; post-industrial
- Years active: 2003–present
- Label: Puscifer Entertainment
- Spinoff of: Tool
- Members: Maynard James Keenan; Carina Round; Mat Mitchell
- Website: puscifer.com

Puscifer (/ˈpʊsɪfər/) is an American rock group formed in Los Angeles by Maynard James Keenan, lead singer of Tool and A Perfect Circle. Keenan was the only constant member of the band and he considered the project to be his "creative subconscious". Later, frequent collaborators Mat Mitchell and Carina Round became permanent members.

== Background ==
Puscifer's original name was Umlaut, "a premiere improvisational hardcore band". The name "Puscifer" was first publicized as a fictional band in the first episode of Mr. Show, including Keenan and Adam Jones as members. Jones is not associated with Puscifer otherwise, although artwork by Jones has been featured on Puscifer apparel. Keenan describes Puscifer as "simply a playground for the various voices in my head, [...] a space with no clear or discernible goals, [...] where my Id, Ego, and Anima all come together to exchange cookie recipes." Keenan also worked on short films with Ford Englerth and Jeffrey Brooks from Red Rock Entertainment Development; these shorts were done in a similar manner to that of Mr. Show and Tom Waits' Big Time.

The first release under the Puscifer name was "Rev 22:20 (4:20 Mix)" in 2003 for the Underworld Original Soundtrack. Puscifer, at that time, was a collaboration between Keenan and former A Perfect Circle bandmate Danny Lohner. The duo would release "The Undertaker (Renholdër Mix)" in 2006 for the Underworld: Evolution Original Motion Picture Soundtrack.

Puscifer is "as much a clothing line as it is a band", with the clothing items produced in limited numbers. Keenan collaborated on a leather jacket with Paul Frank. On September 16, 2008, Keenan updated the puscifer.com blog, revealing that the first ever Puscifer store would be opening "hopefully" by October 1 in Jerome, Arizona. Occupying a small space above a tattoo parlor, the store opened on October 3, 2008. In addition to the merchandise available on the band's online store, Keenan has also made available locally roasted coffee, art, and an ever-changing list of limited edition collectibles.

=== Don't Shoot the Messenger ===
Don't Shoot the Messenger is a four-track EP released by Puscifer on October 9, 2007.

=== "V" Is for Vagina ===
On April 10, 2007, Keenan posted on the official website that a release would be aimed for mid-October. A newer post on June 25, 2007, stated that Joe Barresi mixed the first song, which had a music video made for it, as well as an alternate version of "Cuntry Boner", and that it would likely be released as a CD single with bonus tracks. Further mixing was done by Keenan and Alan Moulder by August.

Keenan announced at the end of July that the album was titled "V" Is for Vagina and, a few days later, he announced the first single, "Queen B.", with a video following in late September. On October 1, "Queen B." appeared on the podcast on puscifer.com. This was followed by the podcast release of "Trekka" on October 7. The album was released on October 30 and debuted at number 25 on the Billboard 200, as well as number 1 on the Billboard Independent Albums chart.

On October 17, 2008, an official music video for the song "Momma Sed" was released online via the official Puscifer YouTube channel. A dub remix album completely by Lustmord, entitled "D" Is for Dubby – The Lustmord Dub Mixes, also appeared at the official website's store.

"Momma Sed" also featured in the 2012 film End of Watch.

"V" Is for Vagina has sold 112,000 copies.

=== "V" Is for Viagra. The Remixes ===
A remix album entitled "V" Is for Viagra was released on April 29, 2008. It contains ten remixes of tracks from "V" Is for Vagina, as well as two remixes of the non-album single "Cuntry Boner". It features remixes by Dave "Rave" Ogilvie of Skinny Puppy, Lustmord, Renholder, Paul Barker from Ministry, Telefon Tel Aviv, among others.

Two of the tracks from the album, "Indigo Children" (JLE Dub Mix) and "Momma Sed" (Tandimonium Mix), appear on the official soundtrack for the video game Need for Speed: Undercover.

"V" Is for Viagra has sold 23,000 copies.

=== "D" Is for Dubby, the Lustmord Dub Mixes ===
A second remix album was released in October 2009. Titled "D" Is for Dubby, the album focuses on remixes of "V" Is for Vagina by artist Lustmord performed in a dub style.

=== "C" Is for (Please Insert Sophomoric Genitalia Reference Here) ===
"C" Is for (Please Insert Sophomoric Genitalia Reference Here) is an EP that was announced on the toolarmy.com and Puscifer websites on October 12, 2009. It was subsequently released on November 10, 2009. The EP contains six tracks; four previously unreleased songs, and two live recordings of tracks from "V" Is for Vagina, which were recorded from the Club Nokia shows on Puscifer's 2009 tour.

The EP has sold 10,000 copies.

The song "Rocket Mantastic" was later released.

=== Conditions of My Parole ===
"Man Overboard", the first single from the album, became available via iTunes and other digital service providers on July 19, 2011.

Conditions of My Parole was recorded at Jerome, Arizona, in spring 2011, with tracking done amidst the wine barrels from Keenan's Caduceus Cellars. The album was produced by Keenan, Mat Mitchell, and Josh Eustis. Contributing musicians for the album include the aforementioned Keenan, Mitchell, and Eustis as well as Carina Round, Juliette Commagere, Matt McJunkins, Jeff Friedl, Gil Sharone, and Rani Sharone, Jonny Polonsky, Tim Alexander, Devo Keenan, Alessandro Cortini, Sarah Jones, and Jon Theodore.

It debuted at number 27 on the Billboard 200 with 12,111 copies sold in its first week. With street date violations added in, it sold 12,337 copies according to SoundScan.

=== Donkey Punch the Night ===
Donkey Punch the Night was announced November 19, 2012 and released on February 19, 2013. The EP was released in digital and CD formats, with a vinyl release following on March 12, 2013. A cover of Queen's "Bohemian Rhapsody" is included on the EP, as well as a cover of Accept's "Balls to the Wall".

=== Money Shot ===
Money Shot was announced July 29, 2015 via the release of first single "Grand Canyon". The album was released on October 30, 2015. A remix album titled Money Shot Your Re-Load was released on November 25, 2016.

=== Existential Reckoning ===
On May 8, 2020, the lead single and video "Apocalyptical" were released along with an announcement of an album to be released in the fall of 2020. The fourth studio album Existential Reckoning was announced on September 17, 2020.

The release date for the album was later set to October 30, 2020, via Alchemy Recordings/Puscifer Entertainment/BMG.

The album was produced by Mat Mitchell and Puscifer, and recorded and mixed by Mat Mitchell at Puscifer Studios in North Hollywood. Keenan appears on the album as "Dick Merkin". This is the first album for which Mat Mitchell (guitar, bass, keyboards, programming) and Carina Round (vocals, keyboards) are credited as permanent members. Greg Edwards (bass, guitar, keyboards), Gunnar Olsen (drums), Sarah Jones (drums) and Esmé Bianco (vocals) also contributed to the album.

=== Normal Isn't ===
Released on February 6, 2026. Keenan appears as his goth alter ego "Bellendia Black".

== Live shows ==
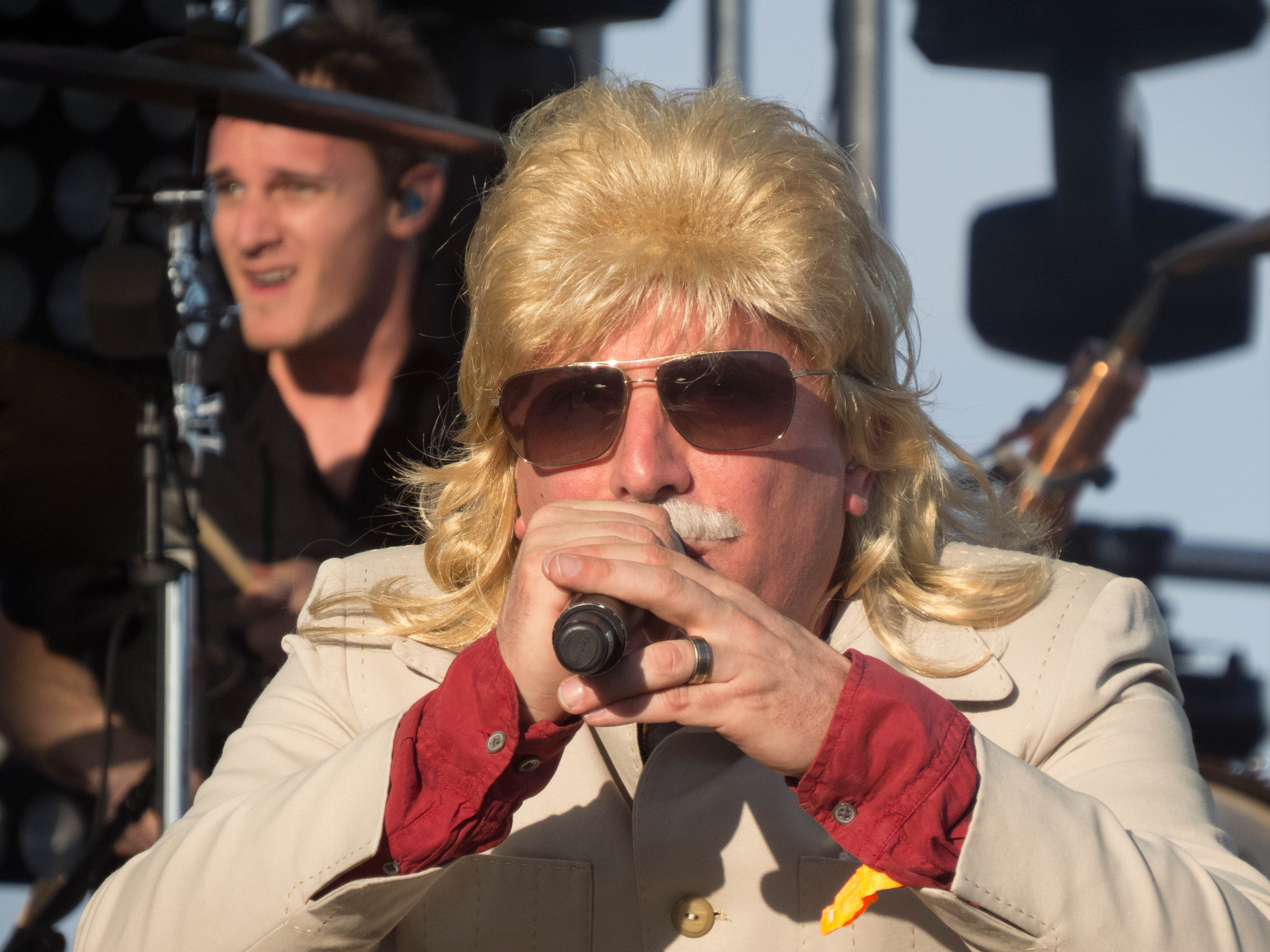
Maynard James Keenan performing with the rest of Puscifer at Coachella 2013

In February 2009, Keenan debuted Puscifer with shows in Las Vegas. Throughout the year, he continued to perform with a revolving lineup, but limited concerts to the Southwest. However, in a November 2009 interview, Keenan stated: "Efforts to confine our beloved enigma to the Southwestern United States have been thwarted. We are compelled beyond all reason to bring the noise Eastward and share our special sauce. Although authorities suggest you be prepared for any and all possibilities, we simply suggest you arrive happy and hungry."

Keenan took Puscifer on tour again in the fall and winter of 2011 in support of Conditions of My Parole. This tour covered a larger swath of the United States than previous West Coast-only tours.

In 2013, Puscifer played their first dates outside of North America, with the band performing three shows in Australia, and performances at Lollapalooza Brazil and Lollapalooza Chile.

On February 16, 2016, Puscifer announced UK and European dates under the "Money Shot Heard Around The World" tour. The band played Manchester and London in the UK, then France, Switzerland, Italy, Austria, Netherlands, Belgium, Luxembourg, Norway before ending the tour in Sweden at the Cirkus. They also performed at two festivals in Germany in 2016.

In late January 2017 Puscifer and guest act Luchafer toured Australia and New Zealand as part of the Money Shot: Round Under Tour.

On October 30, 2020, Puscifer held a limited streaming event of a pre-recorded, pre-edited concert film featuring the band performing their newest album Existential Reckoning in its entirety at Arcosanti, Arizona. The film was an audio-visual adventure performed with creative light and camera effects, with songs performed in various sets in and around Arcosanti itself. The lineup for the show featured: Maynard James Keenan (vocals), Mat Mitchell (guitar), Carina Round (vocals), Greg Edwards (bass), and Gunnar Olsen (drums). It was produced by Dino Paredes and Danny Wimmer, and directed by Adam Rothlein and Dino Paredes.

== Band members ==
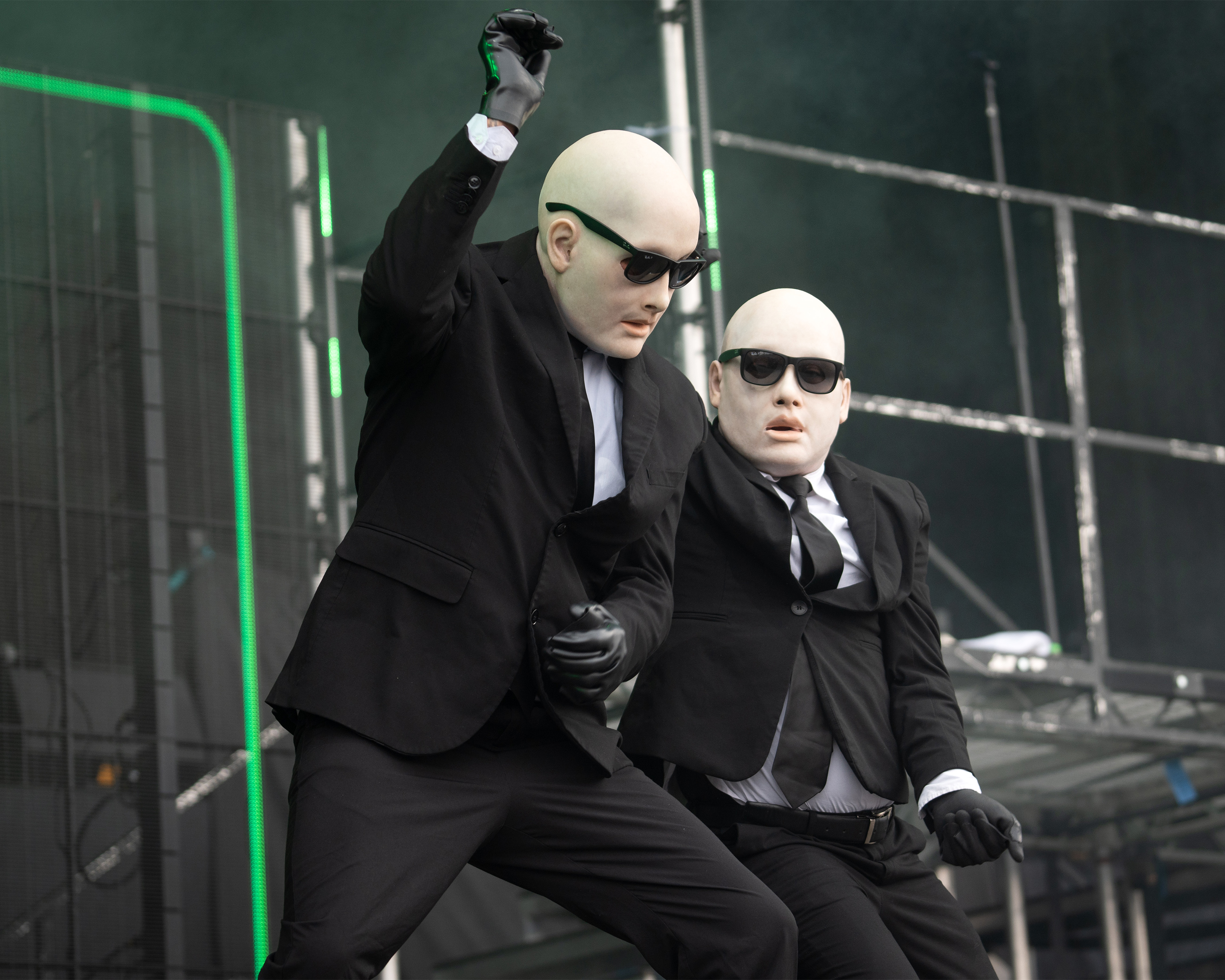
Puscifer at Hellfest 2023

Official members

- Maynard James Keenan: vocals (2003–present); acoustic guitar, percussion, drums, clarinet (2007)
- Mat Mitchell: guitar, bass, programming, keyboards, synthesizers, production (2009–present; studio 2007–2009)
- Carina Round: vocals, guitar, percussion, keyboards (2009–present)

Touring musicians

- Gunnar Olsen: drums, programming (2020–present)
- Josh Moreau: bass (2022, 2025–present)

Former members

- Danny Lohner (2003, 2006)

Former touring musicians

- Tim Alexander (2009–2010)
- Laura Milligan (2009–2010)
- Jonny Polonsky (2009–2010)
- Gil Sharone (2009–2010)
- Rani Sharone (2009–2010)
- Matt McJunkins: bass, backing vocals (2009–2014)
- Jeff Friedl: drums (2009–2017)
- Josh Eustis: keyboards (2011–2014)
- Paul Barker: bass (2015–2017)
- Mahsa Zargaran: keyboards, synthesizers, backing vocals (2015–2017)
- Juliette Commagere (2009–2010, 2021–2022)
- Greg Edwards: bass, backing vocals (2020–2025)

== Discography ==
=== Studio albums ===
List of studio albums, with selected chart positions
Title	Album details	Peak chart positions								
Title	Album details	US	AUS	BEL (FL)	BEL (WA)	CAN	FRA	GER	NZ	SWI
"V" Is for Vagina	Released: October 30, 2007 (US); Formats: CD, LP, digital download	25	27	—	—	—	194	—	22	—
Conditions of My Parole	Released: October 18, 2011 (US); Formats: CD, LP, digital download	27	—	—	—	—	—	—	—	—
Money Shot	Released: October 30, 2015 (US); Formats: CD, LP, digital download	30	51	130	—	82	—	—	—	—
Existential Reckoning	Released: October 30, 2020 (US); Formats: CD, LP, digital download	65	92	—	144	—	—	71	—	57
Normal Isn’t	Released: February 6, 2026 (US); Formats: CD, LP, digital download	142	35	78	62	—	— (Note: Normal Isn't did not enter the French Top Albums chart, but peaked at number 61 on the French Physical Albums chart.)	21	—	19
"—" denotes a recording that did not chart or was not released in that territory.

=== Remix albums ===
List of remix albums
Title	Album details
"V" Is for Viagra. The Remixes	Released: April 29, 2008 (US); Formats: CD, LP, digital download
"D" Is for Dubby – The Lustmord Dub Mixes	Released: October 17, 2008 (US); Formats: Digital download
Sound into Blood into Wine	Released: September 7, 2010 (US); Formats: Digital download
All Re-Mixed Up	Released: August 27, 2013 (US); Formats: CD, LP, digital download
Money Shot Your Re-Load	Released: November 25, 2016 (US); Formats: CD, LP, digital download
"V" is for Versatile	Released: November 11, 2022(US); Formats: CD, LP, digital download
Existential Reckoning: Rewired	Released: March 31, 2023 (US); Formats: CD, LP, digital download

=== Live albums ===
Title	Album details
What Is...	Released: November 26, 2013 (US); Formats: DVD, CD, Digital download
Puscifer's 8-Ball Bail Bonds – The Berger Barns Live in Phoenix	Released: November 29, 2013 (US); Formats: LP
Existential Reckoning: Live At Arcosanti	Released: November 11, 2021 (US); Formats: VHS, LP, Digital download
Billy D and the Hall of Feathered Serpents	Released: November 11, 2021 (US); Formats: CD, Digital download
V is for Versatile: A Puscifer Concert Film featuring music from the V is for… era	Released: October 28, 2022 (US); Formats: CD, LP, Digital download
Parole Violator: A Puscifer Concert Film featuring Conditions of My Parole	Released: October 28, 2022 (US); Formats: CD, LP, Digital download
Global Probing	Released: November 16, 2023 (US); Formats: CD, LP, Digital download
Cinquanta: A 50th Birthday Celebration For Maynard James Keenan – Live (with A Perfect Circle and Failure)	Released: March 22, 2024 (US); Formats: CD, LP
Normal Isn't: Live At The Pacific Stock Exchange	Released: May 30, 2026 (US); Formats: LP

=== Extended plays ===
List of extended plays, with selected chart positions
Title	EP details	Peak chart positions
Title	EP details	US
Don't Shoot the Messenger	Released: October 9, 2007 (US); Formats: Digital download	—
"C" Is for (Please Insert Sophomoric Genitalia Reference Here)	Released: November 10, 2009 (US); Formats: CD, LP, digital download	—
Donkey Punch the Night	Released: February 19, 2013 (US); Formats: CD, LP, Digital download	57
Sessanta E.P.P.P. (Split EP with A Perfect Circle and Primus)	Released: April 2, 2024 (US); Formats: CD, LP, Digital download	—

=== Singles ===
List of singles, with selected chart positions, showing year released and album name
Title	Year	Peak chart positions				Album
Title	Year	US Alt.	US Main.	US Rock	CAN Rock	Album
"Cuntry Boner"	2007	—	—	—	—	Non-album single
"Queen B."	2007	26	—	—	38	"V" Is for Vagina
"DoZo"	2008	—	—	—	—	"V" Is for Vagina
"The Mission"	2009	—	—	—	34	"C" Is for (Please Insert Sophomoric Genitalia Reference Here)
"Man Overboard"	2011	—	—	—	—	Conditions of My Parole
"Conditions of My Parole"	2011	—	—	—	—	Conditions of My Parole
"Telling Ghosts"	2012	—	—	—	—	Conditions of My Parole
"Grand Canyon"	2015	—	—	—	—	Money Shot
"The Remedy"	2015	—	37	—	—	Money Shot
"Apocalyptical"	2020	—	—	39	—	Existential Reckoning
"The Underwhelming"	2020	—	—	—	—	Existential Reckoning
"Self Evident"	2025	—	—	—	—	Normal Isn’t
"Pendulum"	2025	—	—	—	—	Normal Isn’t
"ImpetuoUs"	2026	—	—	—	—	Normal Isn’t
"Bad Wolf"	2026	—	—	—	—	Normal Isn’t
"—" denotes a recording that did not chart or was not released in that territory.

== Music videos ==
List of music videos, showing year released and director
Title	Year	Director(s)
"Cuntry Boner"	2007	Unknown
"Queen B."	2008	Meats Meier
"DoZo"	2008	Meats Meier
"Momma Sed"	2008	Christopher Sims
"The Mission"	2009	Meats Meier
"Man Overboard"	2011	Meats Meier
"Conditions of My Parole"	2011	Mike King, Flea Circus Films & Puscifer
"Telling Ghosts"	2012	Tim Cadiente & Meats Meier
"Bohemian Rhapsody"	2013	Mike King, Flea Circus Films & Puscifer
"Toma"	2014	Tim Cadiente
"Grand Canyon"	2015	Maynard James Keenan, Puscifer & Ghost Atomic
"Money Shot"	2015	Tim Cadiente & Puscifer
"The Remedy"	2015	Adam Rothlein & Puscifer
"The Arsonist"	2016	David Brown & Junior
"Apocalyptical"	2020	Puscifer, Meats Meier & Ghost Atomic
"Theorem"	2020	Maynard James Keenan
"Bullet Train to Iowa"	2021	Maynard James Keenan & Meats Meier
"The Algorithm"	2024	Unknown
"Self Evident"	2025	Mat Mitchell & María Aceves Diego
"Pendulum"	2025	Mat Mitchell, María Aceves Diego & Cassidy Rast
"Bad Wolf"	2026	AF Schepperd
"A Public Stoning"	2026	Unknown
"Normal Isn't"	2026	Unknown

== Contributions ==
Song	Length	Compilation	Track
"REV 22:20"	4:39	Underworld (2003)	2
"REV 22:20 (REV 4:20 Mix)" (Remixed by Charlie Clouser)	4:47	Saw II (2005)	6
"The Undertaker (Renholdër Mix)"	3:57	Underworld: Evolution (2006)	1
"Lighten Up, Francis (JLE Dub Mix)"	4:34	Underworld: Rise of the Lycans (2009)	1
"Holiday on the Moon (Puscifer Mix)"	5:08	New Tales to Tell: A Tribute to Love and Rockets (2009)	1
"The Humbling River"	5:05	Transformers: Fall of Cybertron trailer (2011)	1
"The Mission"	5:05	Warehouse 13 season 2, "Around the Bend" (2010)	1
"Rocket Mantastic" (with Steven Drozd)	5:28	The Heart Is a Drum Machine (The Score) (2011)	5
"Tumbleweed"	4:16	Yellowstone Season 1, "Daybreak" (2018)	5
"The Humbling River"	5:05	Yellowstone Season 1, "No Good Horses" (2018)	3
"Green Valley"	3:55	Yellowstone Season 1, "The Unravelling: Pt. 1" (2018)	1
"Grand Canyon"	5:58	Yellowstone Season 1, "The Unravelling: Pt. 1" (2018)	4
