= Crystal World =

2013 album by Marnie

Studio album by Marnie
- Released: 11 June 2013
- Recorded: August – December 2012 in Reykjavík, Iceland
- Genre: Electronic; synth-pop; new wave; dream pop
- Length: 47:08
- Label: PledgeMusic; Pylon; Crépuscule
- Producer: Daniel Hunt; Barði Jóhannsson; Alessandro Cortini

Marnie chronology
Crystal World (2013)	Strange Words and Weird Wars (2017)

Singles from Crystal World
- 1. "The Hunter" Released: 29 May 2013

Crystal World is the debut studio album by Scottish musician Marnie, self-released on 11 June 2013 through the site PledgeMusic. The album was produced in 2012 in Reykjavík, Iceland, by her Ladytron band-mate Daniel Hunt in collaboration with the Icelandic musician Barði Jóhannsson. Alessandro Cortini also produced the second song, "We Are the Sea". Crystal World comprises ten original songs written by Marnie while Ladytron had a break after their fifth studio album, Gravity the Seducer in 2011. Crystal World is available in these formats: music download, CD, 12" vinyl.

== Background and recording ==
In an interview for The Electricity Club site, Marnie said: "I played around with the idea for a couple of years and joked about it for a while. I had a handful of songs and when Ladytron had some time off last year, I began to believe it could be a reality. I thought if I have the opportunity, I'm just going to go for it. So I started writing as much as I could."

On 24 May 2012, her Ladytron band-mate Daniel Hunt announced that he would produce Marnie's solo album in Iceland in August 2012. Daniel Hunt, in collaboration with the Icelandic musician Barði Jóhannsson, produced Marnie's album. The album was recorded in Reykjavík, Iceland from August to early October 2012 and then for few days in December 2012.

Marnie said on her PledgeMusic account about her debut album: "For the past year I've been writing more than ever, and I'm so pleased with the results thus far. The album, as yet untitled, is straight from the heart. I can't put it any other way. It means a lot. It is me, no one else. It is everything around me, my loves, my life, hopes and loss. I wanted to create an electronic album with more of a pop element and pristine vocals. Lyrically, the album is expansive, but the elements do play a part in much of the record, with the sea being particularly dominant and reoccurring. So, with the sea in mind and beautiful landscapes, I decided to fly to Iceland to record in a studio there. The light is so pretty, the air fresh, the sea vast, that I thought it would be the perfect setting to record."

Regarding the recording process of her album, Marnie said in an interview with The VPME: "I'd say 8 out of the 10 songs were written specifically for a solo record. The others were a little older but I knew I wanted them used for something. I guess after December 2011, I really started to write a lot, until I went to Iceland in August 2012. So that 7-month period was quite productive for me. 9 songs were taken to Iceland and completed. I then wrote the final track 'Gold' at home in Glasgow late last year, flew for one last time to Reykjavík, and recorded it there in December 2012. Having time away from touring really gave me the incentive to write." She also mentioned that the majority of the songs were written over the course of 6–8 months.

== Promotion and release ==
On 16 September 2012, Marnie started the PledgeMusic campaign in order to fund the making of her solo album. She also posted a short trailer about this project. She achieved 100% of her goal in three days.

Helen Marnie offered various items for potential pledgers, like digital download/CD/gatefold vinyl of the album, signed 8x10 studio photos, disposable cameras filled with random pictures chosen by her, market bags customized with her logo, screen printed posters, handwritten lyric sheets, a pair of shoes and a dress that she wore in Ladytron's "Tomorrow" music video, a blue bikini that she wore in a pool photoshoot, personalized ringtone package, test pressing package, and her 1998 Mini Cooper Sport car.

On 16 February 2013, Marnie offered to the pledgers a 1-minute 45 seconds preview of an unfinished version of one of her songs titled "The Hunter".

Marnie shot her first solo music video on 30 April in Glasgow with a group of friends. On 16 May 2013, she announced the cover and the title of the album, Crystal World. On 29 May, Marnie premiered on her official YouTube account the music video for her debut single as solo artist, "The Hunter". The video was directed by Michael Sherrington, who also directed Ladytron's "Mirage" video.

On 1 June, she shared to the pledgers a 55-second-long sample from a song titled "Hearts on Fire" and also confirmed the official track listing of the album.

The album was initially scheduled to be released in March 2013, but it was delayed multiple times, to 10 May, then 31 May, and then 2 June. The album was released and available for download to pledgers on 11 June 2013 in FLAC and mp3 formats. There were 1517 pledges in total and she achieved a bit over 250% of her initial goal.

On 15 June 2013, the album was released as music download on iTunes and Amazon through Cobraside label. In August 2013 the album was issued on CD format by Les Disques Du Crépuscule.

Marnie released the James Slater-directed music video of "Hearts on Fire" on 19 April 2014.

== Singles ==
"The Hunter" was released as first single on 29 May 2013 through a music video. On 12 August 2013, "The Hunter" was released on 7" vinyl format (limited edition) on Soft Power Records. The B-side of this disc is "The Wind Breezes On". There were 200 clear vinyls pressed for pledgers and another 300 classic black vinyls for general release.

Marnie released a special single titled "The Hunter Remixed" through Les Disques du Crépuscule. It was issued in a strictly limited edition of 500 copies on clear 12" vinyl to celebrate Record Store Day on 19 April 2014. The single includes the original version of "The Hunter", two "The Hunter" remixes (one by Stephen Morris of Joy Division/New Order, and another one by the Scottish electronic band Roman Nose), and a "Sugarland" remix by Mark Reeder.

== Reception ==
Professional ratings
Review scores
Source	Rating
eMusic	4.5/5 stars
Pitchfork	6.3
Polari Magazine	5/5 stars
The Electricity Club	(positive)
The VPME	10/10

Crystal World was positively reviewed by the site The Electricity Club: "'Crystal World' achieves Marnie's objective 'to create an electronic album with more of a pop element and pristine vocals' but it is more than that. Like Marnie herself, this album is pretty. Vocally and musically expansive, it is like a dreamy arctic escapist fantasy."

The music site The VPME rated Crystal World 10 out of 10 and named the album "an electro-pop map of the human heart with more empathy, warmth and spirit than a million contrived indie lad rock 'anthems'." The reviewer also added: "make no mistake, this is a hugely emotive record which sees Helen step out from behind her mysterious sultry Ladytron persona and reveal herself to be a songwriter of enormous emotional depth and honesty, able to produce songs which are poetic, fragile, heartfelt and often downright heart-breakingly beautiful."

Polari Magazine rated the album 5 out of 5, and added: "Crystal World is a rich and assured debut by a woman who has crafted and explored electronic music for more than a decade, a body of work which has lent itself to this album’s escapist and dreamy textures." Victoria Segal on eMusic rated the album 4.5 out 5, saying that Crystal World "feels less strict, less pristine, as if all the wires and circuitry are slowly starting to melt down."

== Track listing ==
All tracks are written by Marnie.

No.	Title	Length
1.	"The Hunter"	4:13
2.	"We Are the Sea"	5:09
3.	"Hearts on Fire"	5:04
4.	"Violet Affair"	3:38
5.	"The Wind Breezes On"	3:58
6.	"Sugarland"	3:22
7.	"High Road"	3:43
8.	"Laura"	5:13
9.	"Submariner"	7:39
10.	"Gold"	5:09
Total length:		47:08

== Personnel ==
- Marnie - vocalist, songwriter
- Daniel Hunt - producer on tracks 1–9
- Barði Jóhannsson - producer on track 10, co-producer, recording
- Alessandro Cortini - co-producer on track 2
- Dave Schiffman - mixing
- Doug van Sloun - mastering (at Focus)
- Karl James Pestka - violin/viola on track 10
- Johann Hjorleifsson - additional percussion on tracks 3, 8, 9
- Lisa Devine - photography
- Laura Hussey - cover design
