= "V" Is for Viagra. The Remixes =

Remix album by Puscifer
- Released: April 29, 2008
- Recorded: 2007
- Genre: Trip hop, post-industrial
- Length: 61:15
- Label: Puscifer Entertainment
- Producer: Mat Mitchell, Puscifer

Puscifer chronology
"V" Is for Vagina (2007)	"V" Is for Viagra. The Remixes (2008)	"D" Is for Dubby – The Lustmord Dub Mixes (2008)

Professional ratings
Review scores
Source	Rating
AllMusic	3/5 stars

"V" Is for Viagra. The Remixes is a remix album by Puscifer, a side project of Maynard James Keenan, which was released on April 29, 2008. It contains ten remixes of tracks from the first Puscifer album "V" Is for Vagina, as well as two remixes of the non-album single "Cuntry Boner".

In November 2008, "Indigo Children" (JLE Dub Mix) and "Momma Sed" (Tandemonium Mix) appeared on the official soundtrack for the video game Need for Speed: Undercover.

An additional track, "Lighten Up, Francis" (JLE Dub Mix) appears on the official soundtrack to the film Underworld: Rise of the Lycans.

"V" Is for Viagra has sold 23,000 copies.

== Track listing ==
No.	Title	Remixer	Length
1.	"Indigo Children" (JLE Dub Mix)	Josh Eustis	5:24
2.	"Trekka" (Desert Porn Mix)	Lustmord	6:39
3.	"Momma Sed" (Tandimonium Mix)	Dave "Rave" Ogilvie & Colin Janz	4:42
4.	"Sour Grapes" (Late for Dinner Mix)	Danny Lohner	4:07
5.	"Cuntry Boner" (Dirty Robot Mix)	Mat Mitchell & Troy Van Leeuwen	3:58
6.	"Drunk with Power" (Hungover and Hostile in Hannover Mix)	Joey Jordison	6:22
7.	"Vagina Mine" (Deflowering Mix)	Paul Barker	5:11
8.	"Trekka" (The Great Unwashed Mix)	Aaron Turner	7:21
9.	"Queen B." (Glitched and Bent Mix)	Richard Devine	5:05
10.	"DoZo" (Guns for Hire Mix)	Lustmord	5:01
11.	"Queen B." (Narcovice Mix Radio Edit)	Michael Patterson	3:08
12.	"PSA, LOL!!"		0:22
13.	"Cuntry Boner" (Disco Viagra Mix)	Sean Beavan	3:51
Total length:			61:15
