= Money Shot (album) =

2015 studio album by Puscifer

Studio album by Puscifer
- Released: October 30, 2015
- Genres: Alternative rock; post-industrial
- Length: 51:36
- Label: Puscifer Entertainment
- Producer: Puscifer

Puscifer chronology
All Re-Mixed Up (2013)	Money Shot (2015)	Money Shot Your Re-Load (2016)

Singles from Money Shot
- 1. "Grand Canyon" Released: July 29, 2015

Money Shot (stylized as Money $hot) is the third studio album by American rock band Puscifer, released on October 30, 2015.

== Release ==
On July 29, 2015, the album was announced via the release of the first single, "Grand Canyon".

The vinyl version features an exclusive mix of "Simultaneous" featuring Daniel Ash (Bauhaus/Love And Rockets).

=== Remix album ===
On November 25, 2016, a remix album with versions of tracks from Money Shot was released, entitled Money Shot Your Re-Load.

== Critical reception ==
Professional ratings
Aggregate scores
Source	Rating
Metacritic	68/100
Review scores
Source	Rating
Blabbermouth.net	7.5/10
Consequence of Sound	B
Exclaim!	7/10

Writing for Exclaim, Calum Slingerland noted that while the record is more focused compositionally than its predecessor, Conditions of My Parole, the increased presence of vocalist Carina Round, and the consistent desert-weary feel of the work are undeniable positives.

== Track listing ==
All songs written by Maynard James Keenan, Mat Mitchell & Carina Round, except where noted.

No.	Title	Length
1.	"Galileo"	5:17
2.	"Agostina"	4:24
3.	"Grand Canyon"	5:57
4.	"Simultaneous"	6:42
5.	"Money Shot"	2:32
6.	"The Arsonist"	4:45
7.	"The Remedy"	6:07
8.	"Smoke and Mirrors" (Written by M. Keenan/M. Mitchell)	5:05
9.	"Flippant"	6:24
10.	"Life of Brian (Apparently You Haven't Seen)"	4:41
11.	"Autumn"	6:06
Total length:		58:00

"Flippant" appears only on some digital download versions of the album. The vinyl version of "Simultaneous" (6:35) has a different first part, narrated by Daniel Ash.

== Personnel ==
Adapted from the album credits.

- Maynard James Keenan – lead vocals
- Carina Round – lead vocals (tracks 1–7, 9–11)
- Mat Mitchell – bass, guitar, keyboards, mandolin (1, 2), banjo (11)
- Jeff Friedl – drums (1, 2, 3, 5, 6, 7)
- Jon Theodore – drums (6, 7, 11)
- Matt McJunkins – bass (2, 5)
- Juliette Commagere – keyboards (1, 2, 4, 6, 7, 11), background vocals (6)
- Tim Alexander – drums (2)

== Charts ==
2015–2016 chart performance
Chart (2015–2016)	Peak position
Australian Albums (ARIA)	51
Belgian Albums (Ultratop Flanders)	130
Canadian Albums (Billboard)	82
US Billboard 200	30
US Independent Albums (Billboard)	2
US Indie Store Album Sales (Billboard)	5
US Top Alternative Albums (Billboard)	2
US Top Rock Albums (Billboard)	3

2023 chart performance
Chart (2023)	Peak position
UK Independent Albums (Official Charts)	42

== Money Shot Your Re-Load ==
Money Shot Your Re-Load

Remix album by Puscifer
- Released: November 25, 2016
- Genres: Alternative rock; post-industrial
- Length: 67:37
- Label: Puscifer Entertainment

Puscifer chronology
Money Shot (2015)	Money Shot Your Re-Load (2016)	Existential Reckoning (2020)

Money Shot Your Re-Load is a remix album by Puscifer. It was released on November 25, 2016, by Puscifer Entertainment. It contains alternate versions, remixes and reworks of the 11 songs from Puscifer's third studio album, Money Shot. The album also features previous contributors, such as Carina Round, and new remixers, such as Tool bassist Justin Chancellor and The Crystal Method member Scott Kirkland, as remixers. The album was released on special colored double vinyl for Record Store Day, with two additional tracks, one of which is exclusive to the vinyl format.

=== Track listing ===
No.	Title	Remixer	Length
1.	"Galileo" (Lead into Gold Mix)	Lead into Gold	8:10
2.	"Agostina" (Carina Round Mix)	Carina Round	5:18
3.	"Grand Canyon" (Mat Mitchell Mix)	Mat Mitchell	6:22
4.	"Simultaneous" (Justin Chancellor Mix)	Justin Chancellor and Scott Kirkland	6:06
5.	"Moneyshot" (Baseck Mix)	Baseck	4:39
6.	"The Arsonist" (Xiu Xiu Mix)	Xiu Xiu	5:42
7.	"The Remedy" (3 Kord Scissor King Mix)	Mark Brooks	4:19
8.	"Smoke and Mirrors" (The Beta Machine Mix)	The Beta Machine	5:44
9.	"Life of Brian" (Omniflux Mix)	Omniflux	5:05
10.	"Autumn" (Polyfuse Mix)	Polyfuse	5:28
11.	"Simultaneous" (Twin Limb Mix)	Twin Limb	7:38
12.	"Moneyshot" (Chris Schleyer Mix)	Chris Schleyer	3:06
Total length:			67:37
