= Queen B. =

- DVD cover

Single by Puscifer

from the album "V" Is for Vagina
- Released: 2007
- Genre: Alternative rock, trip hop, dance-rock
- Length: 7:55
- Label: Puscifer Entertainment
- Songwriter(s): Maynard James Keenan, Tim Alexander
- Producer(s): Maynard James Keenan

Puscifer singles chronology
"Cuntry Boner" (2007)	"Queen B." (2007)	"DoZo" (2008)

"Queen B." is the first single released from the album "V" Is for Vagina by Puscifer. It peaked at number 26 on the Billboard Hot Modern Rock Tracks chart in late 2007. The music video version of the song is around 20 seconds longer than the album version of the song.

== Track listing ==
1. "Queen B." – 3:54
2. "DoZo" – 4:00

== Music video ==
Directed by Meats Meier, the video is of fully CGI 'Maynards' and two 'Puscifers' playing a game of chess, as two women sit close by and drink wine, a possible reference to Maynard James Keenan's wine production. The game features the Scholar's mate.

== Use in other media ==
- The song was featured at the opening of Warehouse 13 episode "Implosion", episode 7 of season 1.
