= Pearls to Pigs =

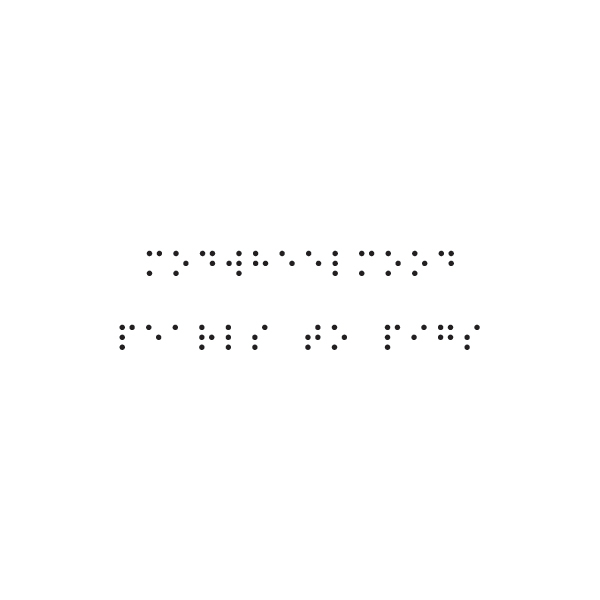

Studio album by Modwheelmood
- Released: June 2, 2009
- Recorded: 2007, 2008
- Genre: Electro; Pop; Alternative
- Length: 55:38
- Label: ModwheelMusic

Modwheelmood chronology
Pearls to Pigs, Vol. 3 (2008)	Pearls to Pigs (2009)

Pearls to Pigs is an LP and the seventh release by American electronic-alternative rock band Modwheelmood. The LP was released as an amalgam of the first three Pearls to Pigs EPs with a new track, "Happily Delayed", on June 2, 2009 at the first show of their West Coast tour in Scottsdale, Arizona. The album was digitally released in June 2009.

== Track listing ==
1. Problem Me - 4:23
2. MHz - 4:45
3. Forli' - 1:28
4. Bellevue Ave - 4:23
5. Too Late - 3:22
6. Crumble - 4:08
7. Sunday Morning - 3:32
8. If I Was You - 4:03
9. Domenica Pomeriggio - 1:09
10. Scene - 3:17
11. Your Place - 0:23
12. Happily Delayed - 4:20
13. Lie - 3:41
14. Thursday - 4:16
15. Madrid - Changes - 2:40
16. Scared of Everyone - 5:56

== Cover art ==
The cover art of the album is the band and album name written in braille.
