= Modwheelmood =

American electronic/alternative pop band

- Origin: Los Angeles, California, US
- Genres: Alternative pop, electronica
- Years active: 1998–2009
- Labels: Independent; Former labels include: Buddyhead Records
- Members: Alessandro Cortini; Pelle Hillström; Jesper Kristensen
- Website: modwheelmood.com

Modwheelmood (also typeset as ModWheelMood or modwheelmood and abbreviated as MWM) is an American electronic/alternative pop band from Los Angeles, California, formed in 1998 by Alessandro Cortini (who is also part of the Nine Inch Nails concert lineup and former Abandoned Pools guitarist Pelle Hillström.

== History ==
Modwheelmood formed in 1998, initially as a project entitled Gift?, which later developed into a full music project after Cortini's experimentation with "heavy loops and haunting synth passes integrated with melodic songwriting" and through collaboration with Hillström. Modwheelmood are named after the mod wheel, a controller typically mounted on the left hand of the keyboard.

Modwheelmood have released five EPs; ? (released in 2003), Enemies & Immigrants (released on Buddyhead in 2006), Pearls to Pigs, Vol. 1 (released in 2007), Pearls to Pigs, Vol. 2 (released in 2008), and Pearls to Pigs, Vol. 3 (released in 2008). As well as Things Will Change, the companion remix disc to Enemies & Immigrants (released in 2007). In March 2000, Modwheelmood was awarded the Artist Development Industry Choice at the Musicians Institute in Hollywood and were "honored with the inclusion of their songs "Anyone", "Sleep" and "Headgames" on three different Musicians Jams promotional CDs." Two of these songs, "Anyone" and "Sleep", would later appear on Modwheelmood's first EP, ?.

Subsequently, much of Enemies & Immigrants was conceived and recorded by Alessandro Cortini "in hotel rooms across the world" while touring with Nine Inch Nails throughout 2005 to 2006 in support of their 2005 album With Teeth. However, Hillström has made equal contribution to the EP. He has stated that there are "decidedly more acoustics on this EP than their first," to create "more of a lush, earthly, percussive sound." In addition, Hillström adds that the EP was conceived with the objective of "making music that meant something to us." The release of Enemies & Immigrants was followed by a West Coast tour of the U.S. with Mellowdrone and Monsters Are Waiting. While Enemies & Immigrants was released on Buddyhead Records, Modwheelmood is currently unsigned to a record label.

Recently, Modwheelmood released the EP Pearls to Pigs, Vol. 1 as a digital-only release on the December 25, 2007. This was followed by the digital release of Pearls to Pigs, Vol. 2 in February 2008. The next release, Pearls to Pigs, Vol.3, was released in July 2008, after problems with mixing and mastering caused it to be delayed. In addition, Modwheelmood have remixed Nine Inch Nails' "The Great Destroyer", which appears on the remix album Year Zero Remixed. and Ladytron's song "Ghosts" from their latest album Velocifero. The remix appeared on the Ghost single. In 2008, Modwheelmood remixed "Adore Adore" and "Beautiful Lie" of South-African artist Yoav, for the EP Charmed and Rearranged.

In 2008, on December 13, Alessandro left Nine Inch Nails after 4 years in the band. On the Modwheelmood website, he explains that he left the band to "move onto new things," showing his ambition to make something new with Modwheelmood.

Beginning in June 2009, coinciding with their West Coast tour, Modwheelmood released Pearls to Pigs physically as a CD, limited-edition vinyl, and on download cards sold at concerts. The new version of Pearls to Pigs includes an extra track, "Happily Delayed", and new accompanying artwork. The digital download of the 2009 version of the album also includes demos and b-sides ("betas") of the tracks included on Pearls to Pigs and an accompanying PDF with artwork and the bits from the band members about the genesis' and recording of each track on the album.

== Influences ==
Both Cortini and Hillström have had influences which have underpinned their musical decisions and concepts. Cortini was encouraged by his family at an early age to develop an interest in music, and prominent influences of his include the Beatles, Cat Stevens, Francesco De Gregori, Depeche Mode, Alva Noto and Brian Eno. Hillström began developing an interest for music and composition by "playing saxophone in jazz orchestras in the afternoon and learning Iron Maiden riffs in the evening" and by moving to the U.S. to satisfy his "desire to play music for a living."

== Musical characteristics ==
Buddyhead Records described Modwheelmood's sound as "alternative pop electronica" while also being "a stimulating departure from the typical laptop based bands who label themselves as 'electronica'." Due to their use of analog synths, sparse, raw and ambient guitars and soft, falsetto-like vocals, Modwheelmood have often been compared with Radiohead. However, critics of Modwheelmood often assert that their style is unique. In a review of Enemies & Immigrants, Allmusic's Jason MacNeil states that Modwheelmood's electronic style "seem[s] to come from a slightly different angle than bands like Nine Inch Nails and Depeche Mode." Prefix Magazine's Chris Sahl, however, is more critical, stating that "Modwheelmood paradoxically sounds like no other band and is almost entirely derivative."

== Discography ==
- 2003: ? (EP)
- 2006: Enemies & Immigrants (EP)
- 2007: Things Will Change (The companion remix disc to Enemies & Immigrants, released digitally only)
- 2007: Pearls to Pigs, Vol. 1 (released digitally only)
- 2008: Pearls to Pigs, Vol. 2 (released digitally only)
- 2008: Pearls to Pigs, Vol. 3 (released digitally only)
- 2009: Pearls to Pigs

Remixes

- 2007: "The Great Destroyer" by Nine Inch Nails on Year Zero Remixed
- 2008: "Ghosts" by Ladytron on Ghosts EP
- 2008: "Adore Adore" & "Beautiful Lie" by Yoav on "Charmed and Rearranged EP"
