= Things Will Change =

Remix album by Modwheelmood
- Released: 2007
- Genre: Electro; Pop; Alternative
- Length: 70:23

Modwheelmood chronology
Enemies & Immigrants (2006)	Things Will Change (2007)	Pearls to Pigs, Vol. 1 (2007)

Things Will Change is the companion remix disc to Enemies & Immigrants by American rock band Modwheelmood released in 2007. The proceeds from the sale of this album are given to the Los Angeles–based charity Create Now, a charity that deals with assisting and helping the lives of high-risk and at-risk youth through creative arts, mentoring, resources and opportunities. This album was conceived by and produced in collaboration of The 857 Collective's Celeste Peterson (née Tabora) and has only been released digitally.

== Track listing ==
1. Yesterday (TRS-80 Dark Circles Mix) – 3:53
2. Going Nowhere (Home Video Remix) – 6:32
3. Delay Lama (Mellowdrone Remix) – 3:46
4. Things Will Change (Remodeled by Alva Noto) – 8:15
5. Things Will Change (Brightest Feather Remix) – 3:58
6. As I Stand Here (Thavius Beck Remix) – 3:10
7. Money fo Good (Ulysses Dub) – 5:50
8. Delay Lama (Nalepa Remix) – 6:01
9. Things Will Change (Kangding Ray Remix) – 4:08
10. Going Nowhere (Aaron Spectre Remix) – 5:18
11. Delay Lama (Paul & Price Remix) – 4:15
12. As I Stand Here (Cyrus Rex & Anon Remix) – 4:43
13. Going Nowhere (Christopher Willits Remix) – 3:10
14. Yesterday (Roger O'Donnell Remix) – 7:24
