= SONOIO =

American musical project

Sonoio
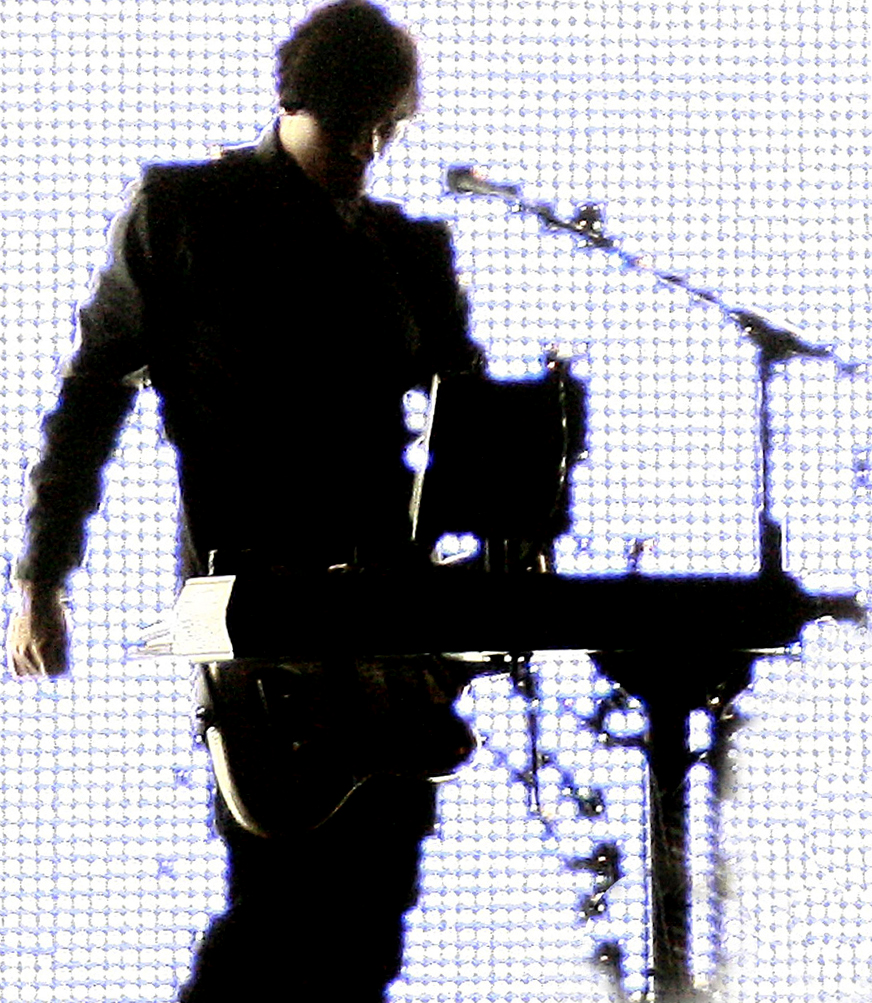

Background information
- Origin: Los Angeles
- Genres: Electronic; synth-pop; industrial metal
- Years active: 2010–present
- Members: Alessandro Cortini
- Website: sonoio.org

Sonoio (stylized as SONOIO) is a solo project of Italian musician Alessandro Cortini, best known as the keyboardist for Nine Inch Nails' touring lineup and as a member of Modwheelmood. The name of the alternative rock/electronic project comes from the Italian phrase "sono io", which means "I am" or "it's me".

== Career ==
On July 28, 2010, Cortini released four free tracks from an upcoming album, Blue, which was released on September 14, 2010, in physical and digital formats Blue is a nine-track album created entirely on Buchla modular synths, and one deluxe version of the album included an electronic synthesizer called the SuONOIO (Italian for "I make sound") which contains samples and sound sources used in the album. On December 23, 2010, Sonoio released a free nine-track digital-only remix album entitled Non Sonoio consisting of reinterpretations by Ladytron, Big Black Delta, Richard Devine, and others.

On May 30, 2011, Sonoio released four free tracks from its second album, Red. The album was released on June 21, 2011. It is a nine-track album which is available for purchase and in various digital and physical formats. On September 20, 2011, a remix album for Red was announced. This was made available as NON (Red) on 21 December, with a high-definition download offered for a small fee alongside free MP3 files of the album.

On September 15, 2014, a new video was posted by Cortini's YouTube account for a song called "Thanks for Calling".

Cortini released a third Sonoio album, Fine, in July 2018.

== Touring ==
In autumn 2011, Sonoio opened for Ladytron on the latter's Gravity the Seducer headline tour of North America.

== Discography ==
=== Studio albums ===
- Blue (2010)
- Red (2011)
- Fine (2018)

=== Remix albums ===
- Non (Blue) (2010)
- Non (Red) (2011)
