= "V" Is for Vagina =

Studio album by Puscifer
- Released: October 30, 2007
- Recorded: 2006–2007
- Genre: Alternative rock; trip hop; post-industrial
- Length: 48:51
- Label: Sony BMG; Puscifer Entertainment
- Producer: Mat Mitchell; Puscifer

Puscifer chronology
Don't Shoot the Messenger (2007)	"V" Is for Vagina (2007)	"V" Is for Viagra. The Remixes (2008)

Singles from "V" Is for Vagina
- 1. "Queen B." Released: November 2007; 2. "DoZo" Released: February 2008

Professional ratings
Review scores
Source	Rating
AllMusic	3/5 stars
Billboard	(unfavorable)
Kerrang!	4/5 stars
Metal Hammer	4/5 stars
Rolling Stone	2.5/5 stars

"V" Is for Vagina is the debut studio album by Maynard James Keenan's side project Puscifer, released on October 30, 2007. The album features a significantly different, electronic sound and arrangements than Keenan's other bands: the progressive Tool and alternative A Perfect Circle. Keenan himself compared the sound of "V" Is for Vagina to "driving around in your car listening to those old Motown hits, James Brown, and cool R&B stuff". "V" is for Vagina has sold 112,000 copies.

== Release ==
The album was preceded by a non-album, retail-only single called "Cuntry Boner", released on October 2, 2007. Released a week later was an iTunes-only four track EP titled Don't Shoot the Messenger, with tracks previously released only on soundtracks.

On October 30, 2007, a second single, and first actual radio single from the album, "Queen B." was posted into a flash audio player on the official website, along with selected tracks by Keenan projects. On October 1, 2007, the video was posted on the Puscifer YouTube channel. The video features several fully CGI Maynards as pawns in a chess game between two women. The album debuted at number 25 on the Billboard 200, selling about 27,000 copies in its first week. On October 7, 2007, "Trekka (Sean Beaven Mix)" was published on Puscifer.com, and on October 25, 2007, the entire album was put up for listening.

On October 17, 2008, an official music video for the song "Momma Sed" was released online via the official Puscifer YouTube channel.

The vinyl edition of "V" is for Vagina was re-released in August 2016.

=== Remix albums ===
On April 28, 2008, a remix album with versions of tracks from "V" Is for Vagina was released, entitled "V" Is for Viagra. The Remixes.

In 2022 another remix titled "V" is for Versatile released.

== Track listing ==
CD
No.	Title	Writer(s)	Length
1.	"Queen B."	Maynard James Keenan, T. Alexander	3:56
2.	"DoZo"	Keenan, B. Lustmord	4:00
3.	"Vagina Mine"	Keenan	5:35
4.	"Momma Sed"	Keenan, T. Commerford, B. Wilk, J. Polonsky	3:24
5.	"Drunk with Power"	Keenan, B. Lustmord	5:01
6.	"The Undertaker"	Keenan, D. Lohner	4:00
7.	"Trekka"	Keenan, B. Lustmord	4:46
8.	"Indigo Children"	Keenan	6:22
9.	"Sour Grapes"	Keenan, J. Polonsky, T. Alexander	6:45
10.	"REV 22:20" (Dry Martini Mix)	Keenan, D. Lohner	5:08
Total length:			48:51

E-Deluxe Edition bonus tracks
No.	Title	Writer(s)	Length
11.	"The Undertaker" (Spanish Fly Mix)		3:44
12.	"Lighten Up, Francis"	M. Keenan, T. Alexander	4:10
13.	"Queen B." (BLESTeNATION Mix)		3:25
14.	"Momma Sed" (BLESTeNATION Mix)		4:47
15.	"Queen B." (music video)		4:12
Total length:			69:09

=== Vinyl edition ===
Also on April 29, 2008, the album was released as a limited edition double vinyl album featuring two bonus tracks (which were also made available on the E-Deluxe Edition).

Side A:

1. "Queen B." (M. Keenan, T. Alexander) – 3:56
2. "DoZo" (Keenan, B. Lustmord) – 4:00
3. "Lighten Up, Francis" (Keenan, T. Alexander) – 4:10

Side B:

1. "Vagina Mine" (Keenan) – 5:35
2. "Momma Sed" (Keenan, T. Commerford, B. Wilk, J. Polonsky) – 3:24
3. "The Undertaker" (Spanish Fly Mix) – 3:44

Side C:

1. "Drunk with Power" (Keenan, Lustmord) – 5:01
2. "Trekka" (Keenan, Lustmord) – 4:46
3. "Indigo Children" (Keenan) – 6:22

Side D:

1. "The Undertaker" (Keenan, D. Lohner) – 4:00
2. "Sour Grapes" (Keenan, Polonsky, Alexander) – 6:45
3. "REV 22:20" (Dry Martini Mix) (Keenan, Lohner) – 5:08

== Personnel ==
Performers

- Maynard James Keenan – vocals, acoustic guitar, percussion, drums, clarinet
- Joe Barresi – guitar
- Mat Mitchell – bass, guitar, programming
- Tim "Herb" Alexander – drums, drum engineering
- Jeremy Berman – percussion, drums
- Alessandro Cortini – synthesizer
- Ainjel Emme – acoustic guitar, vocals
- Josh Eustis – guitar, programming, Wurlitzer
- Alain Johannes – guitar
- Gil Sharone – percussion, drums
- Rani Sharone – bass, guitar, percussion, fretless bass, baritone guitar
- Juliette Commagere – vocals (11)
- Trey Gunn – guitar, bass (12)
- Alfredo Nogueira – pedal steel
- Jonny Polonsky – piano, clarinet, sampling, loops

Production

- Bob Ludwig – mastering
- Brian Lustmord – programming
- Eddie McClintock – artwork, design
- Lynn Sanchez McClintock – production director
- Alan Moulder – mixing
- Andy Savours – mixing

== Charts ==
Chart (2007)	Peak position
Australian Albums (ARIA)	27
French Albums (SNEP)	194
New Zealand Albums (RMNZ)	22
US Billboard 200	25
