= Pearls to Pigs, Vol. 1 =

EP by Modwheelmood
- Released: 2007
- Genre: Electro; Pop; Alternative
- Length: 18:15
- Label: None

Modwheelmood chronology
Things Will Change (2007)	Pearls to Pigs, Vol. 1 (2007)	Pearls to Pigs, Vol. 2 (2008)

Pearls to Pigs, Vol. 1 is an EP and the 4th release by American Electronic-Alternative Rock band Modwheelmood. It was released digitally only on December 25, 2007. This was the first of a series of releases, the next being Pearls to Pigs, Vol. 2, which was released in February, 2008. The album was mixed by Alex Newport and mastered by Paul Lyman at Infrasonic Mastering. "Mhz" and "Bellevue Ave" feature Jesper Kristensen on drums.

== Track listing ==
1. Problem Me - 04:21
2. MHz - 04:23
3. Forli' - 01:28
4. Bellevue Ave - 04:22
5. Too Late - 03:21
