= Thomas-McJunkin-Love House =

Historic house in West Virginia, United States

- U.S. National Register of Historic Places
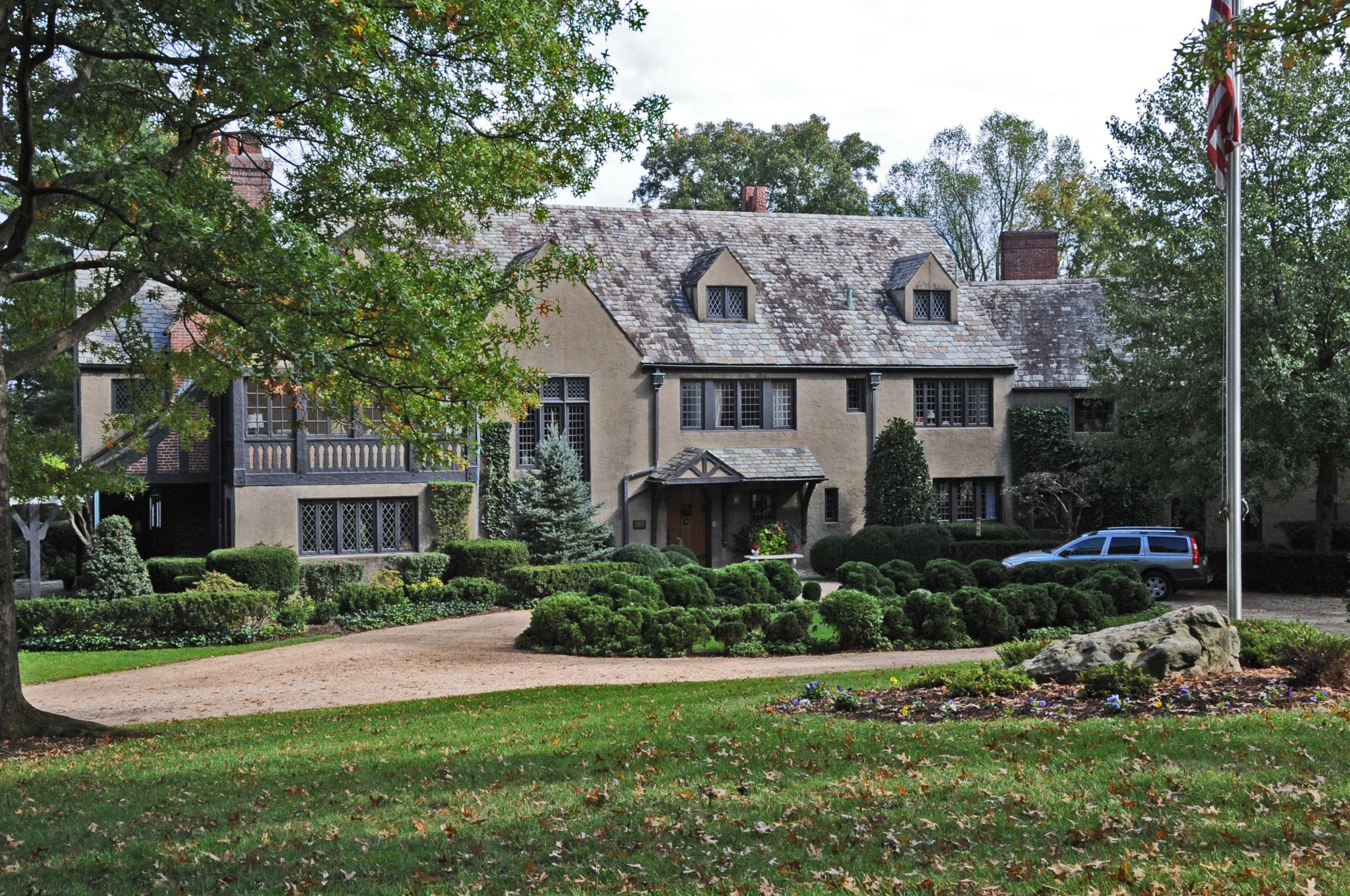

- Location within West Virginia Location within the United States
- Location: 920 Newton Rd., Charleston, West Virginia
- Coordinates: 38°20′26″N 81°38′23″W
- Area: 3.3 acres (1.3 ha)
- Built: 1921
- Architectural style: Tudor Revival, English Tudor
- MPS: South Hills MRA
- NRHP reference No.: 84000413
- Added to NRHP: October 26, 1984

Thomas-McJunkin-Love House is a historic home located at Charleston, West Virginia. It was built for James R. Thomas, president of the Carbon Fuel Company, a coal mining business in the Kanawha Valley. Known originally as "The Maples," it was built for him and his family around 1921. It is in the English Tudor style and features half timbering in some of the gables and brick in others, but the exterior is predominantly in stucco.

It was listed on the National Register of Historic Places in 1984 as part of the South Hills Multiple Resource Area.
