= Cuntry Boner =

Single by Puscifer
- Released: October 2, 2007
- Genre: Comedy rock, alternative country
- Length: 6:35
- Label: Puscifer Entertainment
- Songwriters: Chris George, Tom Morello

Puscifer singles chronology
"Cuntry Boner" (2007)	"'Don't Shoot the Messenger'" (2007)

"Cuntry Boner" is a song by Puscifer, released as the first ever commercial retail single from the act. Though released a month prior, the song is not featured on the debut album "V" Is for Vagina. It is the first song of theirs to be released that is not from a soundtrack or a remix. The single was made available for pre-order September 24, 2007 with the actual release on October 2, 2007.

== Overview ==
"Cuntry Boner" was originally a song recorded by The Electric Sheep, a punk band featuring Adam Jones and Tom Morello.

The song runs down a list of country music artists the narrator has "fucked" including Dolly Parton, Loretta Lynn, Barbara Mandrell, Minnie Pearl, Johnny Cash, The Judds, Willie Nelson, Glen Campbell, Elvis Presley, Lisa Marie Presley, Dwight Yoakam, Kenny Rogers, Randy Travis, Alabama, The Oak Ridge Boys and the cast of Hee Haw.

On December 6, 2007, Maynard James Keenan posted an update on the Puscifer website mentioning that "Cuntry Boner" had appeared at the number 10 position on the Billboard Hot 100 Singles Sales chart, as well as a number 1 ranking on the Billboard Hot Dance Singles Sales chart. As of May 2008, "Cuntry Boner" had been on the Hot 100 Singles Sales chart (which measures the popularity of music by sales of CD singles) for 23 weeks, peaking as high as number 6. A video of a live performance of "Cuntry Boner" is available on YouTube, and another at the printing office where the cover of the "Cuntry Boner" single was made.

Two remixed versions of "Cuntry Boner"—the Dirty Robot Mix and the Disco Viagra Mix—appeared on Puscifer's 2008 remix album, "V" Is for Viagra. The Remixes.

== Track listing ==
1. "Cuntry Boner" (Evil Joe Barresi Mix) (Chris George, T. Morello) – 3:56
2. "World Up My Ass" (Alan Moulder Mix) (K. Morris, R. Dowding) – 2:39

== Chart positions ==
Chart	Peak position
US Billboard Hot Singles Sales	12
