= Enemies & Immigrants =

EP by Modwheelmood
- Released: 2006
- Genres: Electro; Pop; Alternative
- Length: 25:08
- Label: Buddyhead

Modwheelmood chronology
| ? (2003) | Enemies & Immigrants (2006) | Things Will Change (2007) |

Professional ratings
Review scores
| Source | Rating |
|---|---|
| Allmusic | link |
| Pop Matters | (6/10) link |
| Pop Syndicate | link |
| Prefix Magazine | (6/10) link |

Enemies & Immigrants is an EP by American rock band Modwheelmood released in 2006 on Buddyhead Records.

== Track listing ==
1. Things Will Change - 4:08
2. Going Nowhere - 4:30
3. Delay Lama - 4:05
4. As I Stand Here - 4:21
5. Money For Good - 3:56
6. Yesterday - 4:06
