= Sarah Jones (drummer) =

English musician (born 1985)

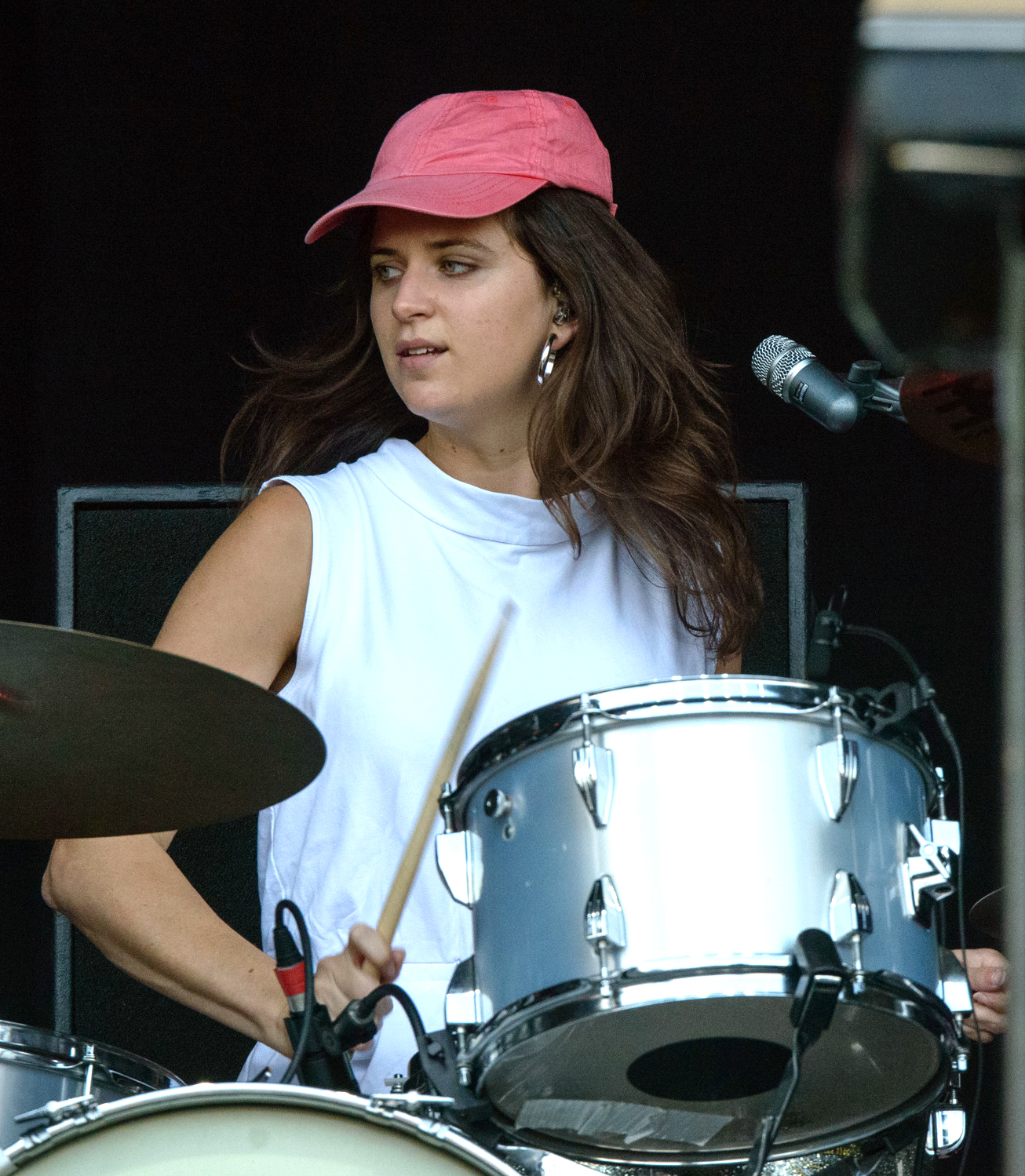
- Jones drumming with Hot Chip at Lollapalooza 2015

Background information
- Also known as: Pillow Person
- Born: 31 August 1985 (age 41); London, England
- Origin: Hereford, England
- Genres: Alternative rock; electronic; pop
- Occupations: Musician; songwriter
- Instruments: Drums; vocals
- Years active: 2000–present
- Website: pillowperson.bandcamp.com

Sarah Jones (born 31 August 1985) is an English musician based in London, best known for her work as a session and touring drummer. She is a founding member of NYPC, and has also served as a touring drummer for musicians such as Aynsley Lister, Harry Styles, Bat for Lashes, post-punk revival band Bloc Party, and synthpop band Hot Chip. Additionally, she has released several solo singles under the moniker Pillow Person. Jones has played drums on the Puscifer albums Existential Reckoning (2020) and Normal Isn’t (2026).

== Early career ==
Jones showed an interest in music from an early age. In an interview with Tom Tom Mag, she stated that she started off playing the piano, and "although [she] liked it", the piano "wasn't exactly what [she] was looking for." Jones began learning the drums after a family friend left a kit at her house, having been taught basic beats by her cousin. She also noted: "My dad had some friends who would come around and play together on the weekends. I'd sit and watch them, and soon I started joining in." Not long after, Jones began drumming in local bands and subsequently touring the UK and Europe.

== Career ==
=== Harry Styles ===
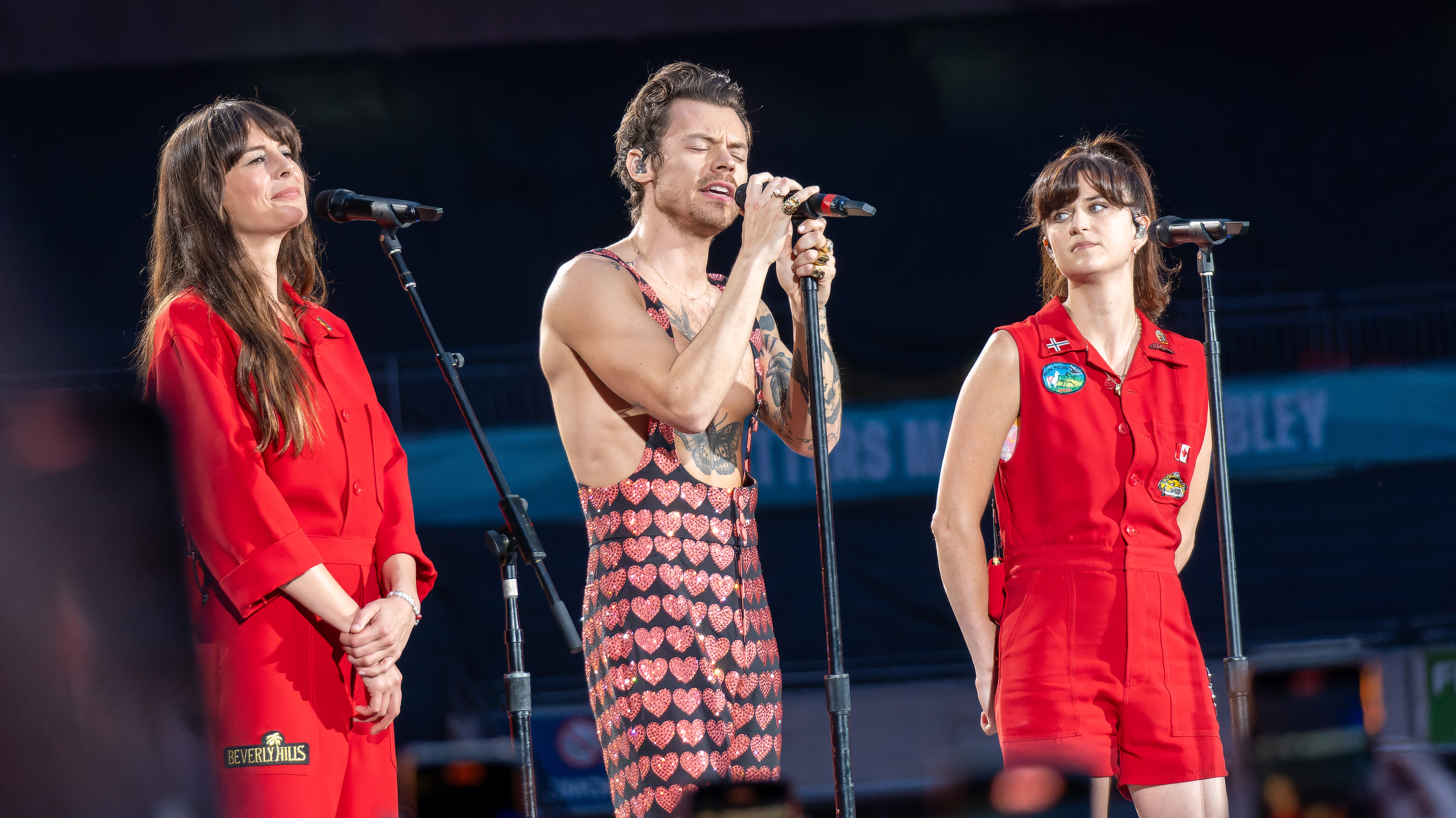
Jones (right) performing with Harry Styles at Wembley Stadium in June 2023

Jones played drums and provided backing vocals for Harry Styles's world tour, including an April 2017 performance on Saturday Night Live, playing "Sign of the Times" and "Ever Since New York".

Jones has continued as drummer for Styles following his sophomore record, Fine Line (2019), including its promotion and subsequent international Love on Tour (2020–2023).

=== Pillow Person ===
Jones has written and performed three electropop songs – "Go Ahead" (2016), "On Your Way" (2017) and "Kitchen" (2017)—under the name Pillow Person.

=== NYPC ===
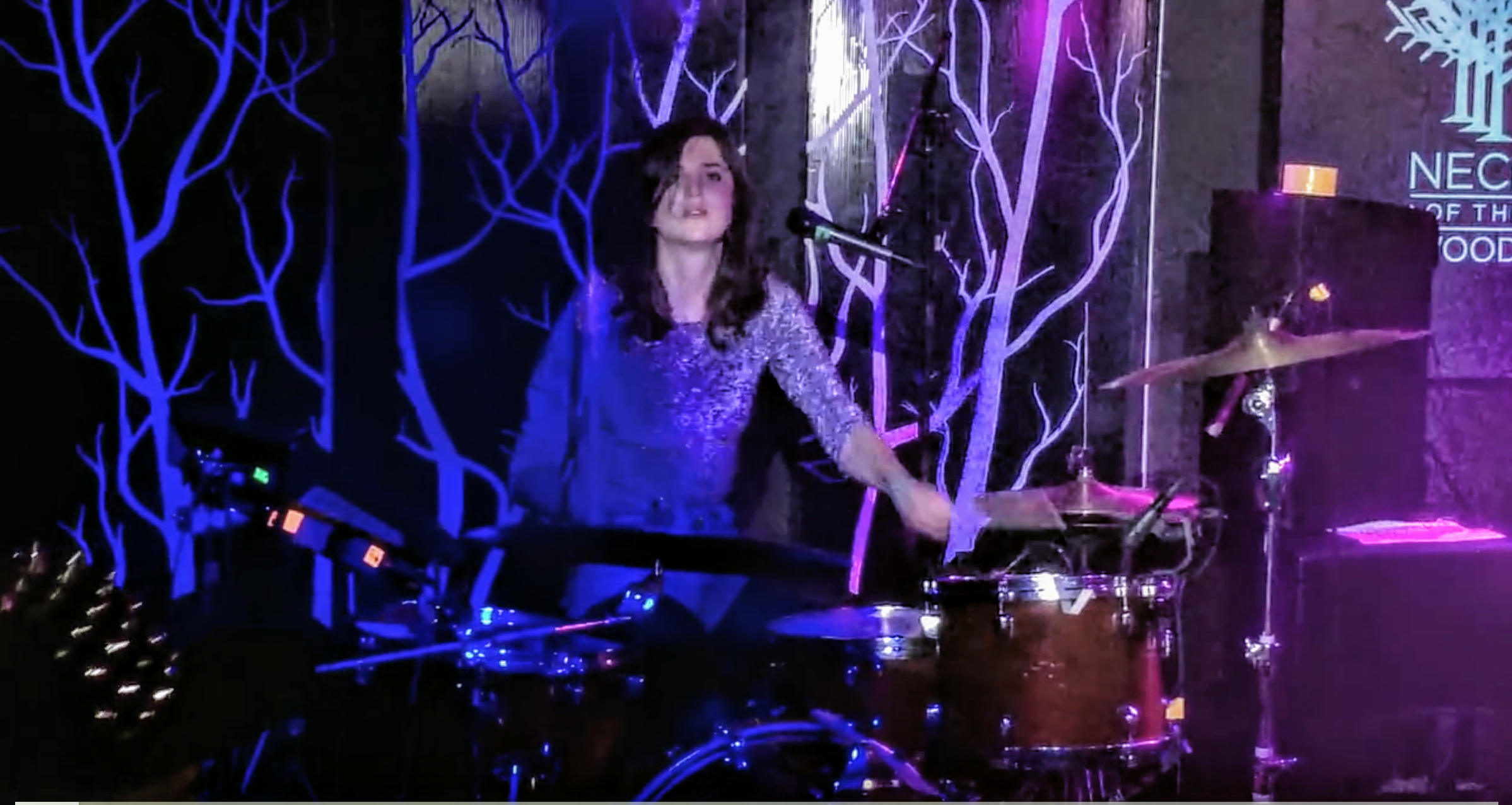
Jones performing with NYPC at Neck of the Woods, San Francisco

Jones is a member of NYPC (originally New Young Pony Club), an electronic music band that released three albums between 2007 and 2013.

== Personal life ==
Jones is married to Styles's guitarist, Mitch Rowland. In 2021, they announced they were expecting a child together.
