= Tahita Bulmer =

English singer

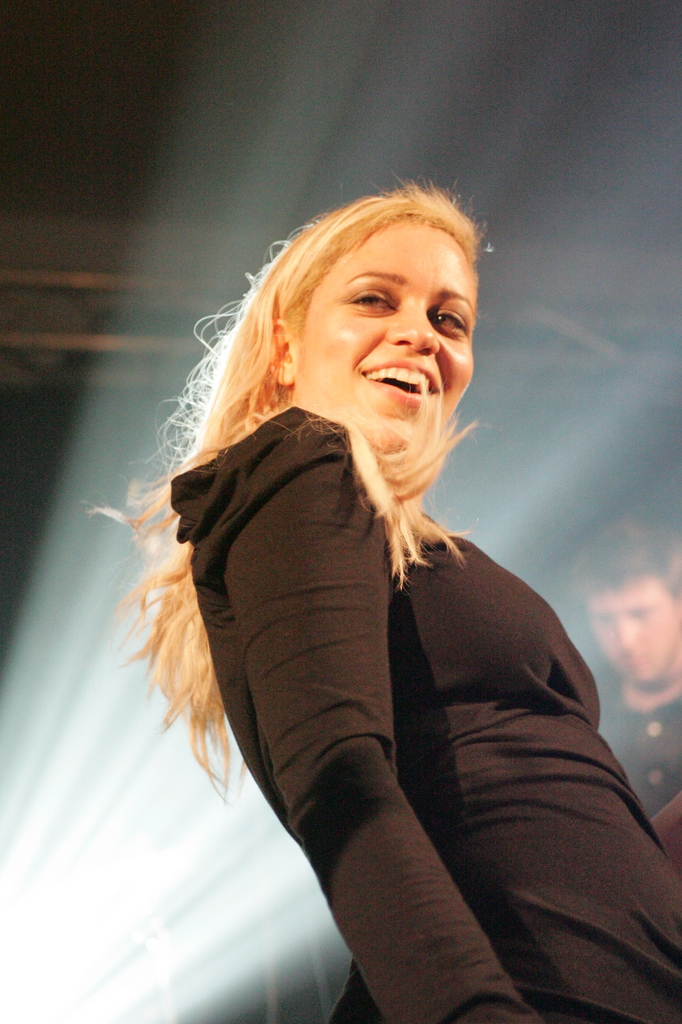
- Bulmer performing with NYPC in 2010

Background information
- Born: Tahita Rotardier Bulmer; April 29, 1976 (age 50); City of Westminster, London, England
- Genres: Post-punk revival; electropop; new rave; alternative dance
- Instrument: Vocals
- Years active: 2001—present
- Label: Modular

Tahita Rotardier Bulmer (born 29 April 1976) is an English singer. She is the lead vocalist for the English electropop band NYPC (formerly New Young Pony Club) and has previously been a member of Alphawave and Blue States.

== Biography ==
Bulmer was born in City of Westminster, London and spent her childhood living in New York, London and Cairo. She is the daughter of Rowan Bulmer, previously one of the Richmond "Faces", a fashion and music photographer much associated with the London scene of the 1960s, Ready Steady Go, and the Marquee club. Bulmer is of mixed heritage, her mother being Trinidadian and her father English.

Bulmer did not attend school at all between the ages of 8 and 13, spending that period traveling with her mother. She attended Sussex University studying Film/Media/English during which time she was in the band Alphawave. She provided vocals for the 2002 album Man Mountain by Blue States. She also co-wrote five tracks on the album, including the standout track from this album "Season Song". "Season Song" was used on the closing credits of the film 28 Days Later.

Tahita and New Young Pony Club guitarist/producer, Andy Spence, first worked together on his Organic Audio Project in 2002, writing the track "Your Day" together, before forming New Young Pony Club in 2005, having worked together on Tahita's never released solo project for several years. The breakout track "Ice Cream" came out on Tirk Recordings in 2005, initially only a release of 500 7 inches and was played on Six Music and XFM. The band signed to Island Records and released their debut album Fantastic Playroom in 2007, with second album The Optimist was released on their own label The Numbers in 2010, and third album NYPC in 2013.

According to an interview, she is a vegetarian and is a supporter of the animal rights group Viva!. In an interview with Juliet Gellatley, who is Founder and International Director of Viva!, Bulmer stated: "My diet gives me energy and when I tried giving up dairy my skin cleared up. There are definitely health advantages to being veggie."
