= Rani Sharone =

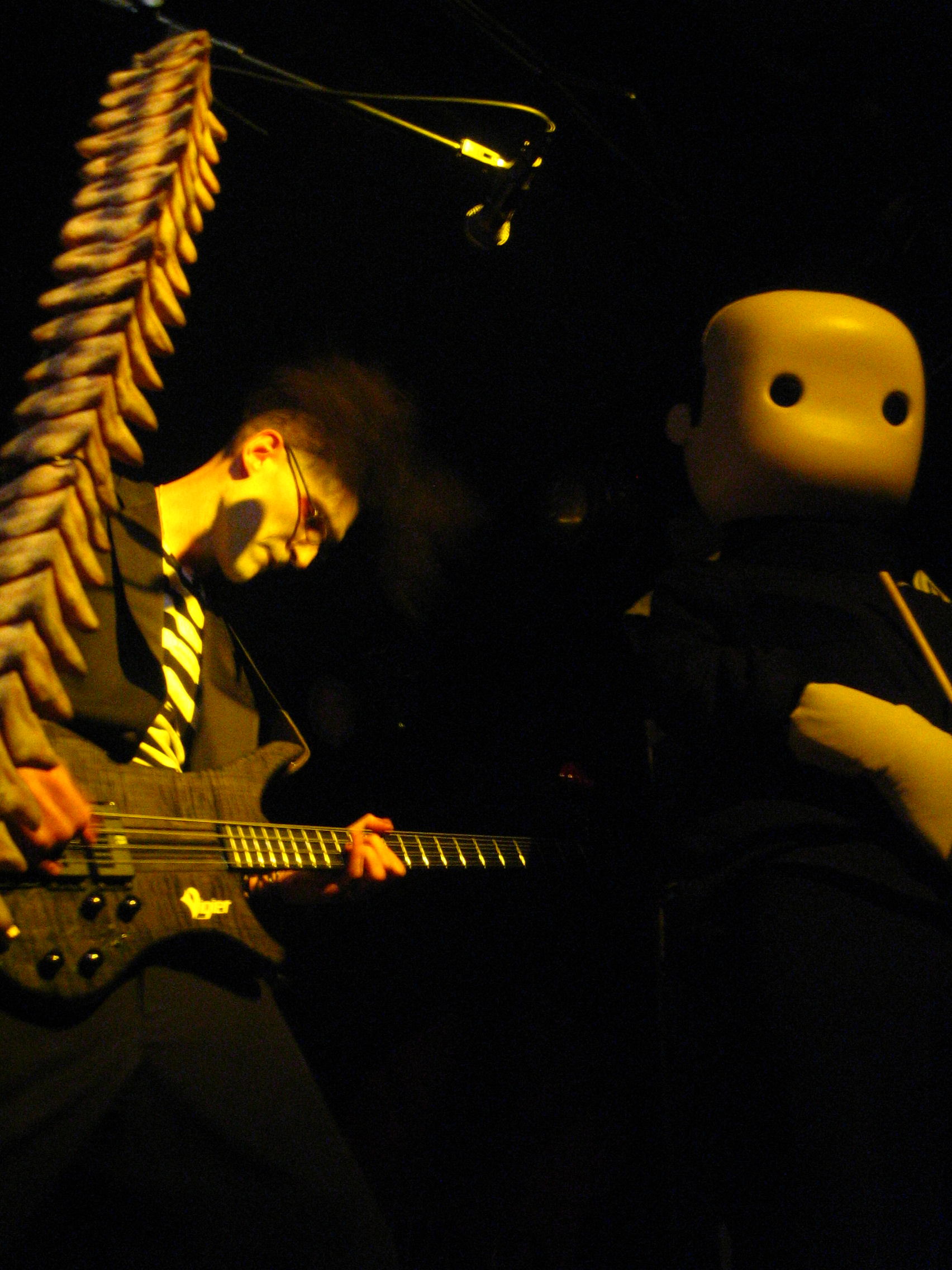
- Sharone with Stolen Babies in 2007

Background information
- Born: June 2, 1978 (age 46); Los Angeles, U.S.
- Genres: Avant garde metal; alternative metal; mathcore; art rock
- Occupation: Musician
- Instrument(s): Electric Bass, Upright Bass, electric guitar, Mandolin, Programming, Marimba, Glockenspiel

Rani Sharone (born June 2, 1978) is an American musician, who is known as the bassist/guitarist for the band Stolen Babies. He is the twin brother of drummer Gil Sharone.

In 2010, Sharone and actor Bill Moseley formed the duo Spider Mountain, and released their self titled album. Their song "Lord, Let Me Help You Decide Who to Kill" is included in the 2001 Maniacs: Field of Screams soundtrack.

In 2016, Sharone wrote the music for the film My Entire High School Sinking into the Sea.
