= Dollar and Deed =

Studio album by Hawnay Troof
- Released: May 16, 2006
- Recorded: 2004–2006
- Venue: On tour and at Club Short in North Oakland, Oakland, California
- Genre: Electronic, pop
- Length: 60:05
- Label: Retard Disco, Southern Records
- Producer: Vice Cooler

Hawnay Troof chronology
Hollar and See: The Mixtape (2006)	Dollar and Deed (2006)

Dollar and Deed is the second full-length studio album by Vice Cooler's California based solo project, Hawnay Troof. The double album was written and recorded during the Get Up! Resolution: Love worldwide tour in 2004 and 2005, and was later finished up at Cooler's home studio in Oakland. It was released through Retard Disco and Southern Records on May 16, 2006 in both CD and vinyl LP format, the latter including a deluxe 8-page photobook featuring over 200 photographs taken by Cooler during the world tour.

The album features several guest musicians: BARR, Mika Miko, Erase Errata's Jenny Hoyston, and Stereo Total's duo of Brezel Göring and Françoise Cactus.

== Track listing ==
All tracks by Vice Cooler except where noted.

=== Disc one: Dollar ===
==== Side A ====
1. "The Sad Year" – 0:17
2. "Out of Teen" – 2:08
3. "Bad News from the Stars" (Cooler, Serge Gainsbourg) – 2:15
4. "April Fools Day" – 0:14
5. "By Way of Ten" – 3:13
6. "White Men in Suits" – 1:40
7. "Daring to Dream (in Texas)" – 0:17
8. "Believe" – 2:08
9. "Grown Men Done" – 2:17
10. "Left Arm Vacant" (Cooler, Kori Gardner) – 2:26

==== Side B ====
1. "Gloria (November 16, 2004)" – 1:58
2. "U Know This" – 1:43
3. "Flowers" – 0:09
4. "Into the Definite" – 2:51
5. "Life Lived Life" – 1:31
6. "The Scab Fairy" (Soophie Nun Squad) – 1:05
7. "The Sound of Cathedral" (Cooler, Gardner) – 2:13
8. "Love 2006" – 1:02

=== Disc two: Deed ===
==== Side A ====
1. "Japan" – 0:13
2. "We R We" – 1:53
3. "People Talk" (Cooler, Devin Hoff, Redressers) – 2:23
4. "Pencils" – 2:23
5. "Never End" – 2:37
6. "Expectations and Delivery" (Cooler, Brendan Fowler) – 4:02
7. "Spirit Eternal" – 0:40
8. "Man on My Back" – 1:32
9. "Infinity" – 2:21

==== Side B ====
1. "July 15, 2004" – 0:14
2. "Open Letter: The Neverending Route" – 1:46
3. "Passion Developed from Desperation" – 2:12
4. "The Sound of Divorce" – 0:29
5. "Care" – 2:45
6. "No Longer Youth" – 1:38
7. "Triumph" – 3:31

== Personnel ==
- BARR – Performer
- Françoise Cactus – vocals
- George Chen – vocals, drawing
- Thomas DiMuzio – mastering
- Brendan Fowler – arranger
- Kori Gardner – organ
- Brezel Göring – arranger, vocals
- Devin Hoff – orchestration
- Jenny Hoyston – vocals
- Jason Miller – vocals
