= Holland Andrews =

American musician

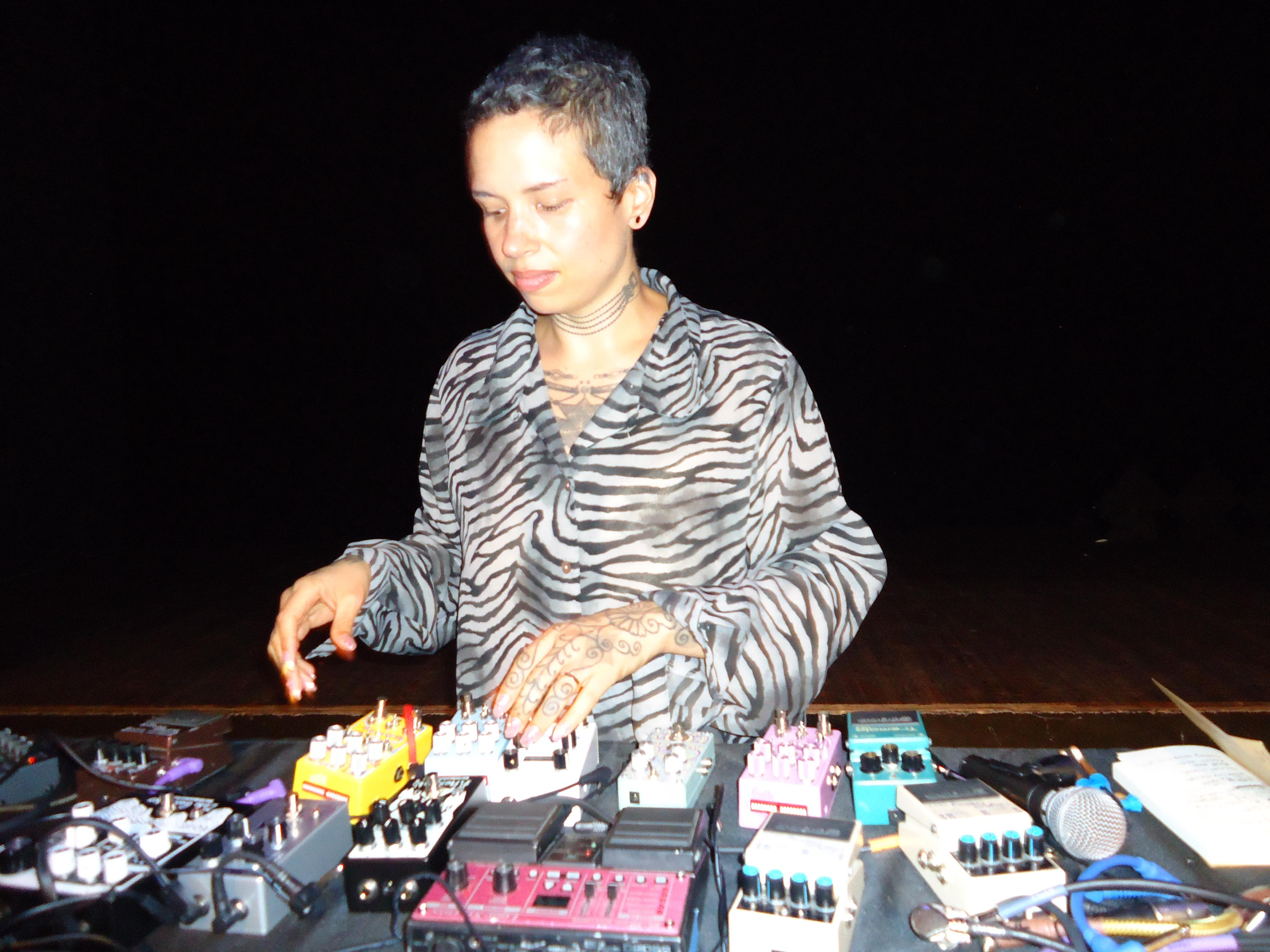
- Holland Andrews performing at Roulette Intermedium in 2025

Background information
- Also known as: Like A Villain
- Born: November 3, 1988 (age 37)
- Genres: avant-garde music, experimental music
- Occupations: Composer, vocalist, performance artist, clarinetist
- Years active: 2008–present
- Website: hollandandrews.com

Holland Andrews is an American singer, composer, performance artist, and clarinetist. A solo artist who has previously performed under the name Like A Villain, their style of music draws from contemporary opera, musical theater, jazz, ambient and noise music. They also compose music for dance, theater, and film.

Known for their long, improvised live sets and cinematic music, Andrews's albums are The Life of a Gentleman (2010), Bast (2014), and What Makes Vulnerability Good (2019). They have been reviewed in The Wire, the New York Times, Le Monde, La Repubblica, the Financial Times, the New Yorker, Electronic Sound, Uncut, and BBC Radio.

In 2025, Andrews was announced as a Guggenheim Fellow.

== Early life ==
Born in 1988 and raised in Los Angeles, California, Holland Andrews comes from a family of singers that included their mother, sisters, and cousins. Their mother and sister released the songs "What's Your Game" and "Running and Pushing" as the group MDLT Willis. The quietest voice in the tightly knit group, Andrews also attended musical theater camp with one of their sisters.

Andrews' mother was troubled, suffering from schizoaffective disorder, as well as alcohol and drug abuse. When they were 3 years old, their mother's boyfriend tried to drown them, and as a result, their mother lost custody of them. Andrews moved to Irvine, California to live with their father. Their parents had been divorced for several years, when, at 16, their mother committed suicide. At that point Andrews checked themself into rehab.

== Music career ==
After visiting a friend there, Andrews moved to Portland, Oregon at 19, and joined the music community, playing clarinet and singing in the indie-folk bands Meyercord and The Ocean Floor. They began to perform as a solo artist, drawing on their childhood for their improvised music.

Under the moniker Like A Villain, their first album, The Life of a Gentleman, was self-released in 2010. Willamette Week described the music as "wall after wall of sound in choral blasts before switching to light, playful clarinet and snippets of spoken word."

In 2013, they began a residency to create a musical piece for the avant-garde Time-Based Art Festival, administered by the Portland Institute For Contemporary Art (PICA). In 2014, Andrews' house was robbed, including a computer with some of their early songs. However, they were able to still independently release a second album of music, called Bast, that they recorded with Mike Erwin, and members of Typhoon, the Ocean Floor, Machinedrum, and others.

Two years later, Andrews secured a Creative Exchange Lab residency at PICA. There, they met Rwandan-born singer-songwriter and choreographer Dorothee Munyaneza, who they would eventually begin a collaboration. That same year, Andrews performed as part of a septet of artists in the Portland Jazz Composer's Ensemble. Their music and visual graphics focused on their work about trauma, and healing by music. The group featured Andrews as composer and vocalist; Douglas Detrick, trumpet and music director; Reed Wallsmith, alto saxophone; Ian Christensen, tenor saxophone; Lars Campbell, trombone; Jon Shaw, bass; and Ken Ollis, drums. They toured internationally for two years.

After another performance in the Time-Based Art Festival, Andrews—again as Like A Villain—recorded their third album, What Makes Vulnerability Good at Color Therapy Recording Studio in Portland with Arjan Miranda: The songs germinated from processing their mother's suicide note in 2015. Bandcamp's Casey Jarman wrote "These profoundly intimate glimpses at personal trauma round out Andrews's experimental spirit with something real, albeit gutwrenching."

Andrews moved to New York City to participate in the ISSUE Project Room 2020 residency program. What Makes Vulnerability Good was released September 2019 on Accidental Records. "We were thinking of ways that transform and keep the listener interested without sacrificing who I am as an artist," they said about the use of synthesizer effects with arrangements that included guests like saxophonist Joe Cunningham (Blue Cranes). Lyrically, Andrews expounded on the relationship they had with their mother, among other personal topics.

In January 2021, under their own name for the first time, Andrews released under the Berlin-based record label Leiter Verlag, founded by Felix Grimm and Nils Frahm, the single and video for "Gloss", followed by the Wordless EP in February, which they wrote, produced and mixed themselves. To keep connected to fans during the isolation of the COVID-19 pandemic around the same period, they created There You Are, a series of "microperformances" for their fans via phone. There You Are was created as Andrews's final work for their artist residency at ISSUE Project Room to supplement the online performances. These personalized performances were later a part of Darkness Sounding, a music festival organized by the Los Angeles ensemble, Wild Up. That year, Andrews also composed music for the documentary Beba.

In May 2023, Andrews presented work at the Virginia Commonwealth University's Institute for Contemporary Art. That same month they collaborated with Demian Dinéyazhi' in a closing performance for Dinéyazhi's exhibition "An Infected Sunset" at Los Angeles Contemporary Exhibitions (LACE) in Los Angeles.

In addition, Andrews has collaborated with the experimental music project Son Lux (as a featured artist on the track “Sever”), William Brittelle, Christina Vantzou, Ryan Lott, West Dylan Thordson, and Peter Broderick.

== Theater, film, and dance ==
Andrews created music and performed in a collaboration with Rwandan-born singer/dancer/choreographer and refugee Dorothée Munyaneza called Unwanted. The work, set to electronic music by Alain Mahé, had its U.S. premiere in 2017 at Baryshnikov Arts Center in New York City, and was created from stories from Rwandan refugees and refugees from the Congo and other countries. These were stories of sexual violence used as a tool of warfare told by women who survived genocide in their countries. The piece was performed in October 2018 at Chicago's Museum of Contemporary Art.

In 2018, Andrews performed as one of the vocalists in Gabriel Kahane’s Emergency Shelter Intake Form, a live piece of 13 vignettes with full orchestra that premiered at the Oregon Symphony. The concert, themed around homelessness, was performed at the Jay Pritzker Pavilion in Millennium Park in Chicago the following year.

Andrews created the music soundtrack for the 2019 documentary, Zero Impunity by Nicolas Blies and Stéphane Hueber-Blies, a film that presented incidents of sexual violence in armed conflicts around the world. In September 2020, they along with other experimental musicians Justin Hicks and Alicia Hall Moran, provided the soundtrack for Lee Mingwei’s meditative performance installation, Our Labyrinth, at New York's Metropolitan Museum of Art. Choreographed by Bill T. Jones, their music accompanied various dancers as they swept mounds of rice around the floor in 90-minute intervals. That year, Andrews scored the music for Jones’ Afterwardsness dance piece, which was filmed at New York's Park Avenue Armory to lobby the New York state government for special permission to present reduced-capacity, socially-distanced performances due to COVID-19.

Andrews's collaborative work with dance and theater artists includes Outwalkers by Moya Michael in 2022 and Is It Thursday Yet? by Jenn Freeman and Sonya Tayeh in 2023. In April 2023, Andrews took part in the filming of a rehearsal with four other Black performers for choreographer and artist Will Rawls's video work [siccer], shown at the Museum of Contemporary Art Chicago.

== Personal life ==
Andrews is based in Brooklyn and uses they/them pronouns.

In 2014, Andrews' house was robbed, including a computer with some of their early songs.
