= Hawnay Troof =

American electronic indie band

- Origin: Oakland, California, U.S.
- Genres: Electronic, indie
- Years active: 2001–2012
- Labels: Retard Disco, Southern Records
- Members: Vice Cooler
- Website: www.hawnaytroof.com

Hawnay Troof is an American electronic indie band formed in late 2001.

Despite the band's American punk and electronic background, many elements of pop, dance-punk, electronica, soul, noise music and club. have been incorporated into its sound.

== History ==
=== Origins ===
The band began when Vice Cooler and friend posed as a band and performed a guerilla-style set during a show. Despite having played only a handful of shows, he was invited to play similar guerilla-style sets opening for the likes of Quintron and Miss Pussycat, Coachwhips, Glass Candy, Lightning Bolt, Bratmobile, Gravy Train!!!!, and Stereo Total.

Eventually Cooler relocated to Oakland, California and continued to perform. He became friends with Drew Daniel (of Soft Pink Truth and Matmos), Allison Wolfe, and Jenny Hoyston; all of whom would appear later on future live performances and/ or recordings. He signed to Retard Disco who released the 2003 debut Get Up: Resolution Love!. The band toured first shows in Iceland, Australia, New Zealand, and Europe with The Gossip. The "Man On My Back" single was released during the gour, surprising everyone with a harsher, more evolved sound. The band performed in their underwear. The absence of clothing was meant "be this liberating thing for people to see."

=== Dollar and Deed and Community ===
Cooler recorded from January to March 2005. Jenny Hoyston was a collaborator. Others who worked on the record were Stereo Total, Barr, and Kori Gardner of Mates of State and John Dieterich.

Dollar and Deed was released in April 2006. The EP Community followed.

After the 20-month "Dollar and Deed" tour, Hawnay Troof played shows in Egypt, China, and Europe.

=== Islands of Ayle ===
Islands of Ayle was finished between December 2007 and March 2008. Three of the album's songs, "Front My Hope", "Venus Venus Piper", and "Water" were collaborations between Vice and Bretzel Goring of Stereo Total through email. Many other tracks were created with collaborators via email.

Cooler has said that the goal for Islands of Ayle was to create a pop record, but that it ended up accidentally "damaged".

The album was mixed Vice Cooler and Greg Saunier and was released on September 9, 2008. The first edition of the CD came with an extra disc of remixes and a limited edition o-card cover.

The album's release came with a world tour opening for Deerhoof, High Places, Telepathe and Matt And Kim, which had the band spanning the same area as the previous 20-month tour over the last four months of 2008.

October marked the release of his free, fan remixed record Remix Projection and also brought Hawnay Troof on its second tour of Australia and New Zealand. This time it was a tour with Peaches and later as a part of Australia's largest traveling electronic festival Parklife. During this time, Peaches started performing randomly with Hawnay Troof as a guest back up singer into December 2008. Shortly after the band surprised the crowd at Austin's Fun Fun Fun Fest with a very memorable set, which including Vice making use of the outside stage by incorporating the ceiling and trees by climbing them throughout his set, and jumping off, working the crowd into a frenzy.

Unlike Dollar and Deed, Islands of Ayle was released to great acclaim. Pitchfork rated it with a 7.5 and described Vice as "[leaving] an impression of a confidence that has moved beyond the ego and into a territory that enables him to get away with just about anything" while Spin magazine said that the album is "...a bewilderingly awesome musical gumbo. Both confrontational and congregational, Troof's beat-driven, stutter-filled jams will move your feet the way they were meant to move – with wild abandon and reckless intent." Mae Shi and High Places named it as one of the best albums of 2008 while electronic heavyweights Ladytron called it one of their top ten records of the year in Filter magazine.

== Discography ==
=== Albums ===
- Get Up! Resolution Love (Retard Disco/ TCWTGA (LP), 2003)
- Dollar and Deed (Retard Disco/ Southern, 2006)
- Islands of Ayle (Retard Disco/ Southern, 2008)
- Remix Projection (Self Released Free Download, 2008)
- Daggers at the Moon (Retard Disco, 2009)

=== EPs and singles ===
- Who Likes Ta? (as Da Hawnway Troof, Retard Disco, 2003)
- White Men in Suits EP (Deleted Art, 2004)
- Community (Retard Disco, 2005)
- "Hollar and See" (Self Released, 2006)
- "RMX: 2008" (Self Released, 2008)

=== Remixes ===
- High Places (Headspins)
- No Age (Everybody's Down)
- Yacht (It's Coming To Get You)
- Jaguar Love (Humans Evolve Into Skyscrapers)
- Jaguar Love (My Organ Sounds Like...)
- The Ssion (Street Jizz)
- Joanna Newsom (Bridges And Balloons)
- Barr (Half Of Two Times Two)
- Telepathe (Chromes On It)
- Simo Soo (Bike City)

== Awards ==
- "Connection" as #2 indie video of the year (MTV2, 2008).
- "Connection" as #1 video on MTVU (MTVU, 2009).

== Trivia ==
- Solange Knowles praised his fashion and music on her Twitter.
- Hawnay Troof has been invited to play such countries as Iceland, Egypt, New Zealand and Australia.
- Vice Cooler was a guest speaker at the Peaches and John Waters 2005 Christmas show at UCLA.
- In 2007, Henry Rollins said on his radio show, Harmony In My Head, that "I have always admired people who are all the way into their work to the point where the separation between the art and the artist disappears. Most never even get close..." when talking about Vice Cooler and Hawnay Troof.
