= Haunts (album) =

Studio album by Bark Bark Bark
- Released: May 22, 2007
- Recorded: 2004–2007
- Genre: Indie rock, electronica
- Length: 36:37
- Label: Retard Disco, Southern Records
- Producer: Jacob Cooper

Bark Bark Bark chronology
Hott Summer Traxx (2006)	Haunts (2007)

Professional ratings
Review scores
Source	Rating
Allmusic	link
Kerrang!	2/5 stars

Haunts is the debut album by the Arizona-based indie rock project, Bark Bark Bark. It was released through Retard Disco and Southern Records on May 22, 2007.

== Track listing ==
All songs were written by Jacob Cooper, except where noted.

1. "Brand New Shoes" – 1:52
2. "Haunts" – 3:06
3. "Some Time" – 2:42
4. "One Thing Stands" (Jacob Cooper, Michael Fay) – 3:28
5. "Tattoos" (Cooper, Fay) – 2:56
6. "New Kids on the Block" – 3:06
7. "I'm Needy" – 2:35
8. "GTFO" – 2:23
9. "Pluto Never Forget" – 1:44
10. "I Love You but I Don't" (Cooper, Fay) – 3:56
11. "Heart" – 2:26
12. "How to Save a Whale" – 1:31
13. "Dead Ghost" – 2:03
14. "You Could Swim" – 2:47

== Personnel ==
- Jacob Cooper – vocals, sequencing, guitar, drums
- Johnnie Munger – sequencing, backing vocals
- Michael Sanger – backing vocals
- Ashley Thomas – backing vocals
