= Long Weekend =

In most English-speaking countries, a long weekend is a three or four day weekend.

Long Weekend may also refer to:

== Film and television ==
- The Long Weekend, a 2005 Canadian film starring Chris Klein and Brendan Fehr
- Long Weekend (1978 film), an Australian horror film
  - Long Weekend (2008 film), an Australian remake of the 1978 film
- "The Long Weekend" (American Dragon: Jake Long), an episode of American Dragon: Jake Long
- "Long Weekend" (Mad Men), an episode of Mad Men
- The Long Weekend (O' Despair), a 1989 film directed by Gregg Araki
- Long Weekend (2021 film), an American film directed by Steven Basilone

== Literature ==
- The Long Week-End, a 1940 social history of Britain between the World Wars, by Robert Graves and Alan Hodge

== See also ==
- Interwar period, the period between the end of World War I and the beginning of World War II in Europe (1918–1939)
- The Lost Weekend (disambiguation)
