= Street Punk (album) =

Studio album by Hunx and His Punx
- Released: July 2, 2013
- Genre: Hardcore punk, street punk
- Length: 20:11
- Label: Hardly Art

Hunx and His Punx chronology
Too Young to Be in Love (2011)	Street Punk (2013)

Professional ratings
Aggregate scores
Source	Rating
Metacritic	79/100
Review scores
Source	Rating
AllMusic	4/5 stars
Consequence of Sound	3/5 stars
Pitchfork	7.4/10

Street Punk is the second studio album from American punk rock band Hunx and His Punx. It was released in July 2013 under Hardly Art Records.

== Track listing ==
All tracks are written by Shannon Shaw, except where noted.

No.	Title	Writer(s)	Length
1.	"Bad Skin"	Seth Bogart	1:24
2.	"Everyone's a Pussy"		0:31
3.	"You Think You're Tough"		1:34
4.	"Born Blonde"	Bogart	2:02
5.	"I'm Coming Back"		1:44
6.	"Mud in Your Eyes"		1:56
7.	"Street Punk"	Bogart	1:33
8.	"Don't Call Me Fabulous"		0:27
9.	"Rat Bag"	Bogart	1:56
10.	"Egg Raid on Mojo"	Beastie Boys	1:26
11.	"Kill Elaine"	Erin Emslie	1:51
12.	"It's Not Easy"		3:47
