= Other Animals =

Studio album by Erase Errata
- Released: October 2, 2001
- Recorded: April 2001
- Genre: Indie rock
- Length: 29:47
- Labels: (United States) Troubleman Unlimited (United Kingdom) Tsk! Tsk! Records (2002 release); Blast First (2003 reissue)
- Producers: Colin Dupuis, Norm Druce

Erase Errata chronology
Other Animals (2001)	At Crystal Palace (2003)

Professional ratings
Review scores
Source	Rating
AllMusic	4.5/5 stars
Pitchfork Media	7.9/10

Other Animals is the first studio album by the band Erase Errata, released in 2001.

== Track listing ==
1. "Tongue Tied" – 1:41
2. "Billy Mummy" – 1:44
3. "Delivery" – 1:41
4. "1 Minute" – :48
5. "Marathon" – 2:55
6. "Other Animals Are #1" – 2:11
7. "High Society" – 2:27
8. "..." – :53
9. "French Canadia" – 2:17
10. "How to Tell Yourself from a Television" – 2:04
11. "Fault List" – 2:20
12. "C. Rex" – 1:42
13. "Walk Don't Fly" – 2:15
14. "Dexterity Is # 2" – 2:10
15. "---" – 2:30

== Personnel ==
- Jenny Hoyston – vocals, trumpet
- Ellie Erickson – bass
- Bianca Sparta – drums
- Sara Jaffe – guitar
- Colin Dupuis – additional percussion
