= Nightlife (Erase Errata album) =

Studio album by Erase Errata
- Released: July 25, 2006
- Recorded: 2006
- Genre: Indie rock
- Length: 30:19
- Label: Kill Rock Stars
- Producer: Chris Woodhouse and Eli Crews

Erase Errata chronology
At Crystal Palace (2003)	Nightlife (2006)	Lost Weekend (2016)

Professional ratings
Aggregate scores
Source	Rating
Metacritic	73/100
Review scores
Source	Rating
AllMusic	4/5 stars
Pitchfork Media	7.9/10

Nightlife is the third studio album by the band Erase Errata, released in 2006 on Kill Rock Stars, and the first not to feature Sara Jaffe. The album also marked the first time they made an official music video, for "Tax Dollar." directed by Jeremy Solterbeck.

== Track listing ==
1. "Cruising" - 2:42
2. "Hotel Suicide" - 3:20
3. "Another Genius Idea from Our Government" - 1:59
4. "Take You" - 1:58
5. "Dust" - 2:30
6. "Tax Dollar" - 2:28
7. "Rider" - 3:56
8. "Beacon" - 1:55
9. "He Wants What's Mine" - 1:29
10. "Giant Hans" - 2:48
11. "Wasteland (In A...)" - 3:13
12. "Nightlife" - 1:52

== Personnel ==
- Jenny Hoyston – vocals, guitar, trumpet
- Ellie Erickson – bass
- Bianca Sparta – drums
