= At Crystal Palace =

Studio album by Erase Errata
- Released: October 28, 2003
- Recorded: January 2003
- Genre: Post-punk; avant-pop; punk rock; no wave
- Length: 27:34
- Label: (United States) Troubleman Unlimited (United Kingdom) Blast First
- Producer: Jay Pellicci, Aaron Prellwity

Erase Errata chronology
Other Animals (2001)	At Crystal Palace (2003)	Nightlife (2006)

Professional ratings
Aggregate scores
Source	Rating
Metacritic	73/100
Review scores
Source	Rating
AllMusic	4/5 stars
Pitchfork	7.6/10

At Crystal Palace is the second studio album by the band Erase Errata, released in 2003.

== Track listing ==
1. "Driving Test – 1:39
2. "Ca. Viewing" – 2:53
3. "Go to Sleep" – 1:56
4. "Retreat! The Most Familiar" – 2:25
5. "Surprise, It's Easter" – 1:33
6. "Let's Be Active C/O Club Hott" – 2:52
7. "Flippy Flop" – :56
8. "Owls" – 2:20
9. "Ease on Over" – 1:52
10. "The White Horse Is Bucking" – 1:20
11. "A Thief Detests the Criminal, Elements of the Ruling Class" – 2:11
12. "Harvester" – 1:22
13. "Matter No Medley" – 4:07

== Personnel ==
- Jenny Hoyston – vocals, trumpet
- Ellie Erickson – bass
- Bianca Sparta – drums
- Sara Jaffe – guitar
- Maya – recorder
