= The Moggs =

US musical group

- Origin: San Francisco Bay Area
- Genres: Indie rock
- Years active: 1995–present
- Label: Ausgang
- Members: Justin "Sir Plus" Millar; Cara "Miss Minor" LP
- Website: www.moggs.com

The Moggs are an indie rock band from the San Francisco Bay Area of the United States comprising Justin Millar (aka Sir Plus) and Cara LP (aka Miss Minor).

== History ==
The duo met while auditioning for a Calvin Klein underwear commercial in 1995. Sir Plus plays guitar and Miss Minor plays drums, both contributing vocals.

The band's album The White Belt Is Not Enough was recorded at a Victorian house in Petaluma on vintage analog equipment and mastered at Abbey Road Studios, and released in 2005 to positive reviews, with a US tour following.

The band's music has been described as indie rock and "garagey and primal and minimalist". Comparisons have been drawn with Sonic Youth, Polvo, Blonde Redhead, and Erase Errata.

== Discography ==
=== Albums ===
- The White Belt is Not Enough (2005), Ausgang/Absolutely Kosher

=== EPs ===
- Amulat EP (2008), Ausgang

=== Singles ===
- "Evening Shadows" (2010), Pandacide - split with Santiago
