= Seth Bogart (album) =

Studio album by Seth Bogart
- Released: February 19, 2016
- Recorded: 2012–15
- Length: 44:01
- Label: Burger
- Producer: Cole MGN

Seth Bogart chronology
Hairdresser Blues (2012)	Seth Bogart (2016)

Singles from Seth Bogart
- 1. "Eating Makeup" Released: November 2, 2015; 2. "Forgotten Fantazy" Released: January 6, 2016; 3. "Plastic!" Released: January 27, 2016

Seth Bogart is the second overall solo studio album written, recorded and performed by Hunx and His Punx vocalist Seth Bogart. It is the first studio album to be released under his name, as his previous solo record Hairdresser Blues was issued under his stage name Hunx. Seth Bogart was produced and co-written by Cole MGN, and also features vocal performances from Chela, Kathleen Hanna, Tavi Gevinson, Jeremiah Nadya, and Clementine Creevy.

Bogart had enjoyed making music as his Hunx character, but had wanted for a long time to start recording material that showed more of his true self, "like a weird teenager's version of an adult album, I guess. But I just mean that in the sense where I took it super seriously and worked on it for a long time" because "I wanted to make something that I would look back and still really love later." He took more than two years to make the album, unlike during his Hunx period where he would make a record in five days or fewer.

Seth Bogart was promoted with an art show, videos and a tour that contained props inspired by Pee-wee's Playhouse, as well as numerous pre-album song premieres. Upon its February 2016 Burger Records release, the album was praised by some reviewers for its concept of fakeness of apparent beauty in celebrity and fashion culture, as symbolized in its use of cheap keyboard sounds and vocal effects such as autotune. There were also critics that complimented its combination of elements of punk and pop music and liked it as being a fun record.

== Background and composition ==
Bogart started making all of the songs in his bedroom with only a guitar, a $50 keyboard and laptop before sending them to Cole MGN, well known for his work with other artists such as Ariel Pink, Julia Holter, and Dâm-Funk, for them to be finished. Bogart often met him since the mid-2000s in Oakland, California until Cole moved to Los Angeles. Bogart did not move to the city, given that he had to stay in Oakland to run a hair salon, until 2012, which the two met up again to record demos that would be finalized for the album: "I really can't find words to describe how much I love collaborating with him. He's such a great artist, musician and producer and puts everything he has into whatever he's working on. There was basically nothing challenging about making this record. It just always felt right." The album features collaborations with singers including Chela and Kathleen Hanna, who both sent their recorded vocal tracks, as well as Clementine Creevy and Tavi Gevinson whose vocals were recorded in the studio; Bogart said that he considered 20 people to collaborate with for the album.

As symbolized musically with low-grade keyboard sounds, as well as exaggerated autotuned vocals, Seth Bogart is about the culture of fabricated fashion and celebrities, and combines them with reality to show how the seeming beauty of these things are actually dull. Musically, the album uses the sound of the early 2000s period of DIY punk acts such as Le Tigre and Tracy + the Plastics, and makes it goofy enough so it still can be taken seriously at the same time by adding bright electronic sounds and effects common in pop music to the mix.

== Track information ==
Seth Bogart opens with the lo-fi "Hollywood Squares", which laments the honoring and social climbing of celebrities in Los Angeles. It contains distorted guitars, basic drum rhythms and tongue-in-cheek lyrical content, with the song compared by one reviewer to a more "produced" Japandroids track. "Eating Makeup" was inspired by an episode of the TLC series My Strange Addiction, which contained a testimony by a woman named Brittoni who described eating makeup as "craving of your favorite kind of candy bar." As a reviewer described "Eating Makeup": "What begins as a lick or a curiosity turns into a full-blown obsession, and all of a sudden, you're sprawled in the center of Sephora, covered in opened concealer. Eventually, Bogart concludes gleefully, 'everybody's eating makeup'".

"Forgotten Fantazy" deals with how someone's own true personality is removed by another person's vision about what a perfect lover should be: "It's hard for me to know what you need/ I'm your forgotten fantazy." It is instrumentally driven by a restrained synthesizer line that, according to Jeremy Gordon of Pitchfork, may have been taken from a loading screen of an old NES game. Bogart described the lyrical content in a magazine interview: "When it comes down to it, Forgotten Fantazy is a song about S&M. It's about non-satisfaction. Un-satisfaction. Satisfaction going out of style. Nothing ever being enough. The possible pleasures that control your sex drive no matter how bad you try to resist. Being tied up and disconnecting from reality. Confusing pain and pleasure, and pleasure and pain. It's a love song." The song is followed in the album's track listing by "Smash the TV", which is about the narrator's attraction to someone he only sees on a television show. As MTV News wrote, the album "puts kitsch and queerness at the fore" with songs like the R&B ballad "Lubed", which includes instruments such as a mesmeric synthesizer riff playing over a piano and "melodic distortions". Described by Bogart as "the most Radio Disney song I’ve ever written", "Club With Me" involves the narrator dancing by himself at a club with a song he wrote himself playing.

Bogart cited his "plastic obsession" towards Plastic Bertrand, as well as groups including Plastics, The Plastics group in the 2004 film Mean Girls, Yoko Ono/Plastic Ono Band, the Aqua song "Barbie Girl" and the group Tracy + the Plastics as inspiration for "Plastic!". In the song, the narrator deals with him seeing potential in a lost friend of his who becomes briefly famous in public and now becomes crazy in seeking for more of this popularity. "Plastic!" is followed by the doo-wop track "Barely 21". Containing vocals from Gevinson, it is about having a crush on someone who has just turned twenty-one years of age, hence the title, and musically has "a nice digital gloss to it, as well as some tender guitar hooks" as a reviewer for Exclaim! wrote. The "slinky disco" track "Supermarket Supermodel" is followed by "Flurt"; an upbeat song on the outside, "Flurt" is brightly sung by Chela who reflects if going out to a club with intentions for only having a private moment was really a good idea, which according to Gordon, juxtaposes against Chela's hidden sorrow.

== Release and promotion ==
Professional ratings
Aggregate scores
Source	Rating
Metacritic	81/100
Review scores
Source	Rating
AllMusic	4/5 stars
Exclaim!	6/10
Loud and Quiet	6/10
Now	4/5 stars
Pitchfork	8/10
Spectrum Culture	3.5/5 stars
Spin	8/10

When planning how he would tour in promotion of the album, Bogart garnered the inspiration from Le Tigre to have a video play behind him for it to be played for each song so the audience could walk into his own world: "I love their music, but what I loved most is that they would have video components to their shows that made things so much more exciting; you could really see them more as artists as well." Bogart considered it lame to try to keep sticking to only one form of art, so he decided to make large sculptures and props for the videos that were based on the album. These videos include fake advertisements for products like "Mantyhose", pantyhose for male, with large replicas of legs and a pantyhose container; the props used in the videos were also used on stage. He also added other sculptures and paintings that were not inspired from songs from the album to make the scenery "overwhelming rather than going into a white-walled gallery where you look at three things." All of the props were majorly influenced by the show Pee-wee's Playhouse. Bogart then decided to use the props and sculptures that were in the videos and on his yet-to-be-started tour to make his first solo art show that opened at 356 Mission in Los Angeles on September 3, 2015. Bogart had a European tour from May 12 to May 20, 2016, in promotion for the record.

Bogart first revealed details about the album in an October 2, 2015 interview with the magazine i-D. "Eating Makeup" was its lead single, which was released on November 2, 2015, with the album's Burger Records February 19, 2016 release date also announced. On November 10, the official video for the song premiered on the official site for The Fader. Directed by JJ Stratford of Telefantasy Studios, the video takes place in a colorful, energetic house with a gigantic makeup "compactie" (voiced by Hanna) eating Bogart in a pink suit. Bogart's best friends, Christine Stormberg, Peggy Noland, Tierney Finster and Tashi Condalee, are seen in the clip eating and licking beauty products such as cover-up and mascara sticks. Stormberg made the compactie out of papier-mâché, Noland created Bogart's pink suit, and Bogart himself painted the backdrops. On the week of November 13, 2015, Stereogum's Tom Breihan ranked the video number five on his "5 Best Videos Of The Week". Stratford also directed the official video for "Club With Me", which premiered on Rookie magazine on March 3, 2016, and depicts Bogart in a mall buying new clothes in a clubwear store and dancing with friends in a nightclub. As Bogart said, "I feel like JJ and I have this kind of magical thing going where our two styles come together and blend in a way that sorta reminds me of when MTV was cool when I was a kid."

"Plastic!" was premiered by Stereogum on January 27, 2016, with Wonderland magazine premiering its video on February 9. Bogart conceived the video for the song when he thought about how strange high-heeled footwear going through plastic surgery would be: "I had already made all of these sculptures and ceramics of hair products so I decided to make a high heel and have her get a makeover in a hair salon before she gets plastic surgery. It was a good excuse make all of my sculptures video stars before I sold them." The stop-motion-animated video was directed and animated by Hannah Lew of the groups Grass Widow and Cold Beat. The last scene depicts the high heels being hanged to death after smoking and drinking, and is set in a pink-colored replica of the set of the 1983 science fiction horror film Videodrome. Bogart had actually asked one of his friends who was actually in the movie, Debbie Harry, to appear in the music video, but she was unavailable. The fashion magazine Paper premiered "Forgotten Fantazy" on January 5, 2016, as well as Bogart's self-directed BDSM-infused video for the song on February 18. It was filmed at night in the Los Angeles Biltmore Hotel, his reasoning being that "I always knew I would dominate myself in a hotel room for the video—I love hotel rooms. They're so sexy." Andrew Clark was the video's director of photography, which Bogart opined he "did such a beautiful job," while Abdi Taslimi created the fake floral arrangement with satin and latex, as it was Bogart's two favorite materials. Bogart plays all of the characters in the video, such as the person in the bathtub and a guitar player and cigarette smoker on the corner of a wall.

Seth Bogart garnered positive reviews, with some calling Bogart's best record to date. On Metacritic, the record holds an aggregate weighted mean of an 81 out of 100, based on four reviews, while on AnyDecentMusic?, it has aggregate 6.9 out of ten based on five reviews, also a weighted average. Some reviewers highlighted the album's concept regarding artifice, one of them praising Bogart for combining it with real life. Some praised it for being confident enough to combine elements of punk and corny modern-day bright pop music together, while some enjoyed it as a fun party album; this included AllMusic's Tim Sendra: "The few moments when he brings the lights down a little and gets moody [...] show he's not a one-dimensional party animal and they give the record a little bit of gravity." In more mixed reviews, Hayley Scott of Loud and Quiet called Seth Bogart "refreshing" because of "Bogart’s rejection of boring earnestness", but also wrote that it could've been much better if not for its simple, sometimes out-of-date instrumentals and "effusive" vocal filters. A writer for Exclaim! felt the album would the satisfy the listener enough so that they'll forward to the singer's future material, but also wrote that at times it can feel too long as some tracks have too much of a similar sound to another.

== Track listing ==
All tracks are written by Seth Bogart and Cole MGN and produced by Cole MGN, with additional writing by Chelsea Wheatley on "Supermarket Supermodel".

No.	Title	Length
1.	"Hollywood Squares"	3:37
2.	"Eating Makeup" (featuring Kathleen Hanna)	3:00
3.	"Forgotten Fantasy"	4:03
4.	"Smash the TV"	3:38
5.	"Lubed" (featuring Jeremiah Nadya)	3:33
6.	"Club With Me"	3:43
7.	"Supermarket Supermodel" (featuring Chela)	4:12
8.	"Flurt" (featuring Chela)	2:50
9.	"Nina Hagen-Daaz" (featuring Clementine Creevy)	3:55
10.	"Plastic!"	3:53
11.	"Barely 21" (featuring Tavi Gevinson)	2:45
12.	"Sunday Boy"	4:52
Total length:		44:01
