= Simonne Jones =

US producer, singer, composer, model, visual artist, doctor

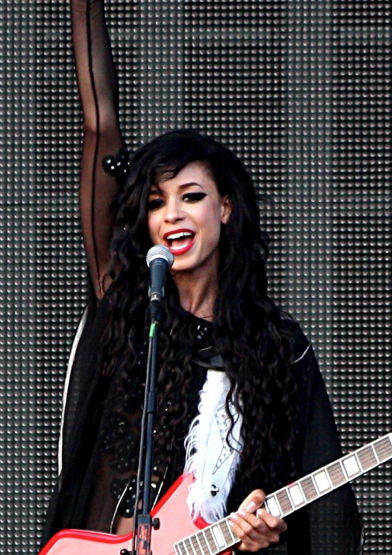
- Simonne Jones playing Hydrogen Festival in Padova, Italy 2013

Background information
- Born: Simonne Michelle Jones; February 23, 1987 (age 39); Hollywood, California, USA
- Genres: Pop; electro pop; alternative; dark pop
- Occupations: Singer; songwriter; producer
- Instruments: Vocals; guitar; keyboards; bass; percussion; pump organ; piano
- Years active: 2012–present
- Labels: Universal Music; Capitol; Vertigo
- Website: simonnejones.com

Simonne Michelle Jones (born February 23, 1987) is an American producer, singer, composer, model, visual artist, and doctor of medicine based in Berlin.

== Early life ==
Simonne Jones was born and raised in Hollywood, California. She is of Cherokee and Barbadian descent. Her maternal great-grandfather, Sir Frank Mortimer Maglinne Worrell, was an accomplished West Indies cricketer and senator. Simonne grew up playing the piano. She taught herself to read music at age 3 and by the age of 10, started composing music. As a young teenager, Jones began to produce her own music while learning to become a multi-instrumentalist.

When Jones was 15, she graduated high school by homeschooling herself. A year later, Elite Model Management signed Jones to a modeling contract at age 16. That same year, she moved across the country and began her college career at the University of Maryland, Baltimore County where she received her bachelor's degree in Biomedical research, and Visual arts with honors in 2008. While she was there, Jones pursued both scientific and artistic interests. These included being awarded a research grant to implement an HIV awareness program in Ghana and working for the Howard Hughes Medical Institute to conduct nuclear magnetic resonance imaging studies, and molecular cloning on mutated HIV-1 cells in an attempt to find a cure for the disease. She also debuted her first exhibition as a visual artist at Studio Art Center International (SACI) in Florence, Italy in 2007 and held her first solo exhibition as a painter in Manhattan.

Jones, after being accepted into medical school, changed her mind on a medical career and moved to Berlin to pursue a career in music. The Guardian wrote, "When faced with the decision between a career in science or music, she chose both".

== Career ==
=== 2012–2015: First steps in the music industry ===
Jones took her first steps as a professional musician when she was asked to perform at a Diesel show for Berlin fashion week in 2012. Jones was taken on as a protege by Peaches, who instilled artistic autonomy by encouraging her to engineer and produce recording sessions. They collaborated on the song Free Pussy Riot as a political protest to the imprisonment of the Russian performance artists Pussy riot.

In 2013 Jones was photographed for the cover of Missy Magazine. That year she was accepted into the Red Bull Music Academy in New York City. During this time she was invited to compose and perform as a soloist with the ORSO philharmonic orchestra and choir in Freiburg, Germany conducted by Wolfgang Rose. Shortly after she scored and performed in the play Jedermann directed by Bastian Kraft together with Philipp Hochmair, premiering at the prestigious Salzburg Festival, also making her acting debut playing the character Death. Jones performed her compositions in the play as a one-woman orchestra in China at Tianjin's Grand Theater, the Kurtheater Baden in Switzerland, the Theater Duisburg in Germany before the play moved to a residency at the Thalia Theater in Hamburg for the next 3 years. In 2014, she was invited to open for American rock band Thirty Seconds to Mars.

Jones completed a six-month artist residency at Berlin's art collective Platoon Kunsthalle where she constructed motion activated, MIDI-controlled, LED paintings exploring topics in physics and cosmology. She engineered them using open source computer controllers with her best friend, ArbitraryY, a software engineer in the aerospace industry. At the time Jones was involved in DIY audio performing with self-built midi controllers, synthesizers, LED costumes and complex loop machines. Jones also performs as a DJ, playing dark electronic music in nightclubs.

=== 2015–present: Soundhunters, Rub and Gravity ===
Jones explored music as a spiritual ritual in the Brazilian Amazon during an immersive indigenous experience in Nicolas Blies and Stéphane Hueber-Blies's documentary Soundhunters in 2015 with the Guaraní people. She released the song "The Silver Cord" in an album curated by Jean Michel Jarre called Zoolook Revisited inspired by his 1984 Zoolook album.

Jones has written and produced for other artists including the song "Vaginoplasty" with Peaches and Vice Cooler for her Rub album. She makes a cameo in the music video. Jones produced the remix "Sick in the Head" for the Rub Remixed album. Peaches also contributed a remix to Simonne's debut single as an exclusive premiere in Billboard magazine.

Jones gave several lectures about how the integration of science and art inform her artwork including at the inaugural Blue Dot Festival at the Jodrell Bank Observatory in Manchester and the Make Sound Festival in Leicester.

In 2016, she used gravitational wave audio from the collision of black holes form LIGO and collaborated with CERN using representations of real time particle collision data from the large hadron collider in the song "Alchemy". On May 27 of that year, Jones released the debut single and music video for "Gravity" worldwide via Universal/Capitol Records.

In 2021, Jones performed as a vocalist on Sneaker Pimps' first album in nearly 20 years, Squaring the Circle.

=== Return to medicine ===
Having earlier deferred a medical career to pursue music in Berlin, Jones later resumed clinical training. She earned a Doctor of Medicine (M.D.) degree from St. George's University in 2025. In 2025 she was the first author of a case report, "Spontaneous Resolution of Fixed Pediatric Trigger Thumb", published in the medical journal Cureus. In 2026 she began postgraduate residency training in the United States in diagnostic radiology.

== Musical style and influences ==
Jones produces, records and writes most of her music and lyrics alone in her studio and describes her music style as dark pop. Her music has experimented with elements of pop, sythpop, dream pop, punk, alternative, baroque pop, electronica and electro. She uses Pro Tools, Logic, Ableton and various analog synthesizers to produce.

Fusion described Jones' style, saying she "uses her background in scientific theory to write electro-pop songs that lyrically reference complex concepts like relativity and gravity while sounding both otherworldly and like a hymn you’ve always known."

Lena Dunham's newsletter Lenny Letter described, "Jones, who is a lover of science and a former biomedical researcher, cites her interest in concepts like the theory of relativity and other natural phenomena in her music as being fueled by her fascination with the "unknown mysteries of the universe."

Jones describes a production technique in Popular Science, "In Spooky Action I used sounds from a UK researcher who translates star pulses into audio waves to better understand them [...] I created a sound library where I can play the stars on a keyboard."

The music production software company Native Instruments released a Simonne Jones drum kit in the virtual instrument plug-in called Battery of sounds specific to her production style.

Her style has been compared to PJ Harvey, Nine Inch Nails, Florence and the Machine and Grimes.

== Discography ==
=== Singles ===
==== As a lead artist ====
| Title | Year | Record label | Writer(s) | Length |
|---|---|---|---|---|
| Gravity | 2016 | Vertigo/Capitol (Universal) | Thomas Edward Percy Hull, Simonne Jones | 3:21 |
| Runaways | 2017 | Vertigo/Capitol (Universal) | Simonne Jones, David Kosten | 3:47 |
| Psycho Pretty Boy | 2019 | OMN Label Services | Simonne Jones | 2:32 |
| Abduction | 2021 | OMN Label Services | Simonne Jones | 3:35 |

==== As a featured artist or writer ====
| Title | Year | Record label | Writer(s) | Length |
|---|---|---|---|---|
| Vaginoplasty | 2016 | I U She Music/Indigo | Peaches, Vice Cooler, Simonne Jones | 4:27 |
| Free Pussy Riot | 2012 | I U She Music/Indigo | Peaches, Simonne Jones | 2:47 |
| "Let's Be Lovers Tonight" | 2018 | Universal Music Group | Simonne Jones, Rea Garvey | 3:41 |
| "Water" | 2018 | Universal Music Group | Simonne Jones, Rea Garvey, Imran Abbas, Thomas Kessler | 3:22 |
| "Water" Neon Acoustic Session | 2018 | Universal Music Group | Simonne Jones, Rea Garvey, Imran Abbas, Thomas Kessler | 3:21 |
| "Let's Be Lovers Tonight" Neon Acoustic Session | 2018 | Universal Music Group | Simonne Jones, Rea Garvey | 4:12 |
| Halcyon | 2018 | Jewel Records | Simonne Jones, Ryan Sheridan | 3:15 |
| "Words" | 2019 | Universal Music Pte. Ltd. | Simonne Jones, Jannine Weigel | 3:45 |
| "Fighter" | 2021 | UNFALL | Simonne Jones, Sneaker Pimps | 4:07 |
| "Squaring The Circle" | 2021 | UNFALL | Simonne Jones, Sneaker Pimps | 3:24 |
| "Love Me Stupid" | 2021 | UNFALL | Simonne Jones, Sneaker Pimps | 4:57 |
| "No Show" | 2021 | UNFALL | Simonne Jones, Sneaker Pimps | 3:55 |
| "Child In The Dark" | 2021 | UNFALL | Simonne Jones, Sneaker Pimps | 4:26 |
| "Black Rain" | 2021 | UNFALL | Simonne Jones, Sneaker Pimps | 3:42 |
| "Lifeline" | 2021 | UNFALL | Simonne Jones, Sneaker Pimps | 4:07 |
| "Immaculate Hearts" | 2021 | UNFALL | Simonne Jones, Sneaker Pimps | 3:58 |
| "So Far Gone" | 2021 | UNFALL | Simonne Jones, Sneaker Pimps | 5:21 |
| "SOS" | 2021 | UNFALL | Simonne Jones, Sneaker Pimps | 4:28 |

==== As a producer ====
| Title | Year | Record label | Producer | Album | Length |
|---|---|---|---|---|---|
| Silver Cord | 2015 | Soundhunters | Simonne Jones | Zoolook Revisited | 3:35 |
| Sick in the Head (Remix) | 2016 | I U She Music | Simonne Jones | Rub Remixed by Peaches | 3:35 |
| "Let's Be Lovers Tonight" | 2018 | Universal Music Group | Simonne Jones | Neon | 3:41 |
| "Water" | 2018 | Universal Music Group | Simonne Jones, Rea Garvey, Abaz, X-Plosive | Neon | 3:22 |
| "SMS (Just Want to Be Loved)" | 2018 | Universal Music Group | Simonne Jones, Rea Garvey, Kiko Masbaum | Neon | 3:14 |
| "Turn Me Away" | 2018 | Universal Music Group | Simonne Jones, Rea Garvey, Abaz, X-Plosive | Neon | 3:05 |
| "Darkness" | 2018 | Universal Music Group | Simonne Jones, Rea Garvey | Neon | 3:03 |
| "I'll Follow" | 2018 | Jewel Records | Simonne Jones | Ryan Sheridan | 3:05 |
| Stay Stay | 2018 | Jewel Records | Simonne Jones | Ryan Sheridan | 3:53 |
| Back To Life | 2018 | Jewel Records | Simonne Jones | Ryan Sheridan | 3:20 |
| Blew My Mind | 2018 | Jewel Records | Simonne Jones | Ryan Sheridan | 3:42 |
| Halcyon | 2018 | Jewel Records | Simonne Jones | Ryan Sheridan | 3:15 |

== Awards and honors ==
| Year | Organization | Award | Result |
|---|---|---|---|
| 2018 | We Work Creator Award Berlin | Creator Award for Performing Arts | Won |

== Tours ==
=== Headlining ===
- Sowo tour (Italy, 2013)
- ORSO philharmonic (Germany 2013)
- Untitled tour (Italy, 2015)
- Thalia Theater tour (China, Germany, Austria, Switzerland, 2014–2016)

=== Supporting ===
- Poliça (2012)
- Thirty Seconds to Mars, Love, Lust, Faith and Dreams Tour (2013)
- Peaches, Rub Tour (2016)
