= Ladytron (disambiguation) =

Ladytron are an English electronic music band.

Ladytron may also refer to:

- Ladytron (album), by the English band, 2019
- "Ladytron" (song), by Roxy Music, 1972
- Ladytron (comics), a fictional character from the WildStorm comics superhero team Wildcats
