= Lost Weekend (Erase Errata album) =

Studio album by Erase Errata
- Released: January 20, 2015

Erase Errata chronology
Nightlife (2006)	Lost Weekend (2015)

Lost Weekend is the final studio album by Erase Errata. Written after a nine-year hiatus, the album was the band's last before their breakup. It was released under their own label, Under the Sun.

Competing demands of life, including children, work, and education, kept the band from playing together regularly. Singer Jenny Hoyston said that Lost Weekend was recorded when "we got the opportunity to play a music festival in Iowa City, and I happen to be good friends with a guy who owns a music studio there—Luke Tweedy—and he said, 'You’re gonna be here, let’s just get in the studio and turn the microphones on.'"

Hannah Lew directed the music video for "Don't Sit/Lie," featuring performance artist Jibz Cameron as a woman suffering an overnight nervous breakdown in a motel, only to leave the next morning calm and composed. Erase Errata also recorded a song for Lew's compilation album, San Francisco is Doomed.

== Reviews ==
Reviews were largely but not uniformly positive. Pitchfork rated the album 7.6/10, adding that the band has "grown into their own legacy." BUST Magazine described the song "My Life In Shadows" as "perfect driving music." The East Bay Express described the album as "a hesitant step with uncertain direction."
