= Jacob Cooper =

American musician

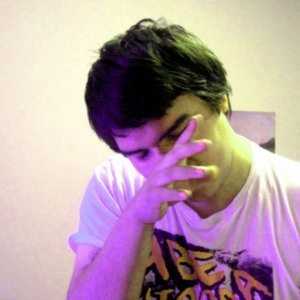

Background information
- Also known as: Jacob Safari, Heaven, Anne Frankenstein
- Born: Jacob Alonzo Cooper
- Origin: Tucson, Arizona
- Occupations: Musician, record producer, songwriter
- Years active: 2003–present
- Labels: Moshi Moshi Records, Retard Disco, Dais Records, Kill Rock Stars, Team Shi

Jacob Alonzo Cooper, also known as Jacob Safari, is an American musician, remixer, record producer, songwriter, and occasional DJ. Cooper has been a drummer of the bands Wavves, The Mae Shi, Cold Showers, Har Mar Superstar, and previously had a band called Bark Bark Bark. He currently has a project called Heaven, which first appeared in 2012.

== History ==
=== Bark Bark Bark (2003–2013) ===
Bark Bark Bark is an experimental, cut and paste electronic punk project formed by Cooper using the alias Jacob Safari. The project consists of Safari and guest artists and producers. Bark Bark Bark was discovered by Los Angeles-based Retard Disco after Safari played a show at The Smell and gave the label a cassette tape that later turned up to be completely blank. They have so far released one full-length studio album, several remixes, and a mixtape, Tour Girlfriends, released both digitally and as a limited physical release in early 2009 on Retard Disco. The studio album, Haunts, was described by Allmusic's Stewart Mason as "an uneven, occasionally frustrating exercise, but Safari evinces enough solid ideas to make it a worthwhile listen." A Steregoum article stated the title track has "a dirty, dark electro-pop vibe, with digi beats and distorto-vox that moan along to fit its name." Bark Bark Bark had a quiet ending after playing only 1 show in 3 years on top of a parking garage roof at 2008's SXSW Music Festival, coincidentally the same year The Mae Shi played a record-breaking 19 shows in 6 days. Jacob "re-united" to play his last Bark Bark Bark shows ever in his home state of Arizona in 2013 with long-time drummer Michael Sanger.

=== The Mae Shi (2007–2009) ===
Cooper joined Los Angeles-based post-punk The Mae Shi in 2007 after replacing Marcus Savino on drums. He, along with bandmates Bill Gray and Jon Gray, left a year later due primarily to founding member Jeff Byron's substance abuse issues. Cooper explained in an e-mail statement, "Helping hands were extended; we were supportive and respectful about the time to heal and even tried reaching out to Jeff when we were specifically told not to contact him by those closest to him." Cooper and the Grays formed a new band, Signals. Cooper later joined the noise rock/surf punk band Wavves.

=== Wavves (2010–2013) ===
Jacob replaced Billy Hayes of Wavves in November 2010 and immediately began an arena tour supporting the French band, Phoenix (band). After several US/international tours and television appearances on David Letterman and The Daily Habit with GZA (Wu Tang Clan, Jacob left the band in 2013. Brian Hill (The Soft Pack/The Plot to Blow Up the Eiffel Tower) began playing drums soon after.

=== Heaven (2012–present) ===
Jacob premiered several demos for a new solo project he had been working on between tours with Wavves called Heaven and formed a live band to play their first show at the Echo on Halloween night of 2012.

== Discography and appearances ==
=== Official releases and appearances ===
- Cold Showers - Plantlife (Dais Records/aufnahme + wiedergabe), 2015
- Cold Showers - Matter of Choice (Dais Records), 2015
- Wavves - TV Luv Song, on the Wavves/Trash Talk split 7-inch (Ghost Ramp Records), 2011
- Signals - Silverfish / What Dreams (Moshi Moshi Records/Retard Disco), 2010
- Signals - Vacation, appears on LA COLLECTION split 7-inch with The Franks (IAMSOUND Records), 2010
- Bark Bark Bark - Tour Girlfriends (Retard Disco), 2009
- Bark Bark Bark - Haunts on (Retard Disco), 2007

=== Mixtapes ===
- SMJWTWTTB SoundCloud stream, 2019
- Pizza The Hut Mixtape SoundCloud stream, 2010
- Hott Summer Traxx CD-R, 2006
- Noose and a Fire cassette tape, 2005
- Worst Dotted Line CD-R, 2004

=== Remixes ===
- "Endless Summer (Jacob Safari Remix)" for Batwings Catwings, 2011
- "Throwing Shade (Jacob Safari Remix)" for Abe Vigoda (band), 2011
- "Catcher In The Riot (Signals Hot Dog Remix)" for Cubismo Grafico Five, appears on the Japanese release of Life Is Like A Season 7-inch (Niw! Records), 2010
- "See Spaces (Jacob Safari Remix)" for TEETH, appears on the digital release of See Spaces (Moshi Moshi Records), 2010
- "You Are Free (The Mae Shi Remix)" for Mates of State, appears on Re-Arranged: Remixes Volume 1 (Barsuk Records), 2009
- "Your Control (The Mae Shi Remix)" for Crooked Fingers (Feat. Neko Case), appears on Your Control EP (Constant Artists), 2009

=== Other appearances ===
- Jacob Safari collaborated with Isaiah Toothtaker on ИOTHING, solely using unlicensed Nine Inch Nails samples and premiered on Vice Magazine's Noisey, 2013
- Heaven premiered "Hanging Out" and "Can't Grow Up With Poison" on Vice Magazine's Noisey, 2012
- Jacob Safari produced and played drums on the tracks "Breaking Down" and "Glare" for Kid Static, featured on It Gleams (Metal Postcard/Cobra Music), 2012
- Jacob Safari produced the track "Intruder" for Isaiah Toothtaker, featured on Yiggy (Wordemup Records), 2010
- Jacob Safari produced the track "Pool Party" for Wallpaper. featuring Kid Static, 2009
- 9 original sequences were created for Job For A Cowboy on their Radio Rebellion Tour as segues between songs, 2007
- 13 original tracks were created for Tucson-based pyrotechnic troupe Flam Chen for their Kaboom, 2006
