= Nicolas Blies and Stéphane Hueber-Blies =

French directors and screenwriters

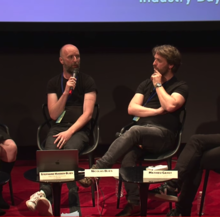
- Occupations: Filmmakers; Digital artists
- Notable work: Zero Impunity

Nicolas Blies, born on 26 September 1981 in Mulhouse (France), and Stéphane Hueber-Blies, born on 18 August 1976 in Mulhouse (France), also called Bliesbro, are two poets, musicians, filmmakers, producers and digital artists who create their works together. They are known for writing and directing the feature film Zero Impunity which was in official feature film competition at the Annecy International Animated Film Festival in 2019.

== Biography ==
In 2013, they conceptualized the documentary music transmedia Soundhunters in co-production with the French-German TV channel ARTE. Soundhunters was imagined to transform the world into an infinite musical instrument. It is the first part of the collection "Living the world poetically". The transmedia is released in 2015 in collaboration with many international artists including Jean Michel Jarre, Simonne Jones or Blixa Bargeld. The project is selected for the Prix Europa in Berlin and at SXSW. In 2016, the Blies brothers were invited to present their work at Lincoln Center during the New York Film Festival. The project is placed in 2016 under the high patronage of UNESCO.

In 2019, they wrote and directed their first feature film Zero Impunity. The feature-length documentary actually mixes animation and real footage. The film had its World premiere in March 2019 at the Thessaloniki International Film Festival (Greece) before being in official competition at the Annecy International Animated Film (France) and then the Palm Springs International Film Festival or the Moscow International Film Festival. Jordan Mintzer of The Hollywood Reporter gave the documentary a mostly favorable review for calling attention to the widespread indifference to sexual assault and sexual abuse by both terrorist organizations and sanctioned governmental organizations such as the United States Armed Forces and the United Nations peacekeepers. However, Mintzer criticized the film for trying to cover too many separate stories in its runtime, and for relying on "heavy-handed aesthetics [...] to make a point that didn’t need to be so overemphasized". Allen Hunter of ScreenDaily praised the film for giving a voice to sexual assault victims and for calling attention to the international issue of sexual violence in wartime. Cineuropa said that the genius of Zero Impunity lies in its waltz between real-life shots and animation. In 2021, the film is nominated for the Best documentary Price at the Trophées Francophones du Cinéma.

The film is the centerpiece of an international transmedia social impact project denouncing the impunity of sexual violence in wartime. The transmedia project is built as an "active media that promotes the liberation of the word and thus fights against impunity". The Zero Impunity media, supported by more than 400,000 citizens around the world, was launched with the publication of the first investigation L'ADN de Sangaris in Médiapart (France), Internazionale (Italy), InfoLibre (Spain), Le Desk (Morocco), Inkyfada (Tunisia), Correctiv (Germany), Le Jeudi and Tageblatt (Luxembourg). The transmedia won the FIPA d'Or 2017 and was selected for the Visa d'Or de l'information France TV.

In 2024, continuing their plastic research in the field of hybridization of forms, the Blies brothers released the digital art installation Ceci est mon coeur (This Is My Heart), about the reconciliation of a child with his body, mixing video-mapping and connected clothing. Following Zero Impunity, here again they hybridize animation and live action. For the first time, they also use a technique akin to "Spoken Word". The World Premiere of Ceci est mon coeur take place during the 81st Venice International Film Festival. Ceci est mon coeur is selected to participate at the 78th Cannes Film Festival. The project is distinguished during the "Breakthroughs in Storytelling Awards" from Columbia University New York City.

== Political commitments ==
In March 2022, at the beginning of the invasion of Ukraine by the Russian Federation, the Blies brothers spoke out in favor of a cultural boycott of Russian artists.

== Jury ==
In 2020, the Blies brothers are members of the feature film jury section "Contrechamp" at the 44th Annecy International Animation Film Festival. The same year, the Blies brothers are invited by the Annecy Film Festival to give their vision of animation cinema in the section « Lessons of cinema ».

In 2018, Nicolas Blies is a member of the jury section "National Documentary" and Stéphane Hueber-Blies member and president of the section "Innovation Award" at the 31st International Festival of Audiovisual Production in Biarritz (FIPA).

== Awards ==
- 2015 Biarritz International Audiovisual Production Festival (FIPA d'OR for Best Digital Work) for Soundhunters
- 2015 Sichuan Film Festival (Golden Panda Grand Prize and Golden Panda Most innovative user experience) for Soundhunters
- 2015 Le Mois du Webdoc (Courrier International Award) for Soundhunters
- 2017 Biarritz International Audiovisual Production Festival (FIPA d'OR for Best Digital Work) for Zero Impunity
- 2019 Porto Vecchio Political Film Festival (Audience Award for Best Political Documentary) for Zero Impunity
- 2020 Bucharest International Animation Film Festival (Best Feature Film Award) for Zero Impunity
- 2025 Breakthrough in Storytelling Awards (Columbia University) for Ceci est mon coeur
- 2025 Luxembourg FilmPräis (Best immersive work Prize) for Ceci est mon coeur

== Nominations ==
- 2026 Athens Digital Arts Festival for Ceci est mon coeur
- 2025 Geneva International Film Festival (Best immersive work) for Ceci est mon coeur
- 2025 Cannes Film Festival (Immersive selection) for Ceci est mon coeur
- 2024 Venice International Film Festival (Best immersive work) for Ceci est mon coeur
- 2020 Guadalajara International Film Festival (Best Animated Film Award) for Zero Impunity
- 2019 São Paulo International Film Festival (New Directors Competition) for Zero Impunity
- 2019 Annecy International Animation Film Festival (Best Feature Film Award Contrechamp) for Zero Impunity
- 2019 Thessaloniki International Film Festival (Amnesty International Award) for Zero Impunity
- 2015 Prix Europa (Best Digital Work Award) for Soundhunters
- 2015 Visa de l'Information France TV (Best Digital Work Award) for Zero Impunity

== Conferences ==
- 2023 " Documentary : subject, impact and cinema" invited by ACID Cannes Film Festival (France)
- 2022 " Voices from the frontline " invited by Internazionale in Ferrara (Italy)
- 2019 " Existing in the media noise " with Edwy Plenel (Mediapart) and Oleksandra Matviitchuk (Nobel Peace Prize)
- 2018 "Dance, art and trauma" invited by Dorothée Munyanesa during her stay at Villa Medici in Rome
- 2018 "Sexual Violence in Wartime" invited by the University of Angers and Dr. Denis Mukwege (Nobel Peace Prize)
- 2015 " Les chasseurs de sons " with Jean Michel Jarre at the Gaité Lyrique Paris
