= Rub (album) =

Studio album by Peaches
- Released: September 25, 2015
- Recorded: 2013–2014
- Genre: Electropop
- Length: 41:23
- Label: I U She
- Producers: Peaches; Vice Cooler

Peaches chronology
I Feel Cream (2009)	Rub (2015)	No Lube So Rude (2026)

Singles from Rub
- 1. "Light in Places" Released: June 23, 2015; 2. "Close Up" Released: August 18, 2015; 3. "Dick in the Air" Released: September 9, 2015

Rub is the sixth studio album by Canadian electronic musician Peaches. It was released on September 25, 2015 by I U She Music.

The album was produced by Vice Cooler with Peaches in her Los Angeles garage throughout 2013 and 2014. In June 2015, the album was announced to contain guest vocal appearances by Kim Gordon, Feist, and Simonne Jones.

== Critical reception ==
Professional ratings
Aggregate scores
Source	Rating
Metacritic	78/100
Review scores
Source	Rating
DIY	4/5 stars
Exclaim!	6/10
The Line of Best Fit	7.5/10
Mojo	3/5 stars
Now	4/5 stars
The Observer	4/5 stars
Pitchfork	7.0/10
PopMatters	8/10
Q	4/5 stars
Uncut	4/5 stars

On Metacritic, Rub received a score of 78 out of 100 from 12 critics, indicating "generally favorable reviews". Fiona Sturges of Uncut described the music on the album as "x-rated electro-pop".

== Track listing ==
All tracks are written by Peaches and Vice Cooler, except where noted.

No.	Title	Writer(s)	Length
1.	"Close Up" (featuring Kim Gordon)	Peaches; Cooler; Gordon	3:27
2.	"Rub"		3:37
3.	"Dick in the Air"		3:10
4.	"Pickles"		3:53
5.	"Sick in the Head"		3:19
6.	"Free Drink Ticket"		4:09
7.	"How You Like My Cut"		3:10
8.	"Vaginoplasty" (featuring Simonne Jones)	Peaches; Cooler; Jones	4:27
9.	"Light in Places"		4:19
10.	"Dumb Fuck"		4:22
11.	"I Mean Something" (featuring Feist)	Peaches; Cooler; Feist	3:36

== Personnel ==
- Phillip Broussard Jr. – engineer ("Sick in the Head")
- Camilla Camaglia – photography
- Vice Cooler – composer, producer, synthesizer, drums, percussion, sampler
- Feist – composer, featured artist ("I Mean Something")
- Kim Gordon – composer, featured artist ("Close Up")
- Jimmy Harry – composer, synthesizer ("Dumb Fuck")
- Simonne Jones – composer, featured artist ("Vaginoplasty")
- Daria Marchik – cover photo
- Mocky – synthesizer ("Rub")
- Mumbai Science – additional percussion ("Vaginoplasty")
- Nadine Neven – percussion, producer, synthesizer ("Light in Places")
- Cole Nystrom – assistant mixer
- Peaches – art direction, composer, design, primary artist, producer
- Dave Pensado – mixing
- Planningtorock – composer, vocal production ("Free Drink Ticket")
- Siriusmo – additional percussion ("Pickles")
- Dale Voelker – design

== Charts ==
Chart (2015)	Peak position
Belgian Albums (Ultratop Flanders)	110
UK Albums (OCC)	187
UK Independent Albums (Official Charts)	27
US Top Dance Albums (Billboard)	4
US Independent Albums (Billboard)	38
US Heatseekers Albums (Billboard)	7
