= Ladytron (album) =

2019 album by Ladytron

Studio album by Ladytron
- Released: 1 February 2019
- Recorded: 2016–2018
- Genre: Synth-pop; electropop; electroclash; indie rock
- Length: 53:41
- Label: Ladytron Music
- Producer: Jim Abbiss; Mira Aroyo; Vice Cooler; Edd Hartwell; Daniel Hunt; Ladytron; Johnny Scott

Ladytron chronology
Gravity the Seducer (2011)	Ladytron (2019)	Time's Arrow (2023)

Singles from Ladytron
- 1. "The Animals" Released: 28 February 2018; 2. "The Island" Released: 16 August 2018; 3. "Far from Home" Released: 29 November 2018; 4. "Deadzone" Released: 25 October 2019; 5. "Tower of Glass" Released: 5 February 2020

Professional ratings
Aggregate scores
Source	Rating
AnyDecentMusic?	7.0/10
Metacritic	78/100
Review scores
Source	Rating
AllMusic	4/5 stars
Bust	5/5 stars
Drowned in Sound	7/10
The Guardian	4/5 stars
The Line of Best Fit	7.5/10
Mojo	4/5 stars
MusicOMH	4/5 stars
Pitchfork	7.7/10
Q	4/5 stars
Uncut	7/10

Ladytron is the sixth studio album by English electronic music band Ladytron. It was released on 1 February 2019 through PledgeMusic as well as their Ladytron Music imprint via !K7. The songs "The Animals", "The Island", "Far from Home", and "Deadzone" have been released as singles. Daniel Hunt has described the album as "heavier" than the group's previous album, Gravity the Seducer (2011).

Ladytron received generally positive reviews from critics and debuted at number twenty-six on the Scottish albums chart.

== Background ==
Ladytron went on hiatus after they finished touring their fifth album, Gravity the Seducer, but the band's members pursued solo projects. Mira Aroyo collaborated on The Projects' last album, Elektrichka's Favourite Party Record and made some documentaries. Daniel Hunt co-produced Marnie's debut album Crystal World, produced Lush's first release in 20 years (the EP Blind Spot) and other projects. Helen Marnie made two solo albums (Crystal World and Strange Words and Weird Wars) and played solo shows with a live band. Reuben Wu was occupied with photography, visual art and making music for ads.

The band planned to release a new album in 2013, then again in 2016 but the plans didn't work out.

== Production ==
On 18 July 2016, the band posted on their official website: "After a five year hiatus following the release of their fifth album Gravity the Seducer, another chapter in Ladytron's story is about to begin." On 26 November 2016, Ladytron posted on Instagram an image with a SSL recording console, implying that the recording of their sixth album started. On 28 February 2018, Ladytron started a PledgeMusic campaign to finish recording and releasing their new album. The announcement was accompanied by the lead single, "The Animals". The recording of the album started on 25 June and ended on 17 September. Helen Marnie stated that they have "spent some time down in Southeast England recording it for about a month or so." Ladytron and Jim Abbiss (who also co-produced Witching Hour) produced this album with the exception of "Paper Highways" and "Horrorscope" which were produced by both Vice Cooler and Mira Aroyo.

Daniel Hunt described this album as "a lot heavier than "Gravity," which was an intentionally more sedate, ethereal record. The atmospheres are there, but there's more urgency underneath." Marnie added: "For us, it's like getting together with an old friend. You've both changed, but still have that common ground. Familiarity crossed with excitement."

The album features guest Igor Cavalera (Sepultura, Mixhell, Soulwax) on drums. The cover art depicting a couple running towards a forest fire was created by Reuben Wu, Neil Krug, and Jeff Frost.

== Singles ==
Ladytron was supported by four singles. The first single, "The Animals", was released on 28 February 2018 and was accompanied by a music video directed by Fernando Nogari. "The Island" was released as the second single on 16 August 2018 and has a music video directed by Bryan M. Ferguson. The third single "Far From Home" was released on 29 November. A fourth single, “Deadzone”, was released in advance of a new tour in North America and U.K. on 15 September 2019 and it was accompanied by a music video directed, once again, by Bryan M. Ferguson. A fifth and final single, "Tower of Glass", was released 5 February 2020 along with a music video and short film, both of which were written and directed by Manuel Nogueira and shot in the remote North East of Brazil.

== Release ==
The album was originally set for release on 12 October 2018, but the release date was moved to January 2019 and then to February 2019. Ladytron was released on 1 February 2019 by PledgeMusic and on 15 February by !K7. Following PledgeMusic announcing bankruptcy, it emerged that not all of the promised merchandise had been manufactured, and what had been was being held by the administrators rather than despatched. There were reports that the Pledge exclusive merchandise was being sold to customers at the live shows promoting the album release, with even some fans posting photos on social media. In July 2019, Ladytron announced they had bought these items and would send them to pledgers for the postage costs.

== Track listing ==
Ladytron track listing
No.	Title	Writer(s)	Producer(s)	Length
1.	"Until the Fire"	Daniel Hunt	Ladytron; Jim Abbiss^{[a]}; Edd Hartwell^{[a]}	5:34
2.	"The Island"	Helen Marnie; Johnny Scott	Ladytron; Scott; Abbiss^{[a]}; Hartwell^{[a]}	4:04
3.	"Tower of Glass"	Hunt	Ladytron; Abbiss^{[a]}; Hartwell^{[a]}	4:00
4.	"Far from Home"	Hunt	Ladytron; Abbiss^{[a]}; Hartwell^{[a]}	3:35
5.	"Paper Highways"	Mira Aroyo; Vice Cooler	Aroyo; Cooler	3:37
6.	"The Animals"	Hunt	Ladytron; Abbiss; Hartwell^{[a]}	4:32
7.	"Run"	Marnie; Reuben Wu	Ladytron; Abbiss^{[a]}; Hartwell^{[a]}	2:51
8.	"Deadzone"	Marnie	Ladytron; Abbiss^{[a]}; Hartwell^{[a]}	4:26
9.	"Figurine"	Hunt; Marnie; Wu	Ladytron; Abbiss^{[a]}; Hartwell^{[a]}	4:06
10.	"You've Changed"	Marnie; Scott	Ladytron; Scott; Abbiss^{[a]}; Hartwell^{[a]}	4:28
11.	"Horrorscope"	Aroyo; Cooler	Aroyo; Cooler	3:20
12.	"The Mountain"	Hunt	Ladytron; Abbiss^{[a]}; Hartwell^{[a]}	4:32
13.	"Tomorrow Is Another Day"	Marnie	Ladytron; Abbiss^{[a]}; Hartwell^{[a]}	4:36
Total length:				53:41

Notes

- ^{^a} signifies an additional producer

== Personnel ==
Ladytron

- Mira Aroyo
- Daniel Hunt
- Helen Marnie
- Reuben Wu

Additional musicians

- Igor Cavalera – drums
- Billy Brown – drums
- John Gibbons – brass (track 6)
- Dan Thorne – brass (track 6)
- Dino Gollnick – additional guitars (track 11)

Technical personnel

- Ladytron – production
- Jim Abbiss – production, mixing (track 6); additional production (tracks 1–4, 6–10, 12–13)
- Mira Aroyo – production (tracks 5 and 11)
- Vice Cooler – production (tracks 5 and 11)
- Dave Pensado – mixing (tracks 5 and 11)
- George Chung – mixing (track 6)
- Johnny Scott – production (tracks 2 and 10)
- Edd Hartwell – mixing, additional production (tracks 1–4, 6–10, 12–13)
- Daniel Woodward – additional mixing (track 6)
- Matt Colton – mastering

Design

- Neil Krug – artwork
- Jeff Frost – artwork
- Reuben Wu – artwork
- Anders Ladegaard – layout

== Charts ==
Chart performance for Ladytron
Chart (2019)	Peak position
Scottish Albums (OCC)	26
UK Album Downloads (OCC)	38
UK Albums Sales (OCC)	40
UK Physical Albums (OCC)	48
UK Independent Albums (OCC)	5
US Heatseekers Albums (Billboard)	3
US Independent Albums (Billboard)	10
US Top Dance Albums (Billboard)	13
US Indie Store Album Sales (Billboard)	16
