= Lost Weekend =

Lost Weekend most commonly refers to:

- Lost Weekend (Phoebe Bridgers album), 2026
- John Lennon's description of his 18 months living with May Pang, see John Lennon#"Lost weekend": 1973–1975

Lost Weekend or The Lost Weekend may also refer to:

== Fiction ==
- The Lost Weekend (novel), a 1944 novel by Charles R. Jackson
  - The Lost Weekend, a 1945 film adaptation of the novel
- "The Lost Weekend" (The Cosby Show), a 1989 television episode
- "The Lost Weekend" (Dawson's Creek), a 2001 television episode
- "Lost Weekend" (St. Elsewhere), a 1986 television episode
- "The Lost Weekend", a 1997 straight-to-video feature-length episode of Brookside

== Music ==
- The Lost Weekend (album), 1985 album by Danny & Dusty
- Lost Weekend (Erase Errata album), 2015
- Lost Weekend (Phoebe Bridgers album), 2026
- Lost Weekend (EP), a 2002 EP by The Clientele
- Lost Weekend (song), a 1985 song by Lloyd Cole and the Commotions
- "Lost Weekend", a song by The Bats from Couchmaster
- "Lost Weekend", a song by The Qemists from Join the Q
- "Lost Weekend", a song by Wall of Voodoo from Call of the West
- "Lost weekend", John Lennon's description of his 18 months living with May Pang, see John Lennon#"Lost weekend": 1973–1975
