= Simo Soo =

Australian musician

Simo Soo is a non-binary Australian hip hop producer, vocalist, rapper, DJ and head of independent dance and hip hop record label, Yes Rave.

Their music is the sound of Frank Zappa with a pirated copy of Ableton Live and a Metro Boomin sample pack, Björk and the Powerpuff Girls starting a black metal band; the Beastie Boys collaborating with a noise version of Yo Gabba Gabba.

Soo has performed with Peaches, Chicks on Speed, Das Racist, Heems, The Preatures, The Rubens, Hawnay Troof and Boredoms.

Their production and features include artists such as Brendan Maclean, Kučka, Clipping, Spacegirl Gemmy, Tobacco Rat, Neil O'hardty and Abdu Ali.

Simo Soo has toured in North America, Australia and Spain. Whilst performing live, Soo prefers to perform on the floor (rather than the stage) of DIY venues such as L.A.'s The Smell and Sydney's Red Rattler. Soo has released multiple solo albums, EPs and remix compilations (most self-released via the internet, Sydney based label, Lesstalk Records or through their own Yes Rave record label).

== Personal life ==
Soo uses they/them pronouns.

== Sources ==
- https://web.archive.org/web/20120316115840/http://www.ravemagazine.com.au/content/view/21111/81/
- https://www.identicalrecords.com/interview-simo-soo/
- http://sounddoc.net/2014/11/simo-soo-stoned-in-the-supermarket/
- https://fbiradio.com/independent-artist-of-the-week-b00bjob/
- http://whothehell.net/archives/29045
