= Soundhunters =

Official Film Poster

Soundhunters is a transmedia musical project created by Nicolas Blies and Stéphane Hueber-Blies (also known as the Blies brothers), Marion Guth, and François Le Gall. It was broadcast on the Franco-German channel Arte in 2015 and deployed internationally via Native Instruments and the music streaming platform SoundCloud.

The project offers the audience the opportunity to remix the world around them through a creative, collaborative process. Soundhunters is composed of a feature-length documentary broadcast on Arte on 19 September 2015 (directed by Beryl Koltz), a web documentary featuring international artists (Daedelus, Luke Vibert, Mikael Seifu, Simonne Jones), a participatory mobile application, and a music album sponsored by Jean Michel Jarre, entitled Zoolook Revisited.

== History ==
Soundhunters was conceptualized by Nicolas Blies and Stéphane Hueber-Blies, François Le Gall, and Marion Guth of the Luxembourg production company a_BAHN. Openly inspired by the album Zoolook (1984) to which he pays tribute, Soundhunters was created to transform the world into an infinite musical instrument. The documentary approach offers the general public the opportunity to discover and explore the sampling technique: a sound technique that was at the heart of the Zoolook album's approach. Jean Michel Jarre explains: "The title "Zoolook" is what? It means observing the zoo of which we are each apart. That's the idea. So to take up this idea, to continue to develop it, is for me exactly what a creative work must generate, to make others want to continue. Once you have finished what you have done, it no longer belongs to you".

== The transmedia ==
Soundhunters was released in 2015 and consists of several media:

- A 52' feature-length documentary directed by Beryl Koltz (with the participation of Chassol, Matthew Herbert, Blixa Bargeld, Jean Michel Jarre, Matmos, Kiz, Joseph Bertolozzi). Broadcast on Arte on 19 September 2015. The film was then broadcast in several countries including Denmark, Holland, and NHK in Japan
- A web documentary featuring the creative sampling process involving 4 international artists (Simonne Jones, Mikael Seifu, Daedelus and Luke Vibert)
- A participatory tribute music album whose tracks were chosen by Jean Michel Jarre, entitled Zoolook Revisited
- Web and mobile applications (iOS and Android) for collaborative creation

== Awards ==
Soundhunters wins the FIPA d'Or for the best digital work in Biarritz in 2015. The transmedia project won also the Golden Panda "Grand Prix" and "The Most Innovative Experience" Golden Panda at the Sichuan Film Festival in 2015.

Soundhunters also won the Courrier International Prize for the best web documentary in 2016.

Soundhunters was also presented at the conference at SXSW and the NYFF Convergence (New York Film Festival) in 2016.
