= Too Young to Be in Love =

2011 studio album by Hunx and His Punx

Studio album by Hunx and His Punx
- Released: 2011
- Length: 31:01
- Label: Hardly Art

Hunx and His Punx chronology
Too Young to Be in Love (2011)	Street Punk (2013)

Professional ratings
Aggregate scores
Source	Rating
Metacritic	69/100
Review scores
Source	Rating
AllMusic	4/5 stars
Pitchfork	7.2/10

Too Young to Be in Love is the first studio album from American punk rock band Hunx and His Punx. It was released in 2011 under Hardly Art Records.

== Track listing ==
No.	Title	Writer(s)	Length
1.	"Lovers Lane"	Shannon Shaw/Seth Bogart	3:35
2.	"He's Coming Back"	Seth Bogart	2:22
3.	"Keep Away from Johnny"	Blanchard/Shaw	3:32
4.	"The Curse of Being Young"	Shannon Shaw	2:51
5.	"Too Young to Be in Love"	Bogart/Michelle Santamaria	3:43
6.	"If You're Not Here (I Don't Know Where You Are)"	Seth Bogart	3:22
7.	"Bad Boy"	Shannon Shaw	2:41
8.	"Tonite Tonite"	Seth Bogart	3:04
9.	"Can We Get Together?"	McVicker/Davenport	2:04
10.	"Blow Me Away"	Bogart/Santamaria	3:47

== Personnel ==
Hunx and His Punx

- Seth Bogart (Hunx) – guitar, organ, vocals
- Erin Emalie – vocals, drums
- Shannon Shaw – vocals, bass
- Michelle Santamaria – vocals, lead guitar
- Amy Blaustein – guitar, organ, vocals

Others

- Produced and mastered by Ivan Julian
- Art by Hunx
- Photos by Amos Mac, painted by Brande Bytheway and Hunx
