= Retard Disco =

- Founded: 2003
- Distributor(s): Southern Records
- Genre: Indie rock, electroclash, queercore, electropop
- Country of origin: U.S.
- Location: Los Angeles, California
- Official website: www.retarddisco.com

Retard Disco is an American, Los Angeles-based record label. The label launched with two debut releases by 14 Year Old Girls and Hawnay Troof in 2003. The label subsequently released over two dozen records by artists including Partyline, Epsilons, The Younger Lovers, Bark Bark Bark and more.

Henry Rollins has been a vocal fan of the label, frequently playing Retard Disco releases on his radio show and citing the label, alongside Dischord, Ipecac, and Matador, as his favorites.

The label first gained attention when the band 14 Year Old Girls performed live on national TV, on Tech TV's X-Play and G4 TV's The Screen Savers and Players. The band was written up in GamePRO, EGM, GameNOW and more, played shows with Gravy Train!!!!, Pansy Division and The Briggs. They once played at Magic Mountain and they have played at an Elks Lodge. Maximum Rock'n'Roll called them "Quite endearing" and Punknews.org declared them "the inventors of Nintendo punk."

Epsilons band-members included then-teenagers Ty Segall and Charlie Mootheart.

The label released the DVD Stame The Batch featuring the band Gravy Train!!!!

Because the label was home to bands 14 Year Old Girls, Totally Radd!! and Bad Dudes, it became known as a hub for the genre known as "Nintendo Punk." Both 14 Year Old Girls and Totally Radd!! released exclusive songs on a CDRom that was paired with issues of gaming magazine EGM as a special promotion set by the label.

Hawnay Troof released six albums on Retard Disco and many videos including "Connection" which charted #2 indie video of the year (MTV2, 2008) and #1 video on MTVU (MTVU, 2009)

The Younger Lovers is the musical project of acclaimed author Brontez Purnell.

== Roster ==
- 14 Year Old Girls
- Bad Dudes
- Bark Bark Bark
- Epsilons
- Gene Defcon
- Gravy Train!!!!
- Hawnay Troof
- Manda Rin
- The Munchers
- Partyline
- Scream Club
- Signals
- The Show is the Rainbow
- Totally Radd!!
- The Younger Lovers
