= Zero Impunity =

- Directed by: Nicolas Blies and Stéphane Hueber-Blies
- Screenplay by: Nicolas Blies and Stéphane Hueber-Blies
- Produced by: Marion Guth; Stéphan Roelants; François Le Gall; Louise Génis-Cosserat
- Music by: Holland Andrews
- Production companies: a_BAHN Mélusine Productions; Webspider Productions; Camera Talk Productions
- Distributed by: IndieSales
- Release date: March 2019
- Running time: 93 minutes
- Countries: Luxembourg, France
- Languages: French, English, Arabic, Ukrainian
- Budget: €2 million

Zero Impunity is a multimedia documentary film by Nicolas Blies and Stéphane Hueber-Blies (a.k.a. the Blies brothers). Animation was co-directed with Denis Lambert. The film explores the systematic occurrence of wartime sexual violence and assault. The film premiered at the Thessaloniki International Film Festival, and was subsequently released in international film festivals such as Annecy International Animation Film Festival, São Paulo International Film Festival (Mostra), Palm Springs International Film Festival, Festival Internacional de Cine en Guadalajara and Moscow International Film Festival.

== Production ==
Zero Impunity was developed and conceptualized by Marion Guth and the director duo Nicolas Blies and Stéphane Hueber-Blies (a.k.a. the Blies Brothers) on the basis of investigative reports commissioned by the directors into the issue of sexual violence in several countries, carried out as part of the film. Investigations have been entrusted to the French journalists' collective YouPress. Zero Impunity was launched on January 3, 2017 with the publication of six investigative reports on Médiapart. (France) and 10 media partners in Europe, North Africa and the Middle East. The production of the feature-length documentary ran throughout 2017. New sequences were shot between September 2017 and December 2017 in Ukraine, Jordan, United States and France.

== Synopsis ==
The film is based on six investigative reports by eleven female journalists on the impact and occurrence of sexual violence and systemic abuse in wartime. The events covered include instances of abuse of civilians in the Central African Republic during Operation Sangaris, sexual abuse and torture of prisoners under the Bush administration, sexual slavery and assault by the forces of Bashar al-Assad in Syria, and sexual violence in Ukraine. The film also criticizes the United Nations and the International Criminal Court. The reports are conveyed through both animated segments and live-action film segments with survivors, psychologists, whistleblowers, and investigators.

== Release ==
The film made its world premiere in March 2019 at the Thessaloniki International Film Festival before being in official competition at the Annecy International Animation Film Festival in June 2019. The film is scheduled to make its US premiere at Palm Springs International Film festival in January 2020.

The film was planned to be released in theaters in France on June 11, 2020. The release of the film was postponed because of the Covid-19 pandemic.

== Reception ==
The film received mainly positive reviews.

Jordan Mintzer of The Hollywood Reporter gave the documentary a mostly favorable review for calling attention to the widespread indifference to sexual assault and sexual abuse by both terrorist organizations and sanctioned governmental organizations such as the United States Armed Forces and the United Nations peacekeepers. However, Mintzer criticized the film for trying to cover too many separate stories in its runtime, and for relying on "heavy-handed aesthetics [...] to make a point that didn’t need to be so overemphasized".

Allen Hunter of ScreenDaily praised the film for giving a voice to sexual assault victims and for calling attention to the international issue of sexual violence in wartime. The French newspaper Le Figaro gave it a positive review, calling it "a punching film" that "left Annecy speechless".

Amber Wilkinson of Eye For Film was mostly positive, although she also noted that the film was dense in places and could have benefited if "perhaps less [sic] on situations already heavily documented, such as Syria and Abu Ghraib, would have allowed them more time to focus on under-discussed topics, such as the alleged indifference of the UN".

=== Nominations and awards ===
Zero Impunity won the FIPA D'OR 2017 SmartFipa in Biarritz. In 2019, the film also won the audience award at Festival du Film Politique Porto-Vecchio and the Best Feature Film Award at the Bucharest International Animation Film festival in 2020.

List of awards won, showing year, country and competition
| Festival | Country | Year | Competition |
|---|---|---|---|
| Thessaloniki International Film Festival | Greece | 2019 | Official Competition |
| FIFDH | Switzerland | 2019 | Official Competition |
| FICAM | Morocco | 2019 | Official Selection |
| Lucca Film Festival | Italia | 2019 | Official Competition |
| Moscow International Film Festival | Russia | 2019 | Official Selection |
| Molodist KIFF | Ukraine | 2019 | Official Selection |
| Annecy Film Festival | France | 2019 | Official Competition |
| Fantoche | Switzerland | 2019 | Official Selection |
| Québec City Film Festival | Canada | 2019 | Official Competition |
| AnimaSyros | Greece | 2019 | Official Competition |
| Freedom Film Festival | Malaysia | 2019 | Official Selection |
| Madrid International Contemporary Animation Festival | Spain | 2019 | Official Selection |
| FIFF Namur | Belgium | 2019 | Official Selection |
| Human Rights Film Festival Lugano | Switzerland | 2019 | Official Selection |
| 10th International Animation Festival of Pernambuco | Brazil | 2019 | Official Selection |
| Cambridge Film Festival | UK | 2019 | Official Competition |
| Bucheon International Animation Festival (BIAF) | South Korea | 2019 | Official Competition |
| Festival du Film Politique Porto-Vecchio (Audience AWARD) | France | 2019 | Official Competition |
| São Paulo International Film Festival | Brazil | 2019 | Official Competition |
| Mostra de Valencia | Spain | 2019 | Official Selection |
| Festival Cinéma et Droits Humains – Amnesty International | France | 2019 | Official Selection |
| FIFF Tübingen | Germany | 2019 | Official Competition |
| Amiens International Film Festival | France | 2019 | Official Selection |
| Panorama of the European Film | Egypt | 2019 | Official Selection |
| Bergen International Animation Festival | Norway | 2019 | Official Selection |
| Joburg Film Festival | South-Africa | 2019 | Official Selection |
| Les Sommets de l’Animation | Canada | 2019 | Official Selection |
| Carrefour du Cinéma d’Animation | France | 2019 | Official Selection |
| Festival International du Film Politique (Carcassonne) | France | 2019 | Official Competition |
| Peloponnisos International Documentary Festival | Greece | 2020 | Official Competition |
| Palm Springs International Film Festival | USA | 2020 | Official Selection |
| FIPADOC | France | 2020 | Official Competition |
| Festival Internacional de Cine en Guadalajara | Mexico | 2020 | Official Competition |
