= Vice Cooler =

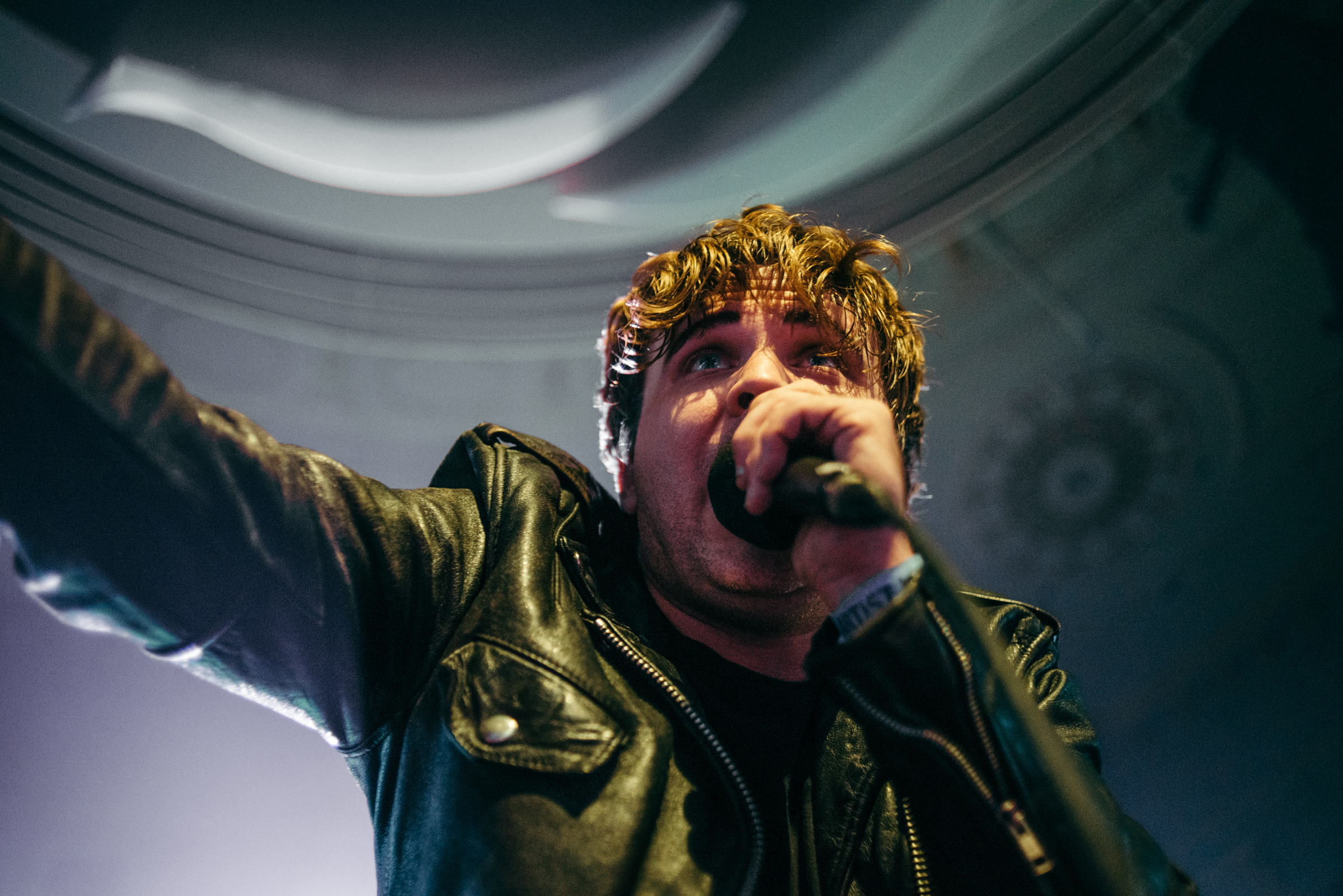
- Vice Cooler at Sled Island 2016

Background information
- Born: Mobile, Alabama, United States
- Instruments: Vocals, Guitar, drums, Synthesizer, Computer Audio Production
- Years active: 1998–present

Vice Cooler is an American musician, music video director, and photographer.

He has been recognized by people like High Places and Henry Rollins as an "inspiration". Peaches has crowned him as the world's greatest performer.

== Band history ==
Cooler started performing music live in 1998 with XBXRX. He drummed for the band KIT and has also guested as the live drummer for Chicks On Speed and The Raincoats.

Now he spends most of his time as a music writer and producer working with such artist as Peaches, Ladytron and Louisahhh.

== Directing ==
- Offend Maggie by the band Deerhoof (2008)
- Front My Hope by the band Hawnay Troof (2008)
- Ear Ever Hear by the band XBXRX (2008)
- "Everything Is" by the band Hawnay Troof (2009)
- "What Dreams?" by the band Signals (2010)
- "Years Not Long" by the band Male Bonding (2010)
- Fake Drugs by the band Hollerado (2010)
- "theFUNsun" by the band Slow Animal (2010)
- "Throwing Shade" by the band Abe Vigoda (2010)
- "Candy" by the band Frankie Rose and The Outs (2010)
- "Little Trouble Girl" by the band Free Moral Agents (2010)
- "Rain" by the band KIT (2010)
- "Ambrosia" by the band KIT (2011)
- "Mud" by the singer Peaches (2011)
- "Junky for Her" by the band Cerebral Ballzy (2011)
- "A Commotion" by the band Feistodon, a collaboration between Feist and Mastodon (2012)
- "Please Be My Third Eye" by the band La Sera (2012)
- "Burst" by the singer Peaches (2012)
- "My Love Won't Wait" by the band Two Gallants (2012)
- "Untitled Echos" by the band Deerhoof (2012)
- "Lost In A Dream" by the singer Vice Cooler (2012)
- "Put A Light On" by the band Generationals (2013)
- "Atlantis" by the band STRFKR (2013)
- "City Slickers' Night Pressure" by the band Go Chic (2013)
- "Late Descent #2" by Sonic Youth member Lee Ranaldo (2014)
- "The Creature" by the band La Luz (2018)

== Discography ==
=== Production and songwriting credits ===
Title	Year	Artist	Album	Credits
"Hit It Hard"	2006	Peaches	Impeach My Bush	Co Writer
"Close Up" (Featuring Kim Gordon)	2015	Peaches	Rub	Co Writer, Producer
"Rub"	2015	Peaches	Rub	Co Writer, Producer
"Dick in the Air"	2015	Peaches	Rub	Co Writer, Producer
"Pickles"	2015	Peaches	Rub	Co Writer, Producer
"Sick in the Head"	2015	Peaches	Rub	Co Writer, Producer
"Free Drink Ticket"	2015	Peaches	Rub	Co Writer, Producer
"How You Like My Cut"	2015	Peaches	Rub	Co Writer, Producer
"Vaginoplasty"	2015	Peaches	Rub	Co Writer, Producer
"Dumb Fuck"	2015	Peaches	Rub	Co Writer, Producer
"I Mean Something" (Featuring Feist)	2015	Peaches	Rub	Co Writer, Producer
"Bodyline" (Featuring Nick Zinner)	2015	Peaches	Adult Swim Singles Club	Co Writer, Producer, Mixer
"Exercise in Self Compassion"	2018	Ah Mer Ah Su	Star	Co Writer, Producer, Mixer
"On"	2018	Ah Mer Ah Su	Star	Co Writer, Producer, Mixer
"Be Free"	2018	Ah Mer Ah Su	Star	Co Writer, Producer, Mixer
"Expectation"	2018	Ah Mer Ah Su	Star	Co Writer, Producer, Mixer
"7-15-13"	2018	Ah Mer Ah Su	Star	Co Writer, Producer, Mixer
"Perfect"	2018	Ah Mer Ah Su	Star	Co Writer, Producer, Mixer
"Men"	2018	Ah Mer Ah Su	Star	Co Writer, Producer, Mixer
"Heartbreaker"	2018	Ah Mer Ah Su	Star	Co Writer, Producer, Mixer
"Boys"	2018	Ah Mer Ah Su	Star	Co Writer, Producer, Mixer
"Stale Water"	2018	Ah Mer Ah Su	Star	Co Writer, Producer, Mixer
"Need You, Need Me"	2018	Ah Mer Ah Su	Star	Co Writer, Producer, Mixer
"Powerful"	2018	Ah Mer Ah Su	Star	Co Writer, Producer, Mixer
"Kids"	2018	Ah Mer Ah Su	Star	Co Writer, Producer, Mixer
"Do It Again"	2018	Nezzy	N/A	Co Writer, Producer, Mixer
"Convincing People"	2018	Peaches	Various Artist Compilation	Co Writer, Producer, Mixer
"Paper Highways"	2019	Ladytron	Ladytron	Co Writer, Producer
"Horrorscope"	2019	Ladytron	Ladytron	Co Writer, Producer
"Feral Rhythm"	2019	Louisahhh	Feral Rhythm (Single)	Co Writer, Producer, Mixer
"Solid Gold Easy Action"	2020	Nick Cave / Peaches	Angelheaded Hipster (Single)	Programmed By, Synthesizers
"Love Is a Punk"	2021	Louisahhh	The Practice of Freedom	Co Writer, Producer
"Like a Shot"	2021	Louisahhh	The Practice of Freedom	Co Writer, Producer
"Chaos"	2021	Louisahhh	The Practice of Freedom	Co Writer, Producer
"Ferocious (Contained)"	2021	Louisahhh	The Practice of Freedom	Co Writer, Producer
"Master"	2021	Louisahhh	The Practice of Freedom	Co Writer, Producer
"No Pressure"	2021	Louisahhh	The Practice of Freedom	Co Writer, Producer
"Not Dead"	2021	Louisahhh	The Practice of Freedom	Co Writer, Producer
"Numb, Undone"	2021	Louisahhh	The Practice of Freedom	Co Writer, Producer
"Corrupter"	2021	Louisahhh	The Practice of Freedom	Co Writer, Producer
"A Hard No"	2021	Louisahhh	The Practice of Freedom	Co Writer, Producer
"Hunter / Wolf"	2021	Louisahhh	The Practice of Freedom	Co Writer, Producer
"Temperamental"	2021	Ah Mer Ah Su	Hopefully Limitless	Co Writer, Producer, Mixer
"No One"	2021	Ah Mer Ah Su	Hopefully Limitless	Co Writer, Producer, Mixer
"We Got It All"	2021	Ah Mer Ah Su	Hopefully Limitless	Co Writer, Producer, Mixer
"Fantasy"	2021	Ah Mer Ah Su	Hopefully Limitless	Co Writer, Producer, Mixer
"Tomorrow"	2021	Ah Mer Ah Su	Hopefully Limitless	Co Writer, Producer, Mixer
"Make Me"	2021	Louisahhh	The Practice of Freedom (Deluxe)	Co Writer, Producer, Mixer
"Abstract Blues"	2021	Kim Gordon & J Mascis	Abstract Blues	Vocal Engineer (Kim Gordon)
"Another Road"	2021	Ray Aggs & Vice Cooler	Hilda and the Mountain King Soundtrack	Co Writer, Producer, Mixer
"Decoder Ring (With Katie Alice Greer)"	2022	Erica Dawn Lyle & Vice Cooler	Land Trust: Benefit for NEFOC	Co Writer, Producer, Mixer
"Lost in Thought" (With The Linda Lindas & Kathi Wilcox	2022	Erica Dawn Lyle & Vice Cooler	Land Trust: Benefit for NEFOC	Co Writer, Producer, Mixer
"Mirrorball" (With Kathleen Hanna)	2022	Erica Dawn Lyle & Vice Cooler	Land Trust: Benefit for NEFOC	Co Writer, Producer, Mixer
"Debt Collector" (With Kim Gordon)	2022	Erica Dawn Lyle & Vice Cooler	Land Trust: Benefit for NEFOC	Co Writer, Producer, Mixer
"Soul Fire Farm" (With Alice Bag & Emily Retsas)	2022	Erica Dawn Lyle & Vice Cooler	Land Trust: Benefit for NEFOC	Co Writer, Producer, Mixer
"The Immortals" (With Brontez Purnell)	2022	Erica Dawn Lyle & Vice Cooler	Land Trust: Benefit for NEFOC	Co Writer, Producer, Mixer
"Can't Fight Me" (With Ah-Mer-Ah-Su)	2022	Erica Dawn Lyle & Vice Cooler	Land Trust: Benefit for NEFOC	Co Writer, Producer, Mixer
"AGAVE" (With the Raincoats)	2022	Erica Dawn Lyle & Vice Cooler	Land Trust: Benefit for NEFOC	Co Writer, Producer, Mixer
"Break a Window" (With Ray Aggs & Emily Retsas)	2022	Erica Dawn Lyle & Vice Cooler	Land Trust: Benefit for NEFOC	Co Writer, Producer, Mixer
"Flashes of Knowing" (With Christina Billotte)	2022	Erica Dawn Lyle & Vice Cooler	Land Trust: Benefit for NEFOC	Co Writer, Producer, Mixer
"Cracks in the Ceiling" (With Ali Carter & Emily Retsas)	2022	Erica Dawn Lyle & Vice Cooler	Land Trust: Benefit for NEFOC	Co Writer, Producer, Mixer
"Star Fuck" (With Louisahhh)	2022	Erica Dawn Lyle & Vice Cooler	Land Trust: Benefit for NEFOC	Co Writer, Producer, Mixer
"Bodies" (With Kelley Deal, Emily Retsas & Sarah Register)	2022	Erica Dawn Lyle & Vice Cooler	Land Trust: Benefit for NEFOC	Co Writer, Producer, Mixer
"PS Forever" (With Satomi Matsuzaki)	2022	Erica Dawn Lyle & Vice Cooler	Land Trust: Benefit for NEFOC	Co Writer, Producer, Mixer
"Never Was" (With Ivy Jeanne & Mike Watt)	2022	Erica Dawn Lyle & Vice Cooler	Land Trust: Benefit for NEFOC	Co Writer, Producer, Mixer
"Hearing Myself Again" (With Palberta, Anne Wood & Emily Retsas)	2022	Erica Dawn Lyle & Vice Cooler	Land Trust: Benefit for NEFOC	Co Writer, Producer, Mixer
"Time's Arrow"	2023	Ladytron	Time's Arrow	Co Writer, Producer
"Flight from Angkor"	2023	Ladytron	Time's Arrow	Co Writer, Producer
"Jabouckie"	2023	Brontez Purnell	Jabouckie	Producer, Mixer
"Aneurysm"	2023	Brontez Purnell	Jabouckie	Producer, Mixer
