= Dorothée Munyaneza =

British-Rwandan singer, actress, dancer and choreographer (born 1982)

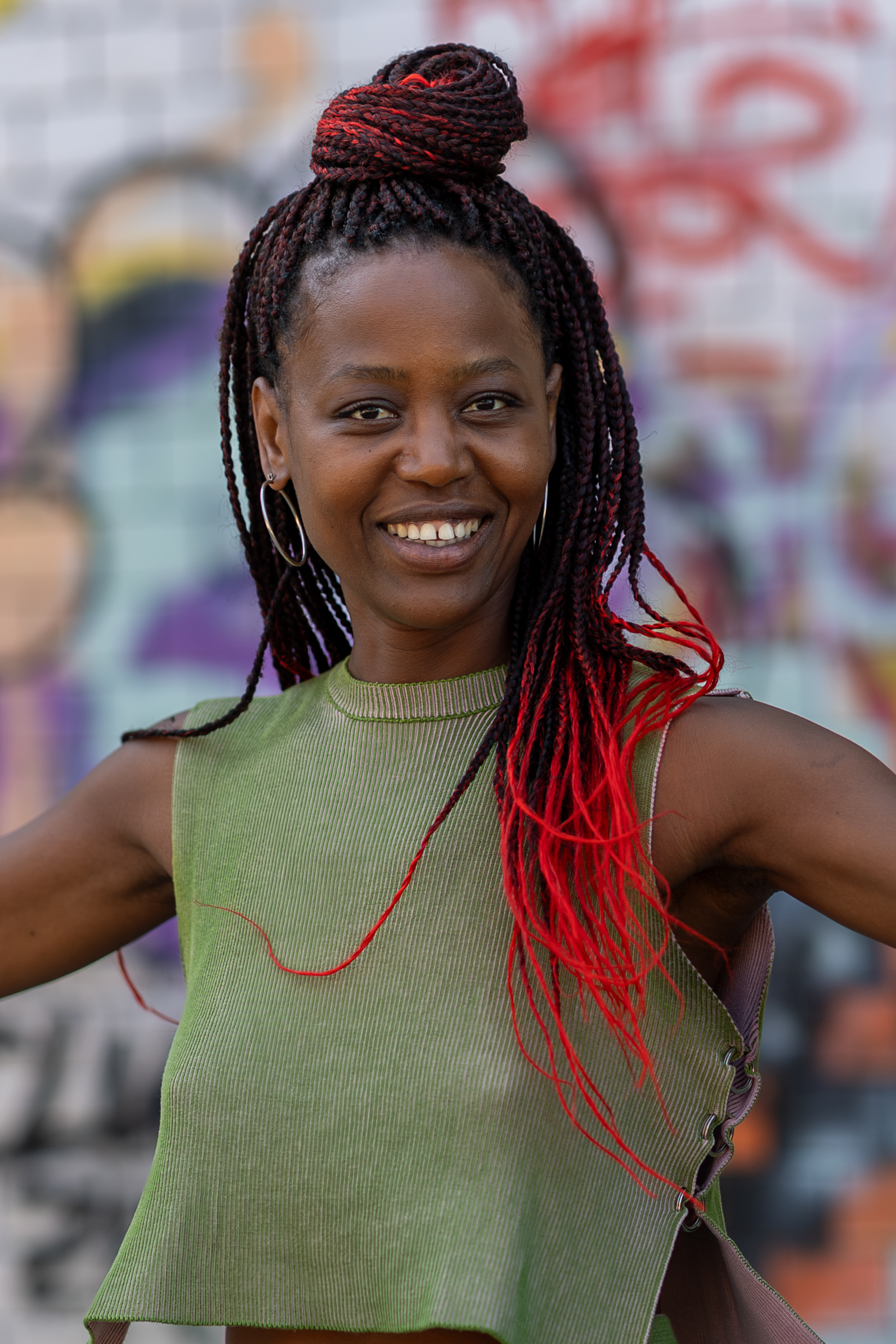
- Dorothée Munyaneza at Zürcher Theatre Spektakel in 2025
- Born: 1982 (age 43–44); Kigali, Rwanda
- Citizenship: Rwanda; United Kingdom
- Education: Lycée Français Charles de Gaulle Canterbury Christchurch University
- Occupations: Singer; Actress; Dancer; Choreographer
- Years active: 2004–
- Notable work: Samedi Détente; Unwanted

Dorothée Munyaneza (born 1982) is a British-Rwandan singer, actress, dancer and choreographer. She has produced two performance pieces, Samedi Détente and Unwanted, both about the Genocide against the Tutsi.

== Personal life ==
Munyaneza was born in Rwanda. Her father is a pastor, and her mother is a journalist. Munyaneza, aged 12, settles with her family in the summer of 1994 after the genocide against the Tutsi in Rwanda, in England. Her mother worked for a non-governmental organisation, and was therefore able to secure the family a safe passage to London. There she studied at the Lycée Français Charles de Gaulle. Whilst studying, she met Christine Sigwart, founder of the Jonas Foundation, a charity that aims to help children of various backgrounds. She became interested in music, and studied music at the Jonas Foundation. Munyaneza studied music and social sciences at Canterbury Christ Church University. She now lives in Marseille, France,

== Career ==
Munyaneza sang on the sound track for the Hotel Rwanda film. She worked with François Verret, Robyn Orlin, Rachid Ouramdane, Nan Goldin, Mark Tompkins, Ko Murobushi and Alain Buffard. As a singer, she released her first solo album in 2010, which was produced by Martin Russell. In 2012, she collaborated with British composer James Seymour Brett to produce the album Earth Songs. In 2013, she starred in a performance by Rachid Ouramdane in Rennes, France. During the performance, she chanted the names of Algerians killed during the Paris massacre of 1961.

In 2014, Munyaneza produced the work Samedi Détente (Saturday relaxation). It focused upon the genocide against the Tutsi in Rwanda in 1994, during which more than 800,000 Tutsi were exterminated in 100 days, and her own personal experience of the genocide. The work debuted in Nîmes, France.

In 2017, she produced Unwanted, her second work about the genocide against the Tutsi in Rwanda. The work featured French composer Alain Mahé, and focused on interviews between Munyaneza and women survivors of the genocide, as well as diving into archives of women who went through the same ordeals in Congo, Chad, Syria, and the countries that were formerly part of the SFR Yugoslavia. Unwanted has a particular focus on women victims of rape and their conceived children. Munyaneza presented Unwanted at the 2017 Festival d'Avignon, and also at the Festival d'automne à Paris.
