= Hunx and His Punx =

American punk band

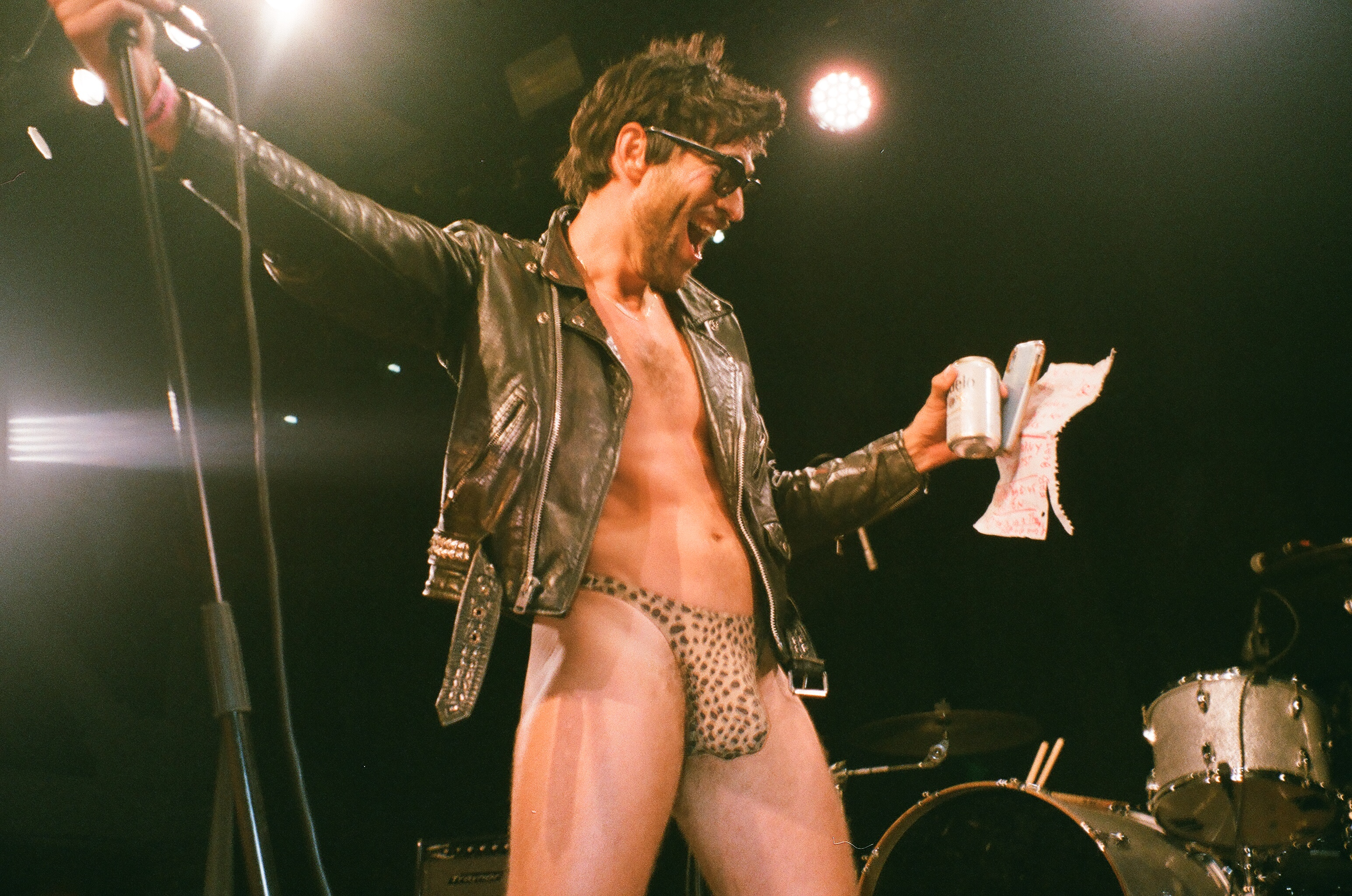
- Hunx and His Punx at Elsewhere, Brooklyn in 2019

Background information
- Origin: San Francisco and Los Angeles, California, United States
- Genres: Punk rock, queercore
- Instruments: Vocals, guitar, bass guitar, piano, keyboards, drums, percussion
- Years active: 2008–present
- Labels: Hardly Art, True Panther Sounds, Get Better Records
- Members: Seth Bogart; Shannon Shaw; Erin Emslie
- Past members: Amy Blaustein; Justin Champlin; Heather Fedewa; Nik Johnson; Michelle Santamaria

Hunx and His Punx is an American punk band from San Francisco, California.

== History ==
=== Origins ===
Hunx, real name Seth Bogart, started the band in 2008 after years of performing in the pop group Gravy Train!!!!. The group's sound has been compared to 1960s girl groups and is a blend of punk and bubblegum music. The band played its first national tour of the United States alongside Jay Reatard and Nobunny in 2009. Their debut singles compilation album, Gay Singles, was released in 2010 on True Panther Sounds in the U.S. and Born Bad in France.

=== New line-up ===
In January 2010, Hunx began touring with an all-female backing band. This configuration was identified on tour and in new songs such as "Lovers Lane" as Hunx and His Punkettes.

In March 2010, the band performed at a tribute concert for the recently deceased Jay Reatard. In May 2010, LensCrafters aired a commercial featuring a brief audio clip of the track "Gimmie Gimmie Back Your Love". In October 2010, the band signed to Hardly Art. Their debut full-length album for the label, Too Young to Be in Love, was released in April 2011. It was produced in New York City by Ivan Julian of Richard Hell and the Voidoids.

=== Breakup ===
In June 2011, Hunx announced that the group would be playing its final show with the "Punkettes", following the departure of guitarists Amy Blaustein and Michelle Santamaria. Bogart then relocated to Los Angeles.

In February 2012, Bogart released a solo album, Hairdresser Blues, on Hardly Art. A second solo album, Seth Bogart, was issued in 2016 on Burger Records, featuring collaborations with Kathleen Hanna and Tavi Gevinson.

=== Reunion and Walk Out on This World (2019–present) ===
Hunx and His Punx, now consisting of Seth Bogart, Shannon Shaw, and Erin Emslie, released the album Street Punk in 2013, and toured with new guitarist Nik Johnson. In 2014, they released a greatest hits album for the Japanese leg of the Street Punk tour.

The band reunited again in 2019 and began working on new material. During this period, they faced several personal challenges, including the death of Shaw's fiancé and a fire at Bogart's home. Despite these setbacks, they completed their fourth studio album, Walk Out on This World, which is scheduled for release on August 22, 2025, via Get Better Records. Its lead single, "Alone in Hollywood on Acid", was released with a music video directed by Sandy Honig. A North American tour is scheduled to follow, beginning in Seattle on August 26 and concluding in Los Angeles on September 27, 2025.

== Discography ==
=== Studio albums ===
- Too Young to Be in Love, Hardly Art, 2011
- Street Punk, Hardly Art, 2013
- Greatest Hits, Violet and Claire (Japan), 2014
- Walk Out on This World, Get Better Records, 2025

=== Singles ===
- "Gimmie Gimmie Back Your Love", Rob's House, 2009
- "Good Kisser" / "Cruisin", Bachelor Records, 2009
- "Hey Rocky", Bubbledumb, 2010
- "Teardrops on My Telephone", Shattered, 2010
- "Don't Cha Want Me Back?", True Panther Sounds, 2010
- "White Lipstick" / "Lose My Mind", Sub Pop, 2022
- "Alone in Hollywood on Acid", Get Better Records, 2025
- "No Way Out", Get Better Records, 2025

=== Compilations ===
- Gay Singles, True Panther Sounds, 2010
