= Gravy Train!!!! =

American electroclash band active in the 2000s

- Origin: Oakland, California
- Genres: Electroclash, electropop, LGBT music
- Years active: 2001–c.2010
- Labels: Cochon Records; Kill Rock Stars; Retard Disco
- Spinoffs: Hunx and His Punx; Seth Bogart; The Younger Lovers
- Past members: Chunx (Heather Jewett); Funx (Carolina); Hunx (Seth Bogart); Junx (Brontez Purnell); Drunx (Lauren Hay)

Gravy Train!!!! were an electroclash band from Oakland, California. The band released material on the labels S.P.A.M. Records, Cold Crush, Kill Rock Stars, Cochon Records, and Retard Disco. The band had four members, that went by the pseudonyms Chunx, Funx, Hunx, and Junx. Chunx and Funx formed the band in 2001 as a vehicle for recording humiliating songs about an ex-lover. It was for this purpose that their first single, "Hella Nervous", was recorded. Shortly after, the two-piece recruited two openly gay backup dancers, Hunx and Drunx. Drunx was later replaced by Junx.

Gravy Train!!!! toured with Bratmobile and Le Tigre.

== Discography ==
=== Albums ===
- Hello Doctor (2003)
- Are You Wigglin? (2005)
- All the Sweet Stuff (2007)

=== Singles ===
- "Ghost Boobs" (2004)

=== EPs ===
- The "Menz" (2002)

=== DVDs ===
- Stame the Batch! (2004)
