= Brontez Purnell =

American writer, musician, dancer, and director

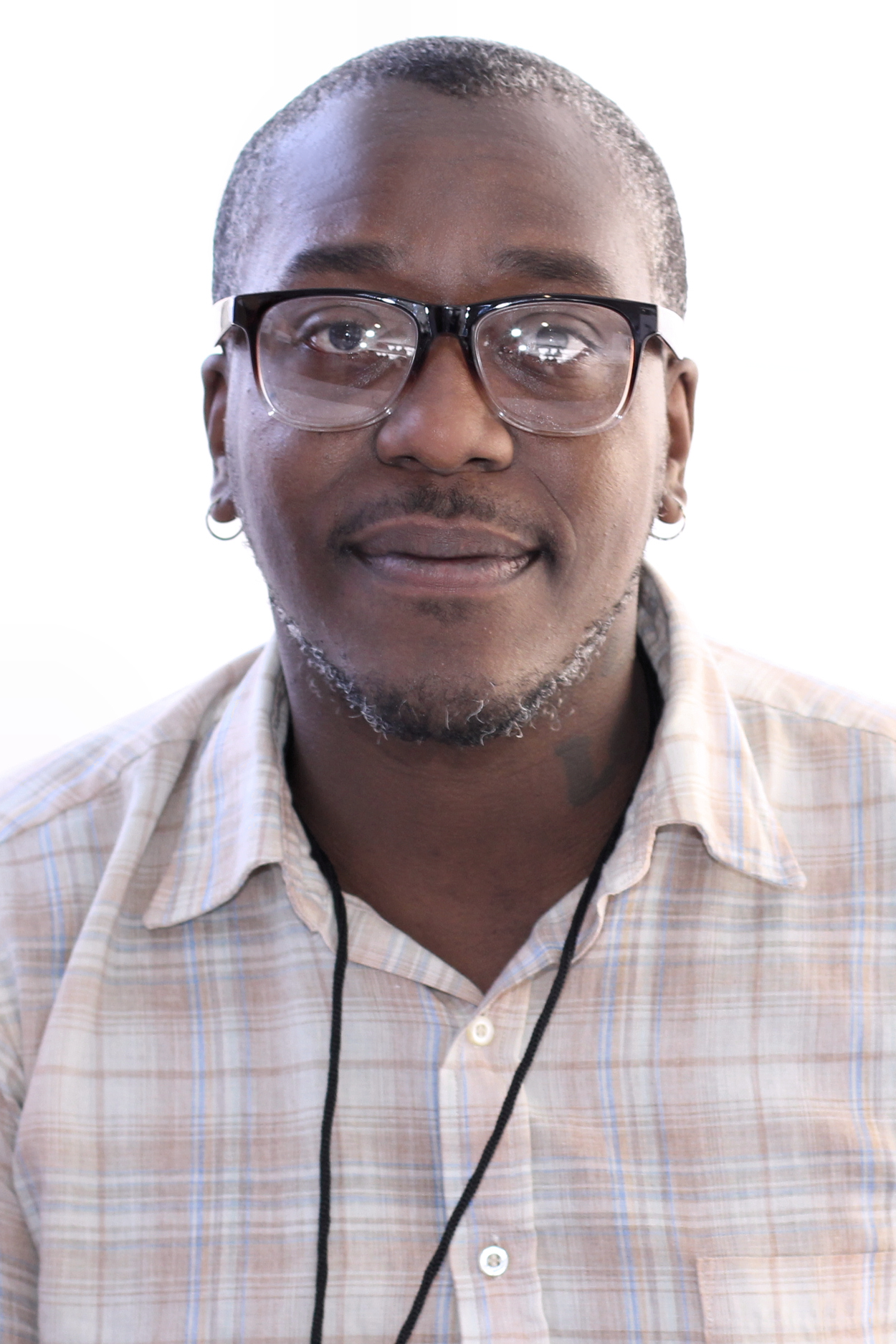
- Purnell at the 2018 Texas Book Festival
- Born: July 2, 1982 (age 42); Triana, Alabama, U.S.
- Occupation(s): Author, musician, dancer
- Years active: 2003–present
- Notable work: Since I Laid My Burden Down
- Awards: 2018 Whiting Award

Brontez Purnell (born July 2, 1982) is an American writer, musician, dancer, and director based out of Oakland, California. He is the author of several award-winning books, including Since I Laid My Burden Down (2017), 100 Boyfriends (2022), which won a Lambda Literary Award for Gay Fiction, and the punk zine Fag School. Purnell is the frontman for the punk band The Younger Lovers and is the founder of the Brontez Purnell Dance Company.

== Early life and education ==
Purnell grew up in Triana, Alabama. His great-grandfather, "Hard Rock" Charlie Malone, an accomplished bottleneck guitarist who played the Chitlin' Circuit from Chattanooga to Chicago in the 1930s, was the father of the musician J.J. Malone. Purnell created his first zine, Schlepp Fanzine, at the age of 14.

== Work ==
After moving to Oakland at 19, he created Fag School out of "wanting there to be a Sassy for gay boys." "I hadn't really seen a zine or at least a personal gay zine that dealt with the difficult subject of gay sex with both humor and frank talk. It covered some real issues."

His electro rock band Gravy Train!!!! gained national prominence for their live shows. His punk band The Younger Lovers started in 2003 as a bedroom demo project.

Purnell has created music under his own name since 2020. On July 19, 2023, Purnell released his solo album No Jack Swing. When asked to describe the album, he said that "I [...] allowed myself to just be a pretty Black boy making a pop record—and like, why the fuck shouldn't I?"

== Awards ==
In 2018, Purnell was awarded a Whiting Award for fiction.

In 2022, Purnell was awarded the Robert Rauschenberg Award for Performance Art/Theater, and the Lambda Literary Award for Best Gay Fiction.

On June 1, 2021, he was named a winner of the Jim Duggins Outstanding Mid-Career Novelists' Prize from the Lambda Literary Foundation.

== Themes ==
Much of his work focuses on sex and sexuality. "In my work I try to use 'sex' or the body as this thing that does not create boundaries or separation with an audience, but instead gives my audience back their humanity." He is gay.

== Bibliography ==
- The Cruising Diaries (2014)
- Johnny Would You Love Me if My Dick Were Bigger (2015)
- Since I Laid My Burden Down (2017)
- 100 Boyfriends (2021)
- 10 Bridges I've Burnt (2024)
