= Seth Bogart =

American artist (born 1980)

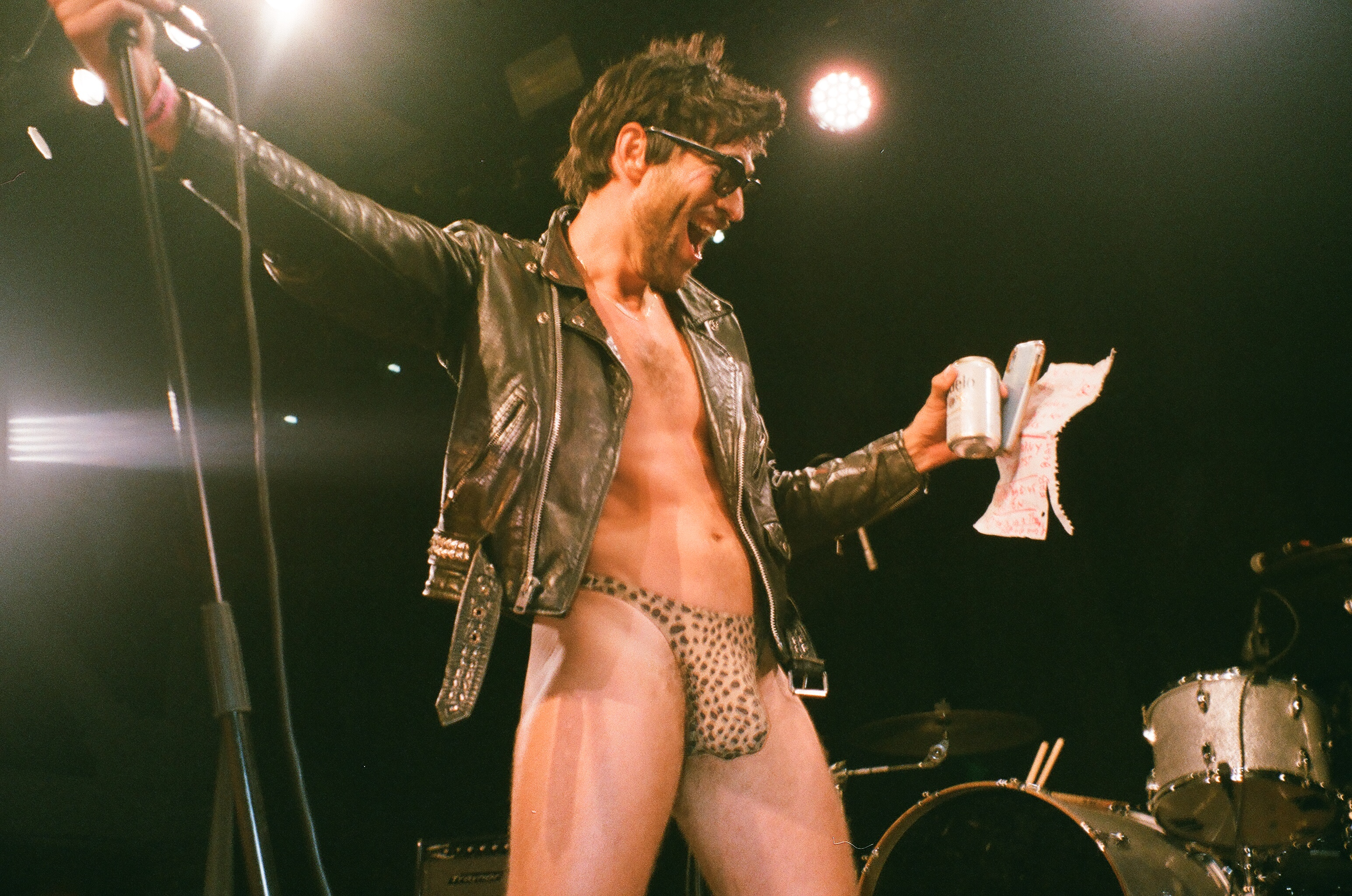
- Bogart in 2019
- Born: Seth Davis Bogard; February 28, 1980 (age 46); Tucson, Arizona, U.S.
- Occupations: Artist; musician
- Years active: 1995–present
- Known for: Music, painting, ceramics
- Musical career
- Also known as: Hunx
- Genres: Garage punk, queercore, indie rock, electroclash
- Website: sethbogart.com

Seth Bogart, born Seth Davis Bogard (February 28, 1980), is an American multidisciplinary artist. As a musician, he is known for his solo work and as a member of the bands Hunx and His Punx and Gravy Train!!!!. As a visual artist, Bogart's paintings and sculptures have been exhibited in galleries across the United States. He created the World of Wonder web series Feelin' Fruity and operates the streetwear label Wacky Wacko.

Pitchfork named Bogart the "New King of Camp" in 2016.

== Early life and career ==
Bogart grew up in Tucson, Arizona, where his father was a lawyer and his mother was a nurse. In high school, he started playing the guitar and created the punk zine Puberty Strike. He later produced the zine Psycho No. 1 Fan.

When Bogart was 17, his father committed suicide. He moved to Oakland, California shortly thereafter. At 19, he studied cosmetology at Laney College, and later, in 2006, he co-founded the salon and vintage clothing store Down at Lulu's on Telegraph Avenue in Oakland.

== Music ==
As a teenager in the mid-1990s, Bogart created the record label Heroes for Today, which put out albums by indie bands and distributed zines. In the late 1990s, Bogart created the record label Super Eight Underground, which put out albums both by and featuring indie bands such as The Causey Way, Deep Lust, The Mooney Suzuki, The Rondelles, Scared of Chaka, and Skinned Teen. He closed the label in 2000.

Bogart joined Oakland-based electroclash band Gravy Train!!!! as a backup dancer under the name Hunx shortly after its inception in the early 2000s. He soon began writing songs for the band and performing as the band's singer and guitarist.

In 2008, he founded Hunx and His Punx, a garage punk band, which changed its lineup in 2010 and was renamed to Hunx and His Punkettes. After this lineup disbanded in 2011, Bogart sold Down at Lulu's.

In 2012, Bogart released a solo album as Hunx titled Hairdresser Blues, and, in 2015, Bogart came out with an eponymous solo album under his own name. 2020 saw the release of his "Boys Who Don't Wanna Be Boys" and a remix version of the same album.

== Clothing ==
Bogart relocated to Los Angeles in 2013, and, in 2014, he started streetwear label Wacky Wacko. Initially, it was to be a record label, until he lost interest in that idea. The line grew in popularity, and could be seen on Miley Cyrus, Tavi Gevinson, and Kathleen Hanna. From 2014 to 2017, the label had a store on Sunset Boulevard in Echo Park. During this time, his work was imitated by fast fashion retailer Zara.

Bogart has also collaborated with fashion house Saint Laurent. Director Hedi Slimane was a fan of Bogart's work, and used his drawings in a Saint Laurent fabric pattern entitled "Hunx notebook," and a song by Hunx and His Punx in a promotional video.

== Video ==
In 2011, Bogart and collaborator Brande Bytheway launched a Kickstarter campaign to fund a TV show. Hollywood Nailz launched as a web series in November 2012, and was likened to a "bizarro '80s Public Access-style variety show".

In May 2018, World of Wonder launched the web series Feelin' Fruity, a variety show which starred Bogart, and was inspired by Disneyland's Toontown and Pee-wee's Playhouse. It featured such guests as Alice Bag, Kate Berlant, Tammie Brown, John Early, Cole Escola, Manila Luzon, and Allison Wolfe.

Bogart has also worked on music videos for other musicians. He directed Tegan and Sara's "U-Turn" (2016) and was the set designer for Trixie Mattel's "Yellow Cloud" (2019).

== Sculpture and paintings ==
S.C.U.M. Manifesto, a ceramic in Bogart's book-sculpture series

Bogart began taking classes at ArtCenter College of Design in 2013, and began selling ceramic versions of familiar objects—including perfume bottles and grooming supplies—at the Wacky Wacko store shortly thereafter.

In 2014, Los Angeles art gallery 356 Mission included a painting by Bogart in a group show, and, in 2015, 356 Mission gave him a solo show, in which he transformed the gallery space into The Seth Bogart Show, an immersive experience that displayed sculpture, paintings, ceramics, and video, as well as served as a performance venue.

Nino Mier gave Bogart a show in their Los Angeles gallery in 2018. Entitled Lick, it transformed the space into a sex shop, and included paintings and ceramic pieces by Bogart.

In 2019, Chicago's Soccer Club Club gallery hosted 100 Toothbrushes, a solo exhibit of 100 ceramic toothbrushes by Bogart.

In 2020 and 2021, he crafted ceramic sculptures of books with significance in the LGBTQ+ community. These works were exhibited at New York City's Fierman Gallery and Jeffrey Deitch Gallery, and received international press.

== Personal life ==
Bogart is openly gay. He came out to his friends while in high school, and to his mother when he was age 18. In the early 2010s, Bogart dated fellow musician Daniel Pitout of Nü Sensae, the suspected true identity of country star Orville Peck.

== Discography ==
=== As Hunx and His Punx ===
==== Studio albums ====
- Too Young to Be in Love (2011)
- Street Punk (2013)

==== Compilations ====
- Gay Singles (2010)

=== As Hunx ===
==== Studio albums ====
- Hairdresser Blues (2012)

=== As H.U.N.X. ===
==== Singles ====
- I Vant to Suck (2012)

=== As Seth Bogart ===
==== Studio albums ====
- Seth Bogart (2016)
- Men on the Verge of Nothing (2020)

==== Singles ====
- "Eating Makeup" (2015) featuring Kathleen Hanna
- "Club with Me" (2016)
- "Boys Who Don't Wanna Be Boys" (2020)
- "Boys Who Don't Wanna Be Boys – The Remixes" (2020)

=== As S.L.I.N.K. ===
==== Singles ====
- "Pink Christmas" (2014)

== Published works ==
=== Zines ===
- Puberty Strike. Heroes for Today. (c. 1996–98)
- Psycho No. 1 Fan. (undated; after Puberty Strike)
- Wacky Wacko Magazine. Vol. 1. Youth in Decline. 2015. OCLC 950976487.
- Wacky Wacko Magazine. Vol. 2. Youth in Decline. 2016.

=== Books ===
- Seth Bogart: Ceramics 2014–2016. Brain Dead Books. 2017.
- 100 Toothbrushes. Drag City. 2019.

== Exhibitions ==
=== Solo ===
- 2015 – The Seth Bogart Show, 356 Mission, Los Angeles
- 2018 – LICK, Nino Mier Gallery, Los Angeles
- 2019 – 100 Toothbrushes, Soccer Club Club, Chicago
- 2021 – Library Fantasy Volume 1, Fierman Gallery, New York City
- 2023 – Mondo Blondo Ceramica Sculptura, Fierman Gallery, New York City

=== Group ===
- 2010 – Total Trash, A440 Gallery, San Francisco
- 2014 – Another Cats Show, 356 Mission, Los Angeles
- 2014 – You're My Playground Love, KK Gallery, Los Angeles
- 2014 – Perfume Mania Installation, The Geffen Contemporary at MOCA, Los Angeles
- 2016 – Volatile! A Poetry and Scent Exhibition, Poetry Foundation, Chicago
- 2016 – THINGS: A Queer Legacy of Graphic Art & Play, ONE Archives, Los Angeles
- 2016 – THINGS: A Queer Legacy of Graphic Art & Play, Participant Inc., New York City
- 2017 – Last, Artist Curated Projects, Los Angeles
- 2018 – Tom House, Mike Kelley Mobile Homestead, Museum of Contemporary Art Detroit, Detroit
- 2019 – Circus of Books, Fierman Gallery, New York City
- 2020 – Heaven and Hell, Tom of Finland Foundation, Los Angeles
- 2020 – Circus of Books: Blowout, Fierman Gallery, New York City
- 2021 – Clay Pop, Jeffrey Deitch, New York City
- 2023 – Clay Pop Los Angeles, Jeffrey Deitch, Los Angeles
- 2023 – WARES! Extraordinary Ceramics and the Ordinary Home, Santa Barbara Museum of Art, Santa Barbara
- 2025 – 2025 California Biennial: Desperate, Scared, But Social, Orange County Museum of Art, Newport Beach

=== Curator ===
- 2021 – Wild Frontiers, The Pit, Los Angeles
