= Erase Errata =

American band

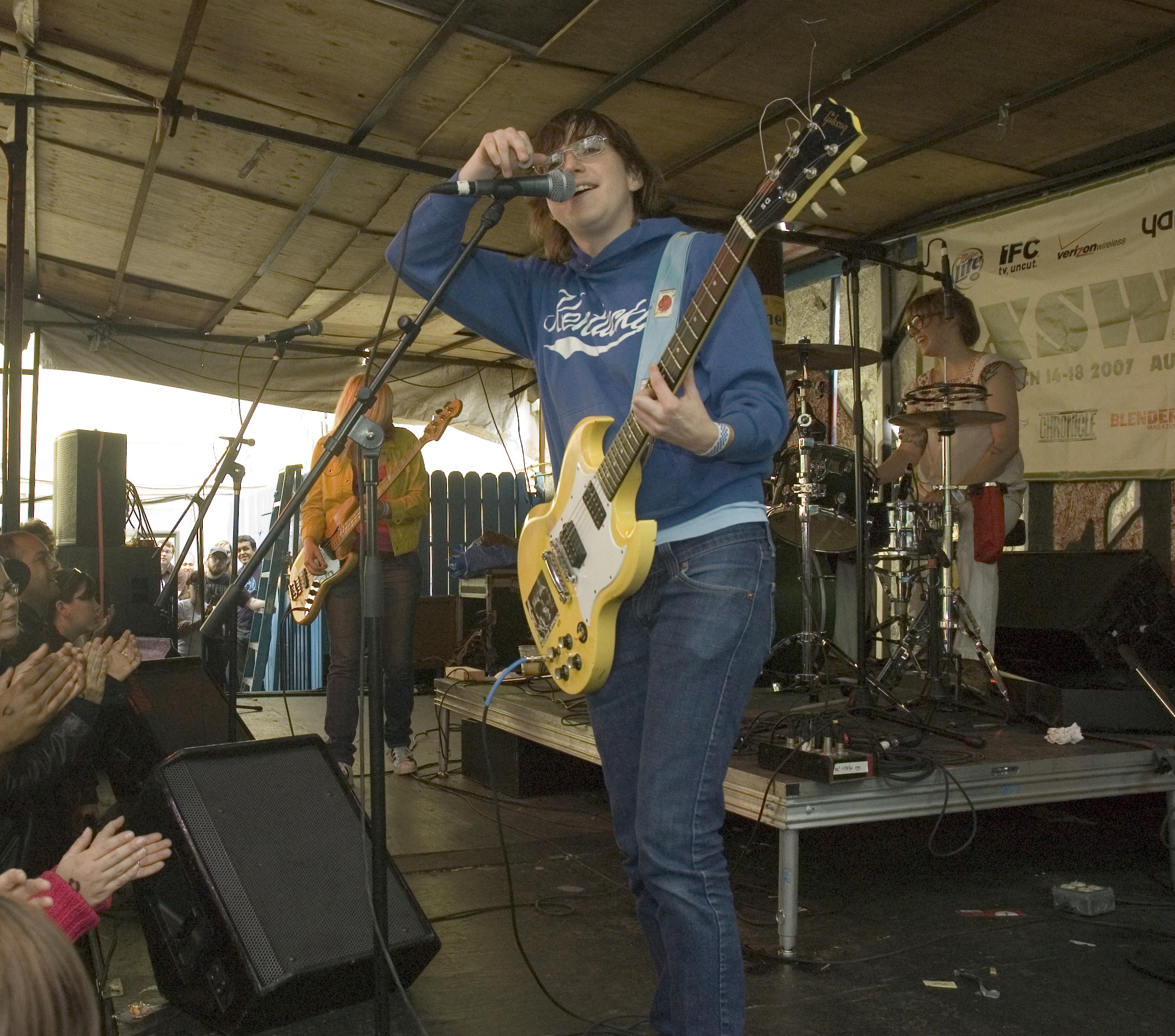
- Erase Errata performing during Mess with Texas.

Background information
- Origin: Oakland/San Francisco, California, U.S.
- Genres: Post-punk revival, alternative rock, noise rock, indie rock
- Years active: 1999–2015
- Labels: Troubleman Unlimited; Tsk! Tsk! Records; Blast First; Kill Rock Stars; Lungcast
- Members: Jenny Hoyston; Ellie Erickson; Bianca Sparta; Sara Jaffe; Archie McKay
- Website: www.eraseerrata.com

Erase Errata was a band from San Francisco, California.

== History ==
Erase Errata formed in Oakland, California, in 1999, and quickly earned national attention after the release of their first eponymous 7-inch single, and via tours with electro-riot grrrl band Le Tigre and Japanese noise-rockers Melt Banana.

They released their highly acclaimed debut album Other Animals in 2001, followed by At Crystal Palace in 2003, both on the Troubleman Unlimited label.

After founding guitarist Sara Jaffe left Erase Errata in 2004, singer Jenny Hoyston switched to guitar, and the group briefly drafted a vocalist named Archie McKay. The group eventually settled on a three-piece lineup, with Hoyston handling both guitar and vocal duties, and joined the Kill Rock Stars roster for the 2006 album Nightlife, which was hailed as “a high watermark for political punk music seeking to complicate the function of entertainment and give it an agenda for this century.”

The band then released what proved to be their final album, Lost Weekend, on Under the Sun records in 2015. The band broke up amicably after playing two final concerts in Austin, Texas, in October 2015.

== Personnel ==
- Jenny Hoyston - vocals, guitar, trumpet, keyboards
- Ellie Erickson - bass
- Bianca Sparta - drums
- Sara Jaffe - guitar (1999–2004, with sporadic live appearances thereafter)
- Archie McKay - vocals (July–August 2004)

== Discography ==
=== Studio albums ===
- Other Animals (2001)
- At Crystal Palace (2003)
- Nightlife (2006)
- Lost Weekend (2015)

=== Singles ===
- "Erase Errata" (2000) Inconvenient Press
- "The Structure of Scientific Misconceptions" (2001) Toyo
- 7" split single with Black Dice (2001) Troubleman
- 7" compilation feat. Erase Errata, Peaches, xbxrx, Tracy & the Plastics and more (2002) NFJM
- 7" split single with Numbers (2002) Tigerbeat6
- "Mariah Carey and the Arthur Doyle Hand Cream"/"Glitter" split single with Sonic Youth (2003) Narnack
- 7" split single with Gossip (2004) KRS
- 7" "Clear Spot" b/w "Pass The Crimson" (2007) TomLab
- 7" "Damaged" b/w "Ouijaboardin'" (2010) KRS

=== Compilations ===
- Rough Trade Shops: Post Punk Vol. 1, 2001
- Fields And Streams, Kill Rock Stars, 2002
