= Jenny Hoyston =

American producer, vocalist, guitarist

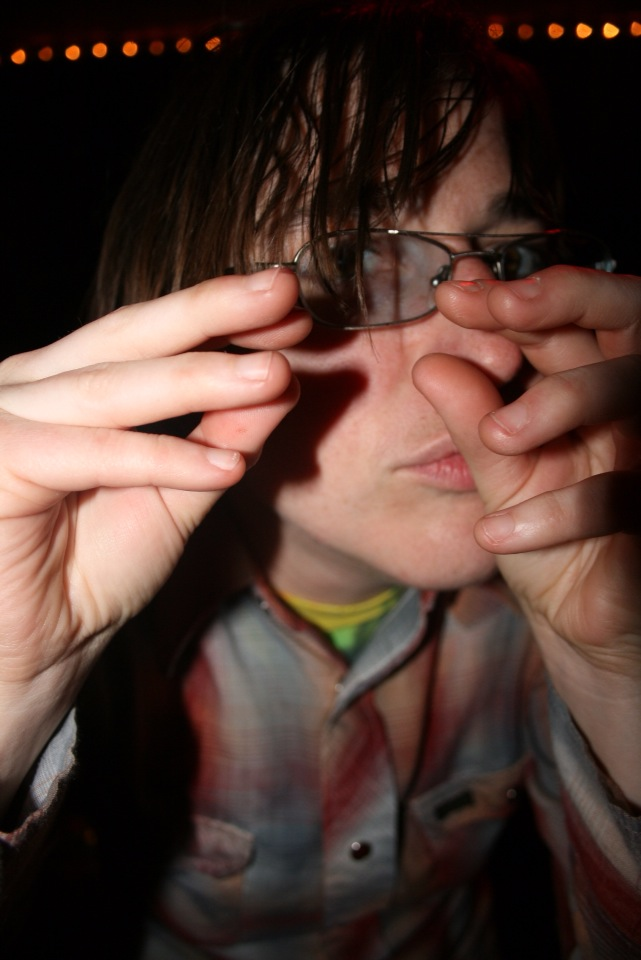
Jenny Hoyston

Jenny Hoyston is an American producer, vocalist, guitarist, and trumpeter based in Austin, Texas, United States. She composed, recorded, and toured as part of the San Francisco, California, political punk and no wave band Erase Errata from 1999 to 2015 and records and performs with William Elliott Whitmore as Hallways of Always, with former Erase Errata bandmate Ellie Erickson as Hey Jellie, and as a solo artist, at times under the name Paradise Island. She also co-produces FABULOSA Fest near Yosemite every year since 2008.

== Biography ==
Hoyston began her road and recording career in 1994 as the bassist and back-up vocalist for Michigan-based all-Women punk band, day twenty-eight, and appears on PEEP, the 1995 Youth Rendition Records release by the band.

After relocating to San Francisco, Hoyston formed noise-rock duo California Lightening with future Erase Errata drummer Bianca Sparta in 1997. California Lightening released singles on Troubleman Unlimited and Sound on Sound and appeared on releases by Mr. Lady Records and other independent labels. The duo also self-released This Is A True Story in a limited edition of 300 cassette tapes. In 2005, the band released Four Virgins, a split 7-inch with fellow San Franciscan duo Sic. Alps which stirred controversy over fully nude images of members of both bands on the record's artwork. In 1999 Hoyston joined Darkwave quintet Subtonix (Troubleman Unlimited) and is credited with guitar on one 7-inch release by the all-Women band.

Later in 1999, she formed Erase Errata with Sara Jaffe, Ellie Erickson and Sparta. The band was formed during an impromptu session at Club Hott, the warehouse venue Hoyston and Sparta inhabited with Seth Bogart (Gravy Train!!!!, Hunx and His Punx, Wacky Wacko) and Luis Illades (Pansy Division, Avengers). Other Erase Errata collaborators have included Christina Files, Weasel Walter, Eric Bauer, and Archie McKay. Erase Errata toured the U.S., Europe, Japan, Australia, and New Zealand. Erase Errata's final release was the Lost Weekend (2015) on their own label. The band played a string of dates in 2015 with Hannah Blilie of The Gossip and Lisa Schonberg (Explode Into Colors, Thao & the Get Down Stay Down) on double-drums and Mlee Marie of Houston-based Hearts of Animals on saxophone in addition to original members Erickson and Hoyston.

Hoyston's self-recorded and produced a solo LP for Dim Mak in 2003 under the project name Paradise Island, titled "Lines Are Infinitely Fine." In 2007, she released Isle Of under her own name on Southern Records. The LP received thumbs up in Rolling Stone, "Spin," and other music rags. In 2010, Hoyston was named one of the 50 Most Important Queer Women in Music by AfterEllen.com.

In addition to her work on stage and in the studio, Hoyston has produced the annual, women-centered FABULOSA Fest near Yosemite, California, since 2008. The event raises money for charity and features 6 days of bands, DJs, yoga, massage, camping, and swimming.

According to her Facebook page, she currently lives in Austin, Texas.

== Musical style ==
Erase Errata typically features no wave and angular punk styles. With the Paradise Island solo project Hoyston explores different sounds including off-kilter rock and pop, lo-fi electronica and folk.

== Discography ==
=== Hallways of Always ===
- S/T (2006) Southern Records
- Magical Mind (2010) Long Play Records
- Invisible Light (2019) Long Play Records

=== Paradise Island ===
- Purple Prize (2002) Troubleman Unlimited
- Getup (2003) Dim Mak
- Lines Are Infinitely Fine (2003) Dim Mak
- Beast (2005) Cochon
- Seeing Spots (2006) Southern UK/Latitudes

=== Jenny Hoyston ===
- Isle of (2007) Southern Records
- Hold On, Loosely (2019) Great Hereafter Music
