= Camille Davila =

American singer

Camille Dávila
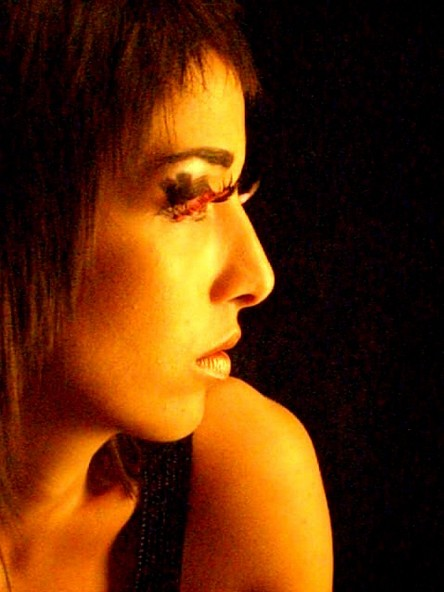

Background information
- Origin: Los Angeles, California, United States
- Genres: Electropop, electronic, glam rock, pop
- Occupations: Musician, songwriter, producer
- Instruments: Vocals, guitar, keyboards, synthesizers
- Years active: 2000–present
- Label: Below Records Poly Records Goodbye Records
- Website: www.camilledavila.com

Camille Dávila is an international songwriter, multi-instrumentalist, producer and performer. She is credited on Pop Levi's album The Return to Form Black Magick Party as a guest vocalist and, according to Allmusic, has three albums to her own name.

== Biography ==
Born in Los Angeles, California, United States, Camille Dávila spent most of her life in the West Coast and the last 6–7 years relocated in Europe, primarily England, Germany, and Norway. In 2000 she signed to Below Recordings to release her debut album Not for the Disco shortly before moving to Liverpool to study sound technology and continue her relationship with Below Recordings which re-located to Berlin, Germany. Two European tours followed, along with gobs of scattered European gigs and a second album "World of Gliding Monsters", produced in the UK, Norway and Germany. Camille is one of the few of her kind to take the reins on her projects, producing and arranging most of her tracks herself; in fact on some of her recordings she has even played every instrument. When choosing to collaborate, she played amongst some of Europe's finest musicians (including Stein Urheim of Steady Steele, Marius Simonsen of Pop Levi and Super Numeri and Pop Levi himself). Camille continued to play through a residency at Ladytron's famous Liverpool club "Korova" while popping up for "special appearance" gigs globally. Camille's surrounding company has always been of interest to die-hard fans, from playing with ex-Jeff Buckley drummer Eric Eidel, to working for an organization run by Stewart Brand, Brian Eno and others at The Long Now Foundation, to debuting her residency with her opening players the Zutons! In 2007, after a brief return to California to form a new band and play shows in America, Camille brought her band to London to record the album Hi-C. A music video for song "Wireless World" directed by Jacqueline Passmore (visual artist for bands such as Ladytron and Stereolab) was launched in October 2007 and toured several film festival circuits, including the BBC Norfolk Music Video Festival. After her third release, Davila was shortlisted by Channel4 for the 4Talent award in music in 2008. The album "Hi-C" was mastered in the Guillemots studio in London and released in 2008 on both CD and all digital retailers. In August 2009 Camille moved from London to Oslo, Norway to begin work on a top-secret project with Jeron Gundersen of Dibidim and "Bearfarm". This lead her to working with the famous Norwegian producer HP Gundersen (whose production credits include Sondre Lerche). This resulted in her newest release; "Divided Skies", released in 2013 by the Norwegian artist Heidi Goodbye on her label Goodbye Records. Her newest release has received accolades from the likes of Jeff Lynne (ELO), and Van Dyke Parks. On the making of Divided Skies, according to Goodbye Records: "HP Gundersen went to visit the band Bearfarm in Norway some time ago, where he heard recordings of Camille Davila and requested to meet her. Camille was living at the time in Oslo and went up to Bergen to say hello! He then helped her to start on this album by setting her up with a studio to record in, with a fabulous rhythm section (Mette Mathiesen and Daniel Birkeland) and a great experience jamming a bit with his project with Heidi Goodbye: The Last Hurrah!! After getting a solid rhythm section down, Camille took her recordings to Jonas Lie Theis and Jeron Gundersen in Oslo and the three of them began adding color and texture over beautiful Norwegian summer nights. Final touches where added after bringing those recordings to the famous Badminton Bay Studios (care of Jonas Raabe)." After a year spent back in California, Camille has relocated to Norfolk in the United Kingdom and continues to tour and promote her newest release.

== Discography ==
=== Albums ===
- Not for the Disco (2000, Below Recordings)
- World of Gliding Monsters (2004, Below Recordings)
- Hi-C (2008, Poly Records)
- Divided Skies (2013, Goodbye Records)

=== Contributions ===
- RCA Christmas EP Artist: Various Artists; Contributor (2002, RCA)
- The Return to Form Black Magick Party Artist: Pop Levi Vocals on track "Flirting" (2007, Counter Records)
