= Conflict & Catalysis: Productions & Arrangements 1966−2006 =

Conflict & Catalysis: Productions & Arrangements 1966–2006

Compilation album by John Cale
- Released: 27 February 2012
- Recorded: 1966−2006
- Genre: Rock
- Length: 1:17:03
- Label: Big Beat
- Producer: John Cale

Professional ratings
Review scores
Source	Rating
The Independent	4/5 stars

Conflict & Catalysis: Productions & Arrangements 1966–2006 is a compilation album by the Welsh musician John Cale released by Big Beat Records in February 2012. It features twenty songs from Cale-produced albums by other artists. It includes tracks from all decades in which he worked as a producer: the sixties (The Stooges), the seventies (Patti Smith), eighties (Happy Mondays), nineties (Siouxsie and the Banshees) and the new millennium (Alejandro Escovedo). The last song is "Spinning Away" from Cale's collaborative album with Brian Eno Wrong Way Up (1990).

== Track listing ==
No.	Title	Writer(s)	Original artist	Length
1.	"Venus in Furs"	Lou Reed	The Velvet Underground	5:11
2.	"I Wanna Be Your Dog"	Iggy Pop, Dave Alexander, Scott Asheton, Ron Asheton	The Stooges	3:26
3.	"In Excelsis Deo" / "Gloria"	Patti Smith / Van Morrison	Patti Smith	5:55
4.	"Afraid"	Nico	Nico	3:28
5.	"Pablo Picasso"	Jonathan Richman	The Modern Lovers	4:20
6.	"Who Is That Saving Me"	Tomney	Harry Toledo & The Rockets	3:29
7.	"Re-Bop"	Erik Fitoussi, Jean-Pierre Charriau, Marie Girard, Patrick Vidal	Marie et les Garçons	2:42
8.	"Disco Clone"	Ronald Melrose	Cristina	4:12
9.	"Italian Sea"	Ilene Rappaport	Chunky, Novi & Ernie	4:10
10.	"No King"	Christopher Blue, Evan Blackstone	Ventilator	5:36
11.	"Sex Master"	Chris Difford, Glenn Tilbrook	Squeeze	2:23
12.	"Take Your Place"	Alejandro Escovedo, Bruce Salmon, David Pulkingham, Hector Munoz, Jon Dee Graham, Mark Andes, Matt Fish, Susan Voelz	Alejandro Escovedo	3:12
13.	"Kuff Dam"	Happy Mondays	Happy Mondays	3:06
14.	"Runaway Child (Minors Beware)"	Ed Tomney	The Necessaries	2:36
15.	"Omnes Gentes Plaudite (The Drinking Song)"	Katharine Blake	Mediæval Bæbes	3:07
16.	"Needles for Teeth"	The Jesus Lizard	The Jesus Lizard	3:46
17.	"Scorch"	Goya Dress, Astrid Williamson	Goya Dress	3:40
18.	"Dallas"	Jay Alanski, Jacques Duvall	Lio	3:54
19.	"Tearing Apart"	Siouxsie and the Banshees	Siouxsie and the Banshees	3:23
20.	"Spinning Away"	John Cale, Brian Eno	Eno/Cale	5:27
