= Extended Play (Ladytron EP) =

2006 EP by Ladytron

EP by Ladytron
- Released: 11 April 2006
- Genre: Electropop; synthpop; new wave
- Length: 35:24
- Language: English; Bulgarian
- Label: Rykodisc
- Producer: Ladytron; Jim Abbiss

Ladytron chronology
| Witching Hour (2005) | Extended Play (2006) | The Harmonium Sessions (2006) |

Professional ratings
Review scores
| Source | Rating |
|---|---|
| AllMusic | 3/5 stars |
| Pitchfork | 4.0/10 |

Extended Play is the fourth extended play (EP) by English electronic music band Ladytron, released in the United States on 11 April 2006 by Rykodisc. The two-disc compilation features exclusive unreleased remixes and the UK B-sides from "Sugar" and "Destroy Everything You Touch", as well as a 35-minute bonus DVD.

== Track listing ==
=== CD ===
1. "High Rise" (Club Mix) – 6:09
2. "Nothing to Hide" – 3:51
3. "Weekend" (James Iha Mix) – 4:02
4. "Sugar" (Jagz Kooner Mix) – 5:25
5. "Citadel" – 3:54
6. "Destroy Everything You Touch" (Catholic Version) – 4:45
7. "Tender Talons" – 3:31
8. "Last One Standing" (Shipps & Tait Mix) – 3:47

=== DVD ===
1. "Destroy Everything You Touch"
2. "Sugar"
3. Once Upon a Time in the East: Ladytron in China

(Note: "USA vs. White Noise" is performed in its entirety at the end)

== Charts ==
| Chart (2006) | Peak position |
|---|---|
| US Top Dance/Electronic Albums (Billboard) | 19 |
