= Witching Hour (Ladytron album) =

2005 studio album by Ladytron

Studio album by Ladytron
- Released: 3 October 2005
- Recorded: April–June 2004
- Studios: Elevator, Liverpool; Sahara Sound, London
- Genres: Synth-pop; electronic rock; post-punk; shoegaze
- Length: 50:48
- Languages: English; Bulgarian
- Label: Island
- Producers: Jim Abbiss; Ladytron

Ladytron chronology
Softcore Jukebox (2003)	Witching Hour (2005)	Extended Play (2006)

Singles from Witching Hour
- 1. "Sugar" Released: 20 June 2005; 2. "Destroy Everything You Touch" Released: 19 September 2005; 3. "Weekend" Released: 2005; 4. "Soft Power" Released: 2007

Witching Hour is the third studio album by English electronic music band Ladytron, released on 3 October 2005 through Island Records internationally and Rykodisc in the United States. The album was promoted by four singles: "Sugar", "Destroy Everything You Touch", "Weekend" and "Soft Power".

Witching Hour received mostly positive reviews and reached number 81 on the UK Albums Chart. The album ranked at number 23 on Pitchfork's "Top 50 Albums of 2005", and at number 48 on NME's "Albums and Tracks of the Year 2005". In 2015, it was included on NME's list "50 Still-Awesome Albums That Made 2005 a Dynamite Year for Music". As of February 2008, the album had sold 50,000 copies in the United States, according to Nielsen SoundScan.

== Background and recording ==
Ladytron began working on demos for Witching Hour immediately after concluding Light & Magic tour with a homecoming gig in Liverpool in September 2003, where they were supported by Franz Ferdinand. Within a few months, they had mapped out the entire record. They began recording the album in April 2004 with Jim Abbiss at Elevator Studios in Liverpool, with later additional recording taking place at Sahara Sound in London. On the first day of the recording sessions, however, their UK label Telstar Records had gone into administration. Their US label, Emperor Norton, also had problems: the company was purchased by Rykodisc in 2004 and was then shut down later that year, with Rykodisc inheriting its back catalogue. By June 2004, the recording sessions were finished and the album only required mixing and mastering. The band announced on 7 December 2004 that they signed to Island Records.

== Composition ==
Musically, Witching Hour has been described as synth-pop, electronic rock, post-punk, and shoegaze. In a 2005 interview for XLR8R, Daniel Hunt shared some information about the equipment used on Witching Hour: "most of the bassy riffs are a Roland SH-2 or a Korg MS-20. Reuben especially likes sticking his Korg MS-10 through Electro Harmonix boxes and fattening them up. For the poly stuff, we used Farfisa organs and Solina string machines–basically the same stuff we've used all along, but we probably treated it a bit rougher. We also used a load of the producer's toys as well–Reuben's got an ARP 2600, which you can sit around with for a full day trying to get something useful out of and fail, and the next day you switch it on and it'll automatically make something genius. I've got this really shit, five-pound, sub-Casio keyboard that I got off this trader; the chords for 'International Dateline' were written on that. It's good to have that kind of gear. The shit toys can end up being quite inspirational".

Regarding their approach as producers, he also added: "our approach goes back to the whole Eno/Bowie Low thing – the treatments are as important as the synths. We like to confuse synths and guitars quite a lot–there are some things people hear they assume is a guitar that's a synth and vice versa. On the last album, there were guitars all over 'Cease2xist' and a few of the other songs, but they were treated in a way that people didn't recognize them".

== Release ==
Witching Hour was released through Island Records on 3 October 2005 in the United Kingdom and on 4 October in Europe. The release in the United States was done through Rykodisc. The initial pressings included the track "Witching Hour", not listed on back of the jewel case insert, at the end of the album, comprising 9 minutes and 3 seconds of complete silence. The silence track at the end of the album makes the album nearly one hour long, as a nod to the album's title. Some editions of the album also did not include the instrumental "CMYK". Additionally, Island released a limited edition containing a bonus DVD with the music videos of "Seventeen", "Sugar", "Destroy Everything You Touch", and the documentary Once Upon a Time in the East: Ladytron in China, detailing highlights of their 2004 tour across China.

Major Records released on 5 April 2007 in Europe a special edition of the album, including a bonus disc with remixes and B-sides. So Sweet Records did the same on 5 November 2007 in the United Kingdom and the United States, with a different bonus disc. The album was re-released by Nettwerk on 18 January 2011 in the United States and on 24 January 2011 in the United Kingdom. This edition included four additional remixes.

== Singles ==
"Destroy Everything You Touch"

Four singles were released from Witching Hour: "Sugar" on 20 June 2005, "Destroy Everything You Touch" on 19 September 2005, "Weekend" in 2005, and "Soft Power" in 2007. "International Dateline" was issued as a promotional single in 2005. "Destroy Everything You Touch" reached number 42 on the UK singles chart, the highest position a Ladytron single has reached to date. It also became the band's best known song.

The album was also promoted by two music videos: "Sugar" (directed by Andy Roberts) and "Destroy Everything You Touch" (directed by Adam Bartley). The unfinished video for "International Dateline" was rediscovered and finished by Daniel Hunt in 2012, and premiered on 22 February 2013. According to Daniel Hunt, the band wanted to make a video for "Soft Power", but the plans were abandoned.

== Critical reception ==
Professional ratings
Aggregate scores
Source	Rating
Metacritic	78/100
Review scores
Source	Rating
AllMusic	4/5 stars
The A.V. Club	Favourable
The Guardian	4/5 stars
NME	3.5/5 stars
Pitchfork	8.3/10
Playlouder	4/5 stars
PopMatters	8/10 stars
Stylus Magazine	B+
Tiny Mix Tapes	4.5/5 marks
Yahoo! Music UK	8/10 stars

Witching Hour received positive reviews from music critics. At Metacritic, which assigns a weighted mean rating out of 100 to reviews from mainstream critics, the album received an average score of 78, based on 21 reviews, which indicates "generally favorable reviews". Mark Pytlik of Pitchfork described the album as "the most urgent and immediate of their career" and also as a "quantum leap record". Edward Oculicz of Stylus Magazine wrote that "those who have loved Ladytron's move toward a mix of harsher electro and lighter pop elements will find this a welcome progression, and seemingly a natural one, too". Heather Phares of AllMusic commented that "Witching Hour is the album that Ladytron always seemed capable of, and its dark, dreamy-yet-catchy spell makes it the band's most sophisticated, and best, work to date".

The Guardian described the album as "their most humane work, with abrasive atmospherics akin to those of My Bloody Valentine". Keith Phipps of The A.V. Club felt that "The Witching Hour doesn't vary much from the pattern established by its predecessors, but it's every bit as beguiling". Adrien Begrand of PopMatters stated, "while Witching Hour has the band sounding more adventurous, there's a consistency to the tracks that holds it all together". NME described the album as "a record that rather makes one want to have sex". Kate Collier of Prefix Magazine wrote that "Ladytron's greatest accomplishment here is the atmosphere of cool beauty it creates immediately and maintains to the finish. It's rare for an album to transport you so fully onto its own terrain, and Witching Hour is a worthwhile retreat".

== Track listing ==
All music is composed by Ladytron (Mira Aroyo, Daniel Hunt, Helen Marnie, Reuben Wu).

Witching Hour — standard edition
No.	Title	Lyrics	Length
1.	"High Rise"	Daniel Hunt; Helen Marnie; Reuben Wu	4:54
2.	"Destroy Everything You Touch"	Hunt	4:36
3.	"International Dateline"	Hunt	4:17
4.	"Soft Power"	Hunt; Wu	5:19
5.	"CMYK"	Wu	1:49
6.	"AMTV"	Mira Aroyo; Hunt	3:26
7.	"Sugar"	Hunt	2:50
8.	"Fighting in Built Up Areas"	Aroyo; Hunt; Marnie; Wu	3:59
9.	"The Last One Standing"	Aroyo; Hunt; Marnie; Wu	3:11
10.	"Weekend"	Hunt	3:57
11.	"Beauty*2"	Marnie	4:23
12.	"Whitelightgenerator"	Aroyo; Hunt; Marnie; Wu	3:59
13.	"All the Way..."	Hunt	4:08
Total length:			50:48

Notes

- Initial CD pressings of the album include the unlisted track "Witching Hour" (9:03) following "All the Way...", bringing the total album duration to 59:51.
- Some European CD pressings of the album exclude the instrumental "CMYK".

=== Expanded editions ===
European special edition bonus disc
No.	Title	Length
1.	"High Rise" (Club Mix)	6:08
2.	"Nothing to Hide"	3:51
3.	"Weekend" (James Iha Mix)	4:00
4.	"Citadel"	3:48
5.	"Tender Talons"	3:28
6.	"Last One Standing" (Shipps & Tait Mix)	3:46
7.	"Soft Power" (Ebon's Strong Weakness Mix)	5:39
8.	"International Dateline" (Harmonium Session)	4:18

UK and US special editions bonus disc
No.	Title	Length
1.	"Soft Power" (Vicarious Bliss Gutter Mix)	6:48
2.	"Soft Power" (Loz & Brendan Long Remix)	7:39
3.	"International Dateline" (Simian Mobile Disco Remix)	5:42
4.	"Destroy Everything You Touch" (Hot Chip Remix)	6:52
5.	"Weekend" (James Iha Remix)	4:04
6.	"High Rise" (Ladytron Club Remix)	6:11
7.	"Sugar" (Jagz Kooner Remix)	5:27
8.	"Destroy Everything You Touch" (Playgroup Vocal Edit)	5:27
9.	"Nothing to Hide"	3:53
10.	"Citadel"	3:56
11.	"Tender Talons"	3:31

Nettwerk reissue bonus tracks
No.	Title	Length
14.	"Sugar" (Archigram Remix)	6:14
15.	"International Dateline" (Simian Mobile Disco Remix)	5:20
16.	"Destroy Everything You Touch" (Hot Chip Remix)	6:49
17.	"Soft Power" (Vicarious Bliss Gutter Remix)	6:45

== Witching Hour (Remixed & Rare) ==
On 20 December 2011, Nettwerk released a compilation of remixes, B-sides and rarities titled Witching Hour (Remixed & Rare). The cover is the negative of the Witching Hour cover.

No.	Title	Length
1.	"International Dateline" (Simian Mobile Disco Remix)	5:40
2.	"Weekend" (James Iha Mix)	4:02
3.	"Soft Power" (Vicarious Bliss Gutter Mix)	6:46
4.	"Destroy Everything You Touch" (Hot Chip Remix Edit)	6:50
5.	"Sugar" (Archigram Remix)	6:12
6.	"Citadel"	3:54
7.	"Nothing to Hide"	3:51
8.	"Soft Power" (Loz & Brendan Long Remix)	7:37
9.	"High Rise" (Club Mix)	6:09
10.	"Destroy Everything You Touch" (Playgroup Vocal Edit)	5:25
11.	"Tender Talons"	3:31

== Personnel ==
Credits adapted from the liner notes of Witching Hour.

Ladytron

- Helen Marnie
- Mira Aroyo
- Reuben Wu
- Daniel Hunt

Additional musicians

- Keith York – drums (uncredited)
- Pop Levi – bass (uncredited)

Technical

- Jim Abbiss – production
- Ladytron – production

Artwork

- Burneverything.co.uk – design, illustration
- Mira Aroyo – photograph
- Dean Chalkley – band photograph

== Charts ==
Chart (2005)	Peak position
Scottish Albums (Official Charts)	81
UK Albums (Official Charts)	81
UK Dance Albums (Official Charts)	2
US Top Dance Albums (Billboard)	7
US Independent Albums (Billboard)	40
US Heatseekers Albums (Billboard)	32

== Release history ==
Region	Date	Edition	Label	Ref.
United Kingdom	3 October 2005	Standard	Island	
Germany	4 October 2005	Standard	Universal Music	
United States	4 October 2005	Standard	Rykodisc	
Germany	5 April 2007	Special	Major	
United Kingdom	5 November 2007	Special	So Sweet	
Germany	1 September 2009	Witching Hour (Remixed & Rare) (digital only)	Redbird; Cobraside	
United Kingdom	1 September 2009	Witching Hour (Remixed & Rare) (digital only)	Redbird; Cobraside	
United States	1 September 2009	Witching Hour (Remixed & Rare) (digital only)	Redbird; Cobraside	
United States	18 January 2011	Reissue	Nettwerk	
United Kingdom	24 January 2011	Reissue	Nettwerk	
