= Light & Magic =

2002 album by Ladytron

Studio album by Ladytron
- Released: 17 September 2002
- Recorded: 2001–2002; Liverpool and Los Angeles
- Genres: Electropop; new wave
- Length: 62:45
- Languages: English; Bulgarian
- Label: Telstar
- Producers: Daniel Hunt; Mickey Petralia

Ladytron chronology
604 (2001)	Light & Magic (2002)	Softcore Jukebox (2003)

Alternative cover
- US and reissue cover

Singles from Light & Magic
- 1. "Seventeen" Released: 2002; 2. "Blue Jeans" Released: 10 March 2003; 3. "Evil" Released: 30 June 2003

Professional ratings
Aggregate scores
Source	Rating
Metacritic	76/100
Review scores
Source	Rating
AllMusic	4/5 stars
Chart Attack	4/5 stars
Robert Christgau	(choice cut)
Drowned in Sound	9/10
Pitchfork	7.1/10
Playlouder	3/5 stars
PopMatters	Favourable
Rolling Stone	Favourable
Stylus Magazine	B+

Light & Magic is the second studio album by English electronic music band Ladytron. It was released in the United States on 17 September 2002 by Emperor Norton and in the United Kingdom on 2 December 2002 by Telstar Records. The album has been reissued multiple times, most recently by Nettwerk in January 2011.

An earlier version of the song "NuHorizons" appeared as a B-side to the band's 2001 single "The Way That I Found You", under the title "Holiday 601". "Seventeen" is part of the soundtrack to the 2003 film Party Monster, while its instrumental was used in television advertisements for Christina Aguilera's 2008 fragrance Inspire.

Drowned in Sound ranked Light & Magic at number 14 on its Top 41 Albums of the Year list. Rolling Stone included the album on its 50 Best Albums of 2002 list. British dance music magazine Muzik named it the best electropop album of 2002. NME included it at number 41 on their Albums and Tracks of the Year for 2002 list.

== Track listing ==
No.	Title	Writer(s)	Length
1.	"True Mathematics"	Mira Aroyo; Daniel Hunt	2:23
2.	"Seventeen"	Hunt	4:37
3.	"Flicking Your Switch"	Aroyo; Hunt	3:26
4.	"Fire"	Hunt	2:49
5.	"Turn It On"	Hunt; Reuben Wu	4:46
6.	"Blue Jeans"	Hunt	4:13
7.	"Cracked LCD"	Aroyo; Hunt	2:32
8.	"Black Plastic"	Hunt	4:17
9.	"Evil"	Hunt	5:34
10.	"Startup Chime"	Hunt	3:30
11.	"NuHorizons"	Aroyo; Hunt	4:03
12.	"Cease2xist"	Hunt	4:37
13.	"Re:agents"	Aroyo; Hunt	4:53
14.	"Light & Magic"	Hunt	3:35
15.	"The Reason Why" (silence from 4:13 until 5:17, followed by hidden track "USA vs White Noise"; available only on initial non-US pressings)	Hunt	7:30

Japanese edition bonus tracks
No.	Title	Writer(s)	Length
16.	"USA vs White Noise"	Hunt	2:14
17.	"Seventeen" (Soulwax Mix)		4:25
18.	"Blue Jeans" (Josh Wink's Vocal Interpretation)		6:05

2004 Emperor Norton reissue bonus tracks
No.	Title	Length
16.	"Seventeen" (Soulwax Mix)	4:26
17.	"Cracked LCD" (Live in Sofia)	2:55
18.	"Light & Magic" (Live in Sofia)	3:23
19.	"Evil" (Pop Levi Mix)	3:13

2011 Nettwerk reissue bonus tracks
No.	Title	Length
16.	"Seventeen" (Soulwax Mix)	4:26
17.	"Cracked LCD" (Live in Sofia)	2:55
18.	"Light & Magic" (Live in Sofia)	3:23
19.	"Blue Jeans" (Josh Wink Mix)	6:04

== Light & Magic (Remixed & Rare) ==
On 1 September 2009, Redbird Records and Cobraside Distribution released a compilation of remixes, B-sides and rarities titled Light & Magic (Remixed & Rare). The cover is the negative of the US cover for Light & Magic. Nettwerk reissued Light & Magic (Remixed & Rare) on 20 December 2011 with a slightly altered track listing, removing "Cease2xist" (Instrumental 2002) and adding "Flicking Your Switch" (Erol Alkan Remix).

No.	Title	Length
1.	"Seventeen" (Soulwax Remix)	4:28
2.	"Blue Jeans 2.0" (UK Single Version)	3:51
3.	"Evil" (Axl of Evil Mix)	4:08
4.	"Blue Jeans" (Josh Wink Remix)	6:05
5.	"The Reason Why" (Alternate Version)	4:24
6.	"Light & Magic" (Alternate Version)	3:42
7.	"Cracked LCD" (Alternate Version)	2:49
8.	"Seventeen" (Justin Robertson Remix)	7:06
9.	"Blue Jeans" (Interpol Remix)	3:57
10.	"Evil" (Ewan Pearson Single Remix)	4:15
11.	"Seventeen" (Droyds 12 Remix)	6:32
12.	"Flicking Your Switch" (Mount Sims Remix 1)	5:24
13.	"Seventeen" (Darren Emerson Radio Edit)	3:33
14.	"Evil" (Tony Senghorne Remix)	8:09
15.	"Cease2xist" (Instrumental 2002)	4:48
16.	"Startup Chime" (Instrumental)	3:42
17.	"Evil" (M-Factor Remix)	7:55
18.	"Seventeen" (Acapella)	4:45

== Personnel ==
Credits adapted from the liner notes of Light & Magic.

Ladytron

- Daniel Hunt
- Reuben Wu
- Helen Marnie
- Mira Aroyo

Additional musicians

- Michael Fitzpatrick – additional programming
- Roger Joseph Manning Jr. – additional keyboards
- Shari – backing vocals on "Seventeen"
- Justin Meldal-Johnsen – electric bass

Technical

- Daniel Hunt – production
- Mickey Petralia – additional production, mixing
- Michael Fitzpatrick – engineering
- Matt Fausak – engineering assistance
- Aleks Tamulis – engineering assistance

Artwork

- Big Active – art direction, design
- Ladytron – art direction
- Donald Milne – photography
- Tom Dolan – art direction, design (US edition)
- William Howard – photography (US edition)

== Charts ==
Chart (2002)	Peak position
UK Independent Albums (Official Charts)	31
US Heatseekers Albums (Billboard)	31
US Independent Albums (Billboard)	24
US Top Dance Albums (Billboard)	7

== Release history ==
Region	Date	Format	Edition	Label	Ref.
United States	17 September 2002	CD; LP	Standard	Emperor Norton	
United Kingdom	2 December 2002	CD; LP	Standard	Telstar	
Germany	7 April 2003	CD	Standard	Warner	
Germany	12 May 2003	LP	Standard	Warner	
Japan	21 June 2003	CD	Standard	Victor Entertainment	
United States	20 July 2004	CD	Reissue	Emperor Norton	
Germany	1 September 2009	Digital download	Light & Magic (Remixed & Rare)	Redbird; Cobraside	
United Kingdom	1 September 2009	Digital download	Light & Magic (Remixed & Rare)	Redbird; Cobraside	
United States	1 September 2009	Digital download	Light & Magic (Remixed & Rare)	Redbird; Cobraside	
United Kingdom	11 January 2011	Digital download	Reissue	Nettwerk	
Germany	14 January 2011	CD	Reissue	Nettwerk	
United States	18 January 2011	CD; digital download	Reissue	Nettwerk	
United Kingdom	24 January 2011	CD	Reissue	Nettwerk	
