= Sleep It Off =

Studio album by Cristina
- Released: 1984
- Genre: No wave; synthpop
- Label: ZE; Mercury
- Producer: Don Was

Cristina chronology
| Cristina (1980) | Sleep It Off (1984) |

Singles from Sleep It Off
- 1. "Things Fall Apart/What's a Girl To Do"; 2. "Ticket to the Tropics/What's a Girl to Do"

Sleep It Off is the second album from no wave pop singer Cristina.

== Music ==
Sleep It Off was produced by Don Was. The songs were written by Cristina (all lyrics, except for the covers) collaborating with Was and her backing musicians, Barry Reynolds and Ben Brierley (from Marianne Faithfull's band), and Doug Fieger (from The Knack). The music is beat-laden, sophisticated synth-pop, setting Was's detailed production against Cristina's expressive but sometimes less-than-perfect, cynical No Wave vocal style. At times the music is reminiscent of Blondie, or Madonna, and it does not forget the decadent disco of Cristina's eponymous debut. [(opinion)] Chris Connelly describes a record that is a "grimly hilarious gavotte through the upscale decadence of the titled apocalypso" with an effect "somewhere between Marianne Faithfull and the Flying Lizards [but with] music more enjoyable than either". The three cover songs on the record span a wide range: the R&B of Van Morrison's "Blue Money", Brecht and Weill's "Ballad of Immoral Earnings" from the Threepenny Opera, and John Conlee's country hit "She Can't Say that Anymore". (The bonus tracks on the CD release also include covers of Prince and Was (Not Was).)

== Sleeve ==
The sleeve design is by Jean-Paul Goude, who later used a similar idea for Grace Jones's Slave to the Rhythm.

== Themes and reception ==
Although featuring shorter, more hook-laden songs than her previous album, Cristina, Sleep It Off is a dark album. Cristina describes it as an album about "coping with sex and money and power plays in the 1980's",

In the sixties people survived on political idealism. In the seventies there was this obsession with 'lifestyle' – women's lib or a new religion, sex and drugs and rock 'n' roll, or a macrobiotic diet. Something was always THE ANSWER. In the eighties people are into power and money and narcissism because they don't know what else to believe in. I don't think the album has a cynical take on this. I guess I just believe that whatever's going on, trying to exist is a pretty trying business. Life knocks you down, all you can do is get back up, brush yourself off, cry a little, laugh a little and keep going.

The album has been consistently lauded by critics. On its release in 1984, Rolling Stone said that

Sleep It Off is not for the MTV crowd, but so what? 'My life is in a turmoil/My thighs are black and blue/My sheets are stained, so is my brain/What's a girl to do?' Buy this record, I'd advise. Class is in session.

The Face placed Sleep It Off in its Top 20 records of 1984. When the album was re-issued on CD in 2004, Pitchfork awarded it a grade of 8.5, remarking that Cristina's music gives

a glimpse of how complex and fun popular culture could've been if Harvard girl Cristina's intelligent kitsch had lodged itself in the popular conscious instead of the new-age pabulum of a desperately seeking diva with a goddess complex.

Pitchfork also particularly praises the bonus tracks on the re-release.

Ladytron included "What's a Girl To Do" on their Softcore Jukebox.

Unfortunately, the record was a commercial flop and Cristina consequently retired.

== Track listing ==
=== Original Release (1984) ===
The original album release of Sleep It Off featured ten tracks.

Side A

1. "Don't Mutilate My Mink" (Cristina Monet-Palaci, Don Was)
2. "Ticket to the Tropics" (Monet-Palaci, Doug Fieger)
3. "She Can't Say That Anymore" (Sonny Throckmorton)
4. "Quicksand Lovers" (Monet-Palaci, Don Was, Bruce Nazarian)
5. "Rage and Fascination" (Monet-Palaci, Ben Brierley, Joe Mavety)

Side B

1. "Ballad of Immoral Earnings" ("Zuhälter Ballade", also translated as "Tango Ballad" or "Pimp's Ballad"; Bertolt Brecht, Kurt Weill)
2. "What's a Girl To Do" (Monet-Palaci, Don Was, Barry Reynolds)
3. "The Lie of Love" (Monet-Palaci, Reynolds)
4. "Blue Money" (Van Morrison)
5. "He Dines Out on Death" (Monet-Palaci, Brierley)
- All lyrics by Cristina except A3 and B1.
- Produced by Don Was.

=== CD Release (2004) ===
The CD release of Sleep It Off reordered the original ten tracks and added six bonus tracks.

1. "What's a Girl to Do"
2. "Ticket to the Tropics"
3. "The Lie of Love"
4. "Quicksand Lovers"
5. "Rage & Fascination"
6. "Ballad of Immoral Earnings"
7. "She Can't Say that Anymore"
8. "Blue Money"
9. "Don't Mutilate My Mink"
10. "He Dines Out on Death"
11. "Smile" (Don Was, David Was) (bonus track)
12. "Deb Behind Bars" (Monet-Palaci, Brierley) (bonus)
13. "Things Fall Apart" (Monet-Palaci, Don Was, David Was) (bonus)
14. "When U Were Mine" (Prince) (bonus)
15. "Deb Behind Bars [alternate version]" (Monet-Palaci, Brierley) (bonus)
16. "You Rented a Space" (Monet-Palaci, Robert Palmer) (bonus)
- "'Things Fall Apart' is dedicated to the late Lizzy Mercier Descloux, ma chère copine in adversity ... In loving memory of her talent, her courage, and her kindness. Cristina" (Dedication in 2004 CD notes; Descloux had died that year.)
- Tracks 11–12 and 15 are from the Sleep It Off album sessions.
- Track 13 was originally released 1981 with Material's (with Nona Hendryx) song "It's a Holiday" on a split 12" taken from the ZE album A Christmas Record.
- Tracks 14, 16: are from demo sessions with Robert Palmer at the Compass Point Studios.
- Production by Don Was, except tracks 14 and 16: produced by Robert Palmer.

=== Rubellan Remasters CD Release (2023) ===
The 2023 Rubellan Remasters release of Sleep It Off featured the original ten tracks in their original running order plus two bonus tracks.

1. "Don't Mutilate My Mink"
2. "Ticket to the Tropics"
3. "She Can't Say That Anymore"
4. "Quicksand Lovers"
5. "Rage and Fascination"
6. "Ballad of Immoral Earnings"
7. "What's a Girl to Do"
8. "The Lie of Love"
9. "Blue Money"
10. "He Dines Out on Death"
11. "Things Fall Apart" (bonus)
12. "Disco Clone" (7" Mix) (bonus)
- The version of "Things Fall Apart" on this reissue is taken from the 1982 version of A Christmas Record.
- The version of "Disco Clone" on this reissue is a 1981 7" remix as opposed to the original 1978 single.
- Production by Don Was; Reissue production by Scott Davies.

== Personnel ==
- Cristina – vocals
- Barry Reynolds – guitar
- Ben Brierley – guitar, harmony vocals
- Bruce Nazarian – guitar, slide guitar
- Don Was – Oberheim Obsx, Casio organ, guitar, bass guitar, drum machine, percussion
- Howard Wyeth – drums
- Kevin Tschirhart – percussion
- David McMurray – saxophone
- Kathy Kosins, Susan Schmidt – harmony vocals

with:

- "Sugar-coated" Andy Hernandez – marimba on "Ticket to the Tropics"
- Marcus Belgrave – trumpet on "Ticket to the Tropics"
- Christopher Ewen – synthesizer on "Rage and Fascination"
- Doug Fieger – lead guitar, bass on "Blue Money"
- David Was, James Chance – saxophone on "Blue Money"

Technical

- Michael Zilkha – executive producer
- Don Was, Pete Thea – engineer
- Don Was, Michael Frondelli – mixing
- Jean-Paul Goude – cover, design concept
