= Zukanican =

English rock band

- Origin: Liverpool, England
- Genres: Experimental rock, experimental music
- Years active: 2003–present
- Labels: Pickled Egg Records, Medical Records
- Formerly of: The Living Brain
- Members: Phil Lucking; James Pagella; Harry Sumnall; Tom Sumnall
- Past members: Ray Dickaty; Joe Biltone; Dominic Lewington; Pop Levi (Jonathan Levi)
- Website: http://www.myspace.com/zukanican

Zukanican are an English experimental rock band primarily based in Liverpool.

== History ==
The band was formed in 2003 by members of Ged Lynn's post-Stairs band The Living Brain, which along with singer Lars Gabel also featured James Pagella and Tom Sumnall.

Based at Liverpool rehearsal space The Kif, the band's lineup has changed considerably over the years from a twin drum-twin brass, bass and percussion ensemble, to the current line up featuring bass, drums, brass, and electronics/synths. The band also at one time featured Super Numeri founder and Ladytron bassist Pop Levi, and his future rhythm guitarist Dominic Lewington.

Zukanican are noted for their improvised live performances and have been compared to, amongst other acts, Sun Ra, Soft Machine and Can, and have also acted as Damo Suzuki's sound carriers on several occasions.

The band have released five albums and one EP.

== Discography ==
=== Albums ===
- None Jazz CD (2003, Medical Records)
- Jarr CD (2004, Medical Records)
- Astral Zuk Fodder CD (2005, Medical Records)
- Horse Republic CD (2006, Pickled Egg Records)
- The Stumbling Block CD (2009, Pickled Egg Records)

=== EPs ===
- E 5Number 10" (2004, Pickled Egg Records)
