= Antennas Up =

American indie pop rock band

- Origin: Kansas City, Missouri, United States
- Genres: Electropop; Indie; Rock music
- Years active: 2008–present
- Labels: Independent
- Members: Kyle Akers; Bo McCall; Jon Ulasien; Ryan "The Ryantist" Whitehouse
- Past members: Bobby Topaz; Lonnie Coleman
- Website: http://www.antennasupmusic.com/

Antennas Up is an indie pop rock band from Kansas City, Missouri.

"Whether they’re creating funky, groovy beats, infectious driving pop or atmospheric noises, Antennas Up takes a fresh approach to every song."

Since forming in 2008, the four-some has performed alongside national acts such as Jack's Mannequin, Girl Talk, Matt & Kim, Andy Grammer, Electric Six, Andrew McMahon, Company of Thieves (band), Ha Ha Tonka, Heypenny, Tommy & The High Pilots, Churchill (band), Via Audio, Cloud Cult, and Cash Cash. In 2010, Antennas Up was selected to perform in an official showcase at SXSW in Austin, Texas. Later that year, The Boston Phoenix chose Antennas Up as the "Best New Band in Missouri." In 2013, Antennas Up was selected to be an official performer at North by Northeast. They have performed on KSHB's morning television show Kansas City Live and KRBZ#The Night the Buzz Stole Christmas. The band is featured in the independent documentary Corporate FM.

== Antennas Up ==
Antennas Up's independent, self-titled album, was released in 2009, and reviewed as:

A combination of "Yaz-era power pop, hook-filled synth, and skittery guitar with urgent vocals... [It] sounds like the result of cross-pollinating the lyrical prowess and hottt moves of Flight of the Conchords with the pop-electronica of CSS. It's fun, unselfconscious, and hedonistic."

"Good lyrics combined with birth-of-rock-and-roll rhythms reel you in, and before you know it you're in deep....Altogether 'Antennas Up' is a very solid album, blending numerous ideas and influences. Definitely worth checking out, no matter your musical orientation."

Three songs from the album ("Don't Wait Up," "On the Line" and "PSA") are featured on the game Tap Tap Revenge 3.

In 2011, "Don't Wait Up" was featured in the independent film Falling Overnight, and in 2012, the song "Break Me Down" was featured on A&E's television show The Glades.

== The Awkward Phase ==
Antennas Up released their sophomore album The Awkward Phase on May 15, 2012. It debuted on the CMJ Top 200 Chart, where it charted for more than 10 weeks, peaking at number 88. "December," the band's pre-released single from "The Awkward Phase," was featured in a video for The Buckle (clothing retailer)'s fall 2011 women's clothing line. The album's songs "Pretenders" and "Coming On" have been featured in numerous television shows, including The CW's hit show Gossip Girl and MTV's scripted comedic dramas Underemployed (TV series) and Awkward (TV series).

Review of The Awkward Phase:

"The result was a collection of 10 bubbly and melodic pop/rock/soul dance songs that recall everyone from Phoenix (band) and a few ’80s synth-pop bands (Spandau Ballet) to Hall and Oates. Live, the translation is a bit rawer but just as groovy and invigorating."

== Members ==
- Kyle Akers – lead vocals, bass
- Bo McCall – guitar, vocals
- Jon Ulasien – guitar, keys, vocals/vocoder
- Ryan "The Ryantist" Whitehouse – drums, vocals

== Discography ==
2009: Self-titled (Plastic Artifice)

- Mixed by Allen Farmelo (Downtown Harvest, Department of Good and Evil, Time Farmer, Paul Britten)
- Mastered by Bob Power (Tribe Called Quest, The Roots, Common, Erykah Badu, Citizen Cope, De La Soul)

2012: The Awkward Phase (Plastic Artifice)

- Produced by Ryan "The Ryantist" Whitehouse (co-producer and engineer – Ha Ha Tonka Death Of A Decade, Antennas Up Self-titled)
- Mixed by Mike Cresswell (mixing engineer – Lyrics Borne, Blackalicious, General Elektriks, Honeycut)
- Mastered by Bob Power (engineer and producer – Common, Tribe Called Quest, The Roots, Citizen Cope)
