= Blue Money =

Single by Van Morrison

from the album His Band and the Street Choir
- A-side: "Blue Money"
- B-side: "Sweet Thing" (US); "Call Me Up in Dreamland" (Europe)
- Released: 1971
- Recorded: 1970
- Genre: R&B
- Length: 3:40
- Label: Warner Bros.
- Songwriter(s): Van Morrison
- Producer(s): Van Morrison

Van Morrison singles chronology
"Domino" (1970)	"Blue Money" (1971)	"Call Me Up in Dreamland" (1971)

"Blue Money" is a song written by Northern Irish singer-songwriter Van Morrison. It was the second of two Top Forty hits from his 1970 album, His Band and the Street Choir (the other being "Domino"), reaching No. 23 on the US chart. The US single featured "Sweet Thing", from the album Astral Weeks, as the B-side. It was released as a single in the UK in June 1971 with a different B-side, "Call Me Up in Dreamland". The song became Morrison's third best selling single of the 1970s, remaining on the charts for three months.

The lyrics have the singer promising his girl that they will paint the town together with her "blue money". Critic Maury Dean states that the theme picks up from Lefty Frizzell's 1950 No. 1 song "If You've Got the Money I've Got the Time". In a 1972 Rolling Stone interview with John Grissim Jr., Morrison commented about the popularity of "Blue Money" in cities like Boston and New York City: "Out here I get asked to play 'Blue Money' all the time. All the kids love it, the kids in the street. It's their favorite number."

== Critical response ==
Robert Christgau, writing in the Village Voice in 1971, described "Blue Money" and "Domino" as "superb examples of Morrison's loose, allusive white r&b." Record World called it a "nifty cut" and praised Morrison's "scat singing." Cash Box said "Van Morrison heads further into the blues base that marked his early hit material, but which now serves as a change of recent pace." Billboard called it "a solid rocker that should keep [Morrison] active on the charts."

Writer M. Mark described it as "a pun-filled song about time and cash." Biographer Brian Hinton compared the song's sound to Georgie Fame and the Blue Flames: "boozy horns and a nonsensical chorus." Dean praises the song's "snarly, snappity sounds" and Morrison's "jazzy baritone."

== Covers ==
Cristina covered "Blue Money" on her 1984 album, Sleep It Off and The Flying Pickets included an a cappella version as the title track on their 1990 album, Blue Money. The song was also featured throughout the 1985 British television film Blue Money, starring Tim Curry

== Personnel ==
- Van Morrison – guitar, vocal
- Alan Hand – piano
- Keith Johnson – trumpet
- John Klingberg – bass
- John Platania – guitar
- Jack Schroer – baritone saxophone
- Dahaud Shaar (David Shaw) – drums

The Street Choir:

- Larry Goldsmith
- Janet Planet
- Andrew Robinson
- Ellen Schroer
- Dahaud Shaar
- Martha Velez

== Charts ==
Chart (1971)	Peak Position
U.S. Pop Singles	23
