= Seventeen (Ladytron song) =

Single by Ladytron

from the album Light & Magic
- Released: 2002
- Recorded: 2002
- Genre: Electroclash
- Length: 3:31
- Label: Telstar
- Songwriter: Ladytron
- Producer: Ladytron

Ladytron singles chronology
"The Way That Want and I Found You" (2007)	"Seventeen" (2002)	"Blue Jeans" (2003)

Music video
- "Seventeen" on YouTube

"Seventeen" is a song by English electronic music group Ladytron. It was released as the first single from their second album Light & Magic (2002).

== Content ==
The song is known for its minimalistic lyrics, that consist only of: "They only want you when you're seventeen / When you're twenty-one, you're no fun / They take a Polaroid and let you go / Say they'll let you know, so come on".

A new version "Seventeen 05", made by the band, featured on "Destroy Everything You Touch" single.

== Music video ==
The music video of "Seventeen" featured the band playing the song in a special black room, that includes some neon lights. The black room is separated by a wide window from another larger grey room. In the grey room is a weighing scale, a telephone and a stand with an old television and another device that looks like a VCR. Mira Aroyo and Helen Marnie are in front of the black room near that window, and Daniel Hunt and Reuben Wu are in the back. Each member wears a black uniform and plays a synthesizer.

The video starts with a group of schoolgirls and a professor entering the grey room from a long lobby. The girls start dancing while the band performs the song and also looks at them through that wide window. From time to time the professor removes one of the girls. At the end of the song, there's only one girl left in the grey room. Then she starts staring at the band through the window.

== Legacy ==
"Seventeen" was used in the 2003 movie Party Monster. It was used on the mix albums Fabric 09 by Slam, A Bugged Out Mix by Felix da Housecat and on Most of the Remixes by Soulwax. In 2015, the song was used in the BBC Three documentary Secrets of China.

== Track listing ==
CD

1. "Seventeen (Original Mix)" – 4:41
2. "Seventeen (The Droyds Mix)" – 6:27
3. "Seventeen (Soulwax Mix)" – 4:47
4. "Seventeen (Radio Edit)" – 3:31

12" vinyl

1. "Seventeen (Original Mix)"
2. "Seventeen (Manntraxx Mix)"
3. "Seventeen (The Droyds Mix)"
4. "Seventeen (Soulwax Mix)"

== Charts ==
Chart performance for "Seventeen"
Chart (2002–2003)	Peak position
Australia (ARIA)	45
UK Singles (Official Charts)	68
