= Never Never Love =

Never Never Love may refer to:

- Never Never Love (album), an album by Pop Levi
- "Never Never Love" (song), a 1996 song by Simply Red
