= Miss Black and Her Friends =

1999 EP by Ladytron

EP by Ladytron
- Released: December 1999
- Genre: Electropop, synthpop, new wave
- Length: 26:23
- Label: Bambini
- Producer: Ladytron, Lance Thomas

Ladytron chronology
Miss Black and Her Friends (1999)	Commodore Rock (2000)

Miss Black and Her Friends is the debut EP by English electronic band Ladytron. It was released in December 1999 exclusively in Japan through Bambini label. All tracks but "Miss Black" would be later released on their 2001 debut album, 604.

== Track listing ==
1. "Miss Black" – 1:53
2. "Paco" – 3:00
3. "Playgirl" – 3:52
4. "CSKA Sofia" – 2:34
5. "Another Breakfast with You" – 3:04
6. "He Took Her to a Movie" – 3:06
7. "Commodore Rock" – 4:47
8. "Skools Out" – 4:08
