= 604 (album) =

2001 album by Ladytron

Studio album by Ladytron
- Released: 6 February 2001
- Recorded: 1997–2000 (Liverpool, England)
- Genres: Synth-pop; industrial dance
- Length: 53:35
- Languages: English; Bulgarian
- Label: Invicta Hi-Fi
- Producers: Ladytron; Lance Thomas

Ladytron chronology
Mu-Tron EP (2000)	604 (2001)	Light & Magic (2002)

Alternative cover
- US and reissue cover

Singles from 604
- 1. "He Took Her to a Movie" Released: 7 June 1999; 2. "Playgirl" Released: 26 June 2000; 3. "The Way That I Found You" Released: 29 January 2001; 4. "Playgirl (UK re-release)" Released: 10 December 2001

604 is the debut studio album by English electronic music band Ladytron, released in the United States on 6 February 2001 by Emperor Norton Records and in the United Kingdom on 12 March 2001 by Invicta Hi-Fi. It was co-produced, engineered and mixed by Lance Thomas. Some of the tracks had been previously released on their EPs Miss Black and Her Friends (1999), Mu-Tron EP (2000) and Commodore Rock (2000).

On 20 July 2004, 604 was reissued in the US with four bonus tracks, the first three being live recordings made on 16 May 2003 at the Central Military Club in Sofia, Bulgaria. The January 2011 re-release of the album on Nettwerk also features these same bonus tracks.

In a 2002 interview with online magazine Chaos Control, Daniel Hunt stated that the album was named after the area code for the Vancouver area in British Columbia. Reuben Wu drew the cover of the European edition of 604.

== Critical reception ==
Professional ratings
Aggregate scores
Source	Rating
Metacritic	81/100
Review scores
Source	Rating
AllMusic	4/5 stars
Chart Attack	4/5
Drawer B	Favourable
entertainment.ie	4/5 stars
Exclaim!	Favourable
Muzik	5/5 stars
NME	8/10
Pitchfork	7.5/10
PopMatters	Favourable
Rolling Stone	Favourable

604 received general acclaim from music critics. At Metacritic, which assigns a normalised rating out of 100 to reviews from mainstream publications, the album received an average score of 81, based on 11 reviews, which indicates "universal acclaim".

In March 2001, 604 was selected as Album of the Month by Muzik magazine.

As of July 2002, the album had sold 20,000 copies in the United States, according to Nielsen SoundScan.

== Singles ==
"He Took Her to a Movie" was released as the album's lead single. The song was recorded for £50, and features guest vocals from Lisa Eriksson of San Francisco-based electronic duo Techno Squirrels. Upon its release, it was named the "Single of the Week" by NME magazine. The track was inspired by Kraftwerk's 1978 song "The Model".

"He Took Her to a Movie" UK 12" single
No.	Title	Length
1.	"He Took Her to a Movie"
2.	"He Took Her to a Movie" (Instrumental)
3.	"Movie..." (Surreal Madrid Mix)

"Playgirl" was released as the album's second single. It peaked at number 89 on the UK Singles Chart.

"Playgirl" UK CD 1 (2001)
No.	Title	Length
1.	"Playgirl" (Original 604 Version)	3:49
2.	"Playgirl" (King of Woolworths Coming Down)	7:48
3.	"Playgirl" (I Monster Northern Lites Mix)	6:05

"Playgirl" UK CD 2 (2001)
No.	Title	Length
1.	"Playgirl" (Felix Thee Grooveretro Radio Mix)	3:51
2.	"Playgirl" (Zombie Nation Mix)	5:46
3.	"Playgirl" (Simian Playboy Mix)	2:38

"The Way That I Found You" was released as the album's third and final single. It reached number 88 on the UK Singles Chart. The single's B-side, "Holiday 601", was included on Ladytron's second studio album, Light & Magic, retitled "NuHorizons".

"The Way That I Found You" UK CD single
No.	Title	Length
1.	"The Way That I Found You"	3:29
2.	"Holiday 601"	3:57
3.	"Miss Black"	1:52

"The Way That I Found You" UK 7" single
No.	Title	Length
1.	"The Way That I Found You"	3:29
2.	"Holiday 601"	3:57

== Track listing ==
All tracks are written by Ladytron, except where noted.

No.	Title	Length
1.	"Mu-Tron"	2:58
2.	"Discotraxx"	3:50
3.	"Another Breakfast with You"	3:03
4.	"CSKA Sofia"	2:21
5.	"The Way That I Found You"	3:29
6.	"Paco!"	3:00
7.	"Commodore Rock"	4:47
8.	"Zmeyka"	3:14
9.	"Playgirl"	3:49
10.	"I'm with the Pilots"	2:43
11.	"This Is Our Sound"	4:09
12.	"He Took Her to a Movie"	3:10
13.	"Laughing Cavalier"	1:08
14.	"Ladybird" (music by Ladytron; words by Ladytron and K Grime)	4:38
15.	"Jet Age"	3:10
16.	"Skools Out..."	4:06

Reissue bonus tracks
No.	Title	Length
17.	"USA vs. White Noise" (live in Sofia)	4:05
18.	"He Took Her to a Movie" (live in Sofia)	5:15
19.	"Commodore Rock" (live in Sofia)	4:31
20.	"Playgirl" (Snap Ant Remix)	6:13

== 604 (Remixed & Rare) ==
On 1 September 2009, Redbird Records and Cobraside Distribution released a compilation of remixes, B-sides and rarities titled 604 (Remixed & Rare). The cover is the negative of the US cover for 604.

No.	Title	Length
1.	"Playgirl" (Felix da Housecat Glitz Club Remix)	6:37
2.	"He Took Her to a Movie" (Bertrand Burgalat Remix)	3:46
3.	"Playgirl" (Tobias Neumann Mix)	3:56
4.	"USA vs. White Noise"	2:18
5.	"Playgirl" (Simian Playboy Mix)	2:38
6.	"Miss Black"	1:54
7.	"Playgirl" (Snap Ant Remix)	6:14
8.	"Holiday 601"	3:54
9.	"He Took Her to a Movie" (Surreal Madrid Remix)	4:55
10.	"Olivetti Jerk"	3:27
11.	"Playgirl" (I Monster Remix)	6:08
12.	"Playgirl" (Tobias Neumann Club Remix)	3:53
13.	"Playgirl" (Tommie Sunshine Remix)	5:43

== Personnel ==
Credits adapted from the liner notes of 604.

- Ladytron – production, design
- Lance Thomas – additional production, engineering
- Eddy Schreyer – mastering
- Lisa Eriksson – guest vocals on "He Took Her to a Movie"
- Tom Dolan – design
- Sebastian Meyer – cover photography (US edition)

== Release history ==
Region	Date	Edition	Label	Ref.
United States	6 February 2001	Standard	Emperor Norton	
United Kingdom	12 March 2001	Standard	Invicta Hi-Fi	
Germany	26 March 2001	Standard	Labels	
United States	20 July 2004	Reissue	Emperor Norton	
Germany	14 January 2011	Reissue	Nettwerk	
United States	18 January 2011	Reissue	Nettwerk	
United Kingdom	24 January 2011	Reissue	Nettwerk	

604 (Remixed & Rare)
Region	Date	Format	Label	Ref.
Germany	1 September 2009	Digital download	Redbird; Cobraside	
United Kingdom	1 September 2009	Digital download	Redbird; Cobraside	
United States	1 September 2009	Digital download	Redbird; Cobraside	
United States	13 December 2011	CD	Nettwerk	
Germany	20 December 2011	CD; digital download	Nettwerk	
United Kingdom	20 December 2011	CD	ADA	
United Kingdom	20 December 2011	Digital download	Nettwerk	
United States	20 December 2011	Digital download	Nettwerk	
