= Mu-Tron EP =

2000 EP by Ladytron

EP by Ladytron
- Released: October 2000
- Genre: Electronic, synthpop, new wave
- Label: Invicta Hi-Fi
- Producer: Ladytron, Lance Thomas

Ladytron chronology
Commodore Rock (2000)	Mu-Tron EP (2000)	604 (2001)

Mu-Tron EP is the third extended play (EP) by English electronic band Ladytron. It was released in the United Kingdom in October 2000 by Invicta Hi-Fi Records on CD and 12" formats. The title "Mu-Tron" is a reference to the manufacturer of electronic musical effects with the same name. The cover was designed by band member Reuben Wu.

"Another Breakfast With You" and "Paco!" were later included on Ladytron's debut album titled 604, while "USA vs. White Noise" and "Playgirl" (Snap Ant Version) appeared as bonus tracks to the same album. 604 also included an instrumental song titled "Mu-Tron".

== Track listing ==
CD

1. "Another Breakfast With You"
2. "Paco!"
3. "USA vs. White Noise"
4. "Playgirl" (Snap Ant Version)

12"
A1. "USA vs. White Noise"
A2. "Playgirl" (Snap Ant Version)
B1. "Paco!"
B2. "Another Breakfast With You"
