= Commodore Rock =

2000 EP by Ladytron

EP by Ladytron
- Released: June 2000
- Genre: Electropop; synthpop; new wave
- Length: 13:36
- Label: Invicta Hi-Fi; Tricatel; Emperor Norton
- Producer: Ladytron; Lance Thomas

Ladytron chronology
Miss Black and Her Friends (1999)	Commodore Rock (2000)	Mu-Tron EP (2000)

Commodore Rock is the second EP by English electronic band Ladytron. It was released in June 2000 by Invicta Hi-Fi Records (UK) and Emperor Norton (US) on CD and 12" formats. A 10" vinyl special edition was released by French label Tricatel in the same year. This edition included Ladytron's debut single "He Took Her To a Movie" remixed by Tricatel's owner Bertrand Burgalat and the instrumental "Olivetti Jerk".

"Playgirl" was sung by Helen Marnie. "Commodore Rock" and "Paco!" were sung by Mira Aroyo. "Miss Black" and "Olivetti Jerk" are instrumentals. "Playgirl", "Commodore Rock" and "Paco!" were later included on the Ladytron's debut album 604.

Daniel Hunt is credited for EP's design, Reuben Wu for EP's illustration and Mira Aroyo for photography.

== Reception ==
Professional ratings
Review scores
Source	Rating
Allmusic	4/5 stars
Exclaim.ca	(very positive)
Pitchfork	6.5/10

Commodore Rock received a 4/5 rating from Allmusic. According to Allmusic, Ladytron "recall Devo with their quirky structure and heavy Moog usage".

Exclaim.ca gave a very positive review of this EP: "dance but not too, lounge but not overly, these retro-futurists play their brand of new wave international jet set electronic pop so perfectly cool that it's almost scary. Employing vintage synthesisers, old school beat boxes and crisp, sophisticated female vocals, this British-based quartet recall bands like Stereolab, yet retain their own distinct vibe".

According to Pitchfork, "still, though uneven, Commodore Rock remains a worthwhile listen and should be counted as a promising debut".

== Track listing ==
=== CD & 12" ===
1. "Playgirl" – 3:55
2. "Commodore Rock" – 4:48
3. "Miss Black" – 1:54
4. "Paco!" – 2:59

=== 10" (Tricatel edition) ===
1. "Playgirl" – 3:52
2. "Commodore Rock" – 4:47
3. "He Took Her To a Movie" (Bertrand Mix) – 3:48
4. "Olivetti Jerk" – 3:25

== Credits ==
- Design: Danny
- Illustration: Reuben
- Photography: Mira
- Producer: Ladytron, Lance Thomas
- Written: Ladytron
