= His Band and the Street Choir =

- CD and UK album cover: The original US album cover is title-less.

Studio album by Van Morrison
- Released: November 1970
- Recorded: March–July 1970
- Studio: A&R (New York City, US)
- Genre: Rhythm and blues, folk-rock
- Length: 41:40
- Label: Warner Bros.
- Producer: Van Morrison

Van Morrison chronology
Moondance (1970)	His Band and the Street Choir (1970)	Tupelo Honey (1971)

Singles from His Band and the Street Choir
- 1. "Domino" Released: 14 October 1970; 2. "Blue Money" Released: 13 January 1971; 3. "Call Me Up in Dreamland" Released: 28 April 1971

His Band and the Street Choir (also referred to as Street Choir) is the fourth studio album by Northern Irish singer-songwriter Van Morrison. It was released in November 1970 by Warner Bros. Records. Originally titled Virgo's Fool, Street Choir was renamed by Warner Bros. without Morrison's consent. Recording began in early 1970 with a demo session in a small church in Woodstock, New York. Morrison booked the A&R Studios on 46th Street in New York City in the second quarter of 1970 to produce two sessions of songs that were released on His Band and the Street Choir.

Reviewers praised the music of both sessions for its free, relaxed sound, but the lyrics were considered to be simple compared with those of his previous work. Morrison had intended to record the album a cappella with only vocal backing by a vocal group he called the Street Choir, but the songs released on the album that included the choir also featured a backing band. Morrison was dissatisfied with additional vocalists to the original quintet that made up the choir, and these changes and others have led him to regard Street Choir poorly in later years.

His Band and the Street Choir was as well received as Morrison's previous album, Moondance, peaking at number 32 on the Billboard 200 and number 18 on the UK Album Chart. It owes its success mainly to the US Top Ten single "Domino", which was released before the album and surpassed Morrison's 1967 hit, "Brown Eyed Girl". As of 2019, "Domino" remains the most successful single of Morrison's solo career. Two other singles were released from the album, "Blue Money" and "Call Me Up in Dreamland"; although less successful, they still managed to reach the Billboard Hot 100.

== Production ==
=== Recording ===
Recording began with a demo session at a small church in Woodstock, which was not intended to produce any official releases. During its course Morrison worked on leftover material from his previous two albums (Astral Weeks and Moondance), recorded songs that he had not performed in the studio before ("Crazy Face" and "Give Me a Kiss"), as well as two instrumentals. Limited recording equipment was used, operated by drummer Dahaud Shaar, who was intending to open a recording studio in Woodstock at the time. Shaar remembered: "I found an old church and we would just load in. I'd set up a pair of mikes and we would just run down some tracks with the tapes running. They became like a working thing for the album."

Van Morrison's band in 1970 (from left to right): Alan Hand, Larry Goldsmith, Keith Johnson, Dahaud Shaar, Van Morrison, John Klingberg, Jack Schroer.

For his new band Morrison brought back three musicians from the Moondance sessions: saxophonist Jack Schroer; guitarist John Platania and bassist John Klingberg. The backing vocal trio of Emily Houston, Judy Clay and Jackie Verdell also returned to sing on "If I Ever Needed Someone". Multi-instrumentalist Dahaud Shaar joined for His Band and the Street Choir; he was a veteran of the Moondance tour, though he had not played on the album. Keyboardist Alan Hand joined Morrison's band in late April 1970, replacing Jef Labes, who had left the band and moved to Israel before the end of the year. Keith Johnson completed the line-up on trumpet and Hammond organ.

Between March and May 1970 Morrison began work on the album at the A&R recording studios in New York City. He intended to create a full a capella record, and with this in mind assembled a vocal group he called the Street Choir, consisting of his friends Dahaud Shaar, Larry Goldsmith, Andrew Robinson and then wife, Janet "Planet" Rigsbee, who all lived near Woodstock. He had wanted the choir to feature only four vocalists, but was persuaded to allow two additional members to join: the wives of Keith Johnson and Jack Schroer (Martha Velez and Ellen Schroer). However, Morrison was later persuaded to abandon the use of a cappella: "I had a group of people in mind for the Street Choir ... I asked them if they wanted to sing ... then the old ladies got involved and it ruined the whole thing." He was unhappy with the tracks recorded with the choir, as he wanted to use the group for a different effect: "I wanted these certain guys to form an a cappella group so that I could cut a lot of songs with just maybe one guitar. But it didn't turn out." During this session Morrison recorded the same tracks used for the demo session in Woodstock, as well as "Gypsy Queen" and an additional instrumental, six of which were used on Street Choir. Elliot Scheiner was used as the engineer for this session, after he helped to produce Moondance. However, according to biographer Clinton Heylin, Scheiner and Morrison had a disagreement, so he was not used for the rest of the album.

Morrison returned to the A&R studios between June and August to record the remaining six tracks that featured on the album. For this second session Dahaud Shaar filled the role of engineer, though Shaar did not remember Morrison giving the job to him: "Elliot thought he was going to be the co-producer, but then again I never saw him calling takes or asking people to change parts ... I didn't consider myself co-producer. Van would ask me questions and I would give him answers, but it was never a defined role." Morrison felt dissatisfied with some of the final recordings, and notably reworked the song "Street Choir" shortly before studio work concluded.

=== Composition ===
Some songs featured on His Band and the Street Choir were first recorded for the albums Astral Weeks and Moondance. Morrison rewrote and rearranged them for release on Street Choir because the recordings for his new album featured different personnel and instrumentation. The songs on the album, which Rolling Stone reviewer Jon Landau believes have a free, relaxed sound to them, borrow from various music genres; the simple lyrics lack the complexity popularly expected from Morrison's work. According to Pitchfork journalist Stephen Thomas Erlewine, Street Choir eschewed Moondance's jazz influences in favor of "soul and gospel, using folk almost as an accent", all the while possessing a "heavy R&B kick". AllMusic contributor Jason Ankeny believed that, without the "overt mysticism" of the singer's previous two records, it was "simply Morrison's valentine to the rhythm and blues that inspired him".

The first recording that would feature on His Band and the Street Choir was "I've Been Working", an out-take from the Astral Weeks sessions in 1968 and the Moondance sessions in 1969. The final version produced on His Band and the Street Choir is upbeat and shows the influence of James Brown. Morrison notably sings the line "Woman, woman, woman, you make me feel alright" in unison with the horn section, which Jon Landau describes as "breathtaking".

"Domino" had been recorded many times before its release. The first was in sessions from September to November 1968, just after Astral Weeks was recorded. Morrison rearranged "Domino" frequently from 1968 to 1970, notably recording rap and harmony versions. For its release it was arranged in a moderate 4/4 tempo and features rhythm guitar. Horn overdubs were later added to the recording. Morrison ad libs between the end of the chorus and the start of the verses, when he shouts the words "Dig it!", as well as near the end with "And the band ... one more time!", which, according to biographer Peter Mills, helps bring out the theme of "liveliness" in both the song and the album as a whole. The song was considered by musicologist Brian Hinton as a tribute to pianist and singer-songwriter, Fats Domino. As with "Domino", Morrison first recorded "If I Ever Needed Someone" in late 1968; it is one of many blues-influenced tracks on the album.

"Virgo Clowns" was first recorded at the start of 1969 as "(Sit Down) Funny Face". Morrison next recorded it during the first Street Choir session, renaming it simply "Funny Face". It was re-recorded during the second session under the completely different title of "Virgo Clowns". In its final form, Morrison and John Platania duet on acoustic guitars. As the song fades out laughter is heard performed by Dahaud Shaar and Larry Goldsmith.

"Crazy Face" evolved from "Going Around with Jesse James", a song Morrison first recorded for Astral Weeks on 15 October 1968. Both songs contain references to American outlaw Jesse James. Morrison arranged "Crazy Face" in the irregular time signature 8/4; the first, third and seventh beats of the bar are emphasised. It begins with a gentle piano introduction, and ends abruptly, which, in Peter Mills' view, represents a shot from a gun, consistent with the American outlaw theme.

"Give Me a Kiss" and "Gypsy Queen" are the final songs recorded during the first recording session. Morrison wrote "Give me a Kiss" about either Planet or his newly born baby girl Shana. It is a twelve bar blues in the style of boogie rock, a music genre prominent in the 1960s, leading reviewers to compare the song to the work of The Beatles and Elvis Presley. Reviewers believed the song "Gypsy Queen" was inspired by "Gypsy Woman", first recorded by Curtis Mayfield and The Impressions. Johnny Rogan feels the song is "a failed attempt to recapture the spirit of 'Caravan'", another Morrison composition inspired by "Gypsy Woman", released on the album Moondance. Morrison sings the song in falsetto, while keyboardist Alan Hand plays celeste, imitating a music box at both the beginning and end.

The second recording session yielded the remaining material. "Call Me Up in Dreamland" is a gospel-style composition. The lyrics refer to life on the road, as Morrison was touring when he recorded the album. They also refer to Morrison and Janet Planet's life at the time: "We were finally, really living in a dreamland—believe it or not—it was a magical time", Planet recalled.

"I'll Be Your Lover, Too" was inspired by Morrison and Planet's marriage. This acoustic ballad has a moderate 4/4 tempo, with one 5/8 bar before the vocal comes in. "Blue Money", a pun-filled reference to Morrison's financial situation, is about a model, perhaps his wife. (Planet worked in the industry before meeting Morrison.) "Sweet Jannie" is the second twelve-bar blues on the album; written about young love, the song is another that reviewers speculated was about Planet. The lyrics, "I've been in love with you baby / Ever since you were in Sunday school" lead Clinton Heylin to believe it was written about memories from Morrison's childhood when he attended Sunday school in Belfast; Planet is a California-raised Texan.

In the album closer, "Street Choir", Morrison repeats the questions, "Why did you let me down / And now that things are better off / Why do you come around". Because of these lyrics Heylin wrote that "such songs [as "Street Choir"] were spawned by an increasing awareness of just how badly ripped off he had been". Ken Brooks has said that the lyric "Move On Up" is another reference on the album to a Curtis Mayfield song. The track prominently features Keith Johnson's trumpet and Morrison's harmonica. Writer Brian Hinton described the lyrics as perversely bitter, while Jon Landau wrote that "Street Choir" was one of the "two or three finest songs" of Morrison's career because of its "musical and poetic energy".

=== Packaging ===
Warner Bros. Records scheduled His Band and the Street Choir for rush-release to sell over Christmas 1970, leaving little time to plan the packaging. These pressured conditions led the company to mistitle the promotional releases as His Band and Street Choir and prepare an incorrectly ordered track listing. At the end of "I'll Be Your Lover, Too" an unedited conversation is left on the finished record, which Peter Mills notes is an example of the album's rough edges. Janet Planet designed the album cover and wrote the sleeve notes, which sound "a little desperate", in the words of Brian Hinton, as she wrote, "This is the album that you must sing with, dance to, you must find a place for these songs somewhere in your life."

David Gahr took the gatefold photos of Morrison surrounded by his musicians with their wives and children at a party for Planet's son, Peter, born from a previous relationship. Morrison dismissed these photos as "rubbish". However, Johnny Rogan commented that the front cover looks far worse; it included a "hilarious" image of Morrison in a full-length kaftan. Morrison complained about the stereotypical front cover as well: "people think you're a hippie because of the long hair and beard. ... I'd bought the kaftan in Woodstock, and that's what people were wearing." Mills agrees that "Van Morrison was never a hippie, but this was as close as he came."

== Reception ==
=== Release ===
His Band and the Street Choir was first released on LP in November 1970 and was Morrison's third record to be produced for Warner Bros. It was re-released by the record company on CD in 1987, 1990 and 2005, and LP in 2008 with Rhino Records. On 30 October 2015, along with Astral Weeks, the album was remastered and reissued by Warner Bros. Records with five session bonus tracks; three alternate takes, and two alternate versions of "I've Been Working" and "I'll Be Your Lover, Too".

His Band and the Street Choir peaked at number 32 on the Billboard 200, and at number 18 on the UK Album Chart. The album received a warm reception in North America—as Moondance had done—largely due to the success of "Domino", a sampler single that peaked at number 9 on the Billboard Hot 100. This single remains Morrison's biggest US hit (as of 2010), as it climbed one place higher than his 1967 hit "Brown Eyed Girl", from the album Blowin' Your Mind!. "Domino" was also a hit in the Netherlands, reaching number 22 on the Dutch Top 40. Jon Landau of Rolling Stone magazine attributed the success of "Domino" to the guitar figure at the beginning of the track, which he considered "not only a great way to start a single, but a fine way to begin the album". "Blue Money" debuted as the second single, faltering outside the Top 20 at number 23 in the US. The final single, "Call Me Up in Dreamland", managed only two weeks on the Billboard Hot 100, while reaching number 95; biographer Ken Brooks believed it deserved better. John Platania recalled that Morrison "had designs" on securing radio airplay for Street Choir, and the success of its singles reflected a growing audience and commercial appeal for his music.

=== Critical response ===
Professional ratings
Review scores
Source	Rating
AllMusic	4.5/5 stars
Christgau's Record Guide	A
Encyclopedia of Popular Music	3/5 stars
Music Story	5/5 stars
MusicHound Rock	5/5
Pitchfork	8.7/10
Q	3/5 stars
Rolling Stone	(favourable)
The Rolling Stone Album Guide	3.5/5 stars
Uncut	8/10

Reviewers generally praised Street Choir. Jon Landau of Rolling Stone compared it to Morrison's previous work:

"His Band and the Street Choir is a free album. It was recorded with minimal over-dubbing and was obviously intended to show the other side of Moondance. And if it has a flaw it is that, like Moondance, it is too much what it set out to be. A few more numbers with a gravity of 'Street Choir' would have made this album as close to perfect as anyone could have stood."

ZigZag magazine reviewer John Tobler felt, "even if it's inferior to Moondance, it is still better than eighty per cent of the records you've got in your collection." Robert Christgau wrote in The Village Voice, "A few humdrum cuts and an occasional minor lapse of taste make this a less compelling album than Moondance, which only means it wasn't one of the very best of 1970. The good cuts, especially 'Domino' and 'Blue Money,' are superb examples of Morrison's loose, allusive white r&b." Biographer Brian Hinton commented that His Band and the Street Choir is "vaguely reminiscent of Bob Dylan's Nashville Skyline". Singer-songwriter Elvis Costello identified His Band and the Street Choir as one of his 500 essential albums and "Street Choir" as one of his favorite songs. In 2006 Johnny Rogan called the songs on the album "a severe disappointment when compared to the material on the previous two albums."

== Morrison and the musicians' responses ==
Van Morrison regarded Street Choir poorly, as he told biographer Ritchie Yorke in 1973: "Somewhere along the line I lost control of that album. I'd rather not think about that album because it doesn't mean much in terms of where I was at ... the album didn't sell very well and I'm glad." Morrison first lost control of the album before its release, when it was retitled from Virgo's Fool to His Band and the Street Choir:

"Somebody else got control of it and got the cover and all that shit while I was on the West Coast. I knew what was happening to it, but it was like I couldn't stop it. I'd given my business thing over to someone else and although I had final approval on things, they just went ahead and did the wrong thing. They told the record company it was one thing and it wasn't. So the whole thing went wrong."

Despite this, assistant producer and drummer Dahaud Shaar recalled that Morrison had positive feelings towards the album at the time of its release.

Janet Planet holds the view that "There is much to love about the songs on this album: 'Blue Money', 'Crazy Face', 'Call Me Up in Dreamland', 'Domino' - these are just great songs in any era."

== Track listing ==
All songs written by Van Morrison.

Side one
No.	Title	Length
1.	"Domino"	3:06
2.	"Crazy Face"	2:56
3.	"Give Me a Kiss"	2:39
4.	"I've Been Working"	3:25
5.	"Call Me Up in Dreamland"	3:52
6.	"I'll Be Your Lover, Too"	3:57

Side two
No.	Title	Length
1.	"Blue Money"	3:46
2.	"Virgo Clowns"	4:10
3.	"Gypsy Queen"	3:16
4.	"Sweet Jannie"	2:11
5.	"If I Ever Needed Someone"	3:45
6.	"Street Choir"	4:43

2015 reissue bonus tracks
No.	Title	Length
13.	"Call Me Up in Dreamland" (take 10)	4:14
14.	"Give Me a Kiss" (take 3)	2:32
15.	"Gypsy Queen" (take 3)	4:13
16.	"I've Been Working" (alternate version)	4:25
17.	"I'll Be Your Lover, Too" (alternate version)	4:10

== Personnel ==
Musicians

- Van Morrison – lead vocals, guitar, harmonica, tenor saxophone (on "Crazy Face" and "Call Me Up in Dreamland")
- Alan Hand – piano, Hammond organ, celeste
- Keith Johnson – trumpet, Hammond organ
- John Klingberg – bass
- John Platania – electric and acoustic guitars, mandolin
- Jack Schroer – soprano, alto, and baritone saxophones, piano
- Dahaud Shaar (David Shaw) – drums, percussion, bass clarinet, backing vocals
- Judy Clay, Emily Houston, Jackie Verdell – backing vocals (on "If I Ever Needed Someone")

The Street Choir

- Larry Goldsmith
- Janet Planet
- Andrew Robinson
- Ellen Schroer
- Dahaud Shaar (David Shaw)
- Martha Velez

Production

- Van Morrison – producer
- Dahaud Shaar – assistant producer
- Elliot Scheiner – production coordinator, engineer
- Dixon Van Winkle, Ed Anderson, Mark Harman, Richard Lubash – assisting engineers
- David Gahr – photography
- Janet Planet – album design

== Charts ==
=== Album ===
Chart (1970)	Peak position
Australia (Kent Music Report)	32
UK Albums Chart	18
US Billboard 200	32
Dutch Albums Chart	48

=== Singles ===
Year	Single	Peak positions	
Year	Single	US	NED
1970	"Domino"	9	22
1971	"Blue Money"	23	—
1971	"Call Me Up in Dreamland"	95	—
"—" denotes releases that did not chart.
