= Call Me Up in Dreamland =

Single by Van Morrison

from the album His Band and the Street Choir
- A-side: "Call Me Up in Dreamland"
- B-side: "Street Choir"
- Released: April 1971
- Recorded: Summer 1970 at A&R Recording Studios in New York City
- Genre: Folk rock, R&B
- Length: 3:52
- Label: Warner Bros.
- Songwriter(s): Van Morrison
- Producer(s): Van Morrison

Van Morrison singles chronology
"Blue Money" (1971)	"Call Me Up in Dreamland" (1971)	"Wild Night" (1971)

"Call Me Up in Dreamland" is a song that was written by Northern Irish singer-songwriter, Van Morrison and included on his 1970 album, His Band and the Street Choir. Brian Hinton describes the song as "life on the road, with 'radio' as a verb and laughing sax."

== Recording and composition ==
The song was recorded in summer, 1970 at the A&R Recording Studios, 46th Street, New York, during the second His Band and the Street Choir sessions.

"Call Me Up in Dreamland" features a moderate 4/4 tempo. It is in the key of A major, with a chord sequence in the verses of A–E–D–A–D–E–A–D–A–E–D–A–D–E–A–D and the chorus of A–D–A–E–A–D–A–E–E♭–D–A. The song also has a tenor saxophone solo from Morrison. The song is composed in a gospel style and prominently features the vocal backing group the Street Choir.

== Chart performance ==
In June 1971 "Call Me Up in Dreamland" rose to No. 95 in the Billboard Hot 100 music charts.

According to Cash Box, the single release was "preceded by exceptional FM play and good AM in-LP picks."

Record World said that it "always sounded like a hit" and was "great stuff for rádio play."

== Personnel ==
- Van Morrison: vocal, guitar, tenor saxophone
- Alan Hand: piano, organ
- Keith Johnson: trumpet
- John Klingberg: bass
- John Platania: guitar
- Jack Schroer: soprano saxophone
- Dahaud Shaar (David Shaw): drums

The Street Choir

- Larry Goldsmith
- Janet Planet
- Andrew Robinson
- Ellen Schroer
- Dahaud Shaar
- Martha Velez
