= Softcore Jukebox =

2003 compilation album by Ladytron

Compilation album by Ladytron
- Released: 7 October 2003
- Recorded: 2003
- Genre: Electronica; post-punk; dream pop; dance-pop; new wave
- Length: 77:00
- Label: Emperor Norton
- Producer: Ladytron

Ladytron chronology
Light & Magic (2002)	Softcore Jukebox (2003)	Witching Hour (2005)

Softcore Jukebox is a compilation album put together by English electronic music band Ladytron. It was released on 7 October 2003 through Emperor Norton Records. It features different styles of music from rock to hip hop. It also includes two songs performed by Ladytron—the single remix of "Blue Jeans" renamed "Blue Jeans 2.0" and a cover of Tweet's "Oops Oh My".

== Background ==
Regarding this compilation, Daniel Hunt said: "We chose an unmixed format as the majority of these songs would be murdered if beat-matched... some of them are completely impossible to do so, best to leave the tracks as nature intended. From around 40 speculative selections, 18 were cleared by the labels/artists concerned for the final release. The cover photo was taken at 3am while the band were staying in a Swedish chateau during the Hultsfred Festival". Featuring band members Mira Aroyo and Helen Marnie, it references the cover art for Roxy Music's 1974 album Country Life.

== Reception ==
Professional ratings
Review scores
Source	Rating
AllMusic	3.5/5 stars
Pitchfork Media	(7/10)
Rolling Stone	2/5 stars
Spin	(A−)
Stylus Magazine	(A)
XLR8R	(positive)

Softcore Jukebox has received generally positive reviews from music critics. AllMusic rated the album 3 and half stars and mentioned that "while Softcore Jukebox is rather lengthy at 77 minutes, this multi-tasking collection -- which manages to be a mix album, an Invicta Hi-Fi mini-sampler, and a brief history of post-punk, dream pop, and dance -- is consistently entertaining".

In an A− review, Spin mentioned that "this painfully stylish electroclash quartet could have sprung fully formed from a coolhunter's forehead, but the role of DJ-mix tastemaker is one they were born to play". Andrew Unterberger of the Stylus Magazine gave an A rating and wrote "so no, Ladytron themselves might not have composed most of the music here, but they did compile 18 great songs, several of which you've probably never even heard of before, into an impeccable party mix which might be the best single disc of music you'll hear all year. And for that, Ladytron's efforts should be rewarded".

According to Rob Mitchum from Pitchfork, "they've created a fantastic dance-party playlist, but one that could just as easily have been posted on their website as a guide-map through the Soulseek wilderness". The compilation was rated 7.0 out of 10. Softcore Jukebox has been described by Carleton Curtis from XLR8R as "a veritable user's guide to good taste".

== Track listing ==
1. "Soon" – My Bloody Valentine
2. "Hit the North, Part 1" – The Fall
3. "What's a Girl to Do" – Cristina
4. "Peng" – Dondolo
5. "The 15th" – Wire
6. "Blue Jeans 2.0" – Ladytron
7. "Saviour Piece" – Snap Ant
8. "Big" – New Fast Automatic Daffodils
9. "Feel Good Hit of the Fall" – !!!
10. "Teenage Daughter" – Fat Truckers
11. "Hey Mami" (Sharaz Mix) – Fannypack
12. "Manila" (Headman Remix) – Seelenluft
13. "You Got the Love" – The Source featuring Candi Staton
14. "Crazy Girls" – Codec and Flexor
15. "Oops Oh My" – Ladytron
16. "Send Me a Postcard" – Shocking Blue
17. "Twins" – Pop Levi
18. "Some Velvet Morning" – Lee Hazlewood and Nancy Sinatra

== Charts ==
Chart (2002)	Peak position
US Top Electronic Albums (Billboard)	24
