= Blue Jeans (Ladytron song) =

Single by Ladytron

from the album Light & Magic
- Released: 10 March 2003
- Recorded: 2002
- Genre: New wave; synthpop; shoegaze
- Length: 3:46
- Label: Telstar
- Songwriter(s): Daniel Hunt
- Producer(s): Ladytron

Ladytron singles chronology
"Seventeen" (2002)	"Blue Jeans" (2003)	"Evil" (2003)

Music video
- "Blue Jeans" on YouTube

"Blue Jeans" is the second single from the album Light & Magic by the music group Ladytron. A rockier version titled "Blue Jeans 2.0" featured on the mix compilation Softcore Jukebox.

The music video of "Blue Jeans" featured the band members and a drummer playing the song in a white room. The video was filmed in black and white with a blue tint added. The audio track is "Blue Jeans 2.0" instead of the original song.

== Track listing ==
=== CD single ===
1. "Blue Jeans" (single version) – 3:46
2. "Blue Jeans" (Josh Wink's Vocal Interpretation) – 6:06
3. "Seventeen" (Slam Remix) – 7:28

=== 7" ===
1. "Blue Jeans" (single version)
2. "Blue Jeans" (Interpol Remix)

=== 12" ===
1. "Blue Jeans" (single version)
2. "Blue Jeans" (Josh Wink's Vocal Interpretation)
3. "Blue Jeans" (Josh Wink's Dub Interpretation)

== Charts ==
Chart (2003)	Peak position
UK Singles Chart	43
