= Blue Honey =

Single by Pop Levi

from the album The Return To Form Black Magick Party
- Released: September 4, 2006
- Recorded: 2006
- Genre: Indie pop
- Length: 4:03 (CD) ??:?? (7")
- Label: Counter Records
- Songwriter: Pop Levi

Pop Levi singles chronology
"Reindeer In My Heart" (2004)	"Blue Honey" (2006)	"Sugar Assault Me" (2007)

"Blue Honey" is the first single from debut full-length album by English musician Pop Levi and was released on September 4, 2006. It is also included in the Amorphous Androgynous compilation, A Monstrous Psychedelic Bubble Exploding in Your Mind: Volume 1.

== Track listings ==
=== Extended Play CD ===
1. "Blue Honey Listen"
2. "(A Style Called) Cryin' Chic"
3. "Mornin' Light"
4. "Baby Again" [Midnight Version]
5. "Skip Ghetto" [Echo Park Version]

=== 7" Single ===
1. "Blue Honey"
2. "(A Style Called) Cryin' Chic"

=== 10" Single ===
1. "Blue Honey"
2. "(A Style Called) Cryin' Chic"
3. "Baby Again (Midnight Version)"

== Video ==
The original video for the 2005 single release on Invicta Hi-Fi Records was directed by Jackie Passmore. Later, with subsequent 2006 re-release on Counter Records, another version of the video was directed by Christian Swegal of Factory Features
