= Medicine (Pop Levi album) =

Studio album by Pop Levi
- Released: 13 November 2012
- Genre: Glam rock; electro funk
- Length: 40:45
- Label: Counter

Pop Levi chronology
Levitation Vol. 1 (2011)	Medicine (2012)

Professional ratings
Aggregate scores
Source	Rating
Metacritic	55/100
Review scores
Source	Rating
AllMusic	3/5 stars
Consequence of Sound	F
DIY	3/5 stars
Exclaim!	5/10
The Line of Best Fit	6.5/10
NME	2.5/5 stars
The Skinny	3/5 stars

Medicine is the third studio album by English musician Pop Levi. It was released on 12 November 2012 by Counter Records, an imprint of Ninja Tune.

== Critical reception ==
Medicine was met with "mixed or average" reviews from critics. At Metacritic, which assigns a weighted average rating out of 100 to reviews from mainstream publications, this release received an average score of 55 based on 9 reviews.

Writing for AllMusic, Tim Sendra explained: "Most of the record is very straight-ahead and trad-sounding. While Levi does play a pretty convincing rocker with his elfin, Bolan-pretty voice and the nicely punchy production, the songs overall come off a little clichéd, and the process of stripping down the sound removed too much of what was interesting on Levi’s previous efforts." Bryant Kitching of Consequence of Sound gave the release an unfavourable review by giving it an "F", while noting that "Despite the occasional glimpse of colorful ingenuity, Medicine is an utterly sour experience." At Exclaim!, Michael Edwards said: "Levi hasn't exactly grown with each and every album, and his wheel spinning has gotten the better of him again, because, apart from a couple of catchy tunes, Medicine isn't very exciting. "

In a review for The Line of Best Fit, Tim Lee gave the release a 6.5 out of 10, writing: "There are times on Medicine where there is enough self-referential nodding and winking going on to give yourself whiplash. Levi is exactly the kind of lunatic you want making music, Medicine is too much of a cipher to be anything more than a fleeting fancy."

== Track listing ==
Medicine track listing
No.	Title	Length
1.	"Strawberry Shake"	3:41
2.	"Motorcycle 666"	3:44
3.	"Rock Solid"	3:27
4.	"Police $ign"	3:05
5.	"Coming Down"	2:41
6.	"Medicine"	3:58
7.	"Bye-Byes"	3:27
8.	"Terrifying"	2:52
9.	"Midnite Runaround"	2:54
10.	"Records"	3:35
11.	"Remember, Remember"	3:43
12.	"You Understand"	3:38

iTunes bonus track version
No.	Title	Length
13.	"Remember, Remember" (Starlight & Wonder Remix)	3:45
14.	"Motorcycle 666" (Starlight & Wonder Remix)	3:35

== Personnel ==
Credits adapted from AllMusic.

Musicians

- Richard Levi – vocals
- Luke Muscatelli – bass
- Marius Simonsen – drums

Production

- Mozambique Courier – engineer
- Jonas Raabe – engineer, mixing
- Max Gilkes – mastering
- Travis Huff – mixing
