= Pop Levi =

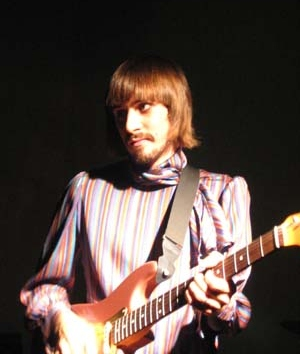
- Pop Levi at The Good Ship, London, 2006

Background information
- Also known as: Jr. Hi, Mozambique Courier
- Born: Jonathan James Mark Levi; 22 September 1977 (age 49); Surrey, England
- Genres: Rock; pop; avant-garde; hip hop; R&B; industrial
- Occupations: Musician, record producer, filmmaker
- Labels: Counter, Invicta Hi-Fi, Neon Gold

Pop Levi (born Jonathan James Mark Levi, 22 September 1977) is an English singer, multi-instrumentalist and record producer.

== Biography ==
Levi grew up in the suburbs of Birmingham and attended Shrewsbury School, a public school in Shropshire between 1991 and 1994 where he would skip church to write songs in the basement. In 1997, Levi re-located to Liverpool to study at LIPA and formed the experimental instrumental band Super Numeri with Karl Webb and James Morgan who signed to Ninja Tune in 2002 and released albums "Great Aviaries" in 2003 and "The Welcome Table" in 2005. During this period, Levi also played bass for Ladytron live and on the album Witching Hour.

In 2004, Levi released singles "Rude Kinda Love" and "Reindeer In My Heart" on the independent "Invicta Hi-Fi" label set up by Daniel Hunt of Ladytron. A planned follow-up single in 2005 entitled "Kissed Her Sister" was shelved along with the album "Foxwatch", and Levi formed The Emergencies with organ player Jake Field and Zukanican members, rhythm guitarist Dominic Lewington (AKA Domino), bass player Harry Sumnall and drummer James Pagella. The band played regularly around Liverpool as "Pop Levi & The Emergencies" including slots at the Merseyside Unity Music Festival and Unite Against Racism Festival. Now backed by The Emergencies, Levi released "Blue Honey", his last single on "Invicta Hi-Fi", before signing to Ninja Tune. After signing the new deal, Levi moved to Los Angeles which resulted in The Emergencies disbanding. With Lewington still on board, Levi recruited drummer Marius Simonsen and bass player Luke Muscatelli (AKA Lucky Beaches) and the band moved to the US, living together in the same house in Echo Park, Los Angeles. The new backing band was named "Woman".

In February 2007, Levi released his debut solo album on Counter Records, an imprint specifically created for Levi by Ninja Tune. The Return to Form Black Magick Party was self-produced and recorded over several years, solely on a lap top & D16 recording machine, at Liverpool studio/rehearsal space The Kif (where a previous Super Numeri album was recorded) and whilst on tour with Ladytron in a number of different locations in "England, China, France, Greece, LA, New York" such as "on trains, in planes, in warehouses, on the top of Cathedrals, at the beach, in bathrooms, hotel rooms and tombs. I made sure to capture the first take of everything I recorded and then took the tracks to Sacramento to be mixed". The album was toured extensively across the US, UK, Europe and Australia, and was listed as one of Lauren Laverne's favourite artists to make it big in 2007 on BBC Two's The Culture Show.

In July 2008, Levi released the follow-up album Never Never Love, which was preceded by the single "Dita Dimoné" which made BBC Radio 6's 'Record Of The Week'. Levi set out to make the follow-up, in contrast to the loose feel of the debut, sound artificial and soulless, that it sounded "like Japanese toys falling in and out of love with each other". The album was recorded at Westbeach Recorders and Westlake Recording Studios, in the same room Quincy Jones recorded Michael Jackson's Thriller and Off The Wall albums. Following the recording of the album, Lewington was asked to leave, returning to England to pursue solo projects, while Simonsen returned to Norway and joined pop band Montée, leaving Levi with no band to tour the album. Levi and Muscatelli played sporadic shows across LA as a duo, with Muscatelli shifting from bass guitar to synth bass. Aside from a handful of solo acoustic shows in London, there was also no tour to support the album in the UK either.

2008 also saw the emergence of Levi's World Empire, Inc. film and music production company. In September, the 37th Festival Nouveau Cinema in Montréal held the world premiere of You Don't Gotta Run, a surreal 37-minute docu-featurette directed by auteur Lucky Beaches and starring Levi.

A planned double album of home demos and outtakes entitled "Micro Sex Tapes", which was originally set for release in 2009 was never released. A stand-alone double A-Side single "Police $ign/Terrifying (For Kenneth Anger)" was released in June 2009, with a new lineup featuring drummer Hayden Scott. An early version of Police $ign was featured in the in-game soundtrack of Gran Turismo 5.

In 2009, Levi travelled to Norway where drummer Simonsen was now based to record his third album, tentatively titled "Records", which was intended to be live and raw sounding. The album was recorded in a mountain-top converted barn and re-titled "Smack Musick", however, after being left in a state of limbo for 2 years, with the last scheduled release date being March 2011, it was eventually shelved.

In April 2011, "Levitation Vol. 1" was temporarily made available as a free download via worldempireinc.com. The 14 track mixtape was recorded and mixed mostly in 2010-11 at The White Arc, Levi's studio in Los Angeles. The release was followed up by "Motorcycle 666" in July 2011, recorded during the "Smack Musick" sessions in Norway. The b-side "Rock Solid" was recorded at The White Arc. The single was backed by select dates in London and Liverpool, with a new lineup with Muscatelli now on guitar.

Levi has also produced and performed with Canadian-born artist and American Apparel model Bunny Holiday in Los Angeles and on a five-city tour of China. In 2010 Pop Levi and Bunny Holiday directed the music video for former N.W.A star Arabian Prince's "Let's Hit The Beach" single on Stones Throw Records. The duo also directed a music video for "The Look" to promote the 2010 VansXStüssy shoe collaboration.

Levi's song "Sugar Assault Me Now" was used in the trailers for the 2010 film, Get Him to the Greek and his music has also been featured in numerous television shows including Chuck, Entourage and 90210.

In November 2012, Levi released his third solo studio album Medicine, his last for Counter Records. The album was preceded by single "Strawberry Shake", featuring a remix by Tom Vek, and followed by 5-track EP "Starlight & Wonder Vol. 1". An album showcase gig set to take place at The Lexington, London was cancelled at the last minute due to change in artist management.

In November 2013, Levi released "Secrets" under the pseudonym Jr. Hi via Neon Gold Records, featuring guest vocals by The Weeknd. Levi's management Roxwell had previously confirmed that Levi had been working with a number of artists including The Weeknd, Kimbra, Switch and Robert DeLong. In February 2014 a second track "Trillion Girls" was released, featuring guest vocals from Childish Gambino.

In December 2013, Levi wrote and produced the Childish Gambino song "The Party" for the album Because the Internet, which was nominated for Best Rap Album at the 2015 Grammy Awards.

In September 2014, Levi and Bunny Holiday formed the Industrial/Electronic duo crush_DLX, releasing through their SoundCloud 1 track a day for 370 days in an Audio Series format called MICRO SEX TAPES 370º. The series has produced collaborations with Ariel Pink and Cabaret Voltaire founder Stephen Mallinder.

In 2020, Levi signed to Toronto based label Boiled Records. On 2 December 2020, he released the album Mark Of Paradise. This was quickly followed up by Juicy Diamond on 17 March 2021.

In February 2022, Levi started a new band with Muscatelli under the project name "The Big Kill".

== Discography ==
=== Solo ===
Albums

- The Return to Form Black Magick Party CD/LP (UK/US) (2007, Counter Records)
- Never Never Love CD/LP (UK/US) (2008, Ninja Tune/Counter Records)
- Medicine CD/LP (UK/US) (2012, Counter Records/World Empire, Inc.)
- Mark Of Paradise Digital (2020, Boiled Records)
- Juicy Diamond Digital (2021, Boiled Records)
- Invisible Music Cassette/Digital (2021, Lo Recordings)
- Island Girls Digital (2023, Dive Up)
- A Tribute To Soledad Miranda Digital (2024, Pop Levi YouTube Channel)
- Glam Trash Digital (2024, Pop Levi YouTube Channel)

EPs

- Blue Honey CD/Digi-EP (UK/US) (2006, Counter Records)
- Sugar Assault Me Now CD/Digi-EP (UK/US) (2007, Counter Records)
- Never Never Love CD/Digi-EP (UK/US) (2008, Counter Records)
- Dita Dimoné CD/Digi-EP (UK/US) (2008, Counter Records)
- Starlight & Wonder Vol. 1 Digi-EP (UK/US) (2012, Counter Records/World Empire, Inc.)
- She Walked In Digi-EP (2023, Dive Up)

Remix

- Island Girls (Remixes) Digital (2023, Dive Up)

Singles

- "Rude Kinda Love" / "Clearly Dearly" 7" (UK) (2004, Invicta Hi-Fi)
- "Reindeer In My Heart" / "Hayley Square" [Instrumental]' 7" (UK) (2004, Invicta Hi-Fi)
- "Kissed Her Sister" / "Supermarket Woman" Promo-only CD (UK) (2005, Invicta Hi-Fi)
- "Blue Honey" / "Mournin' Light" 7" (UK) (2005, Invicta Hi-Fi)
- "Blue Honey" 7"/10" (UK) (2006, Counter Records)
- "Sugar Assault Me Now" 7"/10" (UK) (2007, Counter Records)
- "Pick Me Up Uppercut" 7" (UK) (2007, Counter Records)
- "Never Never Love" 7" (UK) (2008, Counter Records)
- "Dita Dimoné" 7" (UK) (2008, Counter Records)
- "Police $ign" / "Terrifying (For Kenneth Anger)" 7" (UK) (2009, Counter Records)
- "Motorcycle 666" / "Rock Solid" Digi-single (UK/US) (2011, Counter Records)
- "Strawberry Shake" Digi-single (UK/US) (2012, Counter Records)
- "Spell On Me" Digi-single UK/US (2018, Pop Levi)
- "She Was A Girl" feat. Ariel Pink Digital (2019, Dive Up) non-album single
- "Touch Of You" (2020, Boiled Records)
- "Mark Of Paradise" (2020, Boiled Records)
- "Shoulda Known Better" (2020, Boiled Records)
- "Shona" (2020, Boiled Records)
- "Tia" (2021, Boiled Records)
- "I Love You" (2021, Boiled Records)
- "Time Bomb" (2021, Boiled Records)
- "Birthday Girl" (2021, Boiled Records)
- "Rainy Day Lovers" (2022, Dive Up)
- "Chantelle Delaney" (2022, Dive Up)
- "Island Girls" (2022, Dive Up)
- "Stars in Rome" (2022, Dive Up)
- "Quarterback" (2023, Dive Up)
- "Still In Love With You" (2023, Dive Up)
- "My Pamela" (2023, Dive Up)
- "Little Sparrow" (2023, Dive Up)
- "Across The Universe" (2023, Dive Up) non-album single
- "Jeannie Janey" (2024, Dive Up)
- "Baby Rush" (2024, Dive Up)

Mixtape

- Levitation Vol. 1 Mixtape (2011, World Empire, Inc.) withdrawn/unavailable

=== w/ Snap Ant ===
Albums

- Pop Levi & Snap Ant - Music For Silent Horror Films (2024, Pop Levi YouTube Channel)
- Blockers - Spirit Street (2024, Pop Levi YouTube Channel)

=== w/ Super Numeri ===
Albums

- Great Aviaries CD/LP (UK/US) (2003, Ninja Tune)
- The Enochian Way CD (JP) (2005, Counter Records)
- The Welcome Table CD/LP (UK/US) (2005, Ninja Tune)

Singles

- "The Electric Horse Garden" 7" (UK) (2002, Ninja Tune)
- "The Coastal Bird Scene (Parts 1, 2 & 3)" 12" (UK) (2003, Ninja Tune)

=== w/ crush_DLX ===
Mixtapes

- Micro Sex Tapes Collection 1 Download (Web) (2015, self-released)
- Micro Sex Tapes Collection 2 Download (Web) (2015, self-released)

=== w/ Zukanican ===
EPs

- E 5Number 10" (2004, Pickled Egg Records)

=== w/ Ladytron ===
Albums

- Softcore Jukebox CD/LP (UK/US) (2003, Emperor Norton)
- Light & Magic CD (UK/US) (2004 Re-release, Emperor Norton)
- Witching Hour CD/LP (UK/US) (2005, Island Records)

Singles

- "Evil" CD (UK) (2003, Telstar)

== Filmography ==
- You Don't Gotta Run documentary (dir. Lucky Beaches) Hand-numbered limited (50) edition DVD (2008, World Empire, Inc.)
- Cheapo Gnostic Silent Short Film (dir. Pop Levi & MRK) Digital release (2024, YouTube)

=== Music videos ===
The following are the music videos starring and/or directed by Pop Levi.

Year	Song	Artist	Director	Label
2020	Mark Of Paradise	Pop Levi	Pop Levi	Boiled Records
2020	Touch Of You	Pop Levi	Pop Levi	Boiled Records
2012	Coming Down	Pop Levi	Lucky Beaches	Counter Records
2012	Strawberry Shake	Pop Levi	Bunny Holiday	Counter Records
2011	Motorcycle 666	Pop Levi	William Overby	Counter Records
2010	Chyna Girl	Bunny Holiday	Pop Levi	World Empire, Inc.
2010	Teach Me How To Bunny	Bunny Holiday	Pop Levi & Bunny Holiday	World Empire, Inc.
2010	Let's Hit The Beach	Arabian Prince	Pop Levi & Bunny Holiday	Stones Throw
2010	The Look	Bunny Holiday	Bunny Holiday & Pop Levi	World Empire, Inc. for Vans
2010	Tender Young Flesh	Bunny Holiday	Pop Levi & Bunny Holiday	World Empire, Inc.
2010	Tender Young Flesh (Live Cam)	Bunny Holiday	Pop Levi & Bunny Holiday	World Empire, Inc.
2009	Terrifying (For Kenneth Anger)	Pop Levi	Dylan Mulick	Counter Records
2008	Everything & Finally	Pop Levi	Auntie Mum	Counter Records
2008	Semi-Babe	Pop Levi	Aaron Willmer & Martin Dobson	Counter Records
2008	Dita Dimoné	Pop Levi	Neil Mclean	Counter Records
2008	Mai's Space	Pop Levi	Auntie Mum	Counter Records
2008	Never Never Love	Pop Levi	Neil Mclean	Counter Records
2007	Pick-Me-Up Uppercut	Pop Levi	Mox & Pop Levi	Counter Records
2007	Pick-Me-Up Uppercut	Pop Levi	Brian Harty	Counter Records
2006	Sugar Assault Me Now	Pop Levi	Brian Harty	Counter Records
2006	Reindeer In My Heart	Pop Levi	Pop Levi	Invicta Hi-Fi
2006	Blue Honey	Pop Levi	Christian Swegal	Counter Records
2005	Blue Honey	Pop Levi	Jackie Passmore	Invicta Hi-Fi
2004	Rude Kinda Love	Pop Levi	Good Times	Invicta Hi-Fi

== In media ==
- The song "Wannamama" from the album Never Never Love was featured in the second-season episode "Chuck Versus the Best Friend" of Chuck.
- The song "Wannamama" was on the soundtrack to the movie American Reunion.
- The song "Police $ign" was included on the soundtrack to the 2010 sim racing game Gran Turismo 5.
