= Domino (Van Morrison song) =

Single by Van Morrison

from the album His Band and the Street Choir
- B-side: "Sweet Jannie"
- Released: 15 November 1970
- Recorded: Spring 1970
- Studio: A&R Recording Studios, New York City
- Genre: R&B
- Length: 3:06
- Label: Warner Bros.
- Songwriter: Van Morrison
- Producer: Van Morrison

Van Morrison singles chronology
"Crazy Love" (1970)	"Domino" (1970)	"Blue Money" (1971)

Audio
- "Domino" on YouTube

"Domino" is a hit song written by Northern Irish singer-songwriter Van Morrison. It is the opening track of his fourth studio album, His Band and the Street Choir. This song is Morrison's personal musical tribute to New Orleans R&B singer and pianist Fats Domino.

It was released by Warner Bros. Records in October 1970 as the first of three singles from the album. It reached number nine on the Billboard Hot 100 charts. As of 2021, "Domino" remains Morrison's highest-charting single ever, surpassing Morrison's signature song "Brown Eyed Girl", which had charted at number 10 in 1967.

== Recording and composition ==
Morrison had written the song several years before it was released in 1970. With Lewis Merenstein as producer, it was recorded on three takes dating back to sessions in autumn 1968, at Warners Publishing Studio in New York City. Another eight takes of the song were recorded during several sessions in 1969 at the same studio and again with Merenstein as producer. The version released on His Band and the Street Choir was recorded in spring 1970, at A & R Recording Studios in New York City with Elliot Scheiner as engineer. Music journalist Erik Hage writes that one of the reasons for not releasing it until 1970 may have been that Morrison believed it could be a hit single and held it back to avoid it falling under the year-long single clause in his contract release with Web IV. This release stated that the music publishing company would be entitled to one half of the copyright to any single released by Morrison in the year between September 1968 and September 1969. Morrison had received some high-profile promotion when he appeared on a cover of Rolling Stone and was interviewed by Happy Traum in July 1970. As related by Morrison, he was subsequently encouraged by Warner Bros. to release radio-friendly singles: "The record company was asking me for singles, so I made some like "Domino", which was actually longer but got cut down." In fulfilling Warner's desire for a hit song, Hage wrote that the "bright, tight, and groovy "Domino" fits the bill. The lyrics hit on a frequent Morrison theme, renewal, ('I think it's time for a change'), and the vocal dynamics, punctuated by 'Lord have mercy' nod to gospel and James Brown (who pulled heavily from gospel himself)."

== Response ==
Robert Christgau, writing in the Village Voice in 1971, described "Domino" as one of the "superb examples of Morrison's loose, allusive white r&b."

Cash Box said of the song that "the melodic drive and rhythmic impact should set sparks flying at AM and FM stations." Record World said that it's "a fantastically intense hit offering."

Biographer Brian Hinton described it as "a punchy affair, with words that mean little, though threatening the whole feelgood thrust of the album... The music is something else again, toughly joyful, with an early Van hymn of praise to the radio..."

In a 1996 review, Thomas Ryan called the song "a riff-heavy and remarkably contagious example of Van Morrison's desire to pay tribute to his well of inspiration. Melodically and structurally, the song is purely his own, with horn charts and a syncopated riff that keep it continually exhilarating."

== Live performances ==
"Domino" was performed during the 1974 BBC 2 and Radio 2 simultaneous broadcast that consisted of one of Morrison's July 1973 performances at the Rainbow Theatre, London. In 1977, Morrison performed the song on The Midnight Special.

== Use in media ==
Morrison's former manager Harvey Goldsmith included the song as one of his eight Desert Island Discs on BBC Radio 4 on 5 July 2009. "Domino" was listed at No. 197 in Dave Marsh's 1989 book, The Heart of Rock and Soul: The 1001 Greatest Singles Ever Made.

== Other releases ==
The original recording of the song was re-released in 1990 on The Best of Van Morrison and in 2007 on Still on Top – The Greatest Hits. It was one of the tunes included on the 2003 (10 CD) set Ultimate Seventies Collection by Time-Life. A performance of the song is included on Morrison's 1974 double live album It's Too Late to Stop Now. This version of the song is also included on Van Morrison's 2007 compilation album Van Morrison at the Movies – Soundtrack Hits, as featured in the movie Clean and Sober.

=== Cover versions ===
Buddy Rich covered the song on his 1971 album, Different Drummer. In 1997, The Buckinghams covered it on Places in Five.

== Personnel ==
- Van Morrison – vocals, rhythm guitar
- Alan Hand – piano
- Keith Johnson – trumpet
- John Klingberg – bass
- John Platania – electric guitar
- Jack Schroer – alto and baritone saxophones
- Dahaud Shaar (David Shaw) – drums, backing vocals

== Charts ==
Chart (1970–71)	Peak position
Canada RPM Top Singles	8
Netherlands	22
U.S. Billboard Pop Singles	9
U.S. Cash Box Top 100	9
