= I'll Be Your Lover, Too =

Song by Van Morrison

from the album His Band and the Street Choir
- Released: 15 November 1970
- Recorded: Summer 1970
- Genre: Folk rock
- Length: 3:57
- Label: Warner Bros.
- Songwriter: Van Morrison
- Producer: Van Morrison

"I'll Be Your Lover, Too" is a song written by Northern Irish singer-songwriter Van Morrison. It appears on the album His Band and the Street Choir, released in 1970. It was also recorded in 2014 in a new big band arrangement and included on his 2024 album New Arrangements and Duets.

== Composition ==
Some have considered the song's music similar to that of Morrison's second studio album, Astral Weeks. The song is a moderate-tempoed acoustic ballad in 4/4 time, with one 5/8 bar before the vocal comes in. The song is in the key of G major, with the chord progression of Em-C-Em-C-Em-C-D-D.

== Personnel on the original release ==
- Van Morrison – guitar, vocal
- John Klingberg – bass guitar
- John Platania – guitar
- Dahaud Shaar (David Shaw) – drums
