= The Return to Form Black Magick Party =

The Return To Form Black Magick Party

Studio album by Pop Levi
- Released: February 2, 2007
- Recorded: 2006
- Genre: Glam rock
- Length: 44:01
- Label: Counter Records
- Producer: Pop Levi

Pop Levi chronology
The Return To Form Black Magick Party (2007)	Never Never Love (2008)

Singles from The Return To Form Black Magick Party
- 1. "Blue Honey" Released: September 2006; 2. "Sugar Assault Me Now" Released: January 2007; 3. "Pick Me Up Uppercut" Released: April 2007

Professional ratings
Review scores
Source	Rating
Pitchfork Media	8.0/10 link

The Return To Form Black Magick Party is the first full-length album by the musician Pop Levi (former Super Numeri member, Ladytron bass guitarist and remixer), released on February 2, 2007.

== Track listing ==
1. "Sugar Assault Me Now" - 3:00
2. "Blue Honey" - 4:03
3. "(A Style Called) Cryin' Chic" - 4:56
4. "Pick Me Up Uppercut" - 3:26
5. "Skip Ghetto" - 5:21
6. "Dollar Bill Rock" - 4:54
7. "Flirting" - 4:10
8. "Mournin' Light" - 3:32
9. "See My Lord" - 2:24
10. "Hades' Lady" - 4:25
11. "From The Day That You Were Born" - 3:46

== Singles ==
- "Blue Honey" (September 4, 2006)
- "Sugar Assault Me Now" (January 29, 2007)
- "Pick Me Up Uppercut" (April 16, 2007)
