= Never Never Love (album) =

Studio album by Pop Levi
- Released: 14 July 2008
- Recorded: 2008
- Genre: Rock/Pop
- Label: Counter Records
- Producer: Pop Levi

Pop Levi chronology
The Return to Form Black Magick Party (2007)	Never Never Love (2008)

Singles from Never Never Love
- 1. "Never Never Love" Released: 28 April 2008; 2. "Dita Dimone" Released: 23 June 2008

Never Never Love is the second album by musician Pop Levi (former Super Numeri member, Ladytron bassist and remixer), released on 14 July 2008.

== Reception ==
Professional ratings
Review scores
Source	Rating
AllMusic	3/5 stars
Pitchfork	6.0/10

AllMusic rated the album four stars, describing it as "a satisfying step forward for Pop Levi -- a congruent collection of tunes that temper an enjoyable excess of rhetoric with a workman-like adherence to properly serving a hook." Pitchfork assigned it a rating of 6.0 out of ten, referring to it as "a willfully slight set of accomplished compositions just as full of hooks as the first Hellraiser film."

== Track listing ==
1. 'Wannamama'
2. 'Never Never Love'
3. 'Dita Dimoné'
4. 'Semi-Babe'
5. 'Fire On Your Feet'
6. 'Mai's Space'
7. 'You Don't Gotta Run'
8. 'Oh God'
9. 'Everything & Finally'
10. 'Love You Straight'
11. 'Call The Operator'
12. 'Calling Me Down'
13. 'Fountain Of Lies'

== Singles ==
- "Never Never Love" (28 April 2008)
- "Dita Dimoné" (23 June 2008)
