= So Sweet Records =

So Sweet Records is an independent record label, based out of Santa Monica, California. So Sweet Records has branches in the US, UK, and Japan.

So Sweet Records is owned by Tehmina Adaya, a Los Angeles–based entrepreneur, hotelier and music enthusiast. Vice President Paul Nugent manages A&R, while the label itself is managed by Yuki Hoang. Adaya and Nugent partnered in 2005 to start the label.

== Active roster ==
- Le Castle Vania
- Computer Club
- Foamo
- Eli Smith
- Frankmusik
- Sharkslayer
- Bird Peterson
- Digiraatii

== Collaborations ==
=== Clothing ===
- So me
- MADSTEEZ
- Kesh
- DEMONBABIES
- GRNappletree

=== Previous releases ===
- Shinichi Osawa
- Dan Deacon

=== Remixes ===
- Simian Mobile Disco
- Kissy Sell Out
- Felix Cartal
