= Evil (Ladytron song) =

Single by Ladytron

from the album Light & Magic
- Released: 30 June 2003
- Recorded: 2003
- Genre: Electropop; synthpop
- Length: 4:13
- Label: Telstar
- Songwriter: Daniel Hunt
- Producer: Ladytron

Ladytron singles chronology
| "Blue Jeans" (2003) | "Evil" (2003) | "Sugar" (2005) |

Music video
- "Evil (UK version)" on YouTube

"Evil" is the third single from the album Light & Magic by English electronic music group Ladytron. It was released in 2003 and reached a position of #44 on the UK Singles Chart.

== Track listing ==
=== CD 1 single ===
1. "Evil" (Radio Edit) – 4:13
2. "Oops (Oh My)" – 2:50
3. "Evil" (Tony Senghore's Automatic Vocal Remix) – 8:07

=== CD 2 single ===
1. "Evil" (Axl Of Evil Mix) – 4:07
2. "Cracked LCD" – 2:35
3. "Evil" (M-Factor Remix) – 7:51

=== 12" ===
1. "Evil" (Tony Senghore's Automatic Vocal Remix) – 8:07
2. "Evil" (Axl Of Evil Mix)" – 3:20
3. "Evil" (M-Factor Remix) – 7:49
4. "Evil" (Ewan Pearson Remix) – 6:46

== Music video ==
Two music videos have been released for "Evil". One was released in the United Kingdom, and the other in the United States. Both feature the Ewan Pearson remix of the song, as opposed to the album version. The remix can be found on Ladytron's iTunes-Exclusive "Remixed & Rare" Light & Magic compilation.

The UK version depicts an elderly man (played by Derek Smith) examining a medieval tapestry concerning a young woman surrounded by demons (the woman is presumed to be a witch). He is shocked to discover the images on the manuscript coming to life. The manuscript pans down to show the woman being abducted by aliens, then feasting with them. Later, she is sentenced to death by a queen on her throne for associating with demons, as the people of the time understand the experience. As the man looks at the final part of the manuscript, the woman is strapped to a chair and lowered into an ocean by a man holding a cross. The band members are present only as demons and nymphs bearing witness to the events taking place.

The US version has no plot, and consists of the members of Ladytron playing the song in front of a white background.
