= Tommy & The High Pilots =

Beta Play
- Origin: Santa Barbara, California, United States
- Genres: Rock, pop, alternative
- Label: Redbird
- Members: Tommy Cantillon; Michael Cantillon; Mike Dyer
- Past members: Steven Libby; Matt Palermo
- Website: https://www.facebook.com/betaplaymusic

Beta Play (formerly Tommy & the High Pilots) is an alternative rock band from Santa Barbara, California. The band consists of lead vocalist/guitarist Tommy Cantillon, keyboardist Michael Cantillon, and bassist Mike Dyer.

== Background ==
Originally performing as Tommy & the High Pilots, the band released a number of albums, including Everynight, American Riviera, Only Human, and Tommy & the High Pilots: Live at Studio Delux.

In 2014, the band underwent a change, reforming and rebranding as Beta Play in early 2015. According to lead vocalist, Tommy Cantillon, the members began to feel like a new group after the release of "Only Human" in 2013. Their new style, coupled with Cantillon's discomfort being the only member with his name in the group's title, prompted them to change their name. Cantillon drew his inspiration for the new name from the boxes of Betamax video tapes his father had left in the garage where he wrote the band's music.

The band released a self-titled 5-song EP in 2015, featuring the single "Heaven Is Under The Sun."

== Members ==
=== Current members ===
- Tommy Cantillon - lead vocals, guitar
- Michael Cantillon - guitar, keyboard
- Mike Dyer - bass

=== Former Members ===
- Steven Libby - bass
- Matt Palermo - drums

=== Live Members ===
- Dan Moore (2019 - current)

== Discography ==
As Beta Play

Year	Album
2015	Beta Play

As Tommy & the High Pilots

Year	Album
2009	Everynight
2010	American Riviera
2011	Sawhorse Sessions
2013	Only Human
2013	Tommy and the High Pilots - Live at Studio Delux
