= Sugar (Ladytron song) =

Single by Ladytron

from the album Witching Hour
- Released: 2005
- Recorded: 2004
- Genre: Electronic rock; shoegaze
- Length: 2:54
- Label: Island
- Songwriter(s): Daniel Hunt
- Producer(s): Ladytron; Jim Abbiss

Ladytron singles chronology
"Evil" (2003)	"Sugar" (2005)	"Destroy Everything You Touch" (2005)

Music video
- "Sugar" on YouTube

"Sugar" is the first single from the album Witching Hour by English electronic music band Ladytron. This song featured on the video game Need for Speed: Carbon and Need for Speed Carbon Own the City. It charted at number 45 in the United Kingdom.

== Track listing ==
CD single

1. "Sugar" - 2:54
2. "Tender Talons" - 3:30
3. "Sugar" (Jagz Kooner Remix) - 5:23

7"

1. "Sugar"
2. "Fighting in Built Up Areas"

12"

1. "Sugar" - 2:50
2. "Sugar" (Archigram Remix) - 6:13
3. "Sugar" (Playgroup Vocal) - 5:09
4. "Sugar" ('M' Ladytronomy Remix) - 5:36
