= Disco Clone =

Disco song released in 1978

Single by Cristina
- Released: 1978
- Recorded: May–June 1978
- Studio: Blank Tape Studios
- Genre: Disco
- Length: 4:07
- Label: ZE
- Songwriter: Ronald Melrose
- Producer: John Cale

Cristina singles chronology
"Disco Clone" (1978)	"Is That All There Is?" (1980)

"Disco Clone" is a song by American singer Cristina and written by Ronald Melrose. It was released as a single on ZE Records in 1978.

== Background ==
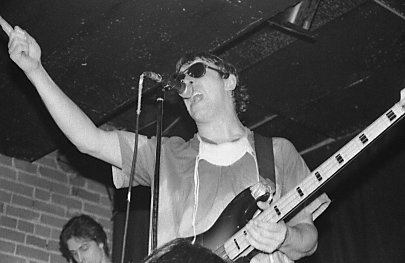
John Cale produced the original version of "Disco Clone".

"Disco Clone" was written by Ronald Melrose, a classmate of Cristina's from Harvard University. Her boyfriend Michael Zilkha wanted to take advantage of the disco boom and record the song. She called it "the worst song I have ever heard" and decided to perform it as a "Brechtian pastiche".

Tony de Portago, a friend of Cristina's, was the first to record the male vocals for "Disco Clone", but his were thrown out as sounding "too foreign" and "insufficiently jaded". Anthony Haden-Guest recorded the part in both English and French, which appear on song's first release. Kevin Kline, a little known actor at the time, appears on the re-release. Tom Moulton was approached to mix the track, but he did not want to be involved with something that mocked disco. Island Records founder Chris Blackwell mixed it instead.

The song's writer, Ronald Melrose, later became an arranger and musical director on Broadway shows, including Jersey Boys.

== Composition ==
"Disco Clone"
The recording uses a disco rhythm with a large string section.

"Disco Clone" uses a common disco rhythm, with a four-on-the-floor bass drum pattern and prominent hi-hat. It features a large string section, with 24 violinists double tracked. The song's lyrics poke fun at the idea of men wanting to hook up with attractive women who look alike.

== Release ==
The original version of "Disco Clone" had a limited release of 1,500 twelve-inch singles, the first release by Zilkha's fledgling label ZE Records. It received a re-release shortly after. The re-release includes a remix that was later retitled "The Ballad of Immoral Manufacture", in reference to "The Ballad of Immoral Earnings" from Brecht's The Threepenny Opera. The single was not commercially successful.

== Track listings ==
- Original 12" release
1. "Disco Clone" (English Version) – 4:13
2. "Disco Clone" (French Version) – 4:03
- 12" re-release
1. "Disco Clone" (Disco Mix) – 7:43
2. "Disco Clone" (Single Version) – 4:07
3. "Disco Clone" (Clone Instrumental) – 8:14
