= Playgirl (song) =

2000 single by Ladytron

Single by Ladytron

from the album 604
- Released: 26 June 2000
- Recorded: 1999
- Genre: Electropop; synth-pop
- Length: 3:51
- Label: Invicta Hi-Fi; Emperor Norton
- Songwriter(s): Ladytron
- Producer(s): Ladytron; Lance Thomas

Ladytron singles chronology
"He Took Her to a Movie" (1999)	"Playgirl" (2000)	"Commodore Rock" (2000)

Music video
- "Playgirl" on YouTube

"Playgirl" is the second single from the album 604 by the electronic music group Ladytron. In 2001, the single re-release peaked at number 89 on the UK Singles Chart.

== Reception ==
Drowned in Sound described Playgirl as a "hymn to small town claustrophobia and dissolute femininity in a style of knowing poetic allure" which "warms the cockles of the heart of the true dissenter." It ranked at number 25 on Select Magazine's Best Singles of 2000.

== Track listing ==
=== Promo Maxi CD, UK (2000) ===
1. "Playgirl" (Original Version) – 3:51
2. "Playgirl" (Zombie Nation Remix) – 5:46
3. "Playgirl" (Felix Da Housecat Thee GrooveRetro Radio Mix) – 3:51
4. "Playgirl" (Simian Playboy Mix) – 2:40
5. "Playgirl" (I Monster Northern Lights Mix) – 6:06
6. "Playgirl" (Tobias Neumann Mix) – 3:57
7. "Playgirl" (Felix Da Housecat Glitz Clubhead Mix) – 6:35
8. "Playgirl" (King of Woolworths Coming Down Mix) – 7:50
9. "Playgirl" (Howie Ross Mix) – 4:46
10. "Playgirl" (Tobias Neumann Club Mix) – 3:54

=== Promo Maxi CD, Germany (2001) ===
Playgirl & Remixes

1. "Playgirl" (Glove Radio Mix) – 3:56
2. "Playgirl" (Thee Original Grooveretro Edit) – 3:51
3. "Playgirl" (Playboy Mix) – 2:40
4. "Playgirl" (Original) – 3:51

=== 12", Germany (2001) ===
Playgirl (Remixes)

1. "Playgirl" (Felix Da Housecat Glitz Clubhead Mix) – 6:34
2. "Playgirl" (Playgirl (Glove Megamix) – 8:51
3. "Playgirl" (Zombie Nation Mix) – 5:45

=== 12", UK (2001) ===
1. "Playgirl" (Zombie Nation Mix)
2. "Playgirl" (Felix Da Housecat Glitz Clubhead Mix)
3. "Playgirl" (I Monster Northern Lights Mix)

=== CD single, US (2001) ===
1. "Playgirl" (Tobias Neumann Mix) – 3:56
2. "Playgirl" (Zombie Nation Mix) – 5:45
3. "Playgirl" (Simian Playboy Mix) – 2:38
4. "Playgirl" (Felix Da Housecat Glitz Clubhead Mix) – 6:37
5. "Playgirl" (I Monster Mix) – 6:04
6. "Playgirl" (Tobias Neumann Club Mix) – 3:53

=== CD single, Germany (2001) ===
1. "Playgirl" – 3:50
2. "Miss Black" – 1:53
3. "Playgirl" (Snap Ant Version) – 6:13

=== CD 1 single, UK (2001) ===
1. "Playgirl" (Original 604 Version) – 3:49
2. "Playgirl" (King of Woolworths Coming Down) – 7:48
3. "Playgirl" (I Monster Northern Lites Mix) – 6:05

=== CD 2 single, UK (2001) ===
1. "Playgirl" (Felix Thee Grooveretro Radio Mix) – 3:51
2. "Playgirl" (Zombie Nation Mix) – 5:46
3. "Playgirl" (Simian Playboy Mix) – 2:38

=== Promo CD single, Germany (2001) ===
1. "Playgirl"

== Music video ==
There are 3 versions of "Playgirl" music video, one of them for "Playgirl" (Glove Remix)".
