= Cristina (singer) =

American singer (1959–2020)

- Cristina in 1978

Background information
- Also known as: Cristina Monet Zilkha
- Born: Cristina Monet-Palaci; January 17, 1959; New York City, U.S.
- Died: April 1, 2020 (aged 61) New York City, U.S.
- Genres: No wave; synth-pop; disco; dance-pop; new wave
- Occupation: Singer
- Instrument: Vocals
- Years active: 1978–1984
- Labels: ZE; Mercury

Cristina Monet Zilkha (née Monet-Palaci, January 17, 1959 – April 1, 2020), known during her recording career simply as Cristina, was an American singer and writer, best known for her no wave recordings made for ZE Records in the late 1970s and early 1980s in New York City. Matthew Perpetua wrote that she "was a pioneer in blending the artsiness and attitude of punk with the joyful energy of disco and pop.... [which] helped pave the way for the massive successes of her contemporaries, like Madonna and Cyndi Lauper, and anticipated the rise of confrontational but danceable alt-pop acts..." While Andrew Unterberger said her Disco Clone recording was "campy, self-aware, and infectious."

== Early life ==
Cristina Monet Zilkha was born Cristina Monet-Palaci on January 17, 1956, in Manhattan to writer-illustrator Dorothy Monet and French psychoanalyst Jacques Palaci (1915-1995) (president of the National Psychological Association for Psychoanalysis, friend of Heinz Kohut, Austrian-born American psychoanalyst and author of Remembering Reik). She grew up in the United States, England, Italy, and France. Cristina studied drama at the Royal Central School of Speech and Drama and attended Harvard University. During a leave from Harvard, she was in a motorcycle accident in which a friend died, and she decided not to re-enroll.

== Career ==
Cristina was working as a writer for The Village Voice when she met Michael Zilkha, who later became her husband. A wealthy heir to England's Mothercare retail empire, Michael started ZE Records with Michel Esteban. Zilkha persuaded her to record a song titled "Disco Clone", an eccentric pastiche dance record written by Ronald Melrose, a classmate of hers at Harvard. The original recording, released as ZE001 in 1978, was produced by John Cale and was the first to be issued on the ZE label. A later version featured the uncredited Kevin Kline trying to seduce Cristina, replacing Anthony Haden-Guest on the original record.

Though initially recorded as a tongue-in-cheek pastiche, "Disco Clone" was a cult success and encouraged ZE to release a full-length album in 1980, which was produced by August Darnell of Kid Creole & The Coconuts, and including songs written by Cristina. The album, originally titled 'Cristina' was reissued as Doll in the Box. Cristina also issued on a 12" single a cover of Peggy Lee's "Is That All There Is?" with new, satirical lyrics. Its authors Leiber and Stoller sued and successfully got it withdrawn for many years. Later, she released a cover of the Beatles' "Drive My Car" (also released as "Baby You Can Drive My Car"). She released the track "Things Fall Apart", produced by Was (Not Was), on ZE's Christmas Record, in 1981.

Cristina's second album Sleep It Off, on which she retained her sardonic tone, was produced by Don Was and released in 1984 with a sleeve design by Jean-Paul Goude (a year before he used the same idea for Grace Jones). The lyrics, many written by Cristina, satirized urban decadence with often dry, sarcastic delivery. The record flopped, and Cristina retired to domestic life with her husband in Texas. The song "What's a Girl to Do?" from this album was included in the Ladytron compilation Softcore Jukebox in 2003, and has been claimed by critic Richie Unterberger as "arguably her signature track". The album was re-released in 2004 with six bonus tracks, two of which were produced (and one co-written) by Robert Palmer. In 2005, she collaborated with New York musician Alex Gimeno aka Ursula 10000 on the track "Urgent/Anxious" off his Here Comes Tomorrow album.

She later contributed learned essays and reviews to publications such as London's Times Literary Supplement while battling autoimmune disorders, including relapsing polychondritis. Her two albums for ZE were reissued in 2004, after Michael Esteban revived the label.

== Personal life and death ==
Cristina Monet Palaci married entrepreneur Michael Zilkha. They divorced in 1990, and she returned to New York City.

Cristina had had several autoimmune disorders, including relapsing polychondritis for almost two decades.

On April 1, 2020, Cristina died in New York at the age of 61 after testing positive for COVID-19.

== Legacy ==
In 2020, critic Richie Unterberger at Billboard summarized her career as follows:

While Cristina never achieved mainstream success, her wry songwriting, deadpan delivery and infectious beats proved roundly ahead of their time, a touchstone for the electroclash movement of the early '00s, and a precedent for later post-modern pop superstars like Lady Gaga and Lana Del Rey.

Singer-songwriter Zola Jesus wrote: "Cristina was a HUGE inspiration to me... I loved how she was too weird for the pop world and too pop for the weird world."

== Discography ==
Cristina discography
- Studio albums: 2
- Singles: 6

=== Studio albums ===
- Cristina (1980, ZE Records)
- Sleep It Off (1984, Mercury Records)
- Doll in the Box (2004, ZE Records) – Expanded re-issue of Cristina

=== Singles ===
- "Disco Clone" (1978)
- "Is That All There Is?" (1980)
- "Drive My Car" (also released as "Baby You Can Drive My Car") (1980)
- "La Poupée qui fait non" (1980)
- "Things Fall Apart" (1981)
- "Ticket to the Tropics" (1984)
