= Destroy Everything You Touch =

Single by Ladytron

from the album Witching Hour
- B-side: "Citadel"; "Seventeen '05"; "Nothing to Hide"; "Soft Power" (remix); "International Date Line"; Remixes
- Released: 19 September 2005
- Recorded: 2004–2005
- Studio: Elevator, Liverpool; Sahara Sound, London
- Genre: Electropop; electroclash; alternative dance; disco; indietronica; synth-pop
- Length: 4:36 (album version); 3:52 (radio edit)
- Label: Island
- Composers: Mira Aroyo; Daniel Hunt; Helen Marnie; Reuben Wu
- Lyricist: Daniel Hunt
- Producers: Jim Abbiss; Ladytron

Ladytron singles chronology
"Sugar" (2005)	"Destroy Everything You Touch" (2005)	"Ghosts" (2008)

Music video
- "Destroy Everything You Touch" on YouTube

"Destroy Everything You Touch" is a song by British electronic music band Ladytron. It was released in 2005 as the second single from their third studio album, Witching Hour. It reached a position of number 42 on the UK Singles Chart, the highest position a Ladytron single has reached to date. It was re-released in the UK on 22 October 2007. The song ranked at #137 on Pitchfork's "The Top 500 Tracks of the 2000s" list.

== Music video ==
The music video, directed by Adam Bartley, shows the members of Ladytron hiking through a mountain range, facing various hazards such as two-legged creatures attempting to attack them, and having frosty wind blown at them by faces in the mountains (which are the members of Ladytron, with makeup added to them to make their skin look covered with snow and ice).

== Remixes ==
The single has been remixed by Sasha for his mix/remix album Invol2ver. On 19 May 2009, a cover version by The Faint was released on an iTunes single titled "The Faint/Ladytron Tour – Single" (with Ladytron contributing a remix of The Faint's "Mirror Error").

== Track listings ==
CD single, UK (2005)

1. "Destroy Everything You Touch" (single version) – 3:52
2. "Seventeen '05" – 7:18

7" limited edition, UK (2005)

1. "Destroy Everything You Touch" – 4:21
2. "Citadel" – 3:40

Maxi CD enhanced, UK (2005)

1. "Destroy Everything You Touch" (single version) – 3:52
2. "Nothing to Hide" – 3:49
3. "Destroy Everything You Touch" (Playgroup Vocal Edit) – 5:25
4. "Destroy Everything You Touch" (Hot Chip Remix Edit) – 6:50
5. "Destroy Everything You Touch" (music video)

7", 1/2, UK (2007)

1. "Destroy Everything You Touch" (radio edit)
2. "Destroy Everything You Touch" (Hot Chip Remix)

7", 2/2, UK (2007)

1. "Destroy Everything You Touch" (radio edit)
2. "Soft Power" (Vicarious Bliss Gutter Mix)

Maxi CD, Germany (2007)

1. "Destroy Everything You Touch" (single version) – 3:52
2. "Destroy Everything You Touch" (Playgroup Version) – 7:47
3. "Destroy Everything You Touch" (Hot Chip Remix) – 7:12
4. "Destroy Everything You Touch" (Vector Lovers Remix) – 7:56

Maxi CD, UK (2007)

1. "Destroy Everything You Touch" (radio edit) – 3:50
2. "International Dateline" (Simian Mobile Disco Remix) – 5:18
3. "International Dateline" – 4:16
4. "Destroy Everything You Touch" (White Heat On the Money Edit) – 4:18

12", UK

1. "Destroy Everything You Touch" (Sasha Invol2ver Remix)
