= Redbird Records =

Independent record label

Redbird Records is an independent record label founded by the pop punk band Ludo.
In October 2006, Ludo signed a five-album deal with Island Records that turned Redbird Records into an Island Records imprint. Under the deal, the band may release noncommercial material such as Christmas albums or rock operas on the Redbird imprint.

Bands associated with Redbird Records include Ludo, Tommy & The High Pilots, The New Heathers and Without A Face.

== See also ==
- List of record labels
