= Super Numeri =

- Origin: Liverpool, England
- Genres: Avant-garde, instrumental, psychedelic
- Years active: 2002–2005
- Label: Ninja Tune
- Past members: Pop Levi (Jonathan Levi); Snap Ant (James Morgan); Karl Webb

Super Numeri were an English instrumental avant-garde group based in Liverpool and signed to the Ninja Tune label in 2002.

The band was formed by Pop Levi (Jonathan Levi), Snap Ant (James Morgan) and Karl Webb and was based at Adlington House in Aigburth, Liverpool. The trio also recruited a revolving cast of other musicians for recordings and live performances including drummers Tilo Pirnbaum, Adam Skinner and Marius Simonsen, guitarists Andy Pinchin and Ranjit Burman, percussionist Chris Preston, harpist Stan Ambrose and violin players Tristan Bryant, Amy Lammin and John Dickinson. The band recorded two albums and were compared with German group Can and Jah Wobble. Levi's regular touring and recording work with Ladytron effectively ended the band, and both Levi and Morgan both went on to release solo singles on "Invicta Hi-Fi", an independent label set up by Daniel Hunt of Ladytron. Levi then went on to re-sign with Ninja Tune on the specially created imprint Counter Records.

== Discography ==
Albums

- Great Aviaries CD/LP (2003, Ninja Tune)
- The Welcome Table CD/LP (2005, Ninja Tune)

Singles

- The Electric Horse Garden 7" (2002, Ninja Tune)
- The Coastal Bird Scene 12" (2003, Ninja Tune)

Curated album

- The Enochian Way CD (JP) (2005, Counter Records)
