= So Sad (disambiguation) =

So Sad may refer to:

== Music ==
- "So Sad" by George Harrison, 1973
- "So Sad" (Gregorian song), 1991
- "So Sad (Fade)" by Love Amongst Ruin, 2010
- "So Sad (No Love of His Own)", an alternate title for the Harrison song, recorded by Alvin Lee and Mylon LeFevre for the album On the Road to Freedom
- "So Sad (To Watch Good Love Go Bad)" by the Everly Brothers, 1960
- So Sad, a 2001 EP by Vincent Gallo
