= Sexy Sadie =

1968 song by the Beatles

- Cover of the song's sheet music

Song by the Beatles

from the album The Beatles
- Published: Northern Songs
- Released: 22 November 1968
- Recorded: 19 and 24 July, 13 and 21 August 1968
- Studio: EMI, London
- Genre: Psychedelic rock
- Length: 3:15
- Label: Apple
- Songwriter: Lennon–McCartney
- Producer: George Martin

"Sexy Sadie" is a song by the English rock group the Beatles from their 1968 double album The Beatles (also known as "the White Album"). The song was written by John Lennon in India and credited to Lennon–McCartney. Lennon wrote the song during the Beatles' stay in India in response to the Maharishi Mahesh Yogi's alleged sexual advance on actress Mia Farrow. The song has been considered an early example of a diss track.

== Composition ==
Lennon originally wanted to title the song "Maharishi", but changed the title to "Sexy Sadie" at George Harrison's request. Lennon was disillusioned after Maharishi Mahesh Yogi had allegedly made a sexual advance on Mia Farrow, who was attending a course the Maharishi was teaching at his ashram in Rishikesh, India.

Lennon once said of the song: "That was inspired by Maharishi. I wrote it when we had our bags packed and were leaving. It was the last piece I wrote before I left India. I just called him 'Sexy Sadie' instead of (sings) 'Maharishi what have you done, you made a fool...' I was just using the situation to write a song, rather calculatingly but also to express what I felt. I was leaving the Maharishi with a bad taste. You know, it seems that my partings are always not as nice as I'd like them to be." He told Rolling Stone that when the Maharishi asked why he was leaving, he replied, "Well, if you're so cosmic, you'll know why."

After returning from India, Lennon scratched the lyrics into a piece of wood, with the original title "Maharishi". According to Harrison's account in the director's cut of the Beatles Anthology (1995) documentary, the recorded version changed only after Harrison insisted that if the song was used its name must be changed and persuaded Lennon to retitle it "Sexy Sadie". Derek Taylor remembered Lennon's scratching the wood in the Apple offices.

According to Mark Lewisohn's The Complete Beatles Recording Sessions (1988), an early outtake of "Sexy Sadie" features Lennon demonstrating the song's original working lyrics to the rest of the band: "Maharishi, you little twat/Who the fuck do you think you are?/Who the fuck do you think you are?/Oh, you cunt."

The song's instrumental fadeout was originally 39 seconds longer and featured a breakdown based around the middle eight. This was edited out before mixing.

In a 1968 Rolling Stone interview, Lennon compared the song to "I've Been Good to You" by Smokey Robinson and the Miracles. The Miracles song begins with the lines "Look what you've done/You made a fool out of someone", echoing "Sexy Sadie"'s "What have you done?/You made a fool of everyone".

== Evidence Contradicting Lennon’s Accusations ==
George Harrison, Paul McCartney, and Cynthia Lennon later said that they thought the story, which had come from Alexis Mardas, also known as "Magic Alex", had been fabricated and Mia Farrow, in her own autobiography, gives a detailed explanation of what really happened with the Maharishi :

We settled ourselves in the lotus position to meditate. After twenty or so minutes, we were getting on our feet, still facing each other, but as I'm usually a little disoriented after meditation, I was blinking at his beard when suddenly I became aware of two surprisingly male, hairy arms going around me. I panicked, and shot up the stairs apologising all the way. I flew out into the open air, and ran as fast as I could to Prudy's room, where she was meditating of course. I blurted out something about Maharishi's cave, and arms, and beard, and she said, "It's an honor to be touched by a holy man after meditation, a tradition." Furthermore, at my level of consciousness, if Jesus Christ Himself had embraced me, I would have misinterpreted it.

Harrison also commented, "Now, historically, there's the story that something went on that shouldn't have done – but nothing did." In 1992, Harrison gave a benefit concert for the Maharishi-associated Natural Law Party, and later apologised for the way the Maharishi had been treated by saying, "We were very young" and "It's probably in the history books that Maharishi 'tried to attack Mia Farrow' – but it's bullshit, total bullshit." Cynthia Lennon wrote in 2006 that she "hated leaving on a note of discord and mistrust, when we had enjoyed so much kindness from the Maharishi". Asked if he forgave the Beatles, the Maharishi replied, "I could never be upset with angels." McCartney took his daughter, Stella, to visit the Maharishi in the Netherlands in 2007, which renewed their friendship.

== Legacy ==
Coinciding with the 50th anniversary of the release of The Beatles, Jacob Stolworthy of The Independent listed "Sexy Sadie" at number six in his ranking of the album's 30 tracks. He wrote of the song: "To this day 'Sexy Sadie' drips with bittersweet disdain, its moody final minute—inspiring Radiohead's 'Karma Police' and 'Four Out of Five' by Arctic Monkeys—managing to spring hairs on end, however many times you've heard it." Also in 2018, Time Out London ranked "Sexy Sadie" at number 14 on its list of the best Beatles songs.

== Personnel ==
- John Lennon – lead and backing vocals, rhythm guitar
- Paul McCartney – backing vocals, bass guitar, Hammond organ, piano, guitar
- George Harrison – backing vocals, lead guitar, tambourine
- Ringo Starr – drums

== Influence ==
- Ringo Starr referenced the song in the lyrics of both "Devil Woman" (from 1973's Ringo) and "Drumming Is My Madness" (from 1981's Stop and Smell the Roses).
- George Harrison also referenced the song in "Simply Shady", from his 1974 album Dark Horse.
- The song inspired one of the characters' names in the 2007 Beatles-themed film Across the Universe, Sadie (played by Dana Fuchs).
- The band Sexy Sadie took their name from this song.
- The main piano riff in the Radiohead song "Karma Police" resembles the piano part in this song.

== Cover versions ==
When Mojo released The White Album Recovered in 2008, part of a continuing series of CDs of Beatles albums covered track-by-track by modern artists, the track was covered by Rachel Unthank and the Winterset. The disc also featured a bonus track of the same song performed by Paul Weller.

The song was also covered by Anderson .Paak on multi-instrumentalist and producer Kush Mody's first album Creature Comforts (2014).
