= Sexy Sadie (band) =

Spanish pop rock group

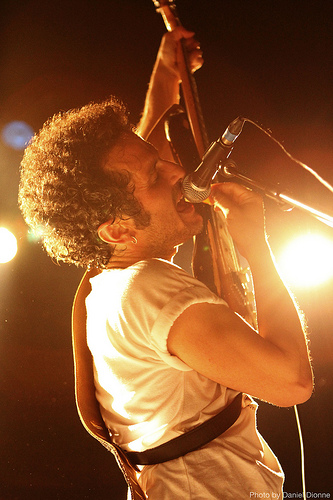
- Jaime García Soriano, from the Sexy Sadies, at a concert in Sala Caracol in Madrid, 2011.

Background information
- Origin: Mallorca, Balearic Islands, Spain
- Genre: Pop rock
- Years active: 1992–2006

Sexy Sadie (formerly L.A.) was a Spanish pop rock group from the island of Mallorca. The group, which sang in English, released five full albums, plus one album of cover songs, one of rare tracks, and one of remixes.

Sexy Sadie formed in 1992, as part of a wave of independent groups that arose in the early 1990s, along with Los Planetas and Manta Ray. Their recording career was always related with Subterfuge Records. The band's name was inspired by The Beatles' song Sexy Sadie, from their 1968 album The Beatles. The group broke up in 2006.

== Members ==
- Miki Serra (1992–1997) (guitars, vocals)
- Jaime García Soriano (1992–2006) (guitars, vocals)
- Toni Toledo (1992–2006) (drums)
- José Luis Sampol - (1992–2000) (bass, vocals)
- Pablo García Soriano (verano 1999) (guitars)
- Miquel Martínez "Pinti" (1998–1999) (guitars)
- Carlos Pilán (1999–2006) (guitars)
- Jaume Gost (2000–2006) (bass)
- Michael Mesquida (2006–2006) (guitars)
- Sergio Molina (2006–2006) (keys)

== Discography ==
- Draining Your Brain (1994)
- Onion Soup (1996)
- Onion Soup triturated by Big Toxic (1997)
- Stay behind me (1998)
- It's Beautiful, It's Love (1998)
- Butterflies (2000)
- Odd Tracks Out! (2000)
- I don't know (2000)
- Subsonic(2001)
- Dream Covers (2002)
- Lost & Found (2003)
- What Have You Done? - 10 Years of Singles (2004)
- 27-03-04 (2004)
- Translate (2006)
