= Simply Shady =

Song by George Harrison

from the album Dark Horse
- Released: 9 December 1974
- Genre: Country rock
- Length: 4:38
- Label: Apple
- Songwriter: George Harrison
- Producer: George Harrison

"Simply Shady" is a song by English musician George Harrison that was released on his 1974 album Dark Horse. The song addresses Harrison's wayward behaviour during the final year of his marriage to Pattie Boyd, particularly the allure of temptations such as alcohol and drugs over spiritual goals. Harrison said the song was about "what happens to naughty boys in the music business".

Harrison wrote "Simply Shady" in Bombay in early 1974 during his first visit to India since 1968, when he and his Beatles bandmates had studied Transcendental Meditation at Rishikesh. In his lyrics, he reflects on the karmic consequences of his lifestyle in England and references John Lennon's "Sexy Sadie", a song inspired by the Beatles' time in Rishikesh. Harrison recorded the track at an impromptu session held at his Friar Park home studio with the L.A. Express, who were touring Britain as Joni Mitchell's backing band at the time. Two of the musicians, Tom Scott and Robben Ford, subsequently played with Harrison on his 1974 North American tour with Ravi Shankar.

Harrison's vocals on the track were marred by his contracting laryngitis towards the end of the sessions for Dark Horse – a result of his having overextended himself on business and musical commitments, as well as his punishing lifestyle. Partly due to Harrison's hoarse singing, "Simply Shady" has been viewed in an unfavourable light by many music critics and reviewers. Other commentators consider its confessional tone to be significant in Harrison's career, representing a departure from the spiritual certainties that typically defined his work following the Beatles.

== Background and inspiration ==
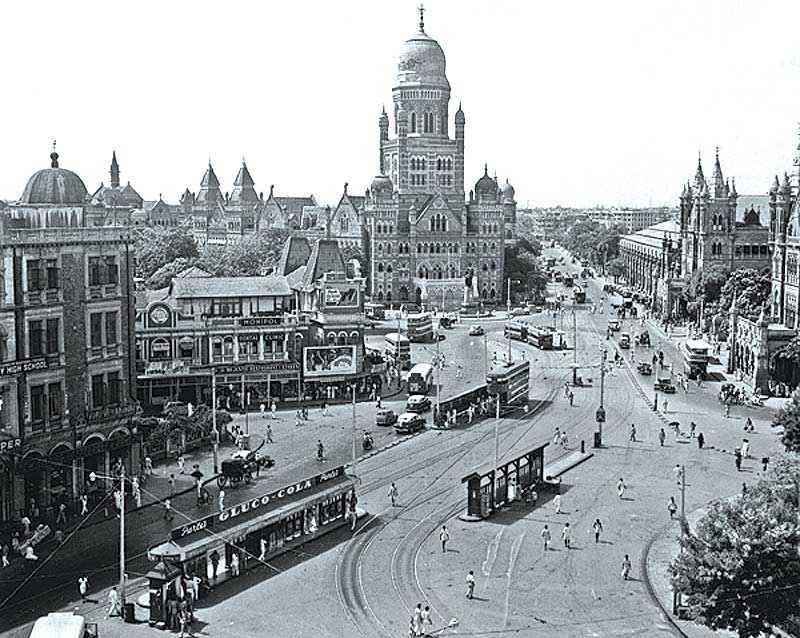
Bombay's Victoria Terminus (pictured in the 1950s). During his stay in Bombay in 1974, Harrison drew inspiration from his troubled personal life when writing "Simply Shady".

According to George Harrison's recollection in his autobiography, I, Me, Mine, the visit he made to India in 1974 was his first since 1968, when the Beatles had studied Transcendental Meditation at Maharishi Mahesh Yogi's ashram in Rishikesh. The main purpose of the 1974 trip was to attend a Vedic ceremony in honour of Ravi Shankar's new home in Benares and to film the event. Accompanied by his friend and fellow musician Gary Wright, Harrison first went to Calcutta in early January before travelling to Benares; there, he and Shankar formulated the concept for Ravi Shankar's Music Festival from India and an ensuing joint tour of North America at the end of the year. Harrison and Shankar then travelled to the Hindu holy city of Vrindavan, where Harrison was inspired to write the devotional song "It Is 'He' (Jai Sri Krishna)". Later in the trip, while in Bombay, he wrote another new composition, "Simply Shady".

I went on a bit of a bender to make up for all the years I'd been married. If you listen to "Simply Shady", on Dark Horse, it's all in there – my whole life at that time was a bit like Mrs. Dale's Diary.

– George Harrison to Rolling Stone, 1979

In a 1994 interview held at Shankar's home in California, Harrison spoke of the reluctance he used to feel before visiting India or meeting with friends such as A.C. Bhaktivedanta Swami Prabhupada of the Hare Krishna movement, due to the "craziness" taking place in his life as a rock musician. Written during a period when his marriage to Pattie Boyd was ending, "Simply Shady" was inspired by the decadent lifestyle that Harrison had been leading at his Friar Park home in England. Over this period, he had immersed himself in his work, while returning to the worldly ways he had mostly abandoned in 1967, following his embrace of Indian philosophy, particularly meditation. Boyd has written of their overindulgence with drugs and alcohol over 1973–74 and highlighted Harrison's excessive use of cocaine, about which she says: "I think it changed him ... it froze George's emotions and hardened his heart." In I, Me, Mine, Harrison describes the song as being "about what happens to naughty boys in the music business". While recognising a disparity between its subject matter and his surroundings at the time, he says he most likely came up with the theme before leaving for India.

== Composition ==
"Simply Shady" is in 4/4 time and its musical key is C minor. The song comprises three combinations of verse and chorus, followed by repeated choruses. Author Simon Leng defines its musical style as country rock.

The lyrics to the song serve as a confession in which Harrison details how he has lost his way. Author Ian Inglis describes "Simply Shady" as an autobiographical account of a musician "who succumbs to the temptations of 'sex and drugs and rock 'n' roll' that are stereotypically linked with the mythology of rock". Leng likens the track to contemporary work by Neil Young, particularly "Yonder Stands the Sinner", adding that Harrison arrives at "the same impasse" as the Canadian singer: "decadence, dependency, and despair".

In the opening verse, Harrison acknowledges the changes brought about by his overindulgence with drugs and alcohol. He recalls partaking from "the juicer", after which his "senses took a dip" and he became "blinded by desire". During the second verse, he likens his increased cravings to a form of madness. In the lyrics to the chorus, he recognises the futility of this behaviour, knowing that, just as "it's all been done before", it provides nothing beyond relief in the short term.

Harrison measures the consequences of his actions in terms of their karmic effect, a preoccupation he had first embraced in his songwriting over 1966–67 with songs such as "Art of Dying". In the third verse, he acknowledges that all thoughts and deeds affect the world, since "A pebble in the ocean must cause some kind of stir". (Note: The same concept was central to the teachings of Maharishi Mahesh Yogi. On one of his 1967 spoken-word recordings, he stated: "If we drop a stone in a pond, the ripples begin to move over the whole pond, reaching all the extremities.") Recognising his culpability, Harrison concludes: "The action that I've started sometime I'll have to face / My influence in motion rebounding back through space." In their respective commentaries on "Simply Shady", Christian theologian Dale Allison cites Harrison's indictment of his behaviour in the context of karmic retribution as evidence of the composition offering "religious interest", while Inglis highlights an important contrast between Harrison's lack of moralising in the song relative to the sermonising quality of his 1973 album Living in the Material World. (Note: In Inglis' opinion, Harrison's confessional approach is "significant", since "here he is making no pretence of having moved on to a superior spiritual or moral plane.")

The song's final choruses include the line "You may think of Sexy Sadie, let her in through your front door", reprising the late-period Beatles device of self-reference. In this case, Harrison name-checks "Sexy Sadie", John Lennon's thinly veiled attack on the Maharishi and the latter's alleged sexual advances towards one of the female students at the Rishikesh retreat. (Note: Lennon first quoted from the Beatles' past work in 1967 with "I Am the Walrus", as a means of teasing listeners who searched for hidden meaning in their lyrics. Later examples include "Glass Onion" and Harrison's "Savoy Truffle", both of which, like "Sexy Sadie", appeared on the band's self-titled double album in 1968.) Inglis views this mention in "Simply Shady" as significant on three levels: Harrison is alluding to a casual sexual partner in the present; recalling his former mentor and guru, the Maharishi; and supplying "a coded reference" to his past as a Beatle.

== Production ==
=== Initial recording ===
There was a bad domestic year, 1974 ..."Simply Shady", that song is about it. At the same time I was doing a Splinter album and a Ravi Shankar album and my own album ... [I]n the end Denis O'Brien carried me out of the studio to my first concert (in Canada) ...

– George Harrison in I, Me, Mine

Harrison returned to England in March 1974 and recorded "Simply Shady" the following month for his new album, Dark Horse. Unlike his two previous studio albums, All Things Must Pass and Material World, Harrison worked on Dark Horse in stages, over a year-long period. During this time, he focused instead on projects such as setting up Dark Horse Records and producing albums by the record label's first two signings: Shankar's Shankar Family & Friends, and The Place I Love by the group Splinter. (Note: Harrison later described the schedule he had set himself in 1974 as "ridiculous". In the lead-up to his and Shankar's North American tour, his workload also included producing the Apple feature film Little Malcolm, and recording a second Shankar album for Dark Horse Records, with the Music Festival from India orchestra. In addition, Harrison organised the Music Festival's European tour over September–October 1974.) Leng cites the recording of "Simply Shady" – an impromptu session with the L.A. Express, who were touring the UK as Joni Mitchell's backing group – as an example of the unpredictable approach that Harrison adopted when making Dark Horse.

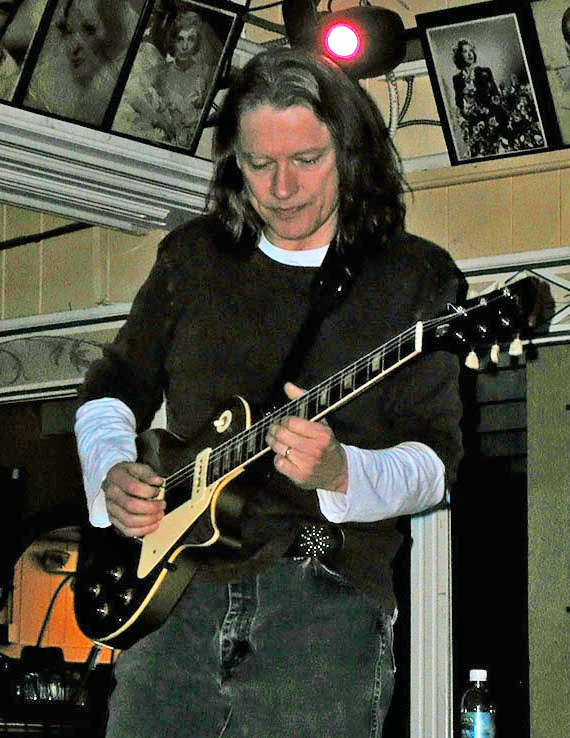
Robben Ford (pictured in 2007) played lead guitar on the track, with Harrison, and subsequently joined his tour band for the North American tour with Ravi Shankar.

Harrison had collaborated with Tom Scott, the leader and saxophonist of the L.A. Express, during the Shankar Family & Friends sessions in Los Angeles in 1973. After attending Mitchell's show at the New Victoria Theatre in London, he invited the band to record at his home studio, FPSHOT, the following day. Lead guitarist Robben Ford recalls that on arrival at Friar Park, at 1 pm, the musicians were entertained by Boyd until Harrison woke up, at which point the couple "didn't interact and she just disappeared". The recording session began at 1 am. "Hari's on Tour (Express)" – an instrumental that Harrison used as the opening song of both Dark Horse and his live shows with Shankar – was recorded on the same day. The recording engineer at the session was Phil McDonald.

Leng describes "Simply Shady" as a "stark-sounding cut" due to the unpolished production. The track has a blues-based arrangement, for which Ford and Roger Kellaway supplied the main instrumental fills, on guitar and piano, respectively. Bassist Max Bennett recalled that he enjoyed the visit, which included a tour of Harrison's Friar Park estate, but did not feel they had "accomplished much musically". The band then went back to London to continue their tour with Mitchell in support of her album Court and Spark.

=== Overdubbing ===
Scott returned to Friar Park to work further with Harrison in August, by which time Boyd had left him for his friend Eric Clapton. Scott overdubbed a variety of horn parts on "Simply Shady", while Harrison played the closing guitar solo – a part that Inglis views as "straining" and in keeping with the song's "emotional plea". Both Scott and Ford later played in Harrison's tour band.

Described by author Robert Rodriguez as "a Tom Waits croak", Harrison's singing on "Simply Shady" was affected by laryngitis, like many of the tracks on Dark Horse. He contracted this affliction through a combination of overwork and drug and alcohol abuse. The vocal parts were overdubbed either at FPSHOT or at A&M Studios, Los Angeles, late in October 1974, during the rush to complete the album while simultaneously rehearsing for the North American tour.

In his pre-tour press conference on 23 October, Harrison fended off questions about his personal life. He cited "Simply Shady" and "So Sad" as examples of how his forthcoming album was like the television soap opera Peyton Place and would reveal "exactly what I've been doing". (Note: By late 1974, rumours circulated regarding Harrison's affair with Maureen Starkey, the wife of his former Beatles bandmate Ringo Starr. The press had also reported on Harrison's involvement with Kathy Simmons, a British model and actress.) He also acknowledged that it was "difficult" to maintain his spirituality as a rock musician and concluded by reaffirming his support for the Maharishi.

== Release and contemporary reception ==
Apple Records issued Dark Horse on 9 December 1974 in North America, over halfway through the tour, and on 20 December in Britain. "Simply Shady" was sequenced as the album's second track, following "Hari's on Tour (Express)", and preceding two other songs concerning Harrison's domestic problems, "So Sad" and "Bye Bye, Love". Reflecting the contrast between the songs on side one of the LP and the more optimistic themes on side two, the record's face labels included a photo of Harrison on the first side and one of his new girlfriend, Olivia Arias, who worked at Dark Horse Records' Los Angeles office, on the reverse.

The majority of reviews for Dark Horse were unfavourable and, in Leng's description, "Simply Shady" was "much maligned". Recalling the release in 2001, Record Collector editor Peter Doggett paired the song with "Dark Horse" as the two tracks that most alienated Harrison's fans due to the ravaged quality of his singing. (Note: Further to Harrison's later comment that his "binge" over this period "got to the point where I had no voice and almost no body at times", Doggett has identified "Simply Shady" as the song that served as "the clearest portrait of an artist in distress".) In addition, as a chronicle of its author's self-degradation, "Simply Shady" marked a departure from the standard subject matter of Harrison's solo work. According to Leng, the song "shatter[ed] the 'Beatle George' image" and so proved unwelcome amid the high expectations surrounding the concurrent tour, which was the first in North America by a former Beatle since the band's 1966 tour.

In Rolling Stone's highly unfavourable critique of Dark Horse, Jim Miller condemned Harrison for showing disdain towards the Beatles' legacy during the tour and then releasing an album on which his voice was blown. Writing in Circus Raves, Michael Gross defended Harrison's new direction and highlighted the reference to "Sexy Sadie" as the artist "look[ing] askance" at his past.

In the NME, Bob Woffinden denigrated "Simply Shady" as "[evincing] all the faults that clog the album". Woffinden continued: "George's vocals are tiresome, his voice, nasal and toneless, seems to be slowing down the song; the lyrics are straightforward and dull. Also the familiar cloying punches that Harrison's own production pulls are evident. Nothing ever happens – the sound is dense, viscid ..." (Note: Writing in 1981, Woffinden viewed Dark Horse in a more positive light. While admiring the production and the guitar playing throughout the album, he grouped "Simply Shady" with "Dark Horse" and "Far East Man" as three tracks that would have been "really good – had they been graced with good vocals, and had they appeared in a different context".) In an otherwise favourable review, Brian Harrigan of Melody Maker praised the musicianship of Harrison and the L.A. Express, and Harrison's singing on the album, but said that the song "really drags on".

== Retrospective assessment and legacy ==
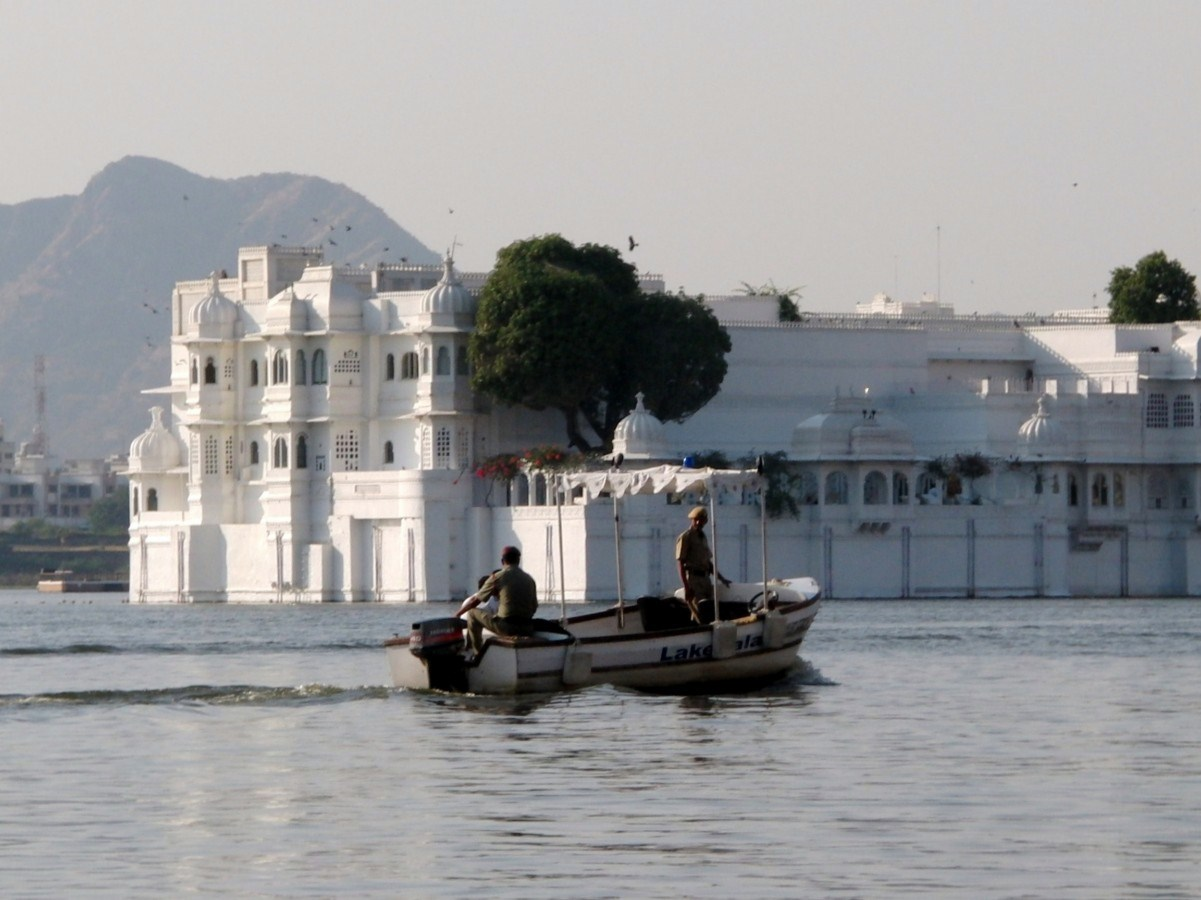
The Lake Palace hotel in Udaipur. According to Olivia Harrison (née Arias), a tape exists of Harrison recording a demo of "Simply Shady" there in 1974.

In a 1979 interview with Rolling Stone, Harrison cited "Simply Shady" as the song that best summed up a fallow period in his personal life that ended when he found lasting happiness with Arias. Arias has commented on the surprising background to the song, saying, "He's in India, a very spiritual place, writing about a very material experience", adding that a tape has been discovered of Harrison working on the composition while at the Lake Palace hotel in Udaipur. She told Mojo of this period in Harrison's career: "Everything in his life had changed at that point: getting divorced, Apple was in turmoil, he had his own personal demons. '74 was one of those breaking-through-the-sound-barrier periods. You come through and it's just quiet on the other side."

Among Beatles biographers, Chip Madinger and Mark Easter write that, as the first vocal track on Dark Horse, "Simply Shady" "bring[s] the LP to a screeching halt", and they describe it as "Somnambulistic in tone and tempo". Elliot Huntley offers a positive view, enjoying the song's "pleasant melody" and its "continuation of the West Coast feel that commenced the album". Alan Clayson considers that "Simply Shady" would have benefited from a sparser musical arrangement, (Note: Clayson cites the inclusion of "what Frank Zappa might call 'redundant piano triplets'".) but he recognises an element of intrigue in Dark Horse, with Harrison revealed as "an ex-Beatle in uncertain transition".

New Zealand Herald journalist Graham Reid similarly deems the track to be "More interesting than exceptional", as an account of how Harrison "soaked himself in booze and whatever" in reaction to the disintegration of his marriage. Among other recent reviews, Scott Elingburg of PopMatters considers Dark Horse to be an album on which "Harrison is playing music like he has nothing to lose and all the world to gain", and he cites "Simply Shady" as one of two tracks that "experiment subtly with tone, mood, and, most surprisingly, darkness". Writing in Classic Rock, Paul Trynka highlights the song among the "beautiful, small-scale moments" that were overlooked at the time of the album's release, describing it as "a shamefaced confessional on the banality of drunkenness".

Like Simon Leng, Robert Rodriguez identifies the subject matter as highly unusual among Harrison's work up to 1974, and he includes "Simply Shady" on his list of the artist's most underrated songs from the 1970s. While labelling the track a Lennon-style "self-flagellation", Rodriguez praises the musicianship on the recording and the musical arrangement, and considers that Harrison's "detached delivery proves to be just as chilling in its own way as [Lennon's] typical emotional approach was".

== Personnel ==
According to Simon Leng:

- George Harrison – vocals, electric guitars, backing vocals
- Tom Scott – saxophones, horn arrangement
- Robben Ford – electric guitar
- Roger Kellaway – piano, organ
- Max Bennett – bass
- John Guerin – drums

== Sources ==
- Dale C. Allison Jr., The Love There That's Sleeping: The Art and Spirituality of George Harrison, Continuum (New York, NY, 2006; ISBN 978-0-8264-1917-0).
- Keith Badman, The Beatles Diary Volume 2: After the Break-Up 1970–2001, Omnibus Press (London, 2001; ISBN 0-7119-8307-0).
- Pattie Boyd (with Penny Junor), Wonderful Today: The Autobiography, Headline Review (London, 2007; ISBN 978-0-7553-1646-5).
- Harry Castleman & Walter J. Podrazik, All Together Now: The First Complete Beatles Discography 1961–1975, Ballantine Books (New York, NY, 1976; ISBN 0-345-25680-8).
- Alan Clayson, George Harrison, Sanctuary (London, 2003; ISBN 1-86074-489-3).
- Peter Doggett, You Never Give Me Your Money: The Beatles After the Breakup, It Books (New York, NY, 2011; ISBN 978-0-06-177418-8).
- Walter Everett, The Beatles as Musicians: Revolver Through the Anthology, Oxford University Press (New York, NY, 1999; ISBN 0-19-509553-7).
- The Editors of Rolling Stone, Harrison, Rolling Stone Press/Simon & Schuster (New York, NY, 2002; ISBN 0-7432-3581-9).
- Joshua M. Greene, Here Comes the Sun: The Spiritual and Musical Journey of George Harrison, John Wiley & Sons (Hoboken, NJ, 2006; ISBN 978-0-470-12780-3).
- George Harrison, I Me Mine, Chronicle Books (San Francisco, CA, 2002; ISBN 0-8118-3793-9).
- Olivia Harrison, George Harrison: Living in the Material World, Abrams (New York, NY, 2011; ISBN 978-1-4197-0220-4).
- Bill Harry, The George Harrison Encyclopedia, Virgin Books (London, 2003; ISBN 978-0-7535-0822-0).
- Mark Hertsgaard, A Day in the Life: The Music and Artistry of the Beatles, Pan Books (London, 1996; ISBN 0-330-33891-9).
- Elliot J. Huntley, Mystical One: George Harrison – After the Break-up of the Beatles, Guernica Editions (Toronto, ON, 2006; ISBN 1-55071-197-0).
- Ian Inglis, The Words and Music of George Harrison, Praeger (Santa Barbara, CA, 2010; ISBN 978-0-313-37532-3).
- Peter Lavezzoli, The Dawn of Indian Music in the West, Continuum (New York, NY, 2006; ISBN 0-8264-2819-3).
- Simon Leng, While My Guitar Gently Weeps: The Music of George Harrison, Hal Leonard (Milwaukee, WI, 2006; ISBN 1-4234-0609-5).
- Mark Lewisohn, The Complete Beatles Recording Sessions, Hamlyn/EMI (London, 1988; ISBN 0-600-55798-7).
- Ian MacDonald, Revolution in the Head: The Beatles' Records and the Sixties, Pimlico (London, 1998; ISBN 0-7126-6697-4).
- Robert Rodriguez, Fab Four FAQ 2.0: The Beatles' Solo Years, 1970–1980, Backbeat Books (Milwaukee, WI, 2010; ISBN 978-1-4165-9093-4).
- Jeffrey Roessner, "We All Want to Change the World: Postmodern Politics and the Beatles' White Album", in Kenneth Womack & Todd Davis (eds), Reading the Beatles: Cultural Studies, Literary Criticism, and the Fab Four, SUNY Press (Albany, NY, 2006; ISBN 0-7914-8196-4).
- Nicholas Schaffner, The Beatles Forever, McGraw-Hill (New York, NY, 1978; ISBN 0-07-055087-5).
- Ravi Shankar, Raga Mala: The Autobiography of Ravi Shankar, Welcome Rain (New York, NY, 1999; ISBN 1-56649-104-5).
- Bruce Spizer, The Beatles Solo on Apple Records, 498 Productions (New Orleans, LA, 2005; ISBN 0-9662649-5-9).
- Gary Tillery, Working Class Mystic: A Spiritual Biography of George Harrison, Quest Books (Wheaton, IL, 2011; ISBN 978-0-8356-0900-5).
- Bob Woffinden, The Beatles Apart, Proteus (London, 1981; ISBN 0-906071-89-5).
- Gary Wright, Dream Weaver: A Memoir; Music, Meditation, and My Friendship with George Harrison, Tarcher/Penguin (New York, NY, 2014; ISBN 978-0-399-16523-8).
