= Māya Love =

- 1975 single B-side face label

Single by George Harrison

from the album Dark Horse
- A-side: "This Guitar (Can't Keep From Crying)"
- Released: 9 December 1974
- Studio: FPSHOT (Oxfordshire)
- Genre: Rock, funk
- Length: 4:24
- Label: Apple
- Songwriter(s): George Harrison
- Producer(s): George Harrison

"Māya Love" is a song by English musician George Harrison, released on his 1974 album Dark Horse. The song originated as a slide guitar tune, to which Harrison later added lyrics relating to the illusory nature of love – maya being a Sanskrit term for "illusion", or "that which is not". Harrison's biographers consider the lyrical theme to be reflective of his failed marriage to Pattie Boyd, who left him for his friend Eric Clapton shortly before the words were written.

Harrison recorded the song at his home, Friar Park, on the eve of his North American tour with Ravi Shankar, which took place in November and December 1974. The recording features Harrison's slide guitar extensively and contributions from four musicians who formed the nucleus of his tour band: Billy Preston, Tom Scott, Willie Weeks and Andy Newmark. Reviewers note the track as an example of its parent album's more diverse musical genres, namely funk and rhythm and blues, compared with the more traditional rock orientation of Harrison's earlier solo work.

Harrison played "Māya Love" throughout his 1974 tour, although no live recording has ever been officially released. The song later appeared as the B-side of Harrison's second single off his 1975 album Extra Texture, "This Guitar (Can't Keep from Crying)", which was the final release by Apple Records in its original incarnation.

== Background and composition ==
In his single sentence discussing "Māya Love" in I, Me, Mine, his 1980 autobiography, George Harrison states that he wrote the song "purely as a slide guitar tune with the words added later". His handwritten lyrics for the song include mention of open E tuning, Harrison's preferred alternative tuning and one he used for his other slide guitar compositions during the first half of the 1970s, such as "Woman Don't You Cry for Me", "Sue Me, Sue You Blues" and "Hari's on Tour (Express)". Simon Leng, Harrison's musical biographer, likens "Māya Love" to "Woman Don't You Cry for Me" and the 1987 song "Cloud 9", in that they all feature lyrics that were "appended out of necessity" rather than created through genuine inspiration.

In this case, the "perfunctory" lyrics consist of a series of comparisons between the illusory nature of love and that of all things in the material world, in line with the basic Hindu concept that everything in life is maya. Theologian Dale Allison writes that Harrison had "anticipated" such an interpretation of the world in his lyrics to the Beatles song "Within You, Without You" in 1967 – specifically when referring to people who "hide themselves behind a wall of illusion". The first explicit mention of maya in a Harrison composition appears in "Beware of Darkness", released on his 1970 triple album All Things Must Pass.

Harrison biographers such as Allison and Ian Inglis interpret his concept of maya love in this 1974 song as reflecting the failure of his marriage to Pattie Boyd, rather than a comment on love and human relationships in general. However, Eric Clapton has spoken of Harrison's view that relationships were, like possessions, all maya. (Note: According to Clapton's later recollection, when he confronted Harrison about his and Boyd's relationship, Harrison's reply was: "Whatever you like, man. It doesn't worry me. You can have her and I'll have your girlfriend.") During an interview with Houston radio station KLOL, shortly before the song's release in December that year, Harrison elaborated on the concept: "Maya love is something when it's 'I love you if', 'I love you when', 'I love you but'. It's a type of love that comes and goes which we do tend to give to one another ..."

In the first verse of "Māya Love", Harrison compares such "unreal" love to the flow of the ocean:

Māya love – māya love
Māya love is like the sea
Flowing in and out of me.

Subsequent verses equate illusory love with the passing of each day ("First it comes, then it rolls away"), the wind (which is "Blowing hard on everything") and rainfall (which Harrison describes as "Beating on your window brain"). Allison writes of these comparisons: "All this presumably stands in contrast to God's love, which doesn't come and go, which never gives way to night, and which heals rather than harms."

The final verse states: "Māya love is like a stream / Flowing through this cosmic dream." Allison views this analogy as a reference to all things in the material world being "nothing more than God's dream". The same life-as-a-dream metaphor appears in later Harrison compositions, Allison suggests, particularly "Unknown Delight", written about the birth of his and second wife Olivia Arias's son Dhani, and "Dream Away", Harrison's theme song for the HandMade movie Time Bandits (1981).

Musically the song combines Harrison's blues-based riffs with elements of funk, a genre that he was increasingly drawn towards during this period via his enduring passion for R&B and soul. Leng also observes that "Māya Love" is another instalment in its composer's "long line of three-syllable chants", following on from songs such as "My Sweet Lord" and "Give Me Love (Give Me Peace on Earth)".

== Recording ==
Despite having a highly publicised North American tour to prepare for – the first solo tour there by an ex-Beatle – as well as a new album to record beforehand, Harrison dedicated much of September and early October 1974 to organising Ravi Shankar's Music Festival from India. Harrison sponsored this concert revue, via his Material World Charitable Foundation, and produced a studio album for later release on his Dark Horse record label. Prior to this project, in late August through to the start of September, "Māya Love" was among four tracks rush-recorded at FPSHOT, Harrison's home studio in Henley-on-Thames, Oxfordshire, for inclusion on his album, also called Dark Horse. (Note: Only three of these songs subsequently appeared on the Dark Horse album, since "His Name Is Legs (Ladies and Gentlemen)" was held back for release until 1975.) Apart from Billy Preston, Harrison's old friend and former Apple Records protégé, the musicians at the sessions were relatively new to Harrison: saxophonist and L.A. Express band leader Tom Scott, and the much-admired rhythm section of Willie Weeks and Andy Newmark. These four musicians, all American, provided the nucleus of Harrison's tour band and lent his new music a contemporary edge. In addition to his guitar parts, Harrison contributed percussion to the recording, as "P. Roducer", one of his favoured pseudonyms over 1973–75.

The recording begins with Preston's "skittering" Fender Rhodes piano, which displays the influence of Ray Charles, Preston's former mentor. As other examples of a performance he describes as "chock full of R&B hooks", Leng notes the "tight, funky" support provided by Weeks on bass and Newmark's drums, and a "snappy" horn arrangement from Scott. The two instrumental breaks, serving as the song's bridges, feature first Preston and Harrison's slide guitar swapping solos, and then Scott (on tenor saxophone) and Harrison. The track ends with a break-down anchored by Weeks's bassline – an "especially nice" section, author Elliot Huntley writes, over which Harrison and Scott continue soloing through the fadeout.

Authors Chip Madinger and Mark Easter suggest that Harrison overdubbed his vocals at A&M Studios in Los Angeles, where he combined tour rehearsals with finishing the album, during the last three weeks of October. "Māya Love" was among the new songs included in Harrison's setlist for the tour, with a band now augmented by jazz percussionist Emil Richards, horn players Jim Horn and Chuck Findley, and others.

== Live performance ==
Due to the delay in completing the album, Dark Horse remained unissued until the final two weeks of the tour, which began at Vancouver's Pacific Coliseum on 2 November 1974. Another result of Harrison finishing the album so late was that he overworked his voice in Los Angeles, while carrying out vocal overdubs in the studio at night and rehearsing with his band during the day; as a result, he contracted laryngitis on the eve of the tour. Harrison's hoarse, Louis Armstrong-like singing marred the performances for many concertgoers and placed added importance on songs like "Māya Love", whose lengthy instrumental breaks afforded some respite for his voice. (Note: In addition, the setlist for the Western portion of the concerts included some fully instrumental selections: the show-opening "Hari's on Tour", also released on Dark Horse; a jazz-funk piece composed during the rehearsals, titled "Sound Stage of Mind"; and Tom Scott's track "Tom Cat".) In its concert version, Leng describes "Māya Love" as a "bottleneck showcase" for Harrison and an "effective live track", "full of the stabbing syncopations that characterized 1970s R&B". As with almost all the songs played on this tour, no live version of "Māya Love" is available officially, but it appears on the numerous bootlegs from the shows.

Aside from the song "Dark Horse", which Apple distributor Capitol Records had issued as an advance single in Canada and the United States, the studio version of "Māya Love" was the first track from the album to receive a public airing. Harrison played a rough mix of the song during his radio interview with KLOL's Levi Booker in the early hours of 25 November, following his well-received evening show at Houston's Hofheinz Pavilion. As when performing the song live, Harrison made a point of spelling out the title, telling Booker: "It's called 'Māya Love' – m-a-y-a – maya, which is a Sanskrit word, which translates as 'That which is not'."

== Release and reception ==
"Māya Love" appeared as the final track on side one of Dark Horse in its original LP format, following "Bye Bye, Love" and before side two's opener, "Ding Dong, Ding Dong". Some reviewers have noted the significance of this apparently conceptual sequencing, with "Bye Bye, Love" serving as a sardonic "kiss-off" to Boyd and Clapton, "Māya Love" providing a philosophical conclusion to the marital problems documented on side one of the album, and "Ding Dong" ushering in Harrison's new relationship with Arias.

On release, Billboard magazine listed "Māya Love" among the "best cuts" on an album that was "far more energetic" than its predecessor, Living in the Material World (1973), and provided "lots of FM potential". In another review that compared Dark Horse favourably with Harrison's acclaimed All Things Must Pass, Michael Gross of Circus Raves described the song as "a soft, funky rocker spiced by superb Billy Preston piano riffs" and noted its role as an answer to the "chanted desperation" of "Bye Bye, Love". As with the tour, a number of reviews for the album were unfavourable, however. In one of the most scathing of these, the NME's Bob Woffinden wrote: "No one track [on Dark Horse] has anything like a memorable melody. 'Maya Love' almost sounds like 'My Sweet Lord', though without the positive direction, and by then (the end of side one) George is turning in the same overworked licks quite relentlessly." Woffinden found the album's lyrics "objectionable" and dismissed those on "Māya Love" as part of "the whole oriental mysticism deal we've come to expect from the George we know and are beginning not to love".

In December 1975, three months after the release of Harrison's Extra Texture album, "Māya Love" appeared as the B-side to that album's second single, "This Guitar (Can't Keep from Crying)". Beatles author Bruce Spizer suggests that the selection of the year-old "Māya Love" was due to the lack of "hit candidates" on the melancholic Extra Texture. "This Guitar" was Harrison's riposte to the harsh criticism levelled at him for his 1974 tour and the Dark Horse album, particularly from Rolling Stone magazine. This single, issued in February 1976 in Britain, was the final release by Apple Records until its relaunching in the mid-1990s. While opining that Dark Horse offers "a lot of rewarding listening … for those willing to listen with an open mind", Blogcritics' Chaz Lipp includes "Māya Love" among the highlights, describing the track as a "soulful R&B number that benefits from Willie Weeks' bass and Billy Preston's electric piano".

== Personnel ==
- George Harrison – lead vocals, slide guitars, acoustic guitar, shaker, backing vocals
- Billy Preston – electric piano
- Willie Weeks – bass guitar
- Andy Newmark – drums
- Tom Scott – saxophones, horn arrangement

== Sources ==
- Dale C. Allison Jr, The Love There That's Sleeping: The Art and Spirituality of George Harrison, Continuum (New York, NY, 2006; ISBN 978-0-8264-1917-0).
- Keith Badman, The Beatles Diary Volume 2: After the Break-Up 1970–2001, Omnibus Press (London, 2001; ISBN 0-7119-8307-0).
- Harry Castleman & Walter J. Podrazik, All Together Now: The First Complete Beatles Discography 1961–1975, Ballantine Books (New York, NY, 1976; ISBN 0-345-25680-8).
- Alan Clayson, George Harrison, Sanctuary (London, 2003; ISBN 1-86074-489-3).
- The Editors of Rolling Stone, Harrison, Rolling Stone Press/Simon & Schuster (New York, NY, 2002; ISBN 0-7432-3581-9).
- Joshua M. Greene, Here Comes the Sun: The Spiritual and Musical Journey of George Harrison, John Wiley & Sons (Hoboken, NJ, 2006; ISBN 978-0-470-12780-3).
- George Harrison, I Me Mine, Chronicle Books (San Francisco, CA, 2002; ISBN 0-8118-3793-9).
- Elliot J. Huntley, Mystical One: George Harrison – After the Break-up of the Beatles, Guernica Editions (Toronto, ON, 2006; ISBN 1-55071-197-0).
- Ian Inglis, The Words and Music of George Harrison, Praeger (Santa Barbara, CA, 2010; ISBN 978-0-313-37532-3).
- Peter Lavezzoli, The Dawn of Indian Music in the West, Continuum (New York, NY, 2006; ISBN 0-8264-2819-3).
- Simon Leng, While My Guitar Gently Weeps: The Music of George Harrison, Hal Leonard (Milwaukee, WI, 2006; ISBN 1-4234-0609-5).
- Chip Madinger & Mark Easter, Eight Arms to Hold You: The Solo Beatles Compendium, 44.1 Productions (Chesterfield, MO, 2000; ISBN 0-615-11724-4).
- Robert Rodriguez, Fab Four FAQ 2.0: The Beatles' Solo Years, 1970–1980, Backbeat Books (Milwaukee, WI, 2010; ISBN 978-1-4165-9093-4).
- Nicholas Schaffner, The Beatles Forever, McGraw-Hill (New York, NY, 1978; ISBN 0-07-055087-5).
- Bruce Spizer, The Beatles Solo on Apple Records, 498 Productions (New Orleans, LA, 2005; ISBN 0-9662649-5-9).
- Gary Tillery, Working Class Mystic: A Spiritual Biography of George Harrison, Quest Books (Wheaton, IL, 2011; ISBN 978-0-8356-0900-5).
- Bob Woffinden, The Beatles Apart, Proteus (London, 1981; ISBN 0-906071-89-5).
