= On the Road to Freedom =

Studio album by Alvin Lee and Mylon LeFevre
- Released: 2 November 1973
- Recorded: 1973
- Studio: Space Studio, Oxfordshire
- Genre: Country rock
- Length: 38:30
- Label: Chrysalis
- Producer: Alvin Lee

Alvin Lee chronology
On the Road to Freedom (1973)	In Flight (1974)

Singles from On the Road to Freedom
- 1. "Fallen Angel" Released: November 1973; 2. "So Sad (No Love of His Own)" Released: 17 December 1973 (US); 19 April 1974 (UK)

On the Road to Freedom is an album by English rock musician Alvin Lee and American gospel singer Mylon LeFevre. Released in November 1973, it was the first solo project by Lee, who had achieved international success through his leadership of the blues rock band Ten Years After. The album was recorded at Lee's home studio in south Oxfordshire, which he and LeFevre built especially for the project. The guest musicians at the sessions included George Harrison, Steve Winwood, Jim Capaldi, Ron Wood and Mick Fleetwood. "Fallen Angel" and the Harrison-composed "So Sad (No Love of His Own)" were issued as singles from the album.

On the Road to Freedom was well received by music critics, although Lee's more subtle guitar playing and new musical direction were not welcomed by fans of Ten Years After. Lee released a sequel to the album in 2012, titled Still on the Road to Freedom.

== Background ==
In late 1972, Alvin Lee decided to undertake a solo project as a departure from the routine of touring and recording with his band Ten Years After. He later attributed his motivation to boredom with his role as a heavy rock guitar virtuoso and a belief that financial rewards had become the only factor in the band's continued existence. Having met Mylon LeFevre, an American gospel rock singer, when LeFevre's band played as a support act to Ten Years After, Lee invited him to Jamaica for a holiday. The two musicians began writing songs there and recording rough demos with a local reggae group.

At Lee's suggestion, LeFevre moved to England, where he helped convert a barn on Lee's property, Hook End Manor, near Woodcote in south Oxfordshire, into a recording studio. While construction was underway on what Lee named Space Studio, the pair worked on their songs at Roger Daltrey's home studio.

== Recording ==
In a 1974 interview with Zoo World magazine, Lee described his and LeFevre's collaboration as "[not] a commercial effort, just an LP recorded at home with some neighbors" and said that their starting point musically was country and western. Music journalist Charley Walters later summed up the album as a "potpourri of American rock and rhythm & blues" with elements of country and bluegrass. (Note: According to the product information supplied by Muze, the album's style "could be best described as hard spiritual rock".) Among the many guest musicians, LeFevre met George Harrison at a pub in nearby Henley-on-Thames, after which Harrison became a regular visitor to Hook End Manor and provided his sound engineer to help prepare the new recording facility. Other members of what became known as "the Thames Valley Gang" who also contributed to the album included Ron Wood, Tim Hinkley and Boz Burrell. Three members of the band Traffic – Stevie Winwood, Jim Capaldi and Reebop Kwaku Baah – were among the other participants, along with drummer Ian Wallace.

According to music journalist Chris Welch, the atmosphere at the sessions was "raucous and 'down home'". A potentially fatal incident occurred when heavy rain caused the roof of Lee's indoor tennis court, which he was using as an echo chamber, to collapse, moments after he and his engineer had retrieved the recording equipment from the building. The episode was later recalled in poet George Kalamaras's posthumous tribute to Alvin Lee, "The Bluest Blues"; according to Kalamaras, Winwood and LeFevre were "outside, discussing a take, smoking a joint" at the time, while Harrison was in the adjoining building.

All of the album's twelve tracks were written by Lee or LeFevre, apart from Wood's song "Let 'Em Say What They Will" and Harrison's "So Sad (No Love of His Own)". The latter was recorded in August 1973, with Fleetwood Mac drummer Mick Fleetwood also participating. The supergroup aspect of the recordings appealed to Lee's management, who had originally been opposed to the project, wanting Lee to instead maintain his lucrative touring schedule with Ten Years After. According to Lee, due to the prohibitive financial terms imposed by some of the guest artists' record companies, he and LeFevre were unable to acknowledge all of Harrison's contributions to the album, nor those of Mick Jagger. (Note: Harrison was credited, under his pseudonym "Hari Georgeson", only for his playing on "So Sad".)

== Release and reception ==
Professional ratings
Review scores
Source	Rating
AllMusic	3/5 stars
The Rolling Stone Record Guide	3/5 stars

Chrysalis Records issued On the Road to Freedom on 2 November 1973 in the UK, with the catalogue number CHR 1054. The album was released in the United States by Columbia Records on 7 December. The first single from the album was Lee's song "Fallen Angel". "So Sad (No Love of His Own)" was issued as a single on 17 December in the US and on 19 April 1974 in Britain.

The album received a favourable response from music critics but, according to Lee, it was not popular with fans of his previous work. In the United States, the album peaked at number 138 on the Billboard Top LPs & Tape chart.

Writing in Rolling Stone, Bud Scoppa said that in combining their respective strengths, "each [of the two artists] has released the other from the conventions in which they both stagnated. On On the Road to Freedom, we discover that Alvin Lee isn't just a slick blues guitarist and purveyor of boogie, and that LeFevre can do more than spew out gospel jive." Scoppa highlighted "Fallen Angel", "Carry My Load" and "On the Road to Freedom" as the best of the songs written by Lee or LeFevre, and similarly praised the Harrison and Wood compositions. In The Rolling Stone Record Guide (1983), John Swenson described the album as "excellent" while Charley Walters admired the expressivity of LeFevre's voice and the variation in Lee's guitar playing, which, he said, eschewed "the showing-off tendencies of Ten Years After". Walters deemed the mix of musical styles to be "Pleasingly pastoral and rustic".

== Aftermath and legacy ==
In a February 1975 issue of Rolling Stone, Barbara Charone cited On the Road to Freedom as the start of "The rejuvenation of Alvin Lee as a musician" and "the first step out of the musical prison TYA had become". Encouraged by the positive reviews for the LP, Lee followed it with a double live album, In Flight, recorded at London's Rainbow Theatre with a band that included Hinkley and Wallace from the 1973 sessions. Lee rejoined Ten Years After for a final US tour in 1974, after which, despite the band's management insisting otherwise, he announced their break-up.

Although Lee had told Zoo World that he and LeFevre would be collaborating again, and he confirmed the possibility of a follow-up album in 1975, LeFevre returned to his gospel career in the United States and later became a Christian church minister. Repertoire Records reissued On the Road to Freedom in 2003, with a liner note essay by Chris Welch and the addition of a bonus track – the UK single edit of "So Sad".

In 2012, Lee released a sequel to the 1973 album, titled Still on the Road to Freedom. In a concurrent interview with Rock's Backpages, Lee said that it had taken up to ten years for his core audience to fully appreciate On the Road to Freedom and that the album had sold well in the ensuing decades. Among reviews of the 2012 release, Glide Magazine described the Lee–LeFevre collaboration as a "landmark" album, while Blogcritics identified it as Lee's best recorded work outside of Ten Years After.

== Track listing ==
=== Original release ===
1. "On the Road to Freedom" (Alvin Lee) – 4:13
2. "The World Is Changing (I Got a Woman Back in Georgia)" (Lee, Mylon LeFevre) – 2:45
3. "So Sad (No Love of His Own)" (George Harrison) – 4:34
4. "Fallen Angel" (Lee) – 3:20
5. "Funny" (Lee) – 2:48
6. "We Will Shine" (LeFevre) – 2:37
7. "Carry My Load" (Lee) – 2:58
8. "Lay Me Back" (LeFevre) – 2:53
9. "Let 'Em Say What They Will" (Ron Wood) – 2:52
10. "I Can't Take It" (LeFevre) – 2:51
11. "Riffin" (Lee, LeFevre) – 3:31
12. "Rockin' 'Til the Sun Goes Down" (Lee, LeFevre) – 3:08

=== 2003 reissue ===
Bonus track

13. "So Sad (No Love of His Own)" [Single Version] (Harrison) – 3:00

== Personnel ==
According to the 2003 reissue CD booklet unless otherwise noted:

Musicians

- Alvin Lee – lead, harmony and backing vocals, electric and acoustic guitars, bass, sitar, drums on "Funny"
- Mylon LeFevre – lead, harmony and backing vocals, 6- and 12-string acoustic guitars, percussion, bass
- George Harrison (as "Hari Georgeson") – acoustic guitar, dobro, bass, harmony vocals on "So Sad"
- Ron Wood – electric and 12-string acoustic guitars, bass, slide guitar, drums on "Let ‘Em Say What They Will"
- Steve Winwood – piano, electric piano
- Tim Hinkley – piano, organ, backing vocals
- Boz Burrell – bass, backing vocals
- Bob Black – steel guitar
- Andy Stein – fiddle
- Ian Wallace – drums
- Jim Capaldi – drums, percussion
- Reebop Kwaku Baah – congas
- Mick Fleetwood – drums on "So Sad"
- Mike Patto – backing vocals, percussion

Production

- Harold Burgon, Andy Jaworski - recording engineer
- Alvin Lee - mixing
- Andy Jaworski, Roger Lowe - photography
- Chris Welch - liner notes (2003 reissue)
