= So Sad =

1973 song by George Harrison

Song by George Harrison

from the album Dark Horse
- Published: Harrisongs, November 1973
- Released: 9 December 1974
- Genre: Rock
- Length: 5:00
- Label: Apple
- Songwriter: George Harrison
- Producer: George Harrison

"So Sad" is a song by the English rock musician George Harrison that was released on his 1974 album Dark Horse. Harrison originally recorded the song for his previous album, Living in the Material World, before giving it to Alvin Lee, the guitarist and singer with Ten Years After. Lee recorded it – as "So Sad (No Love of His Own)" – with gospel singer Mylon LeFevre for their 1973 album On the Road to Freedom. The latter recording includes contributions from Harrison and marked the first of several collaborations between him and Lee.

Harrison began writing "So Sad" in New York in 1972 about the failure of his first marriage, to Pattie Boyd. The lyrics present a stark winter imagery that contrasts with the springtime optimism of his Beatles composition "Here Comes the Sun". Harrison recorded his version of the song during a period of romantic intrigue surrounding his marriage and those of fellow musicians Ron Wood and Ringo Starr. The main recording session took place at Harrison and Boyd's home, Friar Park, in November 1973, eight months before she left him for Eric Clapton. Aside from Harrison's extensive contributions on vocals, guitars and keyboards, the musicians on the recording include Starr, Nicky Hopkins and Jim Keltner.

Several reviewers have highlighted "So Sad" as a standout track on the otherwise disappointing Dark Horse album. While commenting on its bleak depiction of lost love, author Simon Leng describes the song as "the temporary death of [Harrison's] Krishna dream", reflecting the singer's surrender to human sorrow over his spiritual resolve.

== Background and inspiration ==
I like this song a lot as a melody and lyrically, except the only problem is it's depressing. It is so sad. It was at the time I was splitting up with Pattie.

— George Harrison, 1979

In his 1980 autobiography, I, Me, Mine, George Harrison recalls that he started writing "So Sad" in 1972 while in New York. He reproduces his original lyrics in the book, written on stationery from the Park Lane Hotel in Manhattan. Harrison identifies this period as when he was breaking up with his first wife, Pattie Boyd, although the couple did not formally separate until July 1974, when Boyd left him for Eric Clapton.

Al Aronowitz, a New York-based journalist and a friend of the Harrisons, (Note: Having achieved international renown as a fashion model in the 1960s, Boyd retained her surname after marrying Harrison, yet was also referred to as Pattie Harrison.) later expressed his surprise at the failure of their marriage, saying: "I never saw the breakup coming … around them everything seemed magical." Harrison and Boyd met on the set of the Beatles' film A Hard Day's Night in 1964 and were married two years later. By the late 1960s, however, they had begun to grow apart due to Harrison's preoccupation with meditation and other spiritual pursuits. (Note: In addition, according to Boyd, Harrison's ascetic ways were contrasted by his periods of excessive drinking and drug-taking, and womanising.) In an effort to regain her husband's attention, in 1970, Boyd responded to Clapton's long-held infatuation with her, only to reject his advances at that time. Unable to conceive a child, and with Harrison averse to adoption, Boyd resumed her career as a fashion model in May 1971, an activity that sat at odds with his spiritual convictions. According to Harrison biographer Elliot Huntley, the first public signs of a rift in the marriage came in August 1972. That month, Harrison travelled alone through Europe to Portugal to visit Gary Wright, who then "played the diplomat" by fending off press speculation regarding Boyd's absence.

Author Ian Inglis describes "So Sad" as the first Harrison composition to "explicitly address the collapse of his marriage". The song was copyrighted to Harrisongs in November 1973 as "So Sad (No Love of His Own)", a title that recalls that of the Everly Brothers' hit "So Sad (To Watch Good Love Go Bad)". Along with his song "So Sad", Harrison's 1974 album Dark Horse included a version of the Everly Brothers' "Bye Bye, Love", the lyrics of which he altered to sarcastically address Boyd's eloping with Clapton. While expressing confusion over the motivation behind this reworking of "Bye Bye, Love", Inglis views "So Sad" as a reflection of the profound sense of loss that Harrison genuinely felt. Among other examples of the depth of the couple's shared experiences, Inglis cites Boyd's role as Harrison's companion at the height of Beatlemania, their joint embrace of Indian spirituality, and her presence throughout his emergence as a solo artist. (Note: In her 2007 autobiography, Wonderful Today, Boyd recalls that she only took stock of the full impact of their separation in the 1980s, once her marriage to Clapton had also failed. Boyd says she should have "fought for my marriage to George" and that they were soulmates, whereas she and Clapton were "playmates".)

== Composition ==
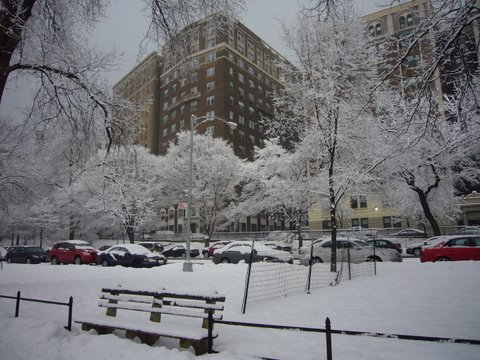
Winter in New York City, where Harrison began writing the song in 1972

"So Sad" is in 4/4 time throughout, while its musical key changes from C major in the verses to D major over the choruses. The song opens and closes with a descending, eight-bar instrumental passage. In between these two passages, it comprises three combinations of verse and chorus.

While Clapton has commented on Harrison's "cavalier" attitude to his pursuit of Boyd in 1970, and Boyd has described her husband's behaviour as "cold and indifferent", the song conveys his despair at the failure of their relationship. In his lyrics, Harrison revisits the weather-themed imagery of his late-period Beatles compositions "All Things Must Pass" and "Here Comes the Sun". Whereas the latter song conveyed optimism and rejuvenation, however, "So Sad" reflects the onset of winter and, in author Simon Leng's description, "hope replaced with tiredness, sunshine supplanted by gloom". Author Bruce Spizer writes that the opening lines alone – "Now the winter has come / Eclipsing the sun / That has lighted my love for some time" – evoke "the opposite emotions of [Harrison's] uplifting 'Here Comes the Sun'". (Note: Spizer also comments on the irony of such comparisons, since Harrison wrote "Here Comes the Sun" in Clapton's garden.)

The singer's viewpoint changes between the first and third person during the song. At the start of the choruses, Harrison describes himself as the protagonist who "feels so alone / With no love of his own". These words accompany a chord sequence – comprising D major, D augmented, D6 and E7 – over which the melody ascends, creating musical tension. The ensuing refrain provides what Leng terms "cathartic release" with the repeated phrase "So sad / So bad".

While he expresses sorrow throughout the song, Harrison avoids detailing the reasons for the end of the relationship. In the second verse, he sings of "the problem of just being there" – a line that theologian Dale Allison interprets as central to Harrison's philosophical outlook, which espoused striving to transcend the mundane aspects of human existence.

Author Joshua Greene describes "So Sad" as a song that tells of "cold winds, lost love, and dreams abandoned". In the final verse, Harrison urges his lover to give "the dawn of the day" to someone who can rekindle their shared dream. He concludes with a lyric that Inglis deems poignant in its revelation of the singer's feelings of loss: "It's too late for to make a new start."

== Pre-Dark Horse recording history ==
=== Living in the Material World sessions ===
Harrison initially recorded "So Sad" for Living in the Material World (1973), his most overtly religious album, but did not include the track on that release. The recording sessions took place between October 1972 and February 1973, at the Beatles' Apple Studios in London and at Harrison's home studio, FPSHOT, in Henley-on-Thames. The personnel at the sessions were Harrison, keyboard players Wright and Nicky Hopkins, drummers Ringo Starr and Jim Keltner, and bass player Klaus Voormann – many of whom later played on Harrison's official version of the song.

Among other unreleased recordings from the Material World sessions, Harrison and Starr taped a version of their joint composition "Photograph" in December 1972. Another song about lost love, "Photograph" presents a similarly bleak picture of a failed romance, sharing with "So Sad" the theme that any possibility of a reunion between the two protagonists has long passed. (Note: Starr subsequently remade "Photograph" in Los Angeles with producer Richard Perry in March 1973. When issued as the lead single from Starr's album Ringo later that year, it became the third song written or co-written by Harrison to top the US Billboard Hot 100 chart since the Beatles' break-up.)

=== Alvin Lee and Mylon LeFevre version ===
"So Sad (No Love of His Own)"
- European picture sleeve

Single by Alvin Lee and Mylon LeFevre

from the album On the Road to Freedom
- B-side: "On the Road to Freedom"
- Released: 17 December 1973
- Genre: Country
- Length: 3:00 (single edit)
- Label: Columbia
- Songwriter: George Harrison
- Producer: Alvin Lee

Harrison became friends with Ten Years After frontman Alvin Lee after the two guitarists met in Henley's Row Barge pub. Hearing that Lee was recording a solo album with American gospel singer Mylon LeFevre, Harrison offered him "So Sad", which they recorded together in August 1973. Also playing on the session was drummer Mick Fleetwood, who was married to Boyd's sister Jenny at the time, and Faces guitarist Ron Wood. According to Ten Years After biographer Herb Staehr, Lee, Harrison and Wood were part of "the Thames Valley Gang" of English rock musicians, who met regularly at Lee's Hook End Manor property in Woodcote, close to Harrison's Friar Park estate in Henley.

As well as including the parenthetical "No Love of His Own" in the title, the Lee–LeFevre version of "So Sad" differs from Harrison's in mood. Performed in the country style, with a dobro part by Harrison, the recording highlights the song's "heartbreak aspects", according to Leng, who likens it to "'Jolene' and other country tearjerkers". Among several further collaborations between Lee and Harrison, Lee made a guest appearance on the debut album by Splinter, which Harrison was producing for his new Dark Horse record label. In addition, Lee, together with Wood, played on Harrison's Dark Horse track "Ding Dong, Ding Dong". (Note: Along with musicians such as Joe Brown, Mick Ralphs and Jon Lord, Lee became a member of Harrison's so-called "Henley Music Mafia" of local rock stars in the late 1970s. Harrison subsequently contributed slide guitar to Lee's albums Detroit Diesel (1986), Zoom (1992) and Nineteen Ninety-Four (1994).)

The song was released on Lee and LeFevre's On the Road to Freedom album in November 1973, and as the A-side of a single the following month. (Note: For the single, the track was edited down to 3:00 from its full running time of 4:34.) The album was critically well received, and Billboard included "So Sad" among its recommended singles for the week of 22 December 1973. Writing in Rolling Stone, Bud Scoppa paired the track with the Wood-composed "Let 'Em Say What They Will" as "two non-originals [that] are beauties", adding: "George Harrison's 'So Sad (No Love of His Own)' sounds to me like one of his best songs."

== Dark Horse recording ==
"So Sad" was the oldest of the songs written by Harrison and recorded for Dark Horse, the sessions for which began in November 1973. Author Peter Doggett describes Friar Park as having become "a haven of adulterous intrigue" by this time, with Harrison conducting an affair with Maureen Starkey, the wife of his former Beatles bandmate Ringo Starr. This dalliance followed an episode of wife-swapping between the Harrisons and the Woods, when Wood embarked on a brief affair with Boyd in the Bahamas as Harrison holidayed with Wood's wife Krissy in Portugal. Late that year, rumours of problems in the Harrisons' marriage circulated after Wood announced to the British press that "my romance with Pattie is definitely on".

The basic track for "So Sad" was taped at FPSHOT with Phil McDonald as the recording engineer. Aside from Harrison, the musicians included Hopkins (on piano) and Starr and Keltner (on drums). According to Starr's comments in a contemporary interview, the session took place in November 1973; while confirming this date in a press conference the following year, Harrison said that Voormann also participated on bass. The bass part was subsequently overdubbed by Willie Weeks, whom Harrison first met in July 1974 while they were both working on Wood's first solo album, I've Got My Own Album to Do. Harrison played a wide range of instruments on the song. Credited as "guitars and the other things", these include 12-string acoustic guitars, electric piano and slide-guitar parts.

Due to his other commitments, which included setting up Dark Horse Records and organising his and Ravi Shankar's joint North American tour, Harrison had to complete songs such as "So Sad" in Los Angeles in October 1974. There, the combination of recording and tour rehearsals overtaxed his voice, leading to him contracting laryngitis, which marred his vocal performances on Dark Horse and during the subsequent tour. While ruing that Dark Horse made Harrison's affliction "a matter of public record", authors Chip Madinger and Mark Easter consider that the subject matter of "So Sad", like the album's title track, invited this more tortured style of singing.

In his description of the completed recording, Leng views the song as a "harrowing encounter, a far more savage affair than the Alvin Lee take", due to the musical arrangement and the "pained mood" established by Harrison's vocals. He adds that the "weeping slide guitar riffs" contribute to a musical catharsis that recalls Lennon's primal therapy-inspired Plastic Ono Band album.

== Release and reception ==
I'm a musician, not a talker. I mean, if you just get my album – it's like Peyton Place. It'll tell you exactly what I've been doing … One [song]'s called "So Sad," one's called "Simply Shady." You'll just hear it …

— Harrison in October 1974

Apple Records issued Dark Horse in December 1974, with "So Sad" sequenced as the third track on side one of the LP. It appeared as the second of three autobiographical songs detailing Harrison's troubled personal life, preceded by "Simply Shady", his account of decadence in the music industry, and followed by "Bye Bye, Love". During his pre-tour press conference in October, Harrison likened the album to the television soap opera Peyton Place. He also expressed his happiness for Boyd and Clapton, saying: "Eric Clapton has been a close friend for years … I'd rather she was with him than some dope." (Note: After his arrival in Los Angeles, Harrison met his future wife Olivia Arias, who worked for A&M Records, the distributor of Dark Horse Records. Her face appeared on the side-two face labels of the Dark Horse LP while Harrison's was on side one. In music critic Bob Woffinden's description, further to the track sequencing, this gesture suggested that Harrison was farewelling Boyd on side one and ushering in Arias on the LP's second side.)

Like the Harrison–Shankar North American tour, Dark Horse received mainly unfavourable reviews from music critics, many of whom condemned Harrison for his hoarse singing and for having rushed the recording to capitalise on the tour. In his highly unfavourable critique for Rolling Stone, Jim Miller considered "So Sad" to be "one of the album's few resonant moments" and a song that "probably tells the truth" regarding Harrison's state of mind, unlike "Bye, Bye Love", which he found "a sick man's idea of a joke". Bob Woffinden of the NME labelled "So Sad" "a trite, self-pitying number, both unoriginal and lifeless, with the vocals again sounding portentous and unnatural". Woffinden added: "When somebody sings 'While his memory raced/with much speed and great haste', you just know the lyricist is floundering and filling in lines."

Writing in Circus Raves magazine, Michael Gross described the track as "luxurious", with a guitar introduction that "[speaks] to the poverty of loneliness". Billboard's reviewer said the album was "an excellent one" and listed "So Sad" first among its "best cuts". In his 1977 book Beatles Forever, Nicholas Schaffner similarly identified the track as a highlight of Dark Horse, adding that the effect of the opening guitar collage made for "delectable listening".

== Retrospective assessment and legacy ==
Simon Leng considers "So Sad" to be the antithesis of "Here Comes the Sun", marking "the temporary death of George's Krishna dream" as spiritual conviction proves inadequate against "the human pain of separation". He comments on how the Dark Horse version was "[t]he subject of scorn on release", yet Lee and LeFevre's recording of "So Sad" "merited not a single critical sneer" the year before; according to Leng, this contrast "illustrates the difficulty of being George Harrison in 1974". (Note: Leng contends that a large part of the unfavourable critical reception to Dark Horse stemmed from Harrison's rejection of rock 'n' roll – especially his refusal to pander to the perception of him as "Beatle George" – during his and Shankar's 1974 tour, which was the first US tour by a former Beatle.) Writing in their Solo Beatles Compendium, Chip Madinger and Mark Easter view the recording as "one of the more impressive tunes" on Dark Horse, adding that Harrison's "12-string guitar work is particularly striking".

AllMusic's Richard Ginell nominates "So Sad" as one of two "AMG track picks" on Dark Horse. Writing for the music website Something Else!, Nick DeRiso includes the song among the "five often-forgotten gems" from Harrison's Apple Records discography, and notes its "elegiac tone", similar to that of Living in the Material World. Reviewing Harrison's career for Goldmine magazine in 2002, Dave Thompson described "So Sad" as overlong but "classic Harrison" nevertheless.

Writing for Vintage Rock, Shawn Perry describes the track as "ruefully poignant" and a song that "overflows with a flavour [of] simple and sincere beauty".

In his liner-note essay to the 2003 reissue of On the Road to Freedom, Chris Welch concludes by referring to Lee's sorrow at the death of Harrison in November 2001, as well as his satisfaction that "So Sad" "is part of an album that recalls the carefree days of rock'n'roll fun – and freedom". Iain Matthews, a former member of Fairport Convention, released a cover of the song on his 1993 compilation Orphans & Outcasts, Vol. 1. In 2011, Matthews' version appeared on the multi-artist Harrison Uncovered CD, which accompanied a feature by Mojo tying in with the release of Martin Scorsese's documentary George Harrison: Living in the Material World.

== Personnel ==
Alvin Lee & Mylon LeFevre version

Credits adapted from those in the 2003 reissue of On the Road to Freedom:

- Mylon LeFevre – lead and harmony vocals
- Alvin Lee – acoustic guitars, backing vocals
- George Harrison (as "Hari Georgeson") – acoustic guitar, dobro, bass, harmony vocal
- Ron Wood – 12-string acoustic guitar
- Mick Fleetwood – drums

George Harrison version

Credits adapted from those in the 2014 reissue of Dark Horse:

- George Harrison – vocals, 12-string acoustic guitars, electric guitar, electric pianos, slide guitars, backing vocals
- Nicky Hopkins – piano
- Ringo Starr – drums
- Jim Keltner – drums
- Willie Weeks – bass

== Sources ==
- Dale C. Allison Jr, The Love There That's Sleeping: The Art and Spirituality of George Harrison, Continuum (New York, NY, 2006; ISBN 978-0-8264-1917-0).
- Keith Badman, The Beatles Diary Volume 2: After the Break-Up 1970–2001, Omnibus Press (London, 2001; ISBN 0-7119-8307-0).
- Pattie Boyd (with Penny Junor), Wonderful Today: The Autobiography, Headline Review (London, 2007; ISBN 978-0-7553-1646-5).
- Harry Castleman & Walter J. Podrazik, All Together Now: The First Complete Beatles Discography 1961–1975, Ballantine Books (New York, NY, 1976; ISBN 0-345-25680-8).
- Alan Clayson, George Harrison, Sanctuary (London, 2003; ISBN 1-86074-489-3).
- Peter Doggett, You Never Give Me Your Money: The Beatles After the Breakup, It Books (New York, NY, 2011; ISBN 978-0-06-177418-8).
- The Editors of Rolling Stone, Harrison, Rolling Stone Press/Simon & Schuster (New York, NY, 2002; ISBN 0-7432-3581-9).
- Joshua M. Greene, Here Comes the Sun: The Spiritual and Musical Journey of George Harrison, John Wiley & Sons (Hoboken, NJ, 2006; ISBN 978-0-470-12780-3).
- George Harrison, I Me Mine, Chronicle Books (San Francisco, CA, 2002 [1980]; ISBN 0-8118-3793-9).
- Bill Harry, The George Harrison Encyclopedia, Virgin Books (London, 2003; ISBN 978-0-753508220).
- Elliot J. Huntley, Mystical One: George Harrison – After the Break-up of the Beatles, Guernica Editions (Toronto, ON, 2006; ISBN 1-55071-197-0).
- Ian Inglis, The Words and Music of George Harrison, Praeger (Santa Barbara, CA, 2010; ISBN 978-0-313-37532-3).
- Ashley Kahn (ed.), George Harrison on George Harrison: Interviews and Encounters, Chicago Review Press (Chicago, IL, 2020; ISBN 978-1-64160-051-4).
- Simon Leng, While My Guitar Gently Weeps: The Music of George Harrison, Hal Leonard (Milwaukee, WI, 2006; ISBN 1-4234-0609-5).
- Chip Madinger & Mark Easter, Eight Arms to Hold You: The Solo Beatles Compendium, 44.1 Productions (Chesterfield, MO, 2000; ISBN 0-615-11724-4).
- Chris O'Dell (with Katherine Ketcham), Miss O'Dell: My Hard Days and Long Nights with The Beatles, The Stones, Bob Dylan, Eric Clapton, and the Women They Loved, Touchstone (New York, NY, 2009; ISBN 978-1-4165-9093-4).
- Robert Rodriguez, Fab Four FAQ 2.0: The Beatles' Solo Years, 1970–1980, Backbeat Books (Milwaukee, WI, 2010; ISBN 978-1-4165-9093-4).
- Patricia Romanowski & Holly George-Warren (eds), The New Rolling Stone Encyclopedia of Rock & Roll, Fireside/Rolling Stone Press (New York, NY, 1995; ISBN 0-684-81044-1).
- Nicholas Schaffner, The Beatles Forever, McGraw-Hill (New York, NY, 1978; ISBN 0-07-055087-5).
- Mat Snow, The Beatles Solo: The Illustrated Chronicles of John, Paul, George, and Ringo After the Beatles (Volume 3: George), Race Point Publishing (New York, NY, 2013; ISBN 978-1-937994-26-6).
- Bruce Spizer, The Beatles Solo on Apple Records, 498 Productions (New Orleans, LA, 2005; ISBN 0-9662649-5-9).
- Gary Tillery, Working Class Mystic: A Spiritual Biography of George Harrison, Quest Books (Wheaton, IL, 2011; ISBN 978-0-8356-0900-5).
- Bob Woffinden, The Beatles Apart, Proteus (London, 1981; ISBN 0-906071-89-5).
- Ronnie Wood, Ronnie, Macmillan (Sydney, NSW, 2007; ISBN 978-1-4050-3817-1).
