= 2012 24 Hours of Spa =

2012 Total Spa 24 Hours

Seasons
- ← 2011 2013 →

Layout of the Circuit de Spa-Francorchamps

The 2012 Total 24 Hours of Spa was the 65th running of the 24 Hours of Spa. It was the fourth round of the 2012 Blancpain Endurance Series season and was held over the 28 and 29 of July at the Circuit de Spa-Francorchamps in Belgium. The race was won by Andrea Piccini, Rene Rast and Frank Stippler driving an Audi.

== Entry list ==
On 4 July, the RACB and SRO Belgium released the provisional entry list.

2012 Entry List
No.	Team	Car	Drivers			
Pro Cup
1	(Belgium) Belgian Audi Club Team WRT	Audi R8 LMS Ultra	(France) Stéphane Ortelli	(Germany) Christopher Mies	(Germany) Christopher Haase	
2	(Belgium) Belgian Audi Club Team WRT	Audi R8 LMS Ultra	(Belgium) Laurens Vanthoor	(Sweden) Edward Sandström	(Italy) Marco Bonanomi	
3	(Belgium) Marc VDS Racing Team	BMW Z4 GT3	(Belgium) Bas Leinders	(Belgium) Maxime Martin	(Finland) Markus Palttala	
4	(Belgium) Marc VDS Racing Team	BMW Z4 GT3	(Belgium) Bert Longin	(Netherlands) Mike Hezemans	(Switzerland) Henri Moser	
6	(Germany) Audi Sport Team Phoenix	Audi R8 LMS Ultra	(Switzerland) Marcel Fässler	(Germany) André Lotterer	(Denmark) Tom Kristensen	
9	(United Kingdom) Gulf Racing UK	McLaren MP4-12C GT3	(United Kingdom) Rob Bell	(United Kingdom) Andy Meyrick	(United Kingdom) Michael Wainwright	
16	(Germany) Audi Sport Performance Team	Audi R8 LMS Ultra	(Italy) Andrea Piccini	(Germany) René Rast	(Germany) Frank Stippler	
36	(Netherlands) DB Motorsport	BMW Z4 GT3	(Netherlands) Jeroen den Boer	(Belgium) Jeffrey van Hooydonk	(Belgium) Stéphane Lémeret	
43	(France) Saintéloc Racing	Audi R8 LMS Ultra	(Portugal) Filipe Albuquerque	(France) Dino Lunardi	(France) Grégory Guilvert	
66	(Germany) BMW/Vita4One Racing Team	BMW Z4 GT3	(Belgium) Gregory Franchi	(Germany) Frank Kechele	(Austria) Mathias Lauda	
69	(United Kingdom) Gulf Racing UK	McLaren MP4-12C GT3	(United Kingdom) Jamie Campbell-Walter	(United Kingdom) Stuart Hall	(Germany) Roald Goethe	
71	(Switzerland) Kessel Racing	Ferrari 458 Italia GT3	(Italy) Davide Rigon	(Italy) Daniel Zampieri	(Italy) Stefano Gattuso	
75	(Belgium) Prospeed Competition	Porsche 997 GT3-R	(Belgium) Marc Goossens	(Netherlands) Xavier Maassen	(Germany) Marc Hennerici	
83	(France) SMG Challenge	Porsche 997 GT3-R	(France) Philippe Gache	(France) Olivier Pla	(France) Eric Clément	
Pro-Am Cup
5	(Belgium) Boutsen Ginion Racing	McLaren MP4-12C GT3	(United Kingdom) Jack Clarke	(Belgium) Nico Verdonck	(Belgium) Edouard Mondron	(Belgium) Eric van de Poele
7	(Slovakia) ARC Bratislava	Porsche 997 GT3-R	(Slovakia) Miro Konôpka	(Slovakia) Zdeno Mikulasko	(Italy) Stefano Crotti	(Belgium) Christoff Corten
8	(Germany) Haribo Racing Team	Porsche 997 GT3-R	(Germany) Christian Menzel	(Germany) Hans Guido Riegel	(Germany) Mike Stursberg	(Germany) Uwe Alzen
10	(France) SOFREV ASP	Ferrari 458 Italia GT3	(France) Olivier Panis	(France) Christian Moulin-Traffort	(France) Fabien Barthez	(France) Eric Debard
12	(France) ART Grand Prix	McLaren MP4-12C GT3	(United Kingdom) Duncan Tappy	(France) Grégoire Demoustier	(France) Mike Parisy	(France) Ulric Amado
14	(Belgium) KRK Racing	Mercedes-Benz SLS AMG GT3	(Netherlands) Dennis Retera	(Belgium) Raf Vanthoor	(Belgium) Anthony Kumpen	(Belgium) Koen Wauters
15	(Belgium) Boutsen Ginion Racing	McLaren MP4-12C GT3	(Italy) Massimo Vagliani	(Belgium) Jérôme Thiry	(Belgium) Sarah Bovy	(France) Marlène Broggi
17	(United States) Insight Racing	Ferrari 458 Italia GT3	(Denmark) Martin Jensen	(Denmark) Dennis Andersen	(United Kingdom) Iain Dockerill	
18	(Germany) Black Falcon	Mercedes-Benz SLS AMG GT3	(Netherlands) Jeroen Bleekemolen	(Luxembourg) Steve Jans	(United States) Bret Curtis	(China) Franky Cheng
19	(Germany) Black Falcon	Mercedes-Benz SLS AMG GT3	(United Kingdom) Oliver Morley	(Germany) Manuel Metzger	(Germany) Stephan Rösler	(Germany) Kenneth Heyer
20	(France) SOFREV ASP	Ferrari 458 Italia GT3	(France) Patrice Goueslard	(France) Ludovic Badey	(France) Jean-Luc Beaubélique	(France) Tristan Vautier
21	(United Kingdom) MTECH	Ferrari 458 Italia GT3	(Republic of Ireland) Matt Griffin	(United Kingdom) Duncan Cameron	(United Kingdom) Mike Edmonds	(Italy) Niki Cadei
23	(United States) United Autosports	Audi R8 LMS Ultra	(United Kingdom) Mark Blundell	(United States) Mark Patterson	(Hong Kong) Alain Li	(United Kingdom) Richard Meins
24	(Germany) Blancpain Reiter	Lamborghini Gallardo LP600+	(Netherlands) Peter Kox	(Netherlands) Jos Menten	(Switzerland) Marc A. Hayek	
29	(Italy) ROAL Motorsport	BMW Z4 GT3	(Netherlands) Tom Coronel	(Italy) Edoardo Liberati	(Italy) Stefano Colombo	(Italy) Michela Cerruti
30	(United Kingdom) GT3 Racing	Audi R8 LMS	(United Kingdom) Phil Keen	(United Kingdom) Aaron Scott	(United Kingdom) Craig Wilkins	(United Kingdom) Peter Belshaw
33	(France) Pro GT by Alméras	Porsche 997 GT3-R	(France) Antoine Leclerc	(France) Eric Dermont	(France) David Tuchbant	(France) Franck Perera
34	(France) Pro GT by Alméras	Porsche 997 GT3-R	(France) Anthony Beltoise	(France) Roland Berville	(France) Henry Hassid	
35	(United Kingdom) GT Academy Team RJN	Nissan GT-R GT3	(United Kingdom) Alex Buncombe	(United Kingdom) Jann Mardenborough	(United Kingdom) Chris Ward	(Spain) Lucas Ordóñez
37	(Netherlands) DB Motorsport	BMW Z4 GT3	(Netherlands) Simon Knap	(Netherlands) Jochen Habets	(Canada) Andrew Danyliw	(Netherlands) Leon Rijnbeek
42	(France) Sport Garage	Ferrari 458 Italia GT3	(France) Lionel Comole	(France) Romain Brandela	(France) Kevin Despinasse	(France) Michaël Petit
44	(France) Sport Garage	Ferrari 458 Italia GT3	(France) Gilles Duqueine	(France) Eric Vaissière	(France) André-Alain Corbel	(France) Christian Beroujon
47	(Portugal) ASM Team	McLaren MP4-12C GT3	(Saudi Arabia) Karim Ojjeh	(Portugal) Ricardo Bravo	(Portugal) Pedro Lamy	(Portugal) Luis Silva
49	(Italy) AF Corse	Ferrari 458 Italia GT3	(France) Yannick Mallégol	(United States) Howard Blank	(France) Jean-Marc Bachelier	(France) François Perrodo
50	(Italy) AF Corse	Ferrari 458 Italia GT3	(Belgium) Enzo Ide	(Italy) Raffaele Giammaria	(Italy) Marco Cioci	(South Africa) Jack Gerber
51	(Italy) AF Corse	Ferrari 458 Italia GT3	(Finland) Toni Vilander	(United Kingdom) Daniel Brown	(Italy) Giuseppe Cirò	(Venezuela) Gaetano Ardagna Perez
52	(Italy) AF Corse	Ferrari 458 Italia GT3	(Italy) Andrea Bertolini	(Netherlands) Niek Hommerson	(Belgium) Louis Machiels	(Italy) Alessandro Pier Guidi
57	Vita4One Team Italy	Ferrari 458 Italia GT3	(Italy) Eugenio Amos	(Italy) Alessandro Bonacini	(Italy) Giacomo Petrobelli	(Switzerland) Jonathan Hirschi
59	Vita4One Team Italy	Ferrari 458 Italia GT3	(Italy) Alessandro Bonetti	(Italy) Andrea Ceccato	(United Kingdom) Michael Lyons	(Czech Republic) Filip Salaquarda
60	(United Kingdom) Von Ryan Racing	McLaren MP4-12C GT3	(United Kingdom) Stephen Jelley	(Netherlands) Stef Dusseldorp	(United Kingdom) Julien Draper	(United Kingdom) Matthew Draper
62	(Germany) Lapidus Racing	McLaren MP4-12C GT3	(United Kingdom) Tim Mullen	(United Kingdom) Adam Christodoulou	(Netherlands) Klaas Hummel	(Germany) Andreas Möntmann
70	(Netherlands) Race Art	BMW Z4 GT3	(Netherlands) Nick Catsburg	(Netherlands) Jaap van Lagen	(Netherlands) Roger Grouwels	(United Kingdom) Robert Nearn
72	(Switzerland) Kessel Racing	Ferrari 458 Italia GT3	(France) Marc Rostan	(France) Pierre Bruneau	(France) Claude-Yves Gosselin	(Italy) Lorenzo Bontempelli
74	(Belgium) Prospeed Competition	Porsche 997 GT3-R	(Belgium) Maxime Soulet	(Netherlands) Paul van Splunteren	(Belgium) Dylan Derdaele	(Belgium) Fred Bouvy
80	(Switzerland) Emil Frey Racing	Jaguar XK-R	(Switzerland) Fredy Barth	(Switzerland) Gabriele Gardel	(Switzerland) Lorenz Frey	(Switzerland) Rolf Maritz
88	(United Kingdom) Von Ryan Racing	McLaren MP4-12C GT3	(United Kingdom) Rob Barff	(United Kingdom) Chris Goodwin	(Portugal) Álvaro Parente	(New Zealand) Roger Wills
89	(Belgium) GPR AMR	Aston Martin V12 Vantage GT3	(Belgium) Bertrand Baguette	(Belgium) Tim Verberg	(Belgium) Damien Dupont	(Belgium) Ronnie Latinne
90	(United Kingdom) Preci-Spark	Mercedes-Benz SLS AMG GT3	(Germany) Bernd Schneider	(United Kingdom) Mike Jordan	(United Kingdom) David Jones	(United Kingdom) Godfrey Jones
107	(United Kingdom) Beechdean-Aston Martin Racing	Aston Martin V12 Vantage GT3	(United Kingdom) Jonathan Adam	(United Kingdom) John Gaw	(United Kingdom) Andrew Howard	(United Kingdom) Phil Dryburgh
Gentlemen Trophy
25	(Belgium) First Motorsport	Porsche 997 GT3 Cup S	(Belgium) Steve van Bellingen	(Belgium) Bert Redant	(Belgium) Armand Fumal	(Belgium) Johan Vanloo
41	(France) Saintéloc Racing	Audi R8 LMS	(Switzerland) Pierre Hirschi	(United Kingdom) Robert Hissom	(France) Philippe Marie	
58	(France) Exagon Engineering	Porsche 997 GT3-R	(Belgium) Christian Kelders	(France) Daniel Desbruères	(France) Jean-Luc Blanchemain	
73	(Switzerland) Kessel Racing	Ferrari 430 Scuderia	(Argentina) Pablo Paladino	(Venezuela) Paolo Andreasi	(Switzerland) Beniamino Caccia	(Italy) Giacomo Piccini
81	(Sweden) ALFAB Racing	Audi R8 LMS	(Sweden) Erik Behrens	(Sweden) Daniel Roos	(Sweden) Patrik Skoog	(Sweden) Magnus Öhman
82	(France) Bull Fight Racing/GCR	Dodge Viper CC	(France) Gaël Lesoudier	(France) Guy Clairay	(France) Christophe Decultot	(France) Pierre Fontaine
85	(Belgium) Racing Adventures	Ford Mustang	(Belgium) Raphaël van der Straten	(Belgium) Nicolas De Crem	(Belgium) José Close	(Belgium) Wolfgang Haugg
98	(Sweden) JB Motorsport	Audi R8 LMS	(Sweden) Jan Brunstedt	(Sweden) Mikael Bender	(Sweden) Jocke Mangs	
Cup Class
32	(France) Pro GT by Alméras	Porsche 997 GT3 Cup	(France) Matthieu Vaxivière	(France) Jean-Louis Alloin	(France) Jérémy Alloin	(France) Alain Ferté
84	(Netherlands) Race Art	Porsche 997 GT3 Cup	(Netherlands) Mathijs Harkema	(Belgium) 'Brody'	(Belgium) Christophe Geoffroy	(France) Henri Richard
86	(France) RMS	Porsche 997 GT3 Cup	(France) Thierry Stepec	(France) Eric Mouez	(France) David Loger	(France) Philippe Salini
87	(France) RMS	Porsche 997 GT3 Cup	(Switzerland) Fabio Spirgi	(Switzerland) Richard Feller	(France) Olivier Baron	(Switzerland) Manuel Nicolaïdis
95	(Belgium) Speedlover	Porsche 997 GT3 Cup	(France) Christophe Bigourie	(Belgium) Raf Vleugels	(Belgium) Nicolas Vandierendonck	

== Race ==
Class winners in bold. Cars failing to complete 70% of winner's distance marked as Not Classified (NC).

Pos	Class	No	Team	Drivers	Chassis	Tyre	Laps
Pos	Class	No	Team	Drivers	Engine	Tyre	Laps
1	**GT3; Pro**	**16**	**(Germany) Audi Sport Performance Team**	**(Germany) Frank Stippler (Germany) René Rast (Italy) Andrea Piccini**	**Audi R8 LMS Ultra**	M	**509**
1	**GT3; Pro**	**16**	**(Germany) Audi Sport Performance Team**	**(Germany) Frank Stippler (Germany) René Rast (Italy) Andrea Piccini**	**Audi 5.2 L V10**	M	**509**
2	GT3; Pro	1	(Belgium) Belgian Audi Club Team WRT	(Monaco) Stéphane Ortelli (Germany) Christopher Mies (Germany) Christopher Haase	Audi R8 LMS Ultra	M	508
2	GT3; Pro	1	(Belgium) Belgian Audi Club Team WRT	(Monaco) Stéphane Ortelli (Germany) Christopher Mies (Germany) Christopher Haase	Audi 5.2 L V10	M	508
3	GT3; Pro	66	(Germany) BMW/Vita4One Racing Team	(Germany) Frank Kechele (Belgium) Greg Franchi (Austria) Mathias Lauda	BMW Z4 GT3	M	508
3	GT3; Pro	66	(Germany) BMW/Vita4One Racing Team	(Germany) Frank Kechele (Belgium) Greg Franchi (Austria) Mathias Lauda	BMW 4.4 L V8	M	508
4	GT3; Pro	3	(Belgium) Marc VDS Racing Team	(Belgium) Maxime Martin (Belgium) Bas Leinders (Finland) Markus Palttala	BMW Z4 GT3	M	507
4	GT3; Pro	3	(Belgium) Marc VDS Racing Team	(Belgium) Maxime Martin (Belgium) Bas Leinders (Finland) Markus Palttala	BMW 4.4 L V8	M	507
5	**GT3; Pro-Am**	**52**	**(Italy) AF Corse**	**(Italy) Andrea Bertolini (Italy) Alessandro Pier Guidi (Belgium) Louis Machiels (Netherlands) Niek Hommerson**	**Ferrari 458 Italia GT3**	M	**502**
5	**GT3; Pro-Am**	**52**	**(Italy) AF Corse**	**(Italy) Andrea Bertolini (Italy) Alessandro Pier Guidi (Belgium) Louis Machiels (Netherlands) Niek Hommerson**	Ferrari 4.5 L V8	M	**502**
6	GT3; Pro	6	(Germany) Audi Sport Team Phoenix	(Germany) André Lotterer (Denmark) Tom Kristensen (Switzerland) Marcel Fässler	Audi R8 LMS Ultra	M	501
6	GT3; Pro	6	(Germany) Audi Sport Team Phoenix	(Germany) André Lotterer (Denmark) Tom Kristensen (Switzerland) Marcel Fässler	Audi 5.2 L V10	M	501
7	GT3; Pro-Am	8	(Germany) Haribo Racing Team	(Germany) Uwe Alzen (Germany) Christian Menzel (Germany) Mike Stursberg (Germany) Hans Guido Riegel	Porsche 997 GT3-R	M	497
7	GT3; Pro-Am	8	(Germany) Haribo Racing Team	(Germany) Uwe Alzen (Germany) Christian Menzel (Germany) Mike Stursberg (Germany) Hans Guido Riegel	Porsche 4.0 L Flat-6	M	497
8	GT3; Pro-Am	10	(France) SOFREV Auto Sport Promotion	(France) Olivier Panis (France) Fabien Barthez (France) Eric Debard (France) Morgan Moulin-Traffort	Ferrari 458 Italia GT3	M	497
8	GT3; Pro-Am	10	(France) SOFREV Auto Sport Promotion	(France) Olivier Panis (France) Fabien Barthez (France) Eric Debard (France) Morgan Moulin-Traffort	Ferrari 4.5 L V8	M	497
9	GT3; Pro-Am	88	(United Kingdom) Von Ryan Racing	(Portugal) Álvaro Parente (New Zealand) Roger Wills (United Kingdom) Chris Goodwin (United Kingdom) Rob Barff	McLaren MP4-12C GT3	M	497
9	GT3; Pro-Am	88	(United Kingdom) Von Ryan Racing	(Portugal) Álvaro Parente (New Zealand) Roger Wills (United Kingdom) Chris Goodwin (United Kingdom) Rob Barff	McLaren 3.8 L Turbo V8	M	497
10	GT3; Pro-Am	20	(France) SOFREV Auto Sport Promotion	(France) Ludovic Badey (France) Jean-Luc Beaubelique (France) Patrice Goueslard (France) Tristan Vautier	Ferrari 458 Italia GT3	M	495
10	GT3; Pro-Am	20	(France) SOFREV Auto Sport Promotion	(France) Ludovic Badey (France) Jean-Luc Beaubelique (France) Patrice Goueslard (France) Tristan Vautier	Ferrari 4.5 L V8	M	495
11	GT3; Pro-Am	24	(Germany) Blancpain Reiter	(Netherlands) Peter Kox (Switzerland) Marc Hayek (Germany) Albert von Thurn und Taxis (Netherlands) Jos Menten	Lamborghini Gallardo LP600+ GT3	M	486
11	GT3; Pro-Am	24	(Germany) Blancpain Reiter	(Netherlands) Peter Kox (Switzerland) Marc Hayek (Germany) Albert von Thurn und Taxis (Netherlands) Jos Menten	Lamborghini 5.2 L V10	M	486
12	GT3; Pro-Am	17	(Denmark) Insight Racing	(Denmark) Martin Jensen (Denmark) Dennis Andersen (United Kingdom) Iain Dockerill	Ferrari 458 Italia GT3	M	486
12	GT3; Pro-Am	17	(Denmark) Insight Racing	(Denmark) Martin Jensen (Denmark) Dennis Andersen (United Kingdom) Iain Dockerill	Ferrari 4.5 L V8	M	486
13	GT3; Pro-Am	74	(Belgium) Prospeed Competition	(Belgium) Maxime Soulet (Belgium) Dylan Derdaele (Netherlands) Paul van Splunteren (Belgium) Frédéric Bouvy	Porsche 997 GT3-R	M	485
13	GT3; Pro-Am	74	(Belgium) Prospeed Competition	(Belgium) Maxime Soulet (Belgium) Dylan Derdaele (Netherlands) Paul van Splunteren (Belgium) Frédéric Bouvy	Porsche 4.0 L Flat-6	M	485
14	GT3; Pro-Am	30	(United Kingdom) GT3 Racing	(United Kingdom) Peter Belshaw (United Kingdom) Craig Wilkins (United Kingdom) Aaron Scott (United Kingdom) Phil Keen	Audi R8 LMS	M	484
14	GT3; Pro-Am	30	(United Kingdom) GT3 Racing	(United Kingdom) Peter Belshaw (United Kingdom) Craig Wilkins (United Kingdom) Aaron Scott (United Kingdom) Phil Keen	Audi 5.2 L V10	M	484
15	GT3; Pro	4	(Belgium) Marc VDS Racing Team	(Netherlands) Mike Hezemans (Belgium) Bert Longin (Switzerland) Henri Moser	BMW Z4 GT3	M	478
15	GT3; Pro	4	(Belgium) Marc VDS Racing Team	(Netherlands) Mike Hezemans (Belgium) Bert Longin (Switzerland) Henri Moser	BMW 4.4 L V8	M	478
16	GT3; Pro-Am	89	(Belgium) GPR AMR	(Belgium) Bertrand Baguette (Belgium) Ronnie Lattine (Belgium) Tim Verbergt (Belgium) Damien Dupont	Aston Martin V12 Vantage GT3	M	477
16	GT3; Pro-Am	89	(Belgium) GPR AMR	(Belgium) Bertrand Baguette (Belgium) Ronnie Lattine (Belgium) Tim Verbergt (Belgium) Damien Dupont	Aston Martin 6.0 L V12	M	477
17	**Gentleman; Trophy**	**25**	**(Belgium) First Motorsport**	**(Belgium) Bert Redant (Belgium) Armand Fumal (Belgium) Steve van Bellingen (Belgium) Johan Vanloo**	**Porsche 997 GT3 Cup S**	M	**475**
17	**Gentleman; Trophy**	**25**	**(Belgium) First Motorsport**	**(Belgium) Bert Redant (Belgium) Armand Fumal (Belgium) Steve van Bellingen (Belgium) Johan Vanloo**	Porsche 3.6 L Flat-6	M	**475**
18	GT3; Pro-Am	49	(Italy) AF Corse	(France) Yannick Mallégol (United States) Howard Blank (France) Jean-Marc Bachelier (France) François Perrodo	Ferrari 458 Italia GT3	M	475
18	GT3; Pro-Am	49	(Italy) AF Corse	(France) Yannick Mallégol (United States) Howard Blank (France) Jean-Marc Bachelier (France) François Perrodo	Ferrari 4.5 L V8	M	475
19	GT3; Pro-Am	19	(Germany) Black Falcon	(Germany) Kenneth Heyer (United Kingdom) Oliver Morley (Germany) Manuel Metzger (Germany) Stephan Rosler	Mercedes-Benz SLS AMG GT3	M	473
19	GT3; Pro-Am	19	(Germany) Black Falcon	(Germany) Kenneth Heyer (United Kingdom) Oliver Morley (Germany) Manuel Metzger (Germany) Stephan Rosler	Mercedes-Benz 6.2 L V8	M	473
20	GT3; Pro	75	(Belgium) Prospeed Competition	(Belgium) Marc Goossens (Netherlands) Xavier Maassen (Germany) Marc Hennerici	Porsche 997 GT3-R	M	471
20	GT3; Pro	75	(Belgium) Prospeed Competition	(Belgium) Marc Goossens (Netherlands) Xavier Maassen (Germany) Marc Hennerici	Porsche 4.0 L Flat-6	M	471
21	GT3; Pro-Am	34	(France) Pro GT by Alméras	(France) Anthony Beltoise (France) Roland Berville (France) Henry Hassid (France) Nicolas Armindo	Porsche 997 GT3-R	M	471
21	GT3; Pro-Am	34	(France) Pro GT by Alméras	(France) Anthony Beltoise (France) Roland Berville (France) Henry Hassid (France) Nicolas Armindo	Porsche 4.0 L Flat-6	M	471
22	Gentleman; Trophy	82	(France) Bull Fight Racing/GCR	(France) Pierre Fontaine (France) Gaël Lesoudier (France) Christophe Decultot (France) Gilles Vannelet	Dodge Viper Competition Coupe	M	462
22	Gentleman; Trophy	82	(France) Bull Fight Racing/GCR	(France) Pierre Fontaine (France) Gaël Lesoudier (France) Christophe Decultot (France) Gilles Vannelet	Dodge 8.3 L V10	M	462
23	Gentleman; Trophy	41	(France) Saintéloc Racing	(United Kingdom) Robert Hissom (Switzerland) Pierre Hirschi (France) Philippe Marie (France) Jérôme Demay	Audi R8 LMS	M	460
23	Gentleman; Trophy	41	(France) Saintéloc Racing	(United Kingdom) Robert Hissom (Switzerland) Pierre Hirschi (France) Philippe Marie (France) Jérôme Demay	Audi 5.2 L V10	M	460
24	Gentleman; Trophy	81	(Sweden) ALFAB Racing	(Sweden) Erik Behrens (Sweden) Daniel Roos (Sweden) Patrik Skoog (Sweden) Magnus Ohman	Audi R8 LMS	M	455
24	Gentleman; Trophy	81	(Sweden) ALFAB Racing	(Sweden) Erik Behrens (Sweden) Daniel Roos (Sweden) Patrik Skoog (Sweden) Magnus Ohman	Audi 5.2 L V10	M	455
25	**Cup**	**94**	**(Belgium) SpeedLover**	**(Belgium) Kevin Balthazard (Belgium) Christophe Bigourie (Belgium) Raf Vleugels (Belgium) Rik Renmans**	**Porsche 997 GT3 Cup**	M	**455**
25	**Cup**	**94**	**(Belgium) SpeedLover**	**(Belgium) Kevin Balthazard (Belgium) Christophe Bigourie (Belgium) Raf Vleugels (Belgium) Rik Renmans**	Porsche 3.8 L Flat-6	M	**455**
26 DNF	GT3; Pro-Am	51	(Italy) AF Corse	(United Kingdom) Dan Brown (Italy) Giuseppe Cirò (Venezuela) Gaetano Ardagna Pérez (Finland) Toni Vilander	Ferrari 458 Italia GT3	M	449
26 DNF	GT3; Pro-Am	51	(Italy) AF Corse	(United Kingdom) Dan Brown (Italy) Giuseppe Cirò (Venezuela) Gaetano Ardagna Pérez (Finland) Toni Vilander	Ferrari 4.5 L V8	M	449
27 DNF	GT3; Pro-Am	72	(Switzerland) Kessel Racing	(Italy) Lorenzo Bontempelli (France) Pierre Bruneau (France) Marc Rostan (France) Claude-Yves Gosselin	Ferrari 458 Italia GT3	M	449
27 DNF	GT3; Pro-Am	72	(Switzerland) Kessel Racing	(Italy) Lorenzo Bontempelli (France) Pierre Bruneau (France) Marc Rostan (France) Claude-Yves Gosselin	Ferrari 4.5 L V8	M	449
28	GT3; Pro-Am	42	(France) Sport Garage	(France) Romain Brandela (France) Lionel Comole (France) Michaël Petit (France) Kevin Despinasse	Ferrari 458 Italia GT3	M	448
28	GT3; Pro-Am	42	(France) Sport Garage	(France) Romain Brandela (France) Lionel Comole (France) Michaël Petit (France) Kevin Despinasse	Ferrari 4.5 L V8	M	448
29	GT3; Pro-Am	50	(Italy) AF Corse	(Italy) Marco Cioci (South Africa) Jack Gerber (Italy) Raffaele Giammaria (Belgium) Enzo Ide	Ferrari 458 Italia GT3	M	447
29	GT3; Pro-Am	50	(Italy) AF Corse	(Italy) Marco Cioci (South Africa) Jack Gerber (Italy) Raffaele Giammaria (Belgium) Enzo Ide	Ferrari 4.5 L V8	M	447
30	GT3; Pro-Am	60	(United Kingdom) Von Ryan Racing	(United Kingdom) Julien Draper (United Kingdom) Matthew Draper (United Kingdom) Stephen Jelley (Netherlands) Stef Dusseldorp	McLaren MP4-12C GT3	M	434
30	GT3; Pro-Am	60	(United Kingdom) Von Ryan Racing	(United Kingdom) Julien Draper (United Kingdom) Matthew Draper (United Kingdom) Stephen Jelley (Netherlands) Stef Dusseldorp	McLaren 3.8 L Turbo V8	M	434
31 DNF	GT3; Pro	2	(Belgium) Belgian Audi Club Team WRT	(Sweden) Edward Sandström (Italy) Marco Bonanomi (Belgium) Laurens Vanthoor	Audi R8 LMS Ultra	M	417
31 DNF	GT3; Pro	2	(Belgium) Belgian Audi Club Team WRT	(Sweden) Edward Sandström (Italy) Marco Bonanomi (Belgium) Laurens Vanthoor	Audi 5.2 L V10	M	417
32 DNF	GT3; Pro-Am	29	(Italy) ROAL Motorsport	(Netherlands) Tom Coronel (Italy) Stefano Colombo (Italy) Edoardo Liberati (Italy) Michela Cerruti	BMW Z4 GT3	M	400
32 DNF	GT3; Pro-Am	29	(Italy) ROAL Motorsport	(Netherlands) Tom Coronel (Italy) Stefano Colombo (Italy) Edoardo Liberati (Italy) Michela Cerruti	BMW 4.4 L V8	M	400
33	Gentleman; Trophy	98	(Sweden) JB Motorsport	(Sweden) Jan Brunstedt (Sweden) Mikael Bender (Sweden) Jocke Mangs	Audi R8 LMS	M	363
33	Gentleman; Trophy	98	(Sweden) JB Motorsport	(Sweden) Jan Brunstedt (Sweden) Mikael Bender (Sweden) Jocke Mangs	Audi 5.2 L V10	M	363
34 DNF	GT3; Pro	71	(Switzerland) Kessel Racing	(Italy) Daniel Zampieri (Italy) Davide Rigon (Italy) Stefano Gattuso	Ferrari 458 Italia GT3	M	354
34 DNF	GT3; Pro	71	(Switzerland) Kessel Racing	(Italy) Daniel Zampieri (Italy) Davide Rigon (Italy) Stefano Gattuso	Ferrari 4.5 L V8	M	354
35 DNF	GT3; Pro-Am	107	(United Kingdom) Beechdean-Aston Martin Racing	(United Kingdom) Jonathan Adam (United Kingdom) John Gaw (United Kingdom) Andrew Howard (United Kingdom) Phil Dryburgh	Aston Martin V12 Vantage GT3	M	342
35 DNF	GT3; Pro-Am	107	(United Kingdom) Beechdean-Aston Martin Racing	(United Kingdom) Jonathan Adam (United Kingdom) John Gaw (United Kingdom) Andrew Howard (United Kingdom) Phil Dryburgh	Aston Martin 6.0 L V12	M	342
36 DNF	Gentleman; Trophy	58	(France) Exagon Engineering	(Belgium) Christian Kelders (France) Jean-Luc Blanchemain (France) Daniel Desbrueres (France) Pascal Mulle	Porsche 997 GT3-R	M	342
36 DNF	Gentleman; Trophy	58	(France) Exagon Engineering	(Belgium) Christian Kelders (France) Jean-Luc Blanchemain (France) Daniel Desbrueres (France) Pascal Mulle	Porsche 4.0 L Flat-6	M	342
37 DNF	GT3; Pro-Am	57	Vita4One Team Italy	(Italy) Alessandro Bonacini (Italy) Eugenio Amos (Italy) Giacomo Petrobelli (Switzerland) Jonathan Hirschi	Ferrari 458 Italia GT3	M	338
37 DNF	GT3; Pro-Am	57	Vita4One Team Italy	(Italy) Alessandro Bonacini (Italy) Eugenio Amos (Italy) Giacomo Petrobelli (Switzerland) Jonathan Hirschi	Ferrari 4.5 L V8	M	338
38 NC	Gentleman; Trophy	57	(Belgium) VDS Racing Adventures	(Belgium) Raphaël van de Straten (Belgium) Nicolas de Crem (Belgium) José Close (Belgium) Benjamin Bailly	Ford Mustang FR500 GT3	M	334
38 NC	Gentleman; Trophy	57	(Belgium) VDS Racing Adventures	(Belgium) Raphaël van de Straten (Belgium) Nicolas de Crem (Belgium) José Close (Belgium) Benjamin Bailly	Ford 5.0 L V8	M	334
39 DNF	GT3; Pro-Am	7	(Slovakia) ARC Bratislava	(Slovakia) Miro Konôpka (Slovakia) Zdeno Mikulasko (Italy) Steffano Crotti (Belgium) Christoff Corten	Porsche 997 GT3-R	M	305
39 DNF	GT3; Pro-Am	7	(Slovakia) ARC Bratislava	(Slovakia) Miro Konôpka (Slovakia) Zdeno Mikulasko (Italy) Steffano Crotti (Belgium) Christoff Corten	Porsche 4.0 L Flat-6	M	305
40 DNF	GT3; Pro	36	(Netherlands) DB Motorsport	(Belgium) Stéphane Lémeret (Netherlands) Jeffrey van Hooydonk (Netherlands) Jeroen den Boer	BMW Z4 GT3	M	271
40 DNF	GT3; Pro	36	(Netherlands) DB Motorsport	(Belgium) Stéphane Lémeret (Netherlands) Jeffrey van Hooydonk (Netherlands) Jeroen den Boer	BMW 4.4 L V8	M	271
41 DNF	GT3; Pro	41	(France) Saintéloc Racing	(France) Dino Lunardi (France) Grégory Guilvert (Portugal) Filipe Albuquerque	Audi R8 LMS Ultra	M	267
41 DNF	GT3; Pro	41	(France) Saintéloc Racing	(France) Dino Lunardi (France) Grégory Guilvert (Portugal) Filipe Albuquerque	Audi 5.2 L V10	M	267
42 DNF	GT3; Pro	83	(France) SMG Challenge	(France) Philippe Gache (France) Eric Clément (France) Olivier Pla	Porsche 997 GT3-R	M	262
42 DNF	GT3; Pro	83	(France) SMG Challenge	(France) Philippe Gache (France) Eric Clément (France) Olivier Pla	Porsche 4.0 L Flat-6	M	262
43 DNF	GT3; Pro-Am	21	(United Kingdom) MTech	(Republic of Ireland) Matt Griffin (Italy) Niki Cadei (United Kingdom) Mike Edmonds (United Kingdom) Duncan Cameron	Ferrari 458 Italia GT3	M	257
43 DNF	GT3; Pro-Am	21	(United Kingdom) MTech	(Republic of Ireland) Matt Griffin (Italy) Niki Cadei (United Kingdom) Mike Edmonds (United Kingdom) Duncan Cameron	Ferrari 4.5 L V8	M	257
44 DNF	GT3; Pro	69	(United Kingdom) Gulf Racing UK	(United Kingdom) Jamie Campbell-Walter (Germany) Roald Goethe (United Kingdom) Stuart Hall	McLaren MP4-12C GT3	M	216
44 DNF	GT3; Pro	69	(United Kingdom) Gulf Racing UK	(United Kingdom) Jamie Campbell-Walter (Germany) Roald Goethe (United Kingdom) Stuart Hall	McLaren 3.8 L Turbo V8	M	216
45 DNF	GT3; Pro	9	(United Kingdom) Gulf Racing UK	(United Kingdom) Rob Bell (United Kingdom) Michael Wainwright (United Kingdom) Andy Meyrick	McLaren MP4-12C GT3	M	203
45 DNF	GT3; Pro	9	(United Kingdom) Gulf Racing UK	(United Kingdom) Rob Bell (United Kingdom) Michael Wainwright (United Kingdom) Andy Meyrick	McLaren 3.8 L Turbo V8	M	203
46 DNF	GT3; Pro-Am	14	(Belgium) KRK Racing	(Belgium) Koen Wauters (Belgium) Anthony Kumpen (Belgium) Raf Vanthoor (Netherlands) Dennis Retera	Mercedes-Benz SLS AMG GT3	M	190
46 DNF	GT3; Pro-Am	14	(Belgium) KRK Racing	(Belgium) Koen Wauters (Belgium) Anthony Kumpen (Belgium) Raf Vanthoor (Netherlands) Dennis Retera	Mercedes-Benz 6.2 L V8	M	190
47 DNF	GT3; Pro-Am	47	(Portugal) ASM Team	(Portugal) Pedro Lamy (Portugal) Ricardo Bravo (Portugal) Luís Silva (Saudi Arabia) Karim Ojjeh	McLaren MP4-12C GT3	M	190
47 DNF	GT3; Pro-Am	47	(Portugal) ASM Team	(Portugal) Pedro Lamy (Portugal) Ricardo Bravo (Portugal) Luís Silva (Saudi Arabia) Karim Ojjeh	McLaren 3.8 L Turbo V8	M	190
48 DNF	GT3; Pro-Am	23	(United States) United Autosports	(United Kingdom) Mark Blundell (United States) Mark Patterson (Hong Kong) Alain Li (United Kingdom) Richard Meins	Audi R8 LMS Ultra	M	187
48 DNF	GT3; Pro-Am	23	(United States) United Autosports	(United Kingdom) Mark Blundell (United States) Mark Patterson (Hong Kong) Alain Li (United Kingdom) Richard Meins	Audi 5.2 L V10	M	187
49 DNF	Cup	76	(Netherlands) Race Art	(Belgium) Philippe Broodcoren (Belgium) Christophe Geoffroy (Netherlands) Mathijs Harkema (France) Henri Richard	Porsche 997 GT3 Cup	M	181
49 DNF	Cup	76	(Netherlands) Race Art	(Belgium) Philippe Broodcoren (Belgium) Christophe Geoffroy (Netherlands) Mathijs Harkema (France) Henri Richard	Porsche 3.8 L Flat-6	M	181
50 DNF	GT3; Pro-Am	44	(France) Sport Garage	(France) Gilles Duqueine (France) Christian Beroujon (France) André-Alain Corbel (France) Eric Vaissiere	Ferrari 458 Italia GT3	M	164
50 DNF	GT3; Pro-Am	44	(France) Sport Garage	(France) Gilles Duqueine (France) Christian Beroujon (France) André-Alain Corbel (France) Eric Vaissiere	Ferrari 4.5 L V8	M	164
51 DNF	Cup	32	(France) Pro GT by Alméras	(France) Jean-Louis Alloin (France) Jérémy Alloin (France) Matthieu Vaxivière (France) Alain Ferté	Porsche 997 GT3 Cup	M	163
51 DNF	Cup	32	(France) Pro GT by Alméras	(France) Jean-Louis Alloin (France) Jérémy Alloin (France) Matthieu Vaxivière (France) Alain Ferté	Porsche 3.8 L Flat-6	M	163
52 DNF	GT3; Pro-Am	59	Vita4One Team Italy	(Italy) Alessandro Bonetti (Italy) Andrea Ceccato (United Kingdom) Michael Lyons (Czech Republic) Filip Salaquarda	Ferrari 458 Italia GT3	M	158
52 DNF	GT3; Pro-Am	59	Vita4One Team Italy	(Italy) Alessandro Bonetti (Italy) Andrea Ceccato (United Kingdom) Michael Lyons (Czech Republic) Filip Salaquarda	Ferrari 4.5 L V8	M	158
53 DNF	GT3; Pro-Am	70	(Netherlands) Race Art	(Netherlands) Nick Catsburg (Netherlands) Roger Grouwels (Netherlands) Jaap van Lagen (United Kingdom) Robert Nearn	BMW Z4 GT3	M	136
53 DNF	GT3; Pro-Am	70	(Netherlands) Race Art	(Netherlands) Nick Catsburg (Netherlands) Roger Grouwels (Netherlands) Jaap van Lagen (United Kingdom) Robert Nearn	BMW 4.4 L V8	M	136
54 DNF	GT3; Pro-Am	18	(Germany) Black Falcon	(Netherlands) Jeroen Bleekemolen (Luxembourg) Steve Jans (United States) Bret Curtis (China) Franky Cheng	Mercedes-Benz SLS AMG GT3	M	125
54 DNF	GT3; Pro-Am	18	(Germany) Black Falcon	(Netherlands) Jeroen Bleekemolen (Luxembourg) Steve Jans (United States) Bret Curtis (China) Franky Cheng	Mercedes-Benz 6.2 L V8	M	125
55 DNF	GT3; Pro-Am	5	(Belgium) Boutsen Ginion Racing	(Belgium) Nico Verdonck (Belgium) Edouard Mondron (Belgium) Eric van de Poele (United Kingdom) Jack Clarke	McLaren MP4-12C GT3	M	124
55 DNF	GT3; Pro-Am	5	(Belgium) Boutsen Ginion Racing	(Belgium) Nico Verdonck (Belgium) Edouard Mondron (Belgium) Eric van de Poele (United Kingdom) Jack Clarke	McLaren 3.8 L Turbo V8	M	124
56 DNF	Gentleman; Trophy	73	(Switzerland) Kessel Racing	(Switzerland) Beniamino Caccia (Venezuela) Paolo Andreasi (Argentina) Pablo Paladino (Italy) Giacomo Piccini	Ferrari 430 Scuderia GT3	M	123
56 DNF	Gentleman; Trophy	73	(Switzerland) Kessel Racing	(Switzerland) Beniamino Caccia (Venezuela) Paolo Andreasi (Argentina) Pablo Paladino (Italy) Giacomo Piccini	Ferrari 4.5 L V8	M	123
57 DNF	GT3; Pro-Am	15	(Belgium) Boutsen Ginion Racing	(Belgium) Jérôme Thiry (Belgium) Sarah Bovy (Italy) Massimo Vagliani (France) Marlene Broggi	McLaren MP4-12C GT3	M	96
57 DNF	GT3; Pro-Am	15	(Belgium) Boutsen Ginion Racing	(Belgium) Jérôme Thiry (Belgium) Sarah Bovy (Italy) Massimo Vagliani (France) Marlene Broggi	McLaren 3.8 L Turbo V8	M	96
58 DNF	GT3; Pro-Am	62	(Germany) Lapidus Racing	(Germany) Klaas Hummel (United Kingdom) Adam Christodoulou (United Kingdom) Phil Quaife (United Kingdom) Tim Mullen	McLaren MP4-12C GT3	M	96
58 DNF	GT3; Pro-Am	62	(Germany) Lapidus Racing	(Germany) Klaas Hummel (United Kingdom) Adam Christodoulou (United Kingdom) Phil Quaife (United Kingdom) Tim Mullen	McLaren 3.8 L Turbo V8	M	96
59 DNF	GT3; Pro-Am	12	(France) ART Grand Prix	(United Kingdom) Duncan Tappy (France) Grégoire Demoustier (France) Mike Parisy (France) Ulric Amado	McLaren MP4-12C GT3	M	95
59 DNF	GT3; Pro-Am	12	(France) ART Grand Prix	(United Kingdom) Duncan Tappy (France) Grégoire Demoustier (France) Mike Parisy (France) Ulric Amado	McLaren 3.8 L Turbo V8	M	95
60 DNF	GT3; Pro-Am	90	(United Kingdom) Preci-Spark	(United Kingdom) David Jones (United Kingdom) Godfrey Jones (United Kingdom) Mike Jordan (Germany) Bernd Schneider	Mercedes-Benz SLS AMG GT3	M	73
60 DNF	GT3; Pro-Am	90	(United Kingdom) Preci-Spark	(United Kingdom) David Jones (United Kingdom) Godfrey Jones (United Kingdom) Mike Jordan (Germany) Bernd Schneider	Mercedes-Benz 6.2 L V8	M	73
61 DNF	Cup	86	(France) RMS	(France) Philippe Salini (France) Thierry Stépec (France) Éric Mouez (France) David Loger	Porsche 997 GT3 Cup	M	63
61 DNF	Cup	86	(France) RMS	(France) Philippe Salini (France) Thierry Stépec (France) Éric Mouez (France) David Loger	Porsche 3.8 L Flat-6	M	63
62 DNF	GT3; Pro-Am	35	(United Kingdom) GT Academy Team RJN	(United Kingdom) Chris Ward (United Kingdom) Alex Buncombe (United Kingdom) Jann Mardenborough (Spain) Lucas Ordoñez	Nissan GT-R GT3	M	53
62 DNF	GT3; Pro-Am	35	(United Kingdom) GT Academy Team RJN	(United Kingdom) Chris Ward (United Kingdom) Alex Buncombe (United Kingdom) Jann Mardenborough (Spain) Lucas Ordoñez	Nissan 3.8 L Turbo V6	M	53
63 DNF	GT3; Pro-Am	37	(Netherlands) DB Motorsport	(Netherlands) Jochen Habets (Netherlands) Leon Rijnbeek (Netherlands) Simon Knap (Canada) Andrew Danyliw	BMW Z4 GT3	M	52
63 DNF	GT3; Pro-Am	37	(Netherlands) DB Motorsport	(Netherlands) Jochen Habets (Netherlands) Leon Rijnbeek (Netherlands) Simon Knap (Canada) Andrew Danyliw	BMW 4.4 L V8	M	52
64 DNF	GT3; Pro-Am	80	(Switzerland) Emil Frey Racing	(Switzerland) Lorenz Frey (Switzerland) Rolf Maritz (Switzerland) Gabriele Gardel (Switzerland) Fredy Barth	Jaguar XKR	M	52
64 DNF	GT3; Pro-Am	80	(Switzerland) Emil Frey Racing	(Switzerland) Lorenz Frey (Switzerland) Rolf Maritz (Switzerland) Gabriele Gardel (Switzerland) Fredy Barth	Jaguar 5.0 L V8	M	52
65 DNF	GT3; Pro-Am	33	(France) Pro GT by Alméras	(France) Jean-Antoine Leclerc (France) Éric Dermont (France) David Tuchbant (France) Franck Perera	Porsche 997 GT3-R	M	39
65 DNF	GT3; Pro-Am	33	(France) Pro GT by Alméras	(France) Jean-Antoine Leclerc (France) Éric Dermont (France) David Tuchbant (France) Franck Perera	Porsche 4.0 L Flat-6	M	39
66 DNF	Cup	87	(France) RMS	(Switzerland) Manuel Nicolaidis (Switzerland) Fabio Spirgi (France) Olivier Baron (Switzerland) Richard Feller	Porsche 997 GT3 Cup	M	34
66 DNF	Cup	87	(France) RMS	(Switzerland) Manuel Nicolaidis (Switzerland) Fabio Spirgi (France) Olivier Baron (Switzerland) Richard Feller	Porsche 3.8 L Flat-6	M	34
