= Rob Bell (racing driver) =

British professional racing driver

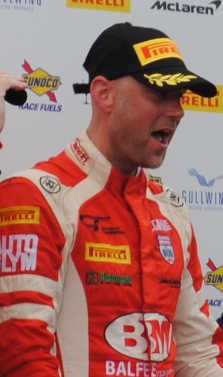
- Bell on the podium at Donington Park
- Nationality: British
- Born: Robert Bell; 30 April 1979 (age 47) Newcastle upon Tyne, England, United Kingdom
- Relatives: Matt Bell (brother)

British GT Championship career
- Debut season: 2018
- Current team: Balfe Motorsport
- Categorisation: FIA Platinum
- Car number: 22
- Starts: 12
- Wins: 1
- Poles: 2
- Best finish: 3rd in 2019

Previous series
- 2017: International GT Open

Championship titles
- 2001 2002 2007 2008: Formula Renault UK (Winter); Formula Renault UK (Winter); Le Mans Series (GT2 class); Le Mans Series (GT2 class)
24 Hours of Le Mans career
- Years: 2007–2011, 2013, 2015–
- Teams: Team LNT; Virgo Motorsport; JMW Motorsport
- Best finish: 23rd (2007, 2009)
- Class wins: 0

Robert Bell (born 30 April 1979 in Newcastle upon Tyne) is a British former professional racing driver. He has competed in such series as the FIA GT Championship, the British GT Championship and Formula Renault V6 Eurocup, and is best known as the winner of the 2016 Blancpain Endurance Series with Shane van Gisbergen and Côme Ledogar. He has also won the Winter Series of Formula Renault UK in both 2001 and 2002.

Bell was the Le Mans Series GT2 class champion for Virgo Motorsport in the 2007 and 2008 seasons, and vice-champion for JMW in 2009 and 2011. In 2009, he also finished seventh at the FIA GT Championship GT2 class for CRS Racing, collecting a second place at the 24 Hours of Spa. Since 2012, Bell has competed at the Blancpain Endurance Series Pro Cup class with a McLaren MP4-12C for Gulf Racing UK.

Bell also finished second in the GT class at the 2011 24 Hours of Daytona as a Paul Miller Racing driver. He returned to the team for the 2012 12 Hours of Sebring, resulting fifth in the GT class.

Bell competed in the 2019 British GT alongside Shaun Balfe in a McLaren 720S GT3. He finished third in the GT3 standings after winning at the final round at Donington Park. In 2021 Bell also set the fastest time at the Goodwood Festival of Speed shootout with his McLaren 720S GT3X recording a time of 45.01 seconds.

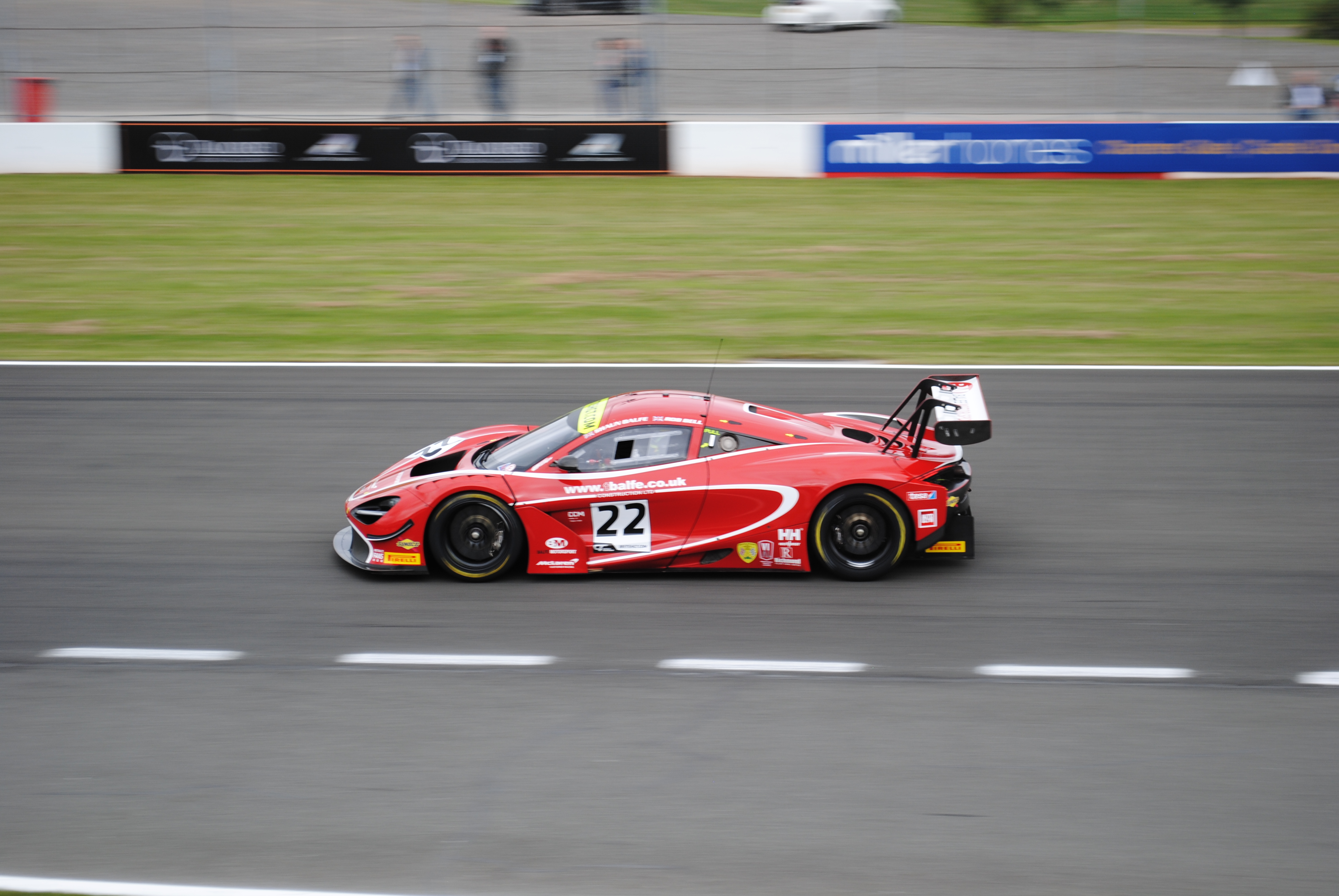
Bell at the wheel of a McLaren 720S GT3 in the lead of the race at Donington Park.

Bell's brother Matt also races internationally in GT3 and LM prototypes.

== Racing record ==
=== 24 Hours of Le Mans results ===
Year	Team	Co-Drivers	Car	Class	Laps	Pos.	Class Pos.
2007	(United Kingdom) Team LNT	(United Kingdom) Lawrence Tomlinson (United Kingdom) Richard Dean	Panoz Esperante GT-LM	GT2	308	22nd	5th
2008	(United Kingdom) Virgo Motorsport	(United Kingdom) Tim Mullen (United Kingdom) Tim Sugden	Ferrari F430 GT2	GT2	289	DNF	DNF
2009	(United Kingdom) JMW Motorsport	(United Kingdom) Andrew Kirkaldy (United Kingdom) Tim Sugden	Ferrari F430 GT2	GT2	320	23rd	4th
2010	(United Kingdom) JMW Motorsport	(United Kingdom) Tim Sugden (United States) Bryce Miller	Aston Martin V8 Vantage GT2	GT2	71	DNF	DNF
2011	(United Kingdom) JMW Motorsport	(United Kingdom) Tim Sugden (Netherlands) Xavier Maassen	Ferrari 458 Italia GTC	GTE; Pro	290	24th	9th
2013	(United Kingdom) Aston Martin Racing	(France) Frédéric Makowiecki (Brazil) Bruno Senna	Aston Martin V8 Vantage GT2	GTE; Pro	248	DNF	DNF
2015	(United Kingdom) Aston Martin Racing	(United Kingdom) Darren Turner (Germany) Stefan Mücke	Aston Martin Vantage GTE	GTE; Pro	110	DNF	DNF
2016	(Singapore) Clearwater Racing	(Japan) Keita Sawa (Malaysia) Weng Sun Mok	Ferrari 458 Italia GT2	GTE; Am	329	30th	4th
2017	(United Kingdom) TF Sport	(Turkey) Salih Yoluc (United Kingdom) Euan Hankey	Aston Martin Vantage GTE	GTE; Am	329	35th	7th

=== Complete British GT Championship results ===
(key) (Races in bold indicate pole position) (Races in italics indicate fastest lap)

Year	Team	Car	Class	1	2	3	4	5	6	7	8	9	10	11	12	13	Pos.	Points
2010	United Autosports	Ginetta G50	G4	OUL; 1	OUL; 2	KNO; 1	KNO; 2	SPA; 1	ROC; 1	ROC; 2	SIL; 1; 15	SNE; 1	SNE; 2	BRH; 1	BRH; 2	DON; 1	12th	20
2016	Black Bull Ecurie Ecosse	McLaren 650S GT3	GT3	BRH; 1; 7	ROC; 1; 7	OUL; 1; 8	OUL; 2; 2	SIL; 1; 4	SPA; 1 Ret	SNE; 1 Ret	SNE; 2 Ret	DON; 1; 1					7th	95.5
2018	Balfe Motorsport	McLaren 650S GT3	GT3	OUL; 1; 8	OUL; 2; 12	ROC; 1 Ret	SNE; 1	SNE; 2	SIL; 1; 8	SPA; 1 Ret	BRH; 1	DON; 1					17th	10
2019	Balfe Motorsport	McLaren 720S GT3	GT3	OUL; 1 WD	OUL; 2 WD	SNE; 1; 31	SNE; 2; 3	SIL; 1; 11	DON; 1; 2	SPA; 1; 4	**BRH**; **1**; 2	**DON**; **1**; 1					3rd	126
2020	Balfe Motorsport	McLaren 720S GT3	GT3	OUL; 1	OUL; 2	DON; 1	DON; 2	BRH; 1	DON; 1	SNE; 1	SNE; 2	SIL; 1 Ret					NC†	0†
2022	Fox Motorsport	McLaren 720S GT3	GT3	OUL; 1	OUL; 2	SIL; 1	DON; 1; 9	SNE; 1	SNE; 2	SPA; 1	BRH; 1	DON; 1					29th	3
2023	Optimum Motorsport	McLaren 720S GT3 Evo	GT3	OUL; 1; 7	OUL; 2; 10	SIL; 1; 3	DON; 1; 8	SNE; 1; 3	SNE; 2; 11	ALG; 1; 2	BRH; 1; 7	DON; 1					10th	86.5

† Not eligible for points.

=== Complete GT World Challenge Europe results ===
==== GT World Challenge Europe Endurance Cup ====
(key) (Races in bold indicate pole position) (Races in italics indicate fastest lap)

Year	Team	Car	Class	1	2	3	4	5	6	7	8	Pos.	Points
2011	McLaren GT	McLaren MP4-12C GT3	Pro	MNZ	NAV	SPA; 6H; Ret	SPA; 12H; Ret	SPA; 24H; Ret	MAG	SIL		NC	0
2012	Gulf Racing UK	McLaren MP4-12C GT3	Pro-Am	MNZ; 46†	SIL; 35	LEC; 21				NÜR; 31	NAV; 25	NC	0
2012	Gulf Racing UK	McLaren MP4-12C GT3	Pro				SPA; 6H; 15	SPA; 12H; 37	SPA; 24H; Ret			33rd	1
2013	Gulf Racing UK	McLaren MP4-12C GT3	Pro	MNZ; 3	SIL; 11	LEC; 10	SPA; 24H; 15	SPA; 24H; 8	SPA; 24H; 4	NÜR; Ret		14th	25
2014	Von Ryan Racing	McLaren MP4-12C GT3	Pro	MNZ	SIL	LEC	SPA; 6H; Ret	SPA; 12H; Ret	SPA; 24H; Ret	NÜR		NC	0
2015	Von Ryan Racing	McLaren 650S GT3	Pro	MNZ; 16	SIL; 1	LEC; Ret	SPA; 6H; 6	SPA; 12H; 13	SPA; 24H; 29	NÜR; 1		4th	54
2016	Garage 59	McLaren 650S GT3	Pro	MNZ; 1	SIL; 6	LEC; 1	SPA; 6H; 8	SPA; 12H; 39	SPA; 24H; 31	NÜR; 30		1st	68
2017	Strakka Racing	McLaren 650S GT3	Pro	MNZ; 9	SIL; 34	LEC; Ret	SPA; 6H; 60	SPA; 12H; 60	SPA; 24H; Ret	CAT		28th	2
2020	Optimum Motorsport	McLaren 720S GT3	Pro	IMO; 8	NÜR; 11	SPA; 6H; 51	SPA; 12H; 46	SPA; 24H; Ret	LEC			24th	5
2021	Jota Sport	McLaren 720S GT3	Pro	MNZ; Ret	LEC; 16	SPA; 6H; 4	SPA; 12H; 9	SPA; 24H; 7	NÜR; DNS	CAT; 13		18th	13
2022	Jota Sport	McLaren 720S GT3	Pro	IMO; 10	LEC; Ret	SPA; 6H; 9	SPA; 12H; 7	SPA; 24H; 8	HOC; Ret	CAT; 10		27th	10
2024	Optimum Motorsport	McLaren 720S GT3 Evo	Bronze	LEC; Ret	SPA; 6H; 25	SPA; 12H; 37	SPA; 24H; 21	NÜR	MNZ; 36	JED		25th	14

==== GT World Challenge Europe Sprint Cup ====
(key) (Races in bold indicate pole position) (Races in italics indicate fastest lap)

Year	Team	Car	Class	1	2	3	4	5	6	7	8	9	10	11	12	13	14	Pos.	Points
2013	Hexis Racing	McLaren MP4-12C GT3	Pro	NOG; QR	NOG; CR	ZOL; QR	ZOL; CR	ZAN; QR	ZAN; CR	SVK; QR	SVK; CR	NAV; QR	NAV; CR	BAK; QR; 3	BAK; CR; 3			NC‡	0‡
2014	Boutsen Ginion	McLaren MP4-12C GT3	Pro	NOG; QR	NOG; CR	BRH; QR	BRH; CR	ZAN; QR	ZAN; CR	SVK; QR	SVK; CR	ALG; QR	ALG; CR	ZOL; QR	ZOL; CR	BAK; QR; 21	BAK; CR; 18	NC‡	0‡
2015	Attempto Racing	McLaren 650S GT3	Pro	NOG; QR; 12	NOG; CR; 13	BRH; QR; 5	BRH; CR; 3	ZOL; QR; Ret	ZOL; CR; Ret	MOS; QR; 6	MOS; CR; 9	ALG; QR	ALG; CR	MIS; QR	MIS; CR	ZAN; QR	ZAN; CR	16th	22
2016	Garage 59	McLaren 650S GT3	Pro	MIS; QR; 9	MIS; CR; 4	BRH; QR; 8	BRH; CR; 4	**NÜR**; **QR**; 2	NÜR; CR; 1	HUN; QR; 17	HUN; CR; 17	CAT; QR; 16	CAT; CR; 13					6th	56
2017	Strakka Racing	McLaren 650S GT3	Pro	MIS; QR; 18	MIS; CR; 8	BRH; QR; 15	BRH; CR; 21	ZOL; QR; 22	ZOL; CR; 11	HUN; QR; 24	HUN; CR; 17	NÜR; QR; 16	NÜR; CR; 9					21st	6
2022	Jota Sport	McLaren 720S GT3	Pro	BRH; 1; 12	BRH; 2; 10	MAG; 1	MAG; 2	ZAN; 1	ZAN; 2	MIS; 1	MIS; 2	VAL; 1	VAL; 2					23rd	0.5

‡ — Guest driver – Not eligible for points.

=== Complete FIA World Endurance Championship results ===
(key) (Races in bold indicate pole position) (Races in italics indicate fastest lap)

Year	Entrant	Class	Car	Engine	1	2	3	4	5	6	7	8	Rank	Points
2013	Aston Martin Racing	LMGTE Pro	Aston Martin Vantage GTE	Aston Martin 4.5 L V8	SIL	**SPA**; 2	**LMS**; Ret	SÃO; Ret	COA	FUJ	SHA	BHR	24th	19
2015	Aston Martin Racing	LMGTE Pro	Aston Martin Vantage GTE	Aston Martin 4.5 L V8	SIL	SPA; 5	LMS; Ret	NÜR	COA	FUJ	SHA	BHR	24th	10

=== Complete IMSA SportsCar Championship results ===
(key) (Races in bold indicate pole position) (Races in italics indicate fastest lap)

Year	Team	Class	Car	Engine	1	2	3	4	5	6	7	8	9	10	11	Rank	Points
2014	SRT Motorsports	GTLM	SRT Viper GTS-R	Dodge 8.0L V10	DAY; 6	SEB; 2	LBH	LGA	WGL	MOS	IMS	ELK	VIR	COT	PET; 6	20th	85

=== Complete Asian Le Mans Series results ===
(key) (Races in bold indicate pole position) (Races in italics indicate fastest lap)

Year	Team	Class	Car	Engine	1	2	3	4	5	Pos.	Points
2015–16	Clearwater Racing	GT	McLaren 650S GT3	McLaren M838T 3.8 L Turbo V8	**FUJ**; 1	**SEP**; 1	**BUR**; 5	SEP; 3		1st	78
2023	Garage 59	GT	McLaren 720S GT3	McLaren M840T 4.0 L Turbo V8	DUB; 1; 12	DUB; 2; 5	ABU; 1; 11	ABU; 2; 10		13th	11
2023–24	Optimum Motorsport	GT	McLaren 720S GT3 Evo	McLaren M840T 4.0 L Turbo V8	SEP; 1; 17	SEP; 2; 3	DUB; 6	ABU; 1; 3	ABU; 2; 14	6th	38

Sporting positions
Preceded by Alex Buncombe; Katsumasa Chiyo; Wolfgang Reip	Blancpain GT Series Endurance Cup; Champion; 2016; With: Côme Ledogar and Shane van Gisbergen	Succeeded by Mirko Bortolotti; Andrea Caldarelli; Christian Engelhart
