= 2011 24 Hours of Spa =

2011 Total Spa 24 Hours

Seasons
- ← 2010 2012 →

Layout of the Circuit de Spa-Francorchamps

The 2011 Total 24 Hours of Spa was the 64th running of the 24 Hours of Spa. It was also the third round of the 2011 Blancpain Endurance Series season and was held over 30 and 31 July at the Circuit de Spa-Francorchamps. The race was won by Greg Franchi, Timo Scheider, and Mattias Ekström of Audi Sport Team WRT.

Remarkably, the BMW Z4 GT3 of Need for Speed Team Schubert finished in second place, having started from 49th place on the grid.

== Qualifying ==
Most of the 62 qualifiers set their fastest times in the third qualifying session due to the fully dry track. In the previous two sessions it was a drying wet track.

=== Qualifying result ===
Class leaders are in bold, the fastest lap for each car is in gray.

Pos	No.	Team	Class	Qualifying 1	Qualifying 2	Qualifying 3	Grid
1	**40**	**Marc VDS Racing Team**	**GT3; Pro**	**2:41.502**	**2:43.374**	**2:24.488**	**1**
2	75	Prospeed Competition	GT3; Pro	2:44.664	2:46.363	2:24.735	2
3	9	AutOrlando Sport	GT3; Pro	2:46.697	2:47.025	2:26.713	3
4	**24**	**Blancpain Reiter**	**GT3; Pro-Am**	**2:41.478**	**No Time**	**2:26.807**	**4**
5	888	Haribo Team Manthey	GT3; Pro-Am	2:44.411	2:43.958	2:26.952	5
6	74	Prospeed Competition	GT3; Pro-Am	2:47.945	2:51.056	2:27.195	6
7	33	Audi Sport Team WRT	GT3; Pro	2:40.472	2:47.271	2:27.842	7
8	50	AF Corse	GT3; Pro-Am	2:46.506	2:54.592	2:28.262	8
9	55	Graff Racing	GT3; Pro-Am	2:41.536	2:41.866	2:28.355	9
10	98	Audi Sport Team Phoenix	GT3; Pro	2:41.007	2:43.150	2:28.573	10
11	4	Hexis AMR	GT3; Pro	2:42.130	2:43.079	2:28.686	11
12	15	KRK Racing Team Holland	GT3; Pro	2:43.773	2:47.330	2:29.002	12
13	99	Audi Sport Team Phoenix	GT3; Pro	2:44.191	2:42.856	2:29.250	13
14	25	Blancpain Reiter	GT3; Pro	2:43.708	No Time	2:29.484	14
15	20	SOFREV Auto Sport Promotion	GT3; Pro-Am	2:46.561	2:49.479	2:29.515	15
16	41	Marc VDS Racing Team	GT3; Pro	2:42.698	2:43.812	2:29.597	16
17	26	Delahaye Racing	GT3; Pro-Am	2:41.979	2:43.232	2:29.612	17
18	54	Graff Racing	GT3; Pro-Am	2:41.206	2:43.185	2:29.878	18
19	35	Black Falcon	GT3; Pro	2:43.335	2:47.523	2:29.970	19
20	29	Vita4One	GT3; Pro	2:48.066	2:47.280	2:30.026	20
21	1	Vita4One	GT3; Pro	2:46.149	2:46.532	2:30.082	21
22	10	SOFREV Auto Sport Promotion	GT3; Pro	2:44.225	2:47.165	2:30.730	22
23	3	Hexis AMR	GT3; Pro	2:45.366	2:47.544	2:31.170	23
24	6	Rhino's Leipert Motorsport	GT3; Pro-Am	2:48.188	2:46.370	2:31.823	24
25	90	Team Preci-Spark	GT3; Pro-Am	2:51.907	2:56.062	2:31.824	25
26	2	Vita4One	GT3; Pro-Am	2:46.535	2:49.761	2:32.243	26
27	123	Mühlner Motorsport	GT3; Pro-Am	2:49.911	No Time	2:33.552	27
28	**22**	**Sport Garage**	**GT3; Gent.**	**No Time**	**2:55.577**	**2:33.948**	**28**
29	23	United Autosports	GT3; Pro-Am	2:45.838	2:52.867	2:34.216	29
30	79	Ecurie Ecosse	GT3; Pro-Am	2:58.271	2:58.511	2:34.661	30
31	18	De Lorenzi Racing	GT3; Pro-Am	No Time	2:51.578	2:34.956	31
32	42	Sport Garage	GT3; Pro-Am	2:53.674	2:49.427	2:35.130	32
33	92	Marc VDS Racing Team	GT3; Pro-Am	2:48.917	2:48.521	2:35.295	33
34	11	United Autosports	GT3; Pro-Am	2:48.405	2:53.133	2:35.543	34
35	58	McLaren GT	GT3; Pro	3:00.008	2:57.338	2:37.061	35
36	59	McLaren GT	GT3; Pro	No Time	2:47.162	2:37.637	36
37	8	GPR AMR	GT3; Pro-Am	2:46.060	3:03.606	2:37.854	37
38	60	VonRyan Racing	GT3; Pro-Am	2:47.251	2:47.270	2:38.200	38
39	38	Black Falcon	GT3; Pro-Am	2:48.807	2:49.077	2:38.310	39
40	124	Mühlner Motorsport	GT3; Gent.	2:47.476	No Time	2:38.896	40
41	32	Audi Sport Team WRT	GT3; Pro	2:42.443	2:47.523	2:38.997	41
42	78	AMR / Grivegnée	GT3; Gent.	2:53.470	2:55.748	2:39.691	42
43	116	Signa Motorsport	GT3; Gent.	2:57.246	2:57.243	2:39.858	43
44	**63**	**RJN Motorsport**	**GT4**	**3:00.595**	**3:02.359**	**2:41.276**	**44**
45	85	VDS Racing Adventures	GT3; Gent.	2:59.338	2:57.107	2:41.911	45
46	**56**	**RMS**	**Cup**	**3:03.411**	**3:02.488**	**2:42.528**	**46**
47	44	Faster Racing by DB Motorsport	GT3; Pro-Am	2:43.847	2:45.927	2:42.543	47
48	43	Faster Racing by DB Motorsport	GT3; Pro-Am	2:42.909	2:43.238	No Time	48
49	76	Need for Speed Team Schubert	GT3; Pro	2:43.157	2:50.080	No Time	49
50	70	Lotus Sport Italia	GT4	3:00.807	3:11.754	2:43.271	50
51	16	KRK Racing Team Holland	GT3; Pro-Am	2:43.288	2:50.883	No Time	51
52	100	DVB Racing	GT4	3:04.117	3:07.801	2:43.913	52
53	12	United Autosports	GT3; Pro-Am	2:50.119	2:51.419	2:44.720	53
54	19	Level Racing	GT3; Gent.	3:02.619	2:59.601	2:45.586	54
55	45	Gulf Team First	GT3; Pro-Am	2:48.365	3:07.752	2:49.910	55
56	51	AF Corse	GT3; Pro-Am	2:53.825	2:51.233	2:48.517	56
57	161	Freeman Gepa 161	Cup	2:56.793	3:05.418	2:53.432	57
58	82	GCR	GT3; Gent.	2:54.820	3:06.217	3:02.405	58
59	36	De Lorenzi Racing	Cup	3:03.413	3:00.015	2:56.484	59
60	104	Speed Lover	Cup	3:02.556	2:58.315	No Time	60
61	57	RMS	Cup	3:00.778	3:07.053	3:08.897	61
62	103	Speed Lover	GT4	3:12.084	3:25.466	3:16.745	62

== Race ==
=== Race result ===
Class winners in bold. Cars failing to complete 70% of winner's distance marked as Not Classified (NC).

Pos	Class	No	Team	Drivers	Chassis	Tyre	Laps
Pos	Class	No	Team	Drivers	Engine	Tyre	Laps
1	**GT3; Pro**	**33**	**(Belgium) Audi Sport Team WRT**	**(Belgium) Greg Franchi (Germany) Timo Scheider (Sweden) Mattias Ekström**	**Audi R8 LMS**	M	**545**
1	**GT3; Pro**	**33**	**(Belgium) Audi Sport Team WRT**	**(Belgium) Greg Franchi (Germany) Timo Scheider (Sweden) Mattias Ekström**	**Audi CJJ 5.2 L V10**	M	**545**
2	GT3; Pro	76	(Germany) Need for Speed Team Schubert	(Sweden) Edward Sandström (Germany) Dirk Werner (Germany) Claudia Hürtgen	BMW Z4 GT3	D	543
2	GT3; Pro	76	(Germany) Need for Speed Team Schubert	(Sweden) Edward Sandström (Germany) Dirk Werner (Germany) Claudia Hürtgen	BMW P65B44 4.4 L V8	D	543
3	GT3; Pro	35	(Germany) Black Falcon	(Germany) Kenneth Heyer (Germany) Thomas Jäger (Belgium) Stéphane Lémeret	Mercedes-Benz SLS AMG GT3	D	535
3	GT3; Pro	35	(Germany) Black Falcon	(Germany) Kenneth Heyer (Germany) Thomas Jäger (Belgium) Stéphane Lémeret	Mercedes-Benz M159 6.2 L V8	D	535
4	GT3; Pro	32	(Belgium) Audi Sport Team WRT	(Belgium) Bert Longin (Portugal) Filipe Albuquerque (Monaco) Stéphane Ortelli	Audi R8 LMS	M	534
4	GT3; Pro	32	(Belgium) Audi Sport Team WRT	(Belgium) Bert Longin (Portugal) Filipe Albuquerque (Monaco) Stéphane Ortelli	Audi CJJ 5.2 L V10	M	534
5	GT3; Pro	29	(Germany) Vita4One	(Italy) Matteo Bobbi (Italy) Giacomo Petrobelli (Germany) Frank Kechele	Ferrari 458 Italia GT3	M	531
5	GT3; Pro	29	(Germany) Vita4One	(Italy) Matteo Bobbi (Italy) Giacomo Petrobelli (Germany) Frank Kechele	Ferrari F136 4.5 L V8	M	531
6	**GT3; Pro-Am**	**20**	**(France) SOFREV Auto Sport Promotion**	**(France) Franck Morel (France) Jean-Luc Beaubélique (France) Ludovic Badey (France) Guillaume Moreau**	**Ferrari 458 Italia GT3**	M	**530**
6	**GT3; Pro-Am**	**20**	**(France) SOFREV Auto Sport Promotion**	**(France) Franck Morel (France) Jean-Luc Beaubélique (France) Ludovic Badey (France) Guillaume Moreau**	**Ferrari F136 4.5 L V8**	M	**530**
7	GT3; Pro-Am	90	(United Kingdom) Team Preci-Spark	(United Kingdom) David Jones (United Kingdom) Godfrey Jones (United Kingdom) Mike Jordan	Mercedes-Benz SLS AMG GT3	A	529
7	GT3; Pro-Am	90	(United Kingdom) Team Preci-Spark	(United Kingdom) David Jones (United Kingdom) Godfrey Jones (United Kingdom) Mike Jordan	Mercedes-Benz M159 6.2 L V8	A	529
8	GT3; Pro	3	(France) Hexis AMR	(France) Pierre-Brice Mena (France) Julien Rodrigues (France) Yann Clairay	Aston Martin DBRS9	M	527
8	GT3; Pro	3	(France) Hexis AMR	(France) Pierre-Brice Mena (France) Julien Rodrigues (France) Yann Clairay	Aston Martin AM04 6.0 L V12	M	527
9	GT3; Pro-Am	50	(Italy) AF Corse	(South Africa) Jack Gerber (Republic of Ireland) Matt Griffin (Italy) Niki Cadei (Italy) Marco Cioci	Ferrari 458 Italia GT3	M	526
9	GT3; Pro-Am	50	(Italy) AF Corse	(South Africa) Jack Gerber (Republic of Ireland) Matt Griffin (Italy) Niki Cadei (Italy) Marco Cioci	Ferrari F136 4.5 L V8	M	526
10	GT3; Pro-Am	43	(Netherlands) Faster Racing by DB Motorsport	(Netherlands) Jeroen de Boer (Netherlands) Simon Knap (Netherlands) David Hart	BMW Z4 GT3	M	521
10	GT3; Pro-Am	43	(Netherlands) Faster Racing by DB Motorsport	(Netherlands) Jeroen de Boer (Netherlands) Simon Knap (Netherlands) David Hart	BMW P65B44 4.4 L V8	M	521
11	GT3; Pro	41	(Belgium) Marc VDS Racing Team	(Finland) Markus Palttala (France) Antoine Leclerc (Switzerland) Jonathan Hirschi	Ford GT GT3	M	521
11	GT3; Pro	41	(Belgium) Marc VDS Racing Team	(Finland) Markus Palttala (France) Antoine Leclerc (Switzerland) Jonathan Hirschi	Ford Cammer 5.0 L V8	M	521
12	GT3; Pro-Am	38	(Germany) Black Falcon	(Ukraine) Andrii Lebed (United States) Bret Curtis (Netherlands) Peter van der Kolk (Netherlands) Jeroen van der Heuvel	Mercedes-Benz SLS AMG GT3	Y	518
12	GT3; Pro-Am	38	(Germany) Black Falcon	(Ukraine) Andrii Lebed (United States) Bret Curtis (Netherlands) Peter van der Kolk (Netherlands) Jeroen van der Heuvel	Mercedes-Benz M159 6.2 L V8	Y	518
13	GT3; Pro-Am	23	(United States) United Autosports	(United States) Zak Brown (United Kingdom) Richard Dean (United Kingdom) Johnny Herbert (Sweden) Stefan Johansson	Audi R8 LMS	D	512
13	GT3; Pro-Am	23	(United States) United Autosports	(United States) Zak Brown (United Kingdom) Richard Dean (United Kingdom) Johnny Herbert (Sweden) Stefan Johansson	Audi CJJ 5.2 L V10	D	512
14	GT3; Pro	98	(Germany) Audi Sport Team Phoenix	(Switzerland) Marcel Fässler (Italy) Andrea Piccini (Germany) Mike Rockenfeller	Audi R8 LMS	M	510
14	GT3; Pro	98	(Germany) Audi Sport Team Phoenix	(Switzerland) Marcel Fässler (Italy) Andrea Piccini (Germany) Mike Rockenfeller	Audi CJJ 5.2 L V10	M	510
15	GT3; Pro	4	(France) Hexis AMR	(Switzerland) Henri Moser (Netherlands) Stef Dusseldorp (France) Frédéric Makowiecki	Aston Martin DBRS9	M	510
15	GT3; Pro	4	(France) Hexis AMR	(Switzerland) Henri Moser (Netherlands) Stef Dusseldorp (France) Frédéric Makowiecki	Aston Martin AM04 6.0 L V12	M	510
16	GT3; Pro-Am	16	(Netherlands) KRK Racing Team Holland	(Belgium) Raf Vanthoor (Netherlands) Marius Ritskes (Netherlands) Bernhard van Oranje (Netherlands) Dennis Retera	Mercedes-Benz SLS AMG GT3	M	504
16	GT3; Pro-Am	16	(Netherlands) KRK Racing Team Holland	(Belgium) Raf Vanthoor (Netherlands) Marius Ritskes (Netherlands) Bernhard van Oranje (Netherlands) Dennis Retera	Mercedes-Benz M159 6.2 L V8	M	504
17	**GT3; Gent**	**19**	**(Belgium) Level Racing**	**(Belgium) Philippe Broodcoren (Belgium) Christoff Corten (Belgium) Kurt Dujardin (Netherlands) Mathijs Herkema**	**Porsche 997 GT3 Cup**	M	**493**
17	**GT3; Gent**	**19**	**(Belgium) Level Racing**	**(Belgium) Philippe Broodcoren (Belgium) Christoff Corten (Belgium) Kurt Dujardin (Netherlands) Mathijs Herkema**	**Porsche M96/75 3.6 L Flat-6**	M	**493**
18	GT3; Gent	124	(Belgium) Mühlner Motorsport	(Germany) Sebastian Asch (Germany) Tim Bergmeister (Germany) Jochen Krumbach (United Kingdom) Martin Rich	Porsche 997 GT3 Cup	M	493
18	GT3; Gent	124	(Belgium) Mühlner Motorsport	(Germany) Sebastian Asch (Germany) Tim Bergmeister (Germany) Jochen Krumbach (United Kingdom) Martin Rich	Porsche M96/75 3.6 L Flat-6	M	493
19	GT3; Pro-Am	12	(United States) United Autosports	(Netherlands) Arie Luyendyk (Hong Kong) Alain Li (United Kingdom) Richard Meins (France) Henri Richard	Audi R8 LMS	D	490
19	GT3; Pro-Am	12	(United States) United Autosports	(Netherlands) Arie Luyendyk (Hong Kong) Alain Li (United Kingdom) Richard Meins (France) Henri Richard	Audi CJJ 5.2 L V10	D	490
20	GT3; Pro-Am	79	(United Kingdom) Ecurie Ecosse (United Kingdom) Barwell Motorsport	(United Kingdom) Oliver Bryant (United Kingdom) Andrew Smith (United Kingdom) Alasdair McCaig (United Kingdom) Joe Twyman	Aston Martin DBRS9	A	489
20	GT3; Pro-Am	79	(United Kingdom) Ecurie Ecosse (United Kingdom) Barwell Motorsport	(United Kingdom) Oliver Bryant (United Kingdom) Andrew Smith (United Kingdom) Alasdair McCaig (United Kingdom) Joe Twyman	Aston Martin AM04 6.0 L V12	A	489
21	**GT4**	**63**	**(United Kingdom) RJN Motorsport**	**(France) Jordan Tresson (United Kingdom) Christopher Ward (United Kingdom) Alex Buncombe**	**Nissan 370Z GT4**	M	**476**
21	**GT4**	**63**	**(United Kingdom) RJN Motorsport**	**(France) Jordan Tresson (United Kingdom) Christopher Ward (United Kingdom) Alex Buncombe**	**Nissan VQ37VHR 3.7 V6**	M	**476**
22	GT3; Gent	116	(Belgium) Signa Motorsport	(Belgium) Patrick Chaillet (Belgium) Thierry de Latre du Bosqueau (Belgium) Benoit Galand (Belgium) Christophe Geoffroy	Dodge Viper Competition Coupe	M	473
22	GT3; Gent	116	(Belgium) Signa Motorsport	(Belgium) Patrick Chaillet (Belgium) Thierry de Latre du Bosqueau (Belgium) Benoit Galand (Belgium) Christophe Geoffroy	Dodge EWC 8.3 L V10	M	473
23	GT3; Pro-Am	60	(United Kingdom) McLaren GT (United Kingdom) VonRyan Racing	(United Kingdom) Adam Christodoulou (United Kingdom) Glynn Geddie (United Kingdom) Phil Quaife (New Zealand) Roger Wills	McLaren MP4-12C GT3	M	469
23	GT3; Pro-Am	60	(United Kingdom) McLaren GT (United Kingdom) VonRyan Racing	(United Kingdom) Adam Christodoulou (United Kingdom) Glynn Geddie (United Kingdom) Phil Quaife (New Zealand) Roger Wills	McLaren M838T 3.8 L Turbo V8	M	469
24	GT3; Gent	82	(France) GCR	(France) Dominique Nury (France) Bernard Salam (France) Jean-Marc Merlin (France) Guy Clairay	Dodge Viper Competition Coupe	P	467
24	GT3; Gent	82	(France) GCR	(France) Dominique Nury (France) Bernard Salam (France) Jean-Marc Merlin (France) Guy Clairay	Dodge EWC 8.3 L V10	P	467
25	GT4	100	(Belgium) DVB Racing	(Belgium) Christophe Legrand (Italy) Raffaele Sangiuolo (Italy) Giuseppe de Pasquale (Germany) Wolfgang Haugg	BMW M3 GT4	D	465
25	GT4	100	(Belgium) DVB Racing	(Belgium) Christophe Legrand (Italy) Raffaele Sangiuolo (Italy) Giuseppe de Pasquale (Germany) Wolfgang Haugg	BMW S65B40 4.0 L V8	D	465
26	GT3; Pro-Am	92	(Belgium) Marc VDS Racing Team	(Belgium) Marc Duez (Belgium) Jean-Michel Martin (Belgium) Éric Bachelart	Ford Mustang Marc VDS GT3	M	444
26	GT3; Pro-Am	92	(Belgium) Marc VDS Racing Team	(Belgium) Marc Duez (Belgium) Jean-Michel Martin (Belgium) Éric Bachelart	Ford Cammer 5.3 L V8	M	444
27	**Cup**	**57**	**(France) RMS**	**(Switzerland) Manuel Nicolaïdis (Switzerland) Fabio Spirgi (Switzerland) Richard Feller (France) Olivier Baron**	**Porsche 997 GT3 Cup**	M	**442**
27	**Cup**	**57**	**(France) RMS**	**(Switzerland) Manuel Nicolaïdis (Switzerland) Fabio Spirgi (Switzerland) Richard Feller (France) Olivier Baron**	**Porsche M97/75 3.6 L Flat-6**	M	**442**
28	GT3; Gent	85	(Belgium) VDS Racing Aventures	(Belgium) Raphaël Van Der Straten (Belgium) José Close (Belgium) Julien Schroyen (Belgium) Benjamin Bailly	Ford Mustang FR500 GT3	D	437
28	GT3; Gent	85	(Belgium) VDS Racing Aventures	(Belgium) Raphaël Van Der Straten (Belgium) José Close (Belgium) Julien Schroyen (Belgium) Benjamin Bailly	Ford Cammer 5.0 L V8	D	437
29	Cup	161	(Belgium) Freeman Gepa 161	(France) Pascal Muller (Belgium) Patrick Geladé (Belgium) Didier Grandjean (Belgium) Dominique Sandona	Porsche 997 GT3 Cup	M	405
29	Cup	161	(Belgium) Freeman Gepa 161	(France) Pascal Muller (Belgium) Patrick Geladé (Belgium) Didier Grandjean (Belgium) Dominique Sandona	Porsche M97/75 3.6 L Flat-6	M	405
30 DNF	GT3; Pro-Am	888	(Germany) Haribo Team Manthey	(United Kingdom) Richard Westbrook (Germany) Christian Menzel (Germany) Mike Stursberg (Germany) Hans Guido Riegel	Porsche 997 GT3-R	M	485
30 DNF	GT3; Pro-Am	888	(Germany) Haribo Team Manthey	(United Kingdom) Richard Westbrook (Germany) Christian Menzel (Germany) Mike Stursberg (Germany) Hans Guido Riegel	Porsche M97/79 4.0 L Flat-6	M	485
31 DNF	Cup	56	(France) RMS	(Monaco) Marc Faggionato (France) Thierry Prignaud (France) Thierry Stépec (France) Franck Racinet	Porsche 997 GT3 Cup	M	470
31 DNF	Cup	56	(France) RMS	(Monaco) Marc Faggionato (France) Thierry Prignaud (France) Thierry Stépec (France) Franck Racinet	Porsche M97/75 3.6 L Flat-6	M	470
32 DNF	GT3; Pro-Am	44	(Netherlands) Faster Racing by DB Motorsport	(Netherlands) Hoevert Vos (Netherlands) Harrie Kolen (Netherlands) Xavier Maassen (United Kingdom) Archie Hamilton	BMW Z4 GT3	M	432
32 DNF	GT3; Pro-Am	44	(Netherlands) Faster Racing by DB Motorsport	(Netherlands) Hoevert Vos (Netherlands) Harrie Kolen (Netherlands) Xavier Maassen (United Kingdom) Archie Hamilton	BMW P65B44 4.4 L V8	M	432
33 DNF	GT3; Pro	10	(France) SOFREV Auto Sport Promotion	(France) Patrice Goueslard (France) Olivier Pla (France) Julien Jousse	Ferrari 458 Italia GT3	M	374
33 DNF	GT3; Pro	10	(France) SOFREV Auto Sport Promotion	(France) Patrice Goueslard (France) Olivier Pla (France) Julien Jousse	Ferrari F136 4.5 L V8	M	374
34 DNF	GT3; Pro-Am	55	(France) Graff Racing	(France) Philippe Haezebrouck (France) Mike Parisy (France) Gilles Vannelet (Italy) Massimo Vignali	Mercedes-Benz SLS AMG GT3	M	367
34 DNF	GT3; Pro-Am	55	(France) Graff Racing	(France) Philippe Haezebrouck (France) Mike Parisy (France) Gilles Vannelet (Italy) Massimo Vignali	Mercedes-Benz M159 6.2 L V8	M	367
35 DNF	GT3; Pro-Am	54	(France) Graff Racing	(France) Olivier Panis (France) Eric Debard (France) Grégoire Demoustier (France) Nicolas Lapierre	Mercedes-Benz SLS AMG GT3	M	364
35 DNF	GT3; Pro-Am	54	(France) Graff Racing	(France) Olivier Panis (France) Eric Debard (France) Grégoire Demoustier (France) Nicolas Lapierre	Mercedes-Benz M159 6.2 L V8	M	364
36 DNF	GT3; Pro	75	(Belgium) Prospeed Competition	(Belgium) Jan Heylen (Belgium) Marc Goossens (Belgium) Maxime Soulet	Porsche 997 GT3-R	M	331
36 DNF	GT3; Pro	75	(Belgium) Prospeed Competition	(Belgium) Jan Heylen (Belgium) Marc Goossens (Belgium) Maxime Soulet	Porsche M97/79 4.0 L Flat-6	M	331
37 DNF	GT3; Pro-Am	6	(Germany) Rhino's Leipert Motorsport	(Portugal) Ricardo Bravo (Portugal) Lourenço Beirão da Veiga (Portugal) Duarte Félix da Costa (Finland) Mika Vähämaki	Lamborghini Gallardo LP600+ GT3	M	329
37 DNF	GT3; Pro-Am	6	(Germany) Rhino's Leipert Motorsport	(Portugal) Ricardo Bravo (Portugal) Lourenço Beirão da Veiga (Portugal) Duarte Félix da Costa (Finland) Mika Vähämaki	Lamborghini CEH 5.2 L V10	M	329
38 DNF	GT3; Gent	22	(France) Sport Garage	(France) Lionel Comole (France) André Alain Corbel (France) Thomas Duchêne (France) Eric Vaissière	Ferrari 430 Scuderia GT3	M	319
38 DNF	GT3; Gent	22	(France) Sport Garage	(France) Lionel Comole (France) André Alain Corbel (France) Thomas Duchêne (France) Eric Vaissière	Ferrari F136 4.5 L V8	M	319
39 DNF	GT4	70	(Italy) Lotus Sport Italia	(Italy) Gianni Giudici (Italy) Edoardo Piscopo (United Kingdom) Greg Mansell (United Kingdom) Leo Mansell	Lotus Evora GT4	M	315
39 DNF	GT4	70	(Italy) Lotus Sport Italia	(Italy) Gianni Giudici (Italy) Edoardo Piscopo (United Kingdom) Greg Mansell (United Kingdom) Leo Mansell	Toyota 2GR-FE 4.0 L V6	M	315
40 DNF	GT3; Pro	1	(Germany) Vita4One	(France) Jean-Karl Vernay (Belgium) Eric van de Poele (Belgium) Nico Verdonck	Ferrari 458 Italia GT3	M	251
40 DNF	GT3; Pro	1	(Germany) Vita4One	(France) Jean-Karl Vernay (Belgium) Eric van de Poele (Belgium) Nico Verdonck	Ferrari F136 4.5 L V8	M	251
41 DNF	Cup	36	(Italy) De Lorenzi Racing	(Italy) Sergio Negroni (Italy) Stefano Crotti (Italy) Roberto Fecchio (Italy) Giorgio Piodi	Porsche 997 GT3 Cup	M	239
41 DNF	Cup	36	(Italy) De Lorenzi Racing	(Italy) Sergio Negroni (Italy) Stefano Crotti (Italy) Roberto Fecchio (Italy) Giorgio Piodi	Porsche M97/75 3.6 L Flat-6	M	239
42 DNF	GT4	103	(Belgium) Speed Lover	(France) Christophe Bigourie (Belgium) Sven van Laere (Belgium) Peter van Audenhove (Belgium) René Marin	Aston Martin V8 Vantage GT4	M	235
42 DNF	GT4	103	(Belgium) Speed Lover	(France) Christophe Bigourie (Belgium) Sven van Laere (Belgium) Peter van Audenhove (Belgium) René Marin	Aston Martin AM14 4.7 L V8	M	235
43 DNF	GT3; Pro	9	(Italy) AutOrlando Sport	(Italy) Paolo Ruberti (Italy) Gianluca Roda (Italy) Raffaele Gianmaria	Porsche 997 GT3-R	M	233
43 DNF	GT3; Pro	9	(Italy) AutOrlando Sport	(Italy) Paolo Ruberti (Italy) Gianluca Roda (Italy) Raffaele Gianmaria	Porsche M97/79 4.0 L Flat-6	M	233
44 DNF	GT3; Pro	99	(Germany) Audi Sport Team Phoenix	(Germany) Marc Basseng (Germany) Christopher Haase (Germany) Frank Stippler	Audi R8 LMS	M	224
44 DNF	GT3; Pro	99	(Germany) Audi Sport Team Phoenix	(Germany) Marc Basseng (Germany) Christopher Haase (Germany) Frank Stippler	Audi CJJ 5.2 L V10	M	224
45 DNF	GT3; Pro-Am	26	(Belgium) Delahaye Racing	(Belgium) Frédéric Bouvy (Belgium) Damien Coens (Belgium) Christian Kelders (Belgium) Jean-Luc Blanchemain	Chevrolet Corvette Z06.R	M	215
45 DNF	GT3; Pro-Am	26	(Belgium) Delahaye Racing	(Belgium) Frédéric Bouvy (Belgium) Damien Coens (Belgium) Christian Kelders (Belgium) Jean-Luc Blanchemain	Chevrolet LS7 7.0 L V8	M	215
46 DNF	Cup	104	(Belgium) Speed Lover	(Belgium) Michel De Coster (Belgium) Rik Renmans (Netherlands) Oskar Slingerland (Netherlands) Tom Langeberg	Porsche 997 GT3 Cup	M	200
46 DNF	Cup	104	(Belgium) Speed Lover	(Belgium) Michel De Coster (Belgium) Rik Renmans (Netherlands) Oskar Slingerland (Netherlands) Tom Langeberg	Porsche M97/75 3.6 L Flat-6	M	200
47 DNF	GT3; Pro-Am	42	(France) Sport Garage	(France) Éric Cayrolle (France) Christophe Jouet (France) Michaël Petit (France) Romain Brandela	Ferrari 430 Scuderia GT3	M	160
47 DNF	GT3; Pro-Am	42	(France) Sport Garage	(France) Éric Cayrolle (France) Christophe Jouet (France) Michaël Petit (France) Romain Brandela	Ferrari F136 4.5 L V8	M	160
48 DNF	GT3; Pro-Am	008	(Belgium) GPR AMR	(Belgium) Eddy Renard (United Kingdom) Gavin Pickering (Czech Republic) Tomáš Enge (Czech Republic) Jan Stoviček	Aston Martin DBRS9	M	154
48 DNF	GT3; Pro-Am	008	(Belgium) GPR AMR	(Belgium) Eddy Renard (United Kingdom) Gavin Pickering (Czech Republic) Tomáš Enge (Czech Republic) Jan Stoviček	Aston Martin AM04 6.0 L V12	M	154
49 DNF	GT3; Pro	15	(Netherlands) KRK Racing Team Holland	(Netherlands) Mike Hezemans (Belgium) Koen Wauters (Belgium) Anthony Kumpen	Mercedes-Benz SLS AMG GT3	M	151
49 DNF	GT3; Pro	15	(Netherlands) KRK Racing Team Holland	(Netherlands) Mike Hezemans (Belgium) Koen Wauters (Belgium) Anthony Kumpen	Mercedes-Benz M159 6.2 L V8	M	151
50 DNF	GT3; Pro-Am	45	(United Arab Emirates) Gulf Team First	(Belgium) Andrea Barlesi (France) Frédéric Fatien (France) Fabien Giroix (Saudi Arabia) Karim Al-Azhari	Lamborghini Gallardo LP600+ GT3	M	136
50 DNF	GT3; Pro-Am	45	(United Arab Emirates) Gulf Team First	(Belgium) Andrea Barlesi (France) Frédéric Fatien (France) Fabien Giroix (Saudi Arabia) Karim Al-Azhari	Lamborghini CEH 5.2 L V10	M	136
51 DNF	GT3; Pro-Am	123	(Belgium) Mühlner Motorsport	(Belgium) Armand Fumal (Belgium) Jérôme Thiry (Belgium) Christian Lefort (Sweden) Carl Rosenblad	Porsche 997 GT3-R	M	131
51 DNF	GT3; Pro-Am	123	(Belgium) Mühlner Motorsport	(Belgium) Armand Fumal (Belgium) Jérôme Thiry (Belgium) Christian Lefort (Sweden) Carl Rosenblad	Porsche M97/79 4.0 L Flat-6	M	131
52 DNF	GT3; Pro-Am	18	(Italy) De Lorenzi Racing	(Italy) Gianluca de Lorenzi (Italy) Alessandro Bonetti (Italy) Beniamino Caccia (Italy) Lorenzo Bontempelli	Porsche 997 GT3-R	M	128
52 DNF	GT3; Pro-Am	18	(Italy) De Lorenzi Racing	(Italy) Gianluca de Lorenzi (Italy) Alessandro Bonetti (Italy) Beniamino Caccia (Italy) Lorenzo Bontempelli	Porsche M97/79 4.0 L Flat-6	M	128
53 DNF	GT3; Pro-Am	11	(United States) United Autosports	(United Kingdom) Mark Blundell (South Africa) Mark Patterson (United States) Eddie Cheever (United Kingdom) Matt Bell	Audi R8 LMS	D	112
53 DNF	GT3; Pro-Am	11	(United States) United Autosports	(United Kingdom) Mark Blundell (South Africa) Mark Patterson (United States) Eddie Cheever (United Kingdom) Matt Bell	Audi CJJ 5.2 L V10	D	112
54 DNF	GT3; Pro	40	(Belgium) Marc VDS Racing Team	(Germany) Marc Hennerici (Belgium) Maxime Martin (Belgium) Bas Leinders	BMW Z4 GT3	M	102
54 DNF	GT3; Pro	40	(Belgium) Marc VDS Racing Team	(Germany) Marc Hennerici (Belgium) Maxime Martin (Belgium) Bas Leinders	BMW P65B44 4.4 L V8	M	102
55 DNF	GT3; Pro	58	(United Kingdom) McLaren GT	(United Kingdom) Rob Bell (United Kingdom) Chris Goodwin (United Kingdom) Tim Mullen	McLaren MP4-12C GT3	A	88
55 DNF	GT3; Pro	58	(United Kingdom) McLaren GT	(United Kingdom) Rob Bell (United Kingdom) Chris Goodwin (United Kingdom) Tim Mullen	McLaren M838T 3.8 L Turbo V8	A	88
56 DNF	GT3; Pro-Am	51	(Italy) AF Corse	(France) Yannick Mallégol (France) Jean-Marc Bachelier (United States) Howard Blank	Ferrari 458 Italia GT3	M	69
56 DNF	GT3; Pro-Am	51	(Italy) AF Corse	(France) Yannick Mallégol (France) Jean-Marc Bachelier (United States) Howard Blank	Ferrari F136 4.5 L V8	M	69
57 DNF	GT3; Pro-Am	24	(Germany) Blancpain-Reiter	(Switzerland) Marc Hayek (Netherlands) Peter Kox (Netherlands) Jos Menten	Lamborghini Gallardo LP600+ GT3	M	65
57 DNF	GT3; Pro-Am	24	(Germany) Blancpain-Reiter	(Switzerland) Marc Hayek (Netherlands) Peter Kox (Netherlands) Jos Menten	Lamborghini CEH 5.2 L V10	M	65
58 DNF	GT3; Pro-Am	74	(Belgium) Prospeed Competition	(Netherlands) Paul van Splunteren (United States) Bryce Miller (Belgium) Nicolas de Crem (Belgium) Ludovic Sougnez	Porsche 997 GT3-R	M	43
58 DNF	GT3; Pro-Am	74	(Belgium) Prospeed Competition	(Netherlands) Paul van Splunteren (United States) Bryce Miller (Belgium) Nicolas de Crem (Belgium) Ludovic Sougnez	Porsche M97/79 4.0 L Flat-6	M	43
59 DNF	GT3; Pro	25	(Germany) Blancpain-Reiter	(Italy) Eugenio Amos (Austria) Nikolaus Mayr-Melnhof (Germany) Albert von Thurn und Taxis	Lamborghini Gallardo LP600+ GT3	M	36
59 DNF	GT3; Pro	25	(Germany) Blancpain-Reiter	(Italy) Eugenio Amos (Austria) Nikolaus Mayr-Melnhof (Germany) Albert von Thurn und Taxis	Lamborghini CEH 5.2 L V10	M	36
60 DNF	GT3; Gent	78	(Belgium) GPR AMR / Grivegnée	(Belgium) Pierre Grivegnée (Belgium) Jean-Pierre Vandewauwer (Belgium) Alex van de Poele	Aston Martin DBRS9	M	19
60 DNF	GT3; Gent	78	(Belgium) GPR AMR / Grivegnée	(Belgium) Pierre Grivegnée (Belgium) Jean-Pierre Vandewauwer (Belgium) Alex van de Poele	Aston Martin AM04 6.0 L V12	M	19
61 DNF	GT3; Pro	59	(United Kingdom) McLaren GT	(United Kingdom) Andrew Kirkaldy (United Kingdom) Oliver Turvey (Portugal) Álvaro Parente	McLaren MP4-12C GT3	M	2
61 DNF	GT3; Pro	59	(United Kingdom) McLaren GT	(United Kingdom) Andrew Kirkaldy (United Kingdom) Oliver Turvey (Portugal) Álvaro Parente	McLaren M838T 3.8 L Turbo V8	M	2
DSQ	GT3; Pro-Am	2	(Germany) Vita4One	(Netherlands) Niek Hommerson (Belgium) Louis Machiels (Germany) Michael Bartels (Italy) Andrea Bertolini	Ferrari 458 Italia GT3	M	401
DSQ	GT3; Pro-Am	2	(Germany) Vita4One	(Netherlands) Niek Hommerson (Belgium) Louis Machiels (Germany) Michael Bartels (Italy) Andrea Bertolini	Ferrari F136 4.5 L V8	M	401
