= BMW Z4 (E89) =

Second generation of BMW Z4 roadsters

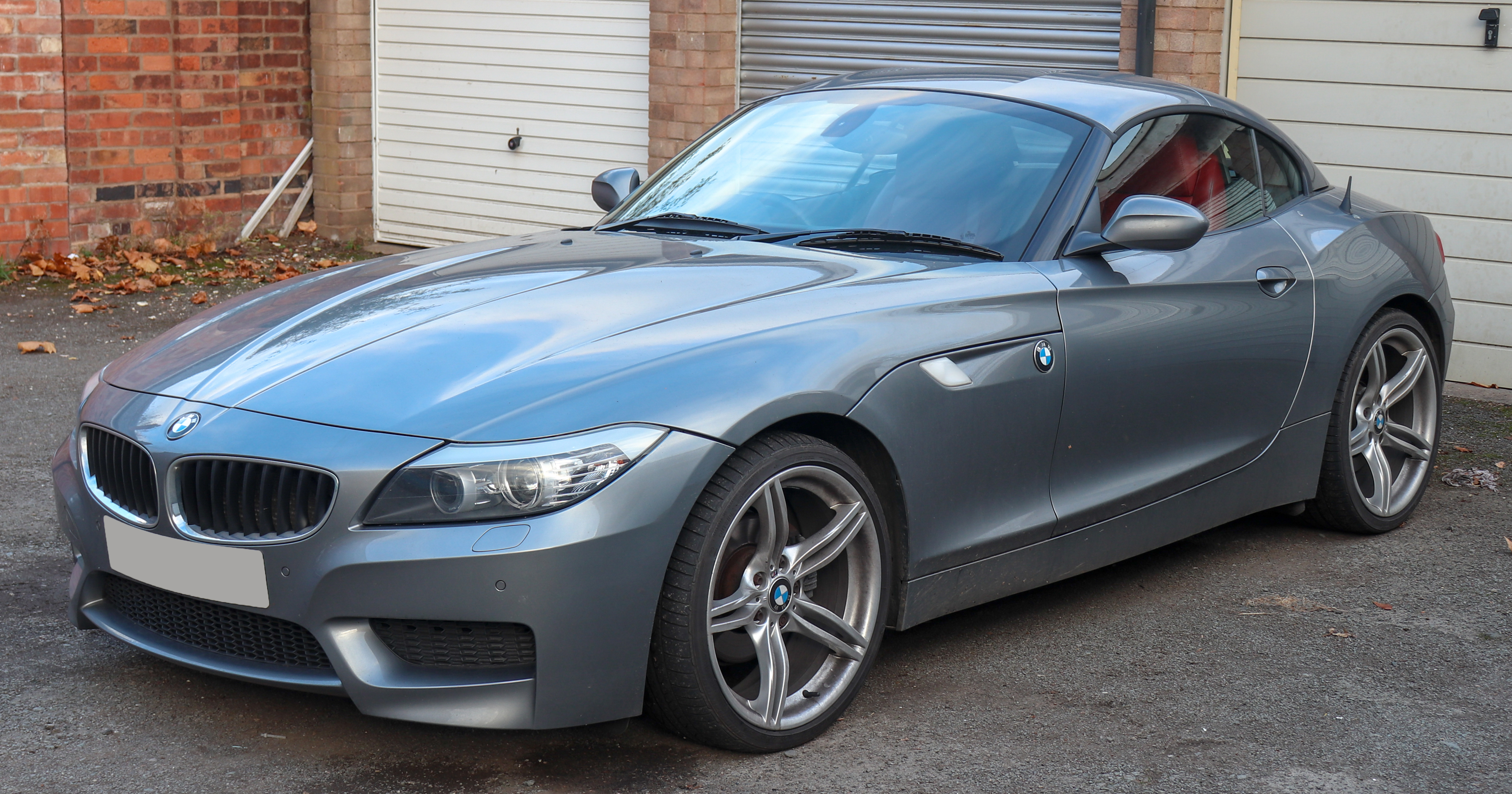

Overview
- Manufacturer: BMW
- Model code: E89
- Production: February 2009 – August 2016
- Model years: 2009–2016
- Assembly: Germany: Regensburg
- Designer: Juliane Blasi (exterior); Nadya Arnaout (interior)

Body and chassis
- Class: Sports car (S)
- Body style: 2-door coupé convertible
- Layout: Front-engine, rear-wheel-drive
- Platform: BMW L2
- Related: BMW 1 Series (E82); BMW 3 Series (E93)

Powertrain
- Engine: 2.0 L N20 turbo I4; 2.5 L N52 I6; 3.0 L N52 I6; 3.0 L N54 twin-turbo I6
- Transmission: 6-speed manual; 6-speed ZF 6HP automatic; 8-speed ZF 8HP automatic; 7-speed Getrag dual-clutch

Dimensions
- Wheelbase: 2,495 mm (98.2 in)
- Length: 4,239 mm (166.9 in)
- Width: 1,790 mm (70.5 in)
- Height: 1,291 mm (50.8 in)
- Kerb weight: 1,420–1,525 kg (3,131–3,362 lb)

Chronology
- Predecessor: BMW Z4 (E85)
- Successor: BMW Z4 (G29)

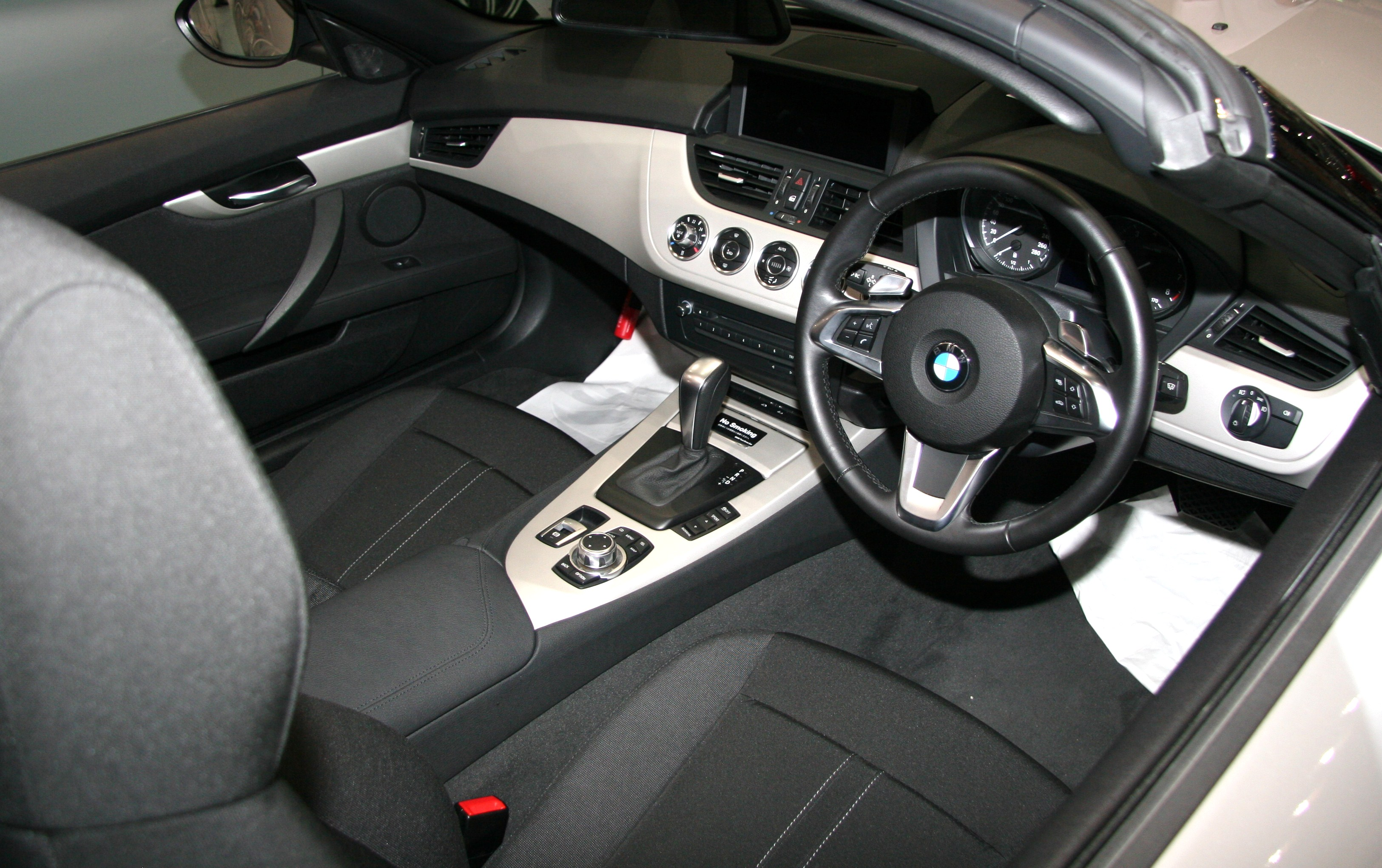
Interior

The BMW Z4 (E89) is the second generation of the BMW Z4 range of two-door roadsters, and was produced from 2009 to 2016. The E89 replaced the E85/E86 Z4 and is the fourth model in the BMW Z Series.

The E89 Z4 was the first Z Series model to use a retractable hardtop roof, which meant that there were no longer separate roadster and coupé versions of the car. There was no Z4 M model for the E89 generation.

The Z4 (E89) was succeeded by the Z4 (G29) in 2018.

== Development and launch ==
The E89 was the first BMW automobile to be completely designed by two female designers — Juliane Blasi (exterior) and Nadya Arnaout (interior) — in 2006.

The Z4 (E89) was officially announced on 13 December 2008 and was unveiled at the 2009 North American International Auto Show in Detroit, alongside the MINI Convertible. The Z4 (E89) was then launched in markets in May 2009.

A total of €130 million was spent from 2007 to 2009 in expansion of the Regensburg plant for production of the Z4 (E89). Although its predecessor was produced in the Spartanburg plant in the United States, the E89 was produced in the BMW's Regensburg plant alongside the E93 3 Series convertible making it the third Z series car to be manufactured in Germany since the Z1 and Z8.

== Design ==
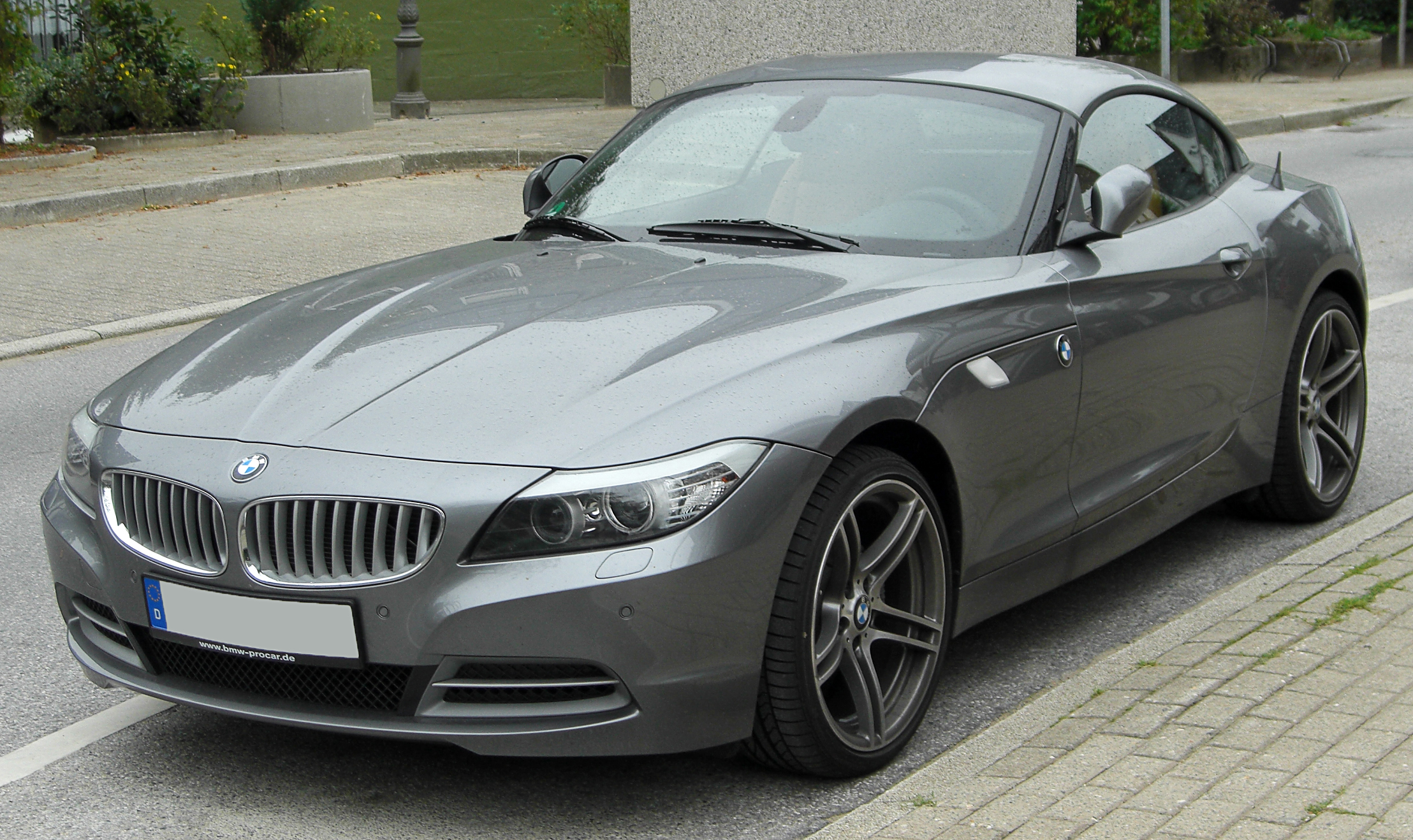
Front view

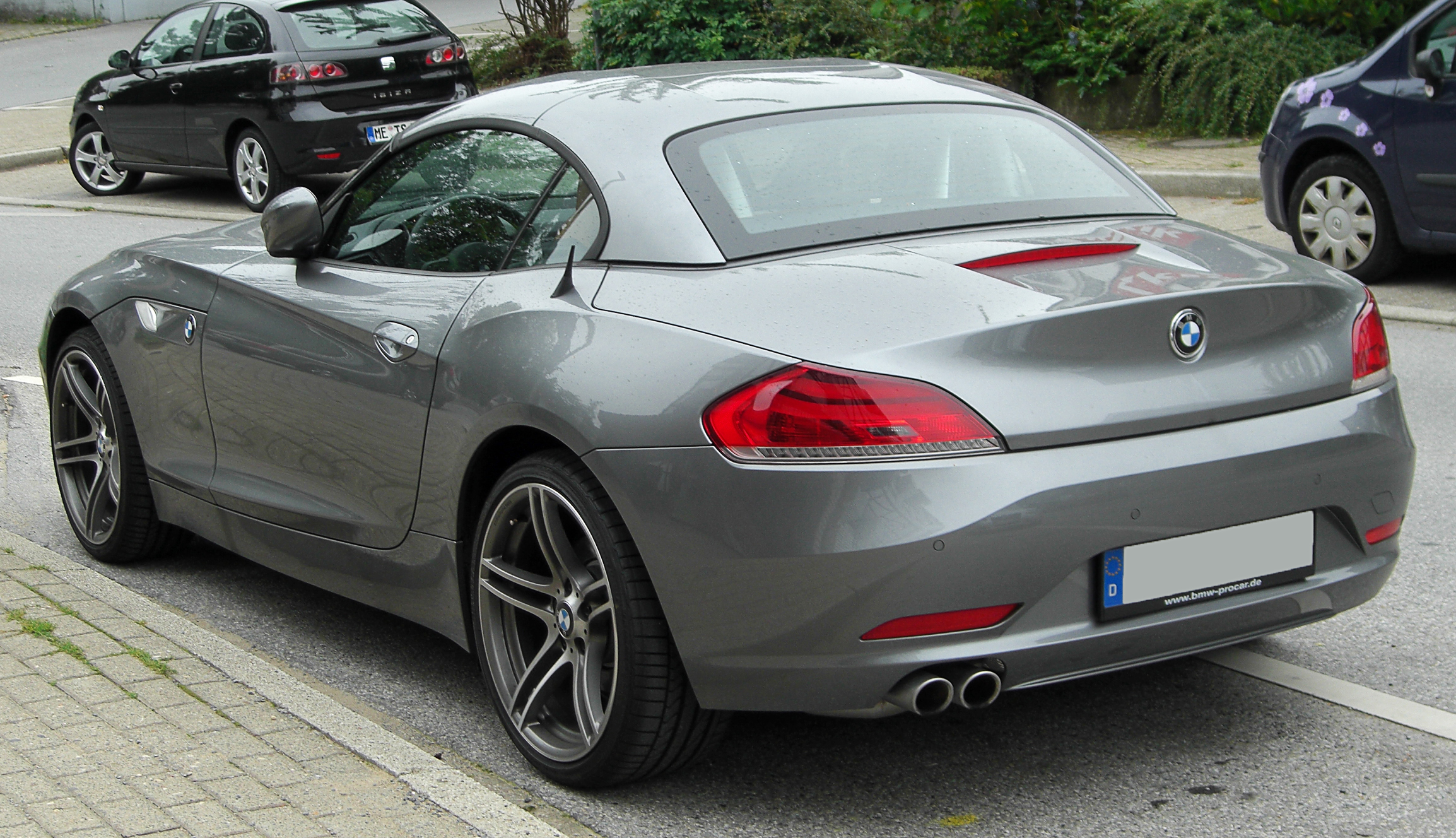
Rear view

The E89 Z4 was offered with the base level sDrive or optional M Sport trim. The M Sport trim included 18-inch alloy wheels, leather upholstery, sports seats, redesigned front and rear bumpers, sports steering wheel and sports suspension. An optional Design Pure Impulse package was also offered, having colour matching Alcantara or Nappa leather, and BMW Individual anthracite roof lining.

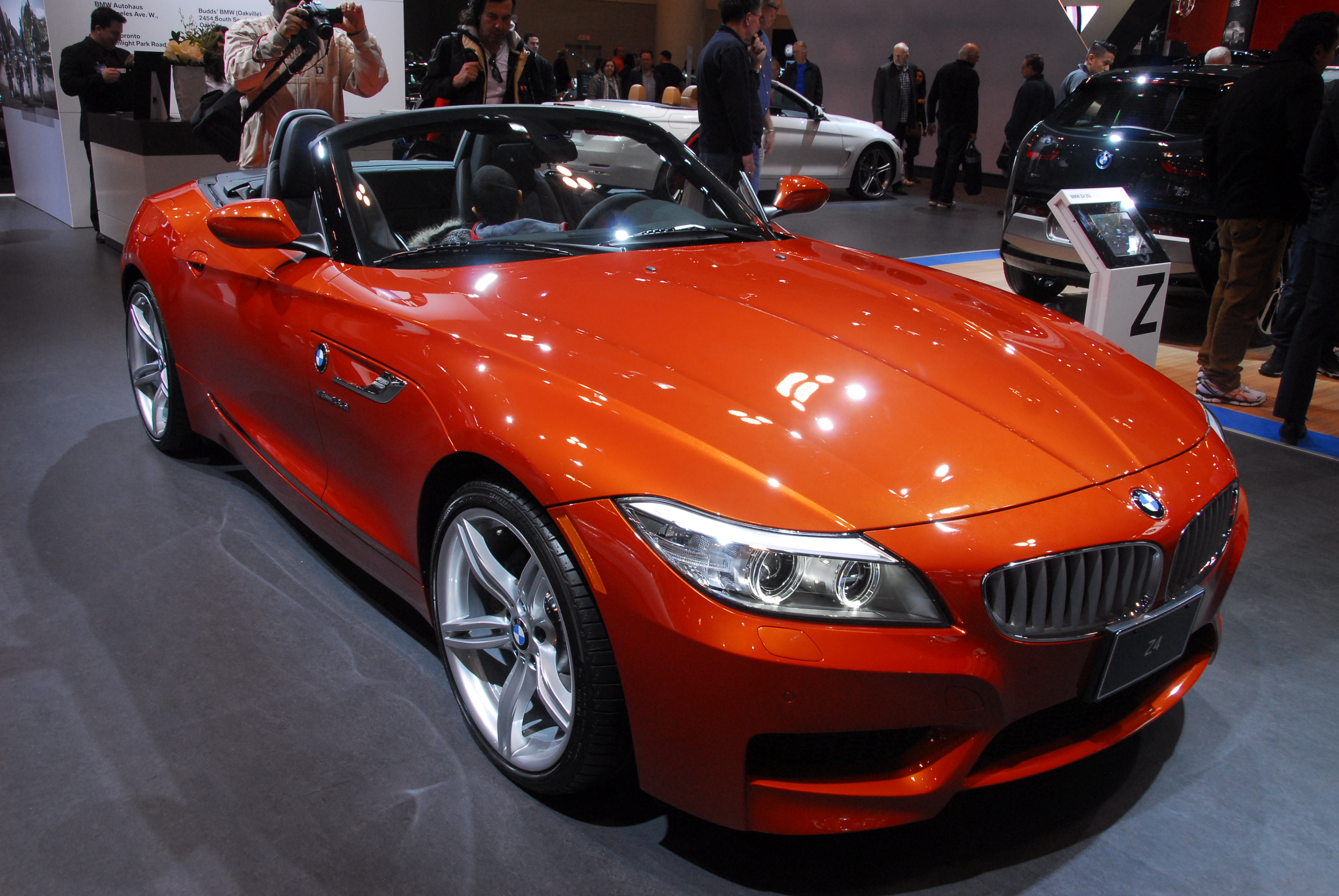
BMW E89 Z4 (post facelift model finished in Valencia Orange)

The 2013 facelift also introduced the Design Pure Traction and Pure Fusion Design package, which had the choice of the exclusive Valencia Orange and Sparkling Brown metallic paintwork respectively (alongside regular colours), and colour matching interior design elements. The Design Pure Traction package also featured a black hardtop roof.

== Equipment ==
The E89 Z4 came standard with BMW EfficientDynamics technologies, such as regenerative braking and electric power steering. Models also feature an electric parking brake, engine start-stop system, directional headlights, and a driving mode selector with Comfort, Sport, and Sport+ modes which adjust throttle and gearbox behaviour, power steering weighting, and the adjustable dampers (with the optional 'Electronic Damper Control'). The models could also be ordered with the iDrive infotainment system with BMWConnected services and keyless entry.

== Transmissions ==
The available transmissions are:

- 6-speed manual Getrag GS6-17BG (Z4 18i / 20i / 23i / 28i / 30i)
- 6-speed manual ZF GS6-53BZ (Z4 35i)
- 6-speed automatic ZF 6HP 19 (Z4 23i / 30i)
- 8-speed automatic ZF 8HP45 (Z4 18i / 20i / 28i)
- 7-speed dual-clutch Getrag GS7-D36SG (Z4 35i / 35is)

== Models ==
Since the summer of 2013, all Z4 models met Euro 6 (EU6) exhaust emission standards.

No diesel or all-wheel drive (xDrive) models were offered for the E89 Z4.

| Model | Years | Engine | Power | Torque | 0–100 km/h Man [Auto] |
|---|---|---|---|---|---|
| sDrive18i | 2013–2016 | 2.0 L N20 turbo I4 | 115 kW (156 PS; 154 hp) at 5,000 rpm | 240 N⋅m (177 lb⋅ft) at 1,250–4,400 rpm | 8.1 s |
| sDrive20i | 2011–2016 | 2.0 L N20 turbo I4 | 135 kW (184 PS; 181 hp) at 5,000–6,250 rpm | 270 N⋅m (199 lb⋅ft) at 1,250–4,500 rpm | 6.9 s |
| sDrive23i | 2009–2011 | 2.5 L N52 I6 | 150 kW (204 PS; 201 hp) at 6,400 rpm | 250 N⋅m (184 lb⋅ft) at 2,750 rpm | 6.6 s [7.3 s] |
| sDrive28i | 2011–2016 | 2.0 L N20 turbo I4 | 180 kW (245 PS; 241 hp) at 5,000–6,500 rpm | 350 N⋅m (258 lb⋅ft) at 1,250–4,800 rpm | 5.7 s |
| sDrive30i | 2009–2011 | 3.0 L N52B30 I6 | 190 kW (258 PS; 255 hp) at 6,600 rpm | 310 N⋅m (229 lb⋅ft) at 2,600 rpm | 5.8 s [6.1 s] |
| sDrive35i | 2009–2016 | 3.0 L N54 twin-turbo I6 | 225 kW (306 PS; 302 hp) at 5,800 rpm | 400 N⋅m (295 lb⋅ft) at 1,300–5,000 rpm | 5.2 s [5.1 s] |
| sDrive35is | 2010–2016 | 3.0 L N54 twin-turbo I6 | 250 kW (340 PS; 335 hp) at 5,800 rpm | 500 N⋅m (369 lb⋅ft) at 1,500–4,500 rpm | [4.8 s] |

=== Z4 sDrive35is ===
The Z4 sDrive35is is not available with a 6 speed manual. It was only available with a 7-speed dual-clutch transmission (DCT) in the M Sport trim, and uses an upgraded version of the N54 engine shared with the 1 Series M Coupé. The engine has a computer-controlled overboost function for 3rd to 7th gears. The boost function activates after each gear change with full throttle, and lasts for 7 seconds between 1,500 and 4,500rpm. Peak torque during overboost is 500 N⋅m (369 lb⋅ft), compared to 450 N⋅m (332 lb⋅ft) without.

== Concept cars ==
=== Zagato Coupé (2012) ===
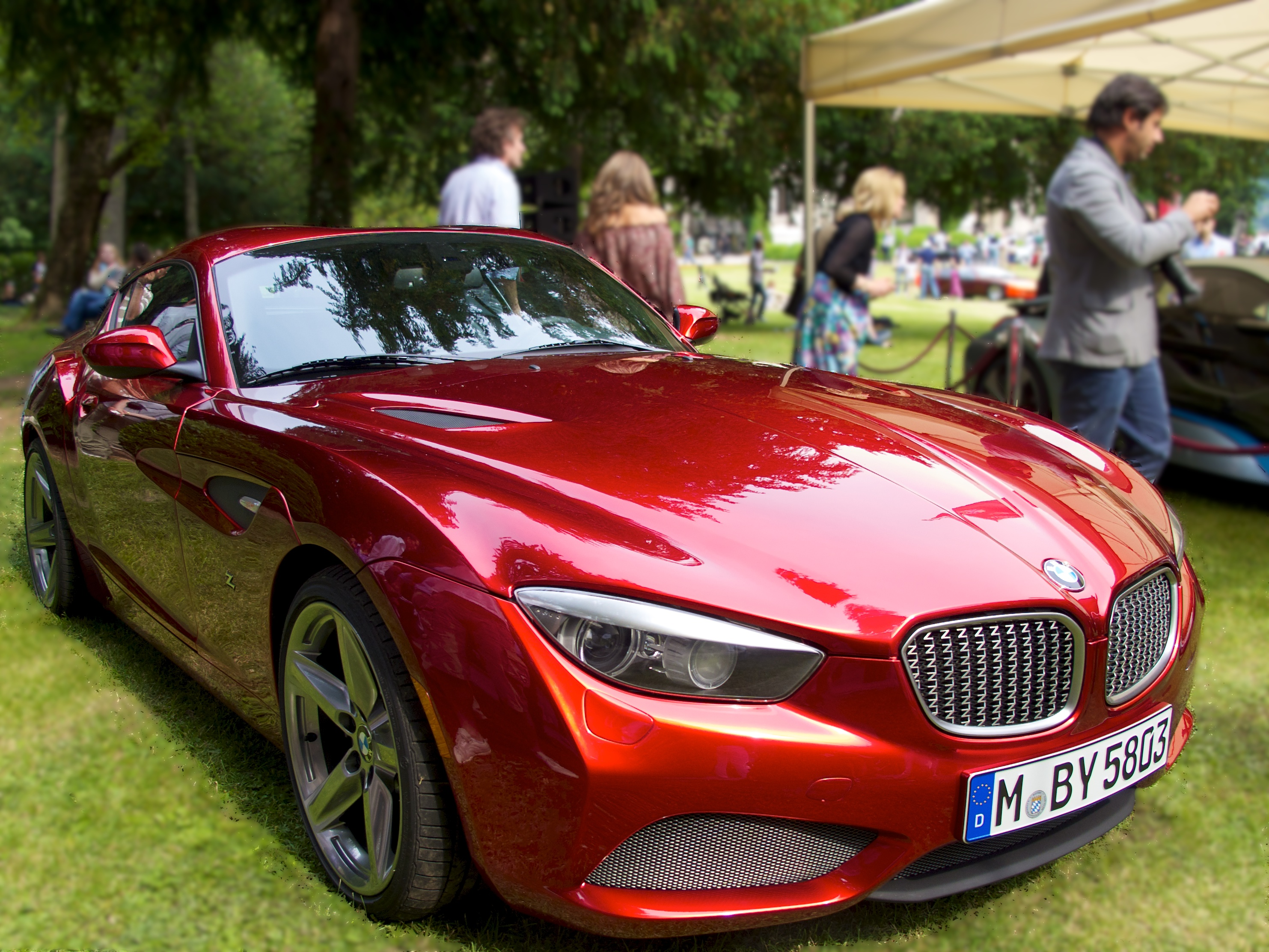
Zagato Coupé in 2012

The Zagato Coupé was a concept car based on the Z4 (E89) developed in collaboration with Italian design house Zagato. It was unveiled at the Concorso d'Eleganza Villa d'Este on 25 May 2012. As the then BMW chief designer Adrian van Hooydonk and Zagato chief designer Norihiko Harada were friends, the decision was quickly made when Andrea Zagato proposed a collaboration with BMW. The body of the Zagato Coupé was built entirely by hand and includes a double-bubble roof and Rosso Vivace paint which changes colour depending on the lighting, ranging from a near black to a bright red. The Zagato Coupé also incorporates the letter "z" in its design, with the kidney grille composed of small matte "z" letters, with "z" letters embroidered into the seats.

=== Zagato Roadster (2012) ===
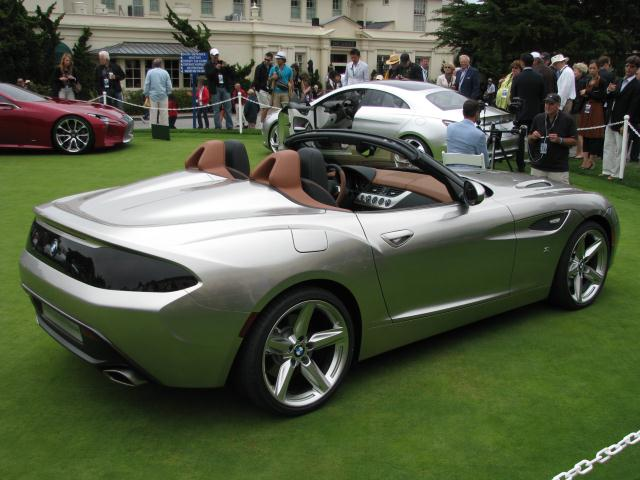
Zagato Roadster (rear view)

The Zagato Roadster was the roadster version of the Zagato Coupé that was unveiled three months earlier, and was introduced at the Pebble Beach Concours d'Elegance on 19 August 2012. The Zagato Roadster was manufactured in six weeks, from the first design idea to the finished model. Similar to the Zagato Coupé, the paint work of the Roadster changes appearance according to the lighting, ranging from dark grey to a light silver. The roadster does away with the retractable hard-top of the Z4 and incorporated a tonneau cover for protection of the interior which incorporates a double-bubble shape. The Zagato roadster has a black interior, with a strip of brown leather trim extending to the roll-over hoops.

== Model year changes ==
=== 2011 ===
- The six-cylinder sDrive23i and sDrive30i models were replaced by turbocharged four-cylinder sDrive20i and sDrive28i models. For the US market, only the sDrive28i was launched.

=== 2012 ===
- The roof mechanism could now be operated at speeds up to 40 km/h (25 mph). Previously only up to 10 km/h (6.21 mph).

=== 2013 facelift ===
The Z4 facelift (also known as LCI) models were introduced in March 2013. Major changes were:

- Redesigned headlights (now using LED lamps) and side indicators.
- Interior changes including black surrounds for the central air vents, and revised higher quality switches, control panel and buttons.
- The introduction of the sDrive18i model introduced, powered by the N20 turbocharged four-cylinder engine generating a power output of 115 kW (154 hp).
- Introduction of the "Pure Balance Design" and "Pure Traction Design" option packages.

== Safety ==
The E89 Z4 comes with electronic stability control, cornering brake control, emergency brake assist, rollover hoops, and airbags for the driver and passenger.

The 2015 Z4 18i received three stars overall in its Euro NCAP test.

Euro NCAP test results BMW Z4 18i, LHD (2015)
| Test | Points | % |
|---|---|---|
| Overall: | 3 /5 stars | |
| Adult occupant: | 26.4 | 69% |
| Child occupant: | 13 | 61% |
| Pedestrian: | 33.1 | 91% |
| Safety assist: | 6 | 46% |

== Production volumes ==
Yearly production volumes for the Z4 (E89) are as follows:

| Year | Total |
|---|---|
| 2009 | 22,761 |
| 2010 | 24,575 |
| 2011 | 18,809 |
| 2012 | 15,249 |
| 2013 | 12,866 |
| 2014 | 10,802 |
| 2015 | 7,950 |
| 2016 | 5,432 |
| Total: | 118,444 |

== Awards ==
- 2009 International Design Excellence Award (IDEA)
- 2009 Eyes on Design Award for best production vehicle
- 2009 Red Dot Design Award
- Scottish Drop Top of the Year 2009

== Motorsport ==
=== BMW Z4 GT3 (2010–2015) ===
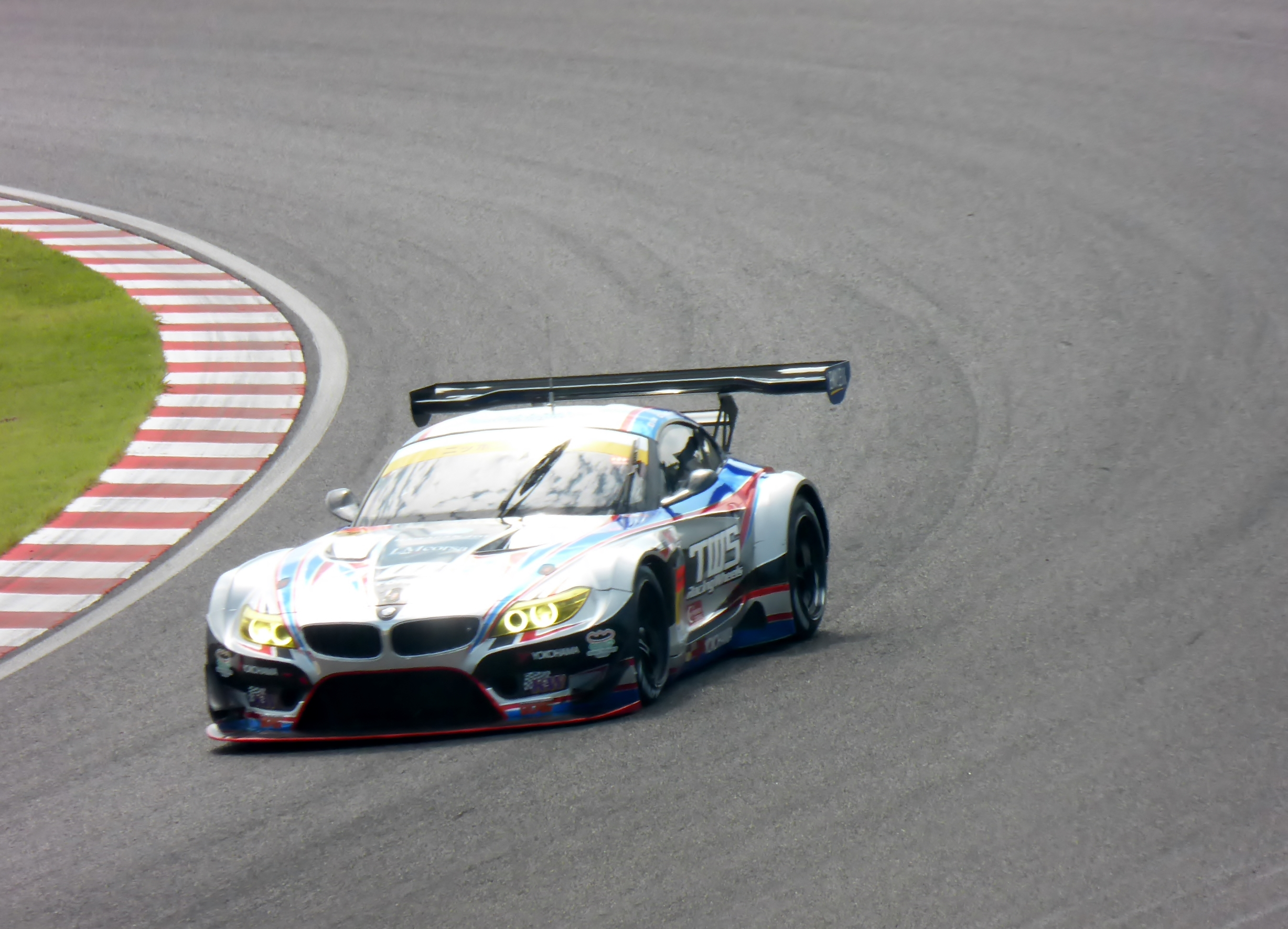
Z4 GT3

The Z4 GT3 was an FIA GT3-specification model available to private teams. It is powered by the P65B44 V8 engine based on the production engine used in the E92 M3 and generates a power output of 384 kW (522 PS; 515 hp). The weight of the Z4 GT3 is approximately 1,190 kg (2,624 lb).

In its 2010 debut season, the Z4 GT3 won the Dubai 24 Hour GT3 endurance event and finished second at the 2011 24 Hours of Spa event by the Need For Speed Team Schubert. The Z4 GT3 achieved several victories in the FIA GT3 Championship and Blancpain Endurance Series.

In the 2011 Super GT season, Nobuteru Taniguchi and Taku Bamba won the GT300 class in a Z4 GT3. Tatsuya Kataoka and Nobuteru Taniguchi repeated this in 2014.

In 2013, the Z4 GT3 finished second at the 24 Hours of Nürburgring.

In 2015, the Z4 GT3 finished first at the 2015 24 Hours of Spa.

In 2016, the Z4 GT3 was replaced by the M6 GT3.

Several years after the car was retired, German racing team Saugmotoren Motorsport announced that they would be entering the Z4 GT3 for a one-off appearance in the 2026 24 Hours of Nürburgring with Ralf Schall, Christian Scherer, Henry Walkenhorst, and team owner Julian Reeh piloting the car. Despite the car's age, it was granted entry into the top SP 9 class against much newer competition.

=== BMW Z4 GTE (2013–2015) ===
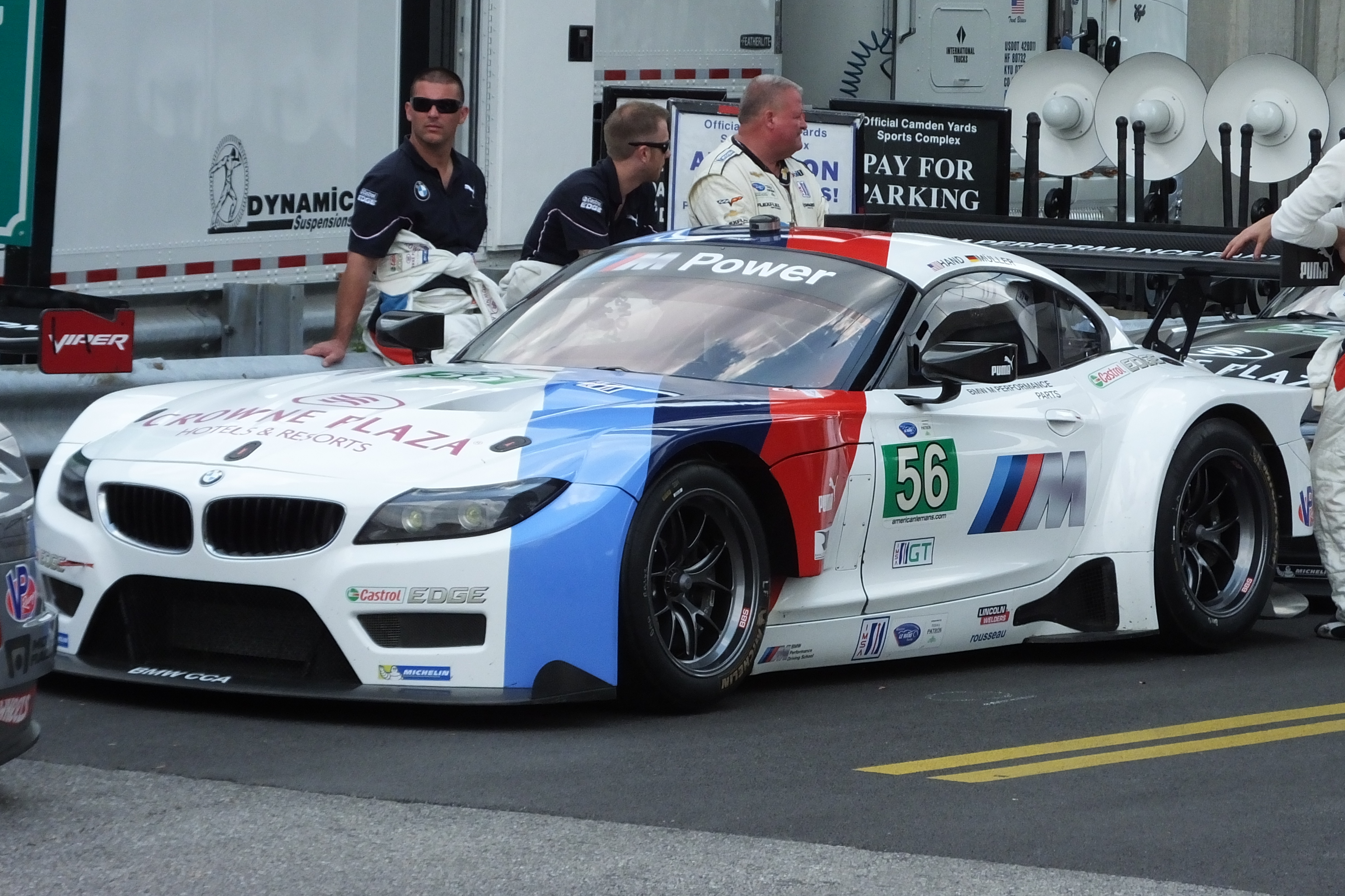
Z4 GTE

The Z4 GTE competed in the GT class of the 2013 American Le Mans Series, the GT Le Mans class of the 2014-2015 United SportsCar Championship and the 2014-2015 European Le Mans Series. It is also powered by the P65B44 V8 engine.

Turner Motorsport won the inaugural 2014 Tudor United SportsCar GT-Daytona Championship with an altered version of the Z4 GT3.
