= Far East Man =

1974 song written by George Harrison and Ron Wood

Song by Ronnie Wood

from the album I've Got My Own Album to Do
- Released: 13 September 1974
- Genre: Rock, soul
- Length: 4:40
- Label: Warner Bros.
- Songwriters: George Harrison, Ron Wood
- Producers: Ron Wood, Gary Kellgren

"Far East Man"

Song by George Harrison

from the album Dark Horse
- Released: 9 December 1974
- Genre: Soul
- Length: 5:52
- Label: Apple
- Songwriters: George Harrison, Ron Wood
- Producer: George Harrison

"Far East Man" is a song written by English rock musicians George Harrison and Ronnie Wood, each of whom released a recording of the song in 1974. Wood's version appeared on I've Got My Own Album to Do, his debut solo album, and Harrison's on Dark Horse. Their only official songwriting collaboration, "Far East Man" is an affirmation of friendship in the face of life's obstacles and musically reflects the two guitarists' adoption of the soul genre. Written mostly by Harrison, the composition has been interpreted as a restatement of the humanitarian message expressed in his 1971 single "Bangla Desh", and a tribute to Indian musician Ravi Shankar.

The song originated during a period of romantic intrigue surrounding Harrison's marriage to Pattie Boyd and Wood's to his wife Krissie, which culminated in Boyd leaving Harrison for his and Wood's mutual friend Eric Clapton. Wood recorded "Far East Man" in July 1974 at The Wick, his Surrey home that had also become an established meeting place for many leading rock musicians. Harrison sang and played slide guitar on this version, while other contributors included Wood's Faces bandmate Ian MacLagan, Mick Taylor of the Rolling Stones, and drummer Andy Newmark. The Harrison recording took place at his Friar Park studio and features backing from Billy Preston, Tom Scott, Willie Weeks and Newmark, all of whom then played on his 1974 North American tour with Shankar. Opening with a spoken dedication to Frank Sinatra, the Dark Horse recording was marred by Harrison's damaged voice – a result of his rushing to complete the album's vocal parts in Los Angeles, while simultaneously rehearsing for the tour.

Several commentators have singled out "Far East Man" as a highlight of Harrison's 1974 album. While noting the two composers' troubled private lives during the song's creation, author Simon Leng describes it as "a wistful shrug of the shoulders set to music". In 2002, Wood released a concert DVD titled Far East Man, which included a live version of the track. Recorded in December 2001, two weeks after Harrison's death from cancer, this performance features Andrea Corr and Slash.

== Background ==
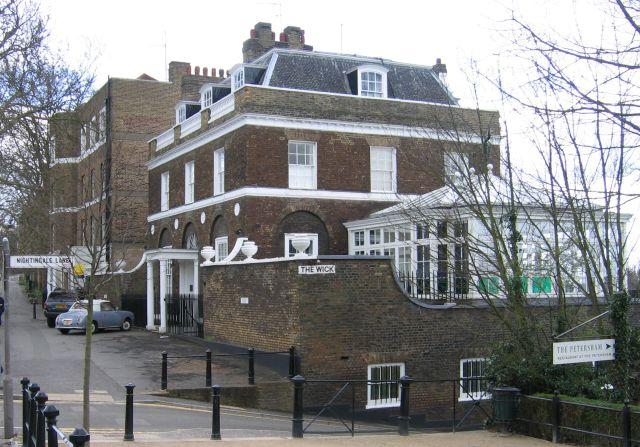
The Wick, in Richmond, Surrey

According to author Robert Rodriguez, "Far East Man" resulted from the "informal musical round robin" that existed in England during the early 1970s among rock music's "elite". From 1972 onwards, guitarist Ronnie Wood's home in Richmond, Surrey – The Wick – was a regular location for these get-togethers, at which the participants included ex-Beatle George Harrison, Eric Clapton, Wood's Faces bandmates, and members of the Rolling Stones. Situated over a bend on the River Thames, The Wick was also where rehearsals took place for Clapton's comeback concerts at the Rainbow Theatre in January 1973. Harrison and his wife Pattie Boyd attended the Rainbow shows, on 13 January, and became friends with Wood and his wife, Krissie.

During this period, Harrison and Wood participated in Alvin Lee's recording of "So Sad", a Harrison composition reflecting the failure of his marriage to Boyd. In October 1973, the Woods stayed at Friar Park, Harrison's estate in Oxfordshire, where he and Wood recorded together. They also began writing "Far East Man", about which Harrison says in his 1980 autobiography, I, Me, Mine: "We stumbled on it and other things ..."

Whatever Ronnie Wood has got to say about anything, certainly about us, it has got nothing to do with Patti or me! Got that?

— Harrison responding to Wood's public announcement of his affair with Pattie Boyd

Beatles biographer Peter Doggett describes Friar Park as having become "a haven of adventurous intrigue" in 1973, with Harrison conducting an affair with Maureen Starkey, the wife of his former bandmate Ringo Starr, and Clapton urging Boyd to leave her husband for him. The romantic entanglements and party lifestyle were reflected in the content of Harrison's subsequent album, Dark Horse, which he likened to the television soap opera Peyton Place. During their stay at Friar Park, Wood began an affair with Boyd and the couple flew to the Bahamas, while Harrison and Krissie Wood holidayed together in Portugal. These details were kept from the press, but in late November 1973, Wood issued a statement from The Wick saying: "My romance with Patti Boyd is definitely on." Given these developments, Rodriguez notes the irony in "Far East Man" being "a rumination on letting a friend down".

The song began as an instrumental collaboration, which Harrison then finished alone. In I, Me, Mine, Harrison recalls that he and Wood came up with the melody to the verses together, but that, at Wood's request, he later turned it into a song by writing the words and adding a middle eight. The title came about because the Faces had just returned from a tour of the Far East and Wood was wearing a T-shirt that carried the slogan Far East Man, a play on the phrase "far out, man". Harrison also says he "brushed up the lyrics a bit" before recording his own version for Dark Horse.

== Composition ==
Harrison biographer Simon Leng describes the chord sequence in "Far East Man" as "a grin-making exploration of major and minor sevenths that oozes smoochy soul". In the view of musicologist Thomas MacFarlane, the sequence "unfolds with such ease" as if in slow motion, and the song evokes an original style beyond its initial debt to soul artists such as Marvin Gaye and Al Green. He cites this as an example of Harrison's pan-cultural style, since the raw elements are Western yet the relaxed delivery conveys "an Eastern approach to worldly matters".

Author Ian Inglis interprets "Far East Man" as being about Indian classical musician Ravi Shankar, at whose request Harrison had staged the Concert for Bangladesh in August 1971. According to Inglis, with the new nation of Bangladesh still beset by problems in 1974, and conflict clouding the issue of friendship generally for Harrison, "this is one friendship he is determined to preserve". The choruses therefore promise: "I won't let him down ... I won't let him drown ..." (Note: Aside from the financial and taxation problems that continued to hold funds from Harrison's aid project in escrow, Bangladesh was experiencing a devastating famine that accounted for up to 1.5 million lives over 1973–74.) Harrison later credited Shankar as "probably the person who has influenced my life the most", since "Indian music was like a stepping-stone to the spiritual path". Inglis views the song as reflecting Harrison's commitment to "all the things that India has given him".

Leng identifies "Far East Man" as a "hopeful song", where, despite his confusion, Harrison's "answer is to follow his instinct, his heart". Leng sums up the conclusion that Harrison provides in the middle eight's final line ("Can only do what it tells me"): "He surveys the problems of love, social strife, and disconnection from spiritual values, but decides that taking his own advice is a good enough start."

While echoing this interpretation, theologian Dale Allison also highlights Harrison's "humanitarian impulse, his regrets about the world's current state, [and] his faint utopian hope for something better" as being evident in the lyrics to "Far East Man". Allison likens the song to Harrison's 1971 compositions "Bangla Desh" and "The Day the World Gets 'Round", and suggests that in the choruses to "Far East Man", Harrison is stating "his determination to help impoverished and oppressed peoples half a world away".

As reproduced in his autobiography, Harrison's original lyrics for the final verse include lines that he changed after recording the song with Wood. Referring to the lyrics in Harrison's version, Allison describes his outlook as offering "a melioristic hope ... that people might be able to make the world a truly better place":

Looks like right here on earth
God, it's hellish at times
But I feel that a heaven's in sight ...

== Ronnie Wood's version ==
=== Recording ===
George Harrison would show up with the Monty Python crew and we'd jam, and the actor John Hurt would show up and eventually we'd all wind up in the pub [nearby] … Day would turn into night and another day, and by then more friends would show up …

— Wood on the convivial atmosphere at his home studio

In Ronnie, his 2007 autobiography, Wood writes that The Wick was "a hive of recording activity as well as a thriving debauchery camp" during the year-long creation of his first solo release, I've Got My Own Album to Do. The album title originated from contributors such as Harrison and Mick Jagger "nagging me to let them go home" and work on their own projects. Wood assisted Jagger in writing and recording the Rolling Stones' 1974 single "It's Only Rock 'n Roll" during this period, and he similarly reciprocated Harrison, by playing on the former Beatle's Christmas single, "Ding Dong, Ding Dong".

The session for "Far East Man" took place at Wood's home studio in July 1974, during the same month that Boyd left Harrison and joined Clapton on tour in North America. According to his recollection in I, Me, Mine, Harrison wrote much of the song's lyrics while driving to Wood's house to record the track. The session was a significant one for Harrison, since it introduced him to the rhythm section he subsequently used on his North American tour with Shankar – bassist Willie Weeks and drummer Andy Newmark. (Note: Wood writes in Ronnie of the American bass player's surprise at encountering Harrison at The Wick: "[Weeks] walked through the kitchen, noticed that George Harrison was there, kept right on walking until he found me somewhere just out of the room and pulled me aside [and said], 'Hey, man, you've got a Beatle in your kitchen.'")

Discussing the song in 2012 on Sky Arts HD's The Ronnie Wood Show, Wood said that Weeks played on the track; however, his 1974 LP credits list Rolling Stones lead guitarist Mick Taylor on bass. The other musicians were Ian MacLagan of the Faces, on electric piano, and Jean Roussel, Cat Stevens' regular keyboard player, on organ. Wood produced the recording with Gary Kellgren, the co-owner of New York's Record Plant studios. (Note: Harrison was especially impressed with Kellgren's work in taping the Concert for Bangladesh shows at Madison Square Garden for the triple live album from the event.)

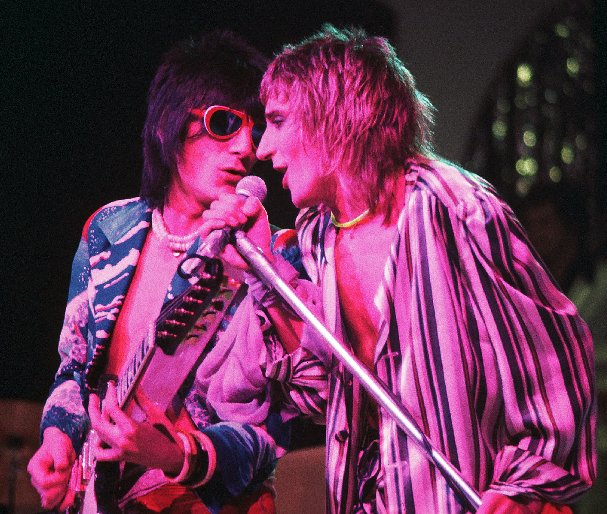
Wood (left) and Rod Stewart performing with the Faces in 1975

Rodriguez describes the musical arrangement on the song as "a slow soul groove" and views Wood's version as "more Harrisonian" than Harrison's later reading. Harrison's slide guitar and harmony vocals are prominent in the mix, but he was only credited for his songwriting contribution. Wood recalled Harrison teaching him the song's vocal parts for "eighteen hours", since Harrison's own singing contribution had to be kept to a minimum in order to satisfy the requirements of "his publishers".

=== Release ===
Warner Bros. Records released I've Got My Own Album to Do on 23 September 1974. "Far East Man" was sequenced as the second track, following Wood's collaboration with Jagger, "I Can Feel the Fire". The album also included contributions from Keith Richards and Faces vocalist Rod Stewart, and was critically well received.

Like Harrison, Wood continued to incorporate soul music in his solo recordings, working with former Valentino Bobby Womack on his 1975 album Now Look. By the time of that album's release, Wood had replaced Taylor in the Rolling Stones, leading to Stewart announcing the break-up of the Faces in December 1975. Although Wood and Harrison never officially co-wrote another song after "Far East Man", their friendship continued, with Wood announcing in 1996 that he and Harrison were recording together. (Note: In January 2000, shortly after Harrison was the victim of a knife attack by an intruder at Friar Park, he and his second wife, Olivia, holidayed with Wood at the latter's property in Ireland.)

The song appears on Wood's career-spanning compilation Anthology: The Essential Crossexion, released in 2006. In their respective reviews for AllMusic and musicOMH, Thom Jurek and Barnaby Smith each identify "Far East Man" as a highlight of the two-disc set.

== George Harrison's version ==
=== Recording ===
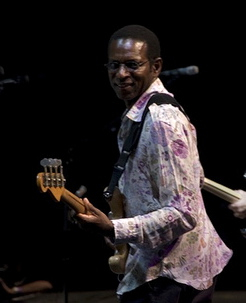
The song was the first of many Harrison recordings to feature bassist Willie Weeks (pictured in 2007).

Harrison taped the basic track for his version of "Far East Man" at Friar Park over August and September 1974. Retaining Newmark and Weeks from the sessions with Wood, he brought in keyboard player Billy Preston and saxophonist and arranger Tom Scott, both of whom would also be part of his all-American tour band. Leng describes "Far East Man" as "the first Harrisong to tap into 1970s soul" and recognises the "supreme soul credentials" of Newmark, as the former drummer with Sly and the Family Stone, and Weeks, whose bass playing on Donny Hathaway's self-titled live album had impressed many rock musicians of the time. (Note: In his pre-tour press conference in October, Harrison cited Weeks' musicianship when dismissing the likelihood of a Beatles reunion, saying he would "rather have Willie Weeks on bass than Paul McCartney".) Newmark later recalled of his and Weeks' first sessions for Harrison: "We were completely thrilled to be asked to play on his record … It was the most exciting thing to happen to me. I had to keep pinching myself to remember it was real."

At the start of the song, Harrison delivers a spoken dedication to Frank Sinatra, adding: "We love you, Frank, and we hope you include this one at Caesars Palace on your next live album." This message referred to Sinatra's adoption of the Harrison composition "Something", which he lauded as "the greatest love song of the past fifty years". (Note: After meeting Sinatra in Los Angeles in October 1968, Harrison had considered offering him "Isn't It a Pity", a song that John Lennon had turned down in 1966 for inclusion on a Beatles release.) MacFarlane recognises the dedication as an example of Harrison breaking the fourth wall between performer and audience, as he immediately draws the listener's attention to "the medium rather than just the musical content".

Harrison played all the guitars on the track, including a slide guitar part. Author Elliot Huntley describes the musical arrangement as "very West Coast" with Scott's "bachelor-pad saxophones" complementing the slide guitar lines, and Preston's electric piano recalling his solo on the Beatles' "Don't Let Me Down". Inglis likens Scott's horn parts to the "soul stylings" of King Curtis, Junior Walker and the Funk Brothers.

Harrison's commitment to his other projects – such as starting up a new record label, Dark Horse Records, and organising Shankar's European concert revue, the Music Festival from India – affected progress on the album. According to authors Chip Madinger and Mark Easter, Harrison had to overdub much of his vocals while in Los Angeles for tour rehearsals, in October. Combined with his having to sing during the rehearsals, the overexertion damaged Harrison's voice, compromising his performance on songs such as "Far East Man". (Note: Rodriguez comments that the effect of Harrison's shot voice on the Dark Horse recording "perversely giv[es] the vocals a resemblance to Wood's".) His throat condition worsened during the subsequent tour, earning Harrison highly unfavourable concert reviews from a number of critics, who objected also to the substantial stage-time afforded Shankar's ensemble.

=== Release ===
Dark Horse was released on Apple Records on 9 December 1974 in the United States, towards the end of the Harrison–Shankar tour. Harrison sequenced "Far East Man" as the penultimate track, between "Dark Horse", the album's lead single in the US, and the pop-bhajan "It Is 'He' (Jai Sri Krishna)".

Given Harrison's marital problems, and the generally unfavourable reception given to his tour and album, author Gary Tillery describes his new relationship with Olivia Arias as "the one bright spot in the problematic year". Having met Arias in Los Angeles in October, Harrison used a photo of her on the face label for side two of the Dark Horse LP. Writing in 1981, NME critic Bob Woffinden viewed the inclusion of this image, combined with the more upbeat message of side-two songs such as "Ding Dong" and "Far East Man", as Harrison ushering in Arias, his future wife, and farewelling Boyd. (Note: In addition to writing coded remarks about Boyd and Clapton in his handwritten sleeve credits for Dark Horse, Harrison listed Wood as "Ron Would If You Let Him" under "Ding Dong".)

=== Critical reception ===
Along with Jim Miller's opinions in Rolling Stone magazine, Woffinden's 1974 album review for the NME was one of the most scathing critiques. Woffinden bemoaned how on Dark Horse, "the radiant light of George's spirituality is planted firmly under a bushel and darkness is not confined to equine matters". He also wrote: "['Far East Man'] seems to have most chance of independent survival, especially as the song turned up in quite pleasant shape on Wood's I've Got My Own Album to Do, but here again the production effectively smothers it, and Harrison's drab vocals complete the assassination."

By contrast, Michael Gross of Circus Raves magazine viewed Dark Horse as the equal of Harrison's acclaimed 1970 triple album All Things Must Pass and praised the song and its arrangement, writing: "Scott again excels on 'Far East Man', with a horn solo that would vindicate any context in which it was put." In a similarly positive assessment for Melody Maker, Brian Harrigan opined that the album "should certainly do a tremendous amount to salvage George's battered reputation" but found the extended playout to "Far East Man" overlong – an example, he said, where "you can have just too much of a good thing". Sue Byrom of Record Mirror said it was her favourite track on Dark Horse, adding that had side one of the LP "contained the variety and progression of the second [side], it would be a great album".

Among more recent commentators, Simon Leng considers "Far East Man" to be among Harrison's best compositions and "one of its writer's most beguiling pieces", while AllMusic's Richard Ginell describes it as "exquisite". Leng admires the "especially attractive" middle eight and views the track as "a musical acceptance of life as an unfathomable riddle … a wistful shrug of the shoulders set to music". Ian Inglis says it typifies the album's erratic quality, since a "lovely melodic passage" in the chorus "is never fully developed elsewhere", although he compares the song favourably with Marvin Gaye's 1971 album What's Going On. In an April 2004 article in Blender magazine, Paul Du Noyer deemed "Far East Man" to be the "standout track" on an album that displayed an "uncharacteristic spell of rock star excess" on Harrison's part.

Reviewing the 2014 reissue of Harrison's Apple catalogue, for Mojo, Tom Doyle describes the song as "the excellently smooth Steely Dan-ish Far East Man". Joe Marchese of The Second Disc writes of the "impeccable" musicianship found throughout Dark Horse and adds: "There are many stellar moments, such as 'Far East Man', with Scott contributing his trademark jazz-rock saxophone on a deliciously fab slice of 'yacht rock'." Blogcritics' Chaz Lipp similarly finds "a lot of rewarding listening" on Dark Horse, and highlights the track as "a smooth soul collaboration with Ron Wood that, once heard, lodges itself in the brain". In his review of the 2014 reissues, for Record Collector, Oregano Rathbone cites "Far East Man" as an example of how each of Harrison's Apple albums after All Things Must Pass "contains shivery moments of release".

== Other versions ==
Before leaving for Los Angeles in October 1974, Harrison performed a portion of "Far East Man" during an interview with BBC Radio's Alan Freeman. Harrison began playing the song, on acoustic guitar, in reply to Freeman asking whether he had felt let down by friends in the past. The interview was broadcast in the UK on Rockspeak, in December, but delayed until September 1975 in America, where it formed part of Freeman's syndicated show Rock Around the World. Along with Harrison's performances of "Dark Horse", "Awaiting on You All" and "I Don't Care Anymore", this recording is available only on bootleg compilations.

Following his troubled tour with Shankar, Harrison's only other tour as a solo artist took place in December 1991, when he and Clapton performed a series of well-received concerts in Japan. In 2002, various Japanese musicians recorded the Harrison tribute album Gentle Guitar Dreams, for which Hiroshi Takano contributed a cover version of "Far East Man". Takano later included it on Tokio Covers, his 2013 collection of cover recordings, released to commemorate his first 25 years as a recording artist.

=== Far East Man live DVD ===
Beginning on 8 December 2001, less than two weeks after Harrison succumbed to cancer at the age of 58, Wood played the song during his shows in Dublin and London, in support of his sixth solo album, Not for Beginners. A live version filmed on 11 December at the Shepherd's Bush Empire, west London, appeared on the 2002 concert DVD Far East Man. Among Wood's band were his son Jessie (on guitar) and daughter Leah (vocals), the latter being Wood's eldest child by his second wife, Jo Karslake.

The performance of "Far East Man" includes guest appearances by Andrea Corr and Slash. Wood introduces the song as "brilliant!", before saying of Harrison: "And we shall miss that man ..." (Note: The following day, Wood filmed an appearance for BBC2's New Year's Eve broadcast of Jools' 9th Annual Hootenanny. At the end of the show, as a tribute to Harrison, he joined host Jools Holland and fellow guests Beverley Knight, Sam Brown and David Gray in a performance of "My Sweet Lord".)

== Personnel ==
Ronnie Wood version

According to the 1974 LP credits (except where noted):

- Ron Wood – lead and backing vocals, electric guitars
- George Harrison – slide guitar, harmony vocal
- Ian McLagan – electric piano
- Jean Roussel – organ
- Mick Taylor – bass
- Andy Newmark – drums

George Harrison version

Adapted from Bruce Spizer's book The Beatles Solo on Apple Records (except where noted):

- George Harrison – lead and backing vocals, rhythm guitar, slide guitar
- Tom Scott – saxophones
- Billy Preston – electric piano
- Willie Weeks – bass
- Andy Newmark – drums, percussion

== Sources ==
- Alagmir, Mohiuddin, Famine in South Asia: Political Economy of Mass Starvation, Oelgeschlager, Gunn & Hain (Cambridge, MA, 1980; ISBN 0-89946-042-9).
- Allison, Dale C. Jr, The Love There That's Sleeping: The Art and Spirituality of George Harrison, Continuum (New York, NY, 2006; ISBN 978-0-8264-1917-0).
- Badman, Keith, The Beatles Diary Volume 2: After the Break-Up 1970–2001, Omnibus Press (London, 2001; ISBN 0-7119-8307-0).
- Bockris, Victor, Keith Richards: The Unauthorised Biography, Hutchinson (London, 1992; ISBN 0-09-174397-4).
- Bonanno, Massimo, The Rolling Stones Chronicle, Plexus Publishing (London, 1990; ISBN 0-207-16940-3).
- Boyd, Pattie (with Penny Junor), Wonderful Today: The Autobiography, Headline Review (London, 2007; ISBN 978-0-7553-1646-5).
- Castleman, Harry & Podrazik, Walter J., All Together Now: The First Complete Beatles Discography 1961–1975, Ballantine Books (New York, NY, 1976; ISBN 0-345-25680-8).
- Clayson, Alan, George Harrison, Sanctuary (London, 2003; ISBN 1-86074-489-3).
- Doggett, Peter, You Never Give Me Your Money: The Beatles After the Breakup, It Books (New York, NY, 2011; ISBN 978-0-06-177418-8).
- The Editors of Rolling Stone, Harrison, Rolling Stone Press/Simon & Schuster (New York, NY, 2002; ISBN 0-7432-3581-9).
- Harrison, George, I Me Mine, Chronicle Books (San Francisco, CA, 2002 [1980]; ISBN 0-8118-3793-9).
- Huntley, Elliot J., Mystical One: George Harrison – After the Break-up of the Beatles, Guernica Editions (Toronto, ON, 2006; ISBN 1-55071-197-0).
- Inglis, Ian, The Words and Music of George Harrison, Praeger (Santa Barbara, CA, 2010; ISBN 978-0-313-37532-3).
- Kahn, Ashley (ed.), George Harrison on George Harrison: Interviews and Encounters, Chicago Review Press (Chicago, IL, 2020; ISBN 978-1-64160-051-4).
- Lavezzoli, Peter, The Dawn of Indian Music in the West, Continuum (New York, NY, 2006; ISBN 0-8264-2819-3).
- Leng, Simon, While My Guitar Gently Weeps: The Music of George Harrison, Hal Leonard (Milwaukee, WI, 2006; ISBN 1-4234-0609-5).
- MacFarlane, Thomas, The Music of George Harrison, Routledge (Abingdon, UK, 2019; ISBN 978-1-138-59910-9).
- Madinger, Chip & Easter, Mark, Eight Arms to Hold You: The Solo Beatles Compendium, 44.1 Productions (Chesterfield, MO, 2000; ISBN 0-615-11724-4).
- O'Dell, Chris (with Katherine Ketcham), Miss O'Dell: My Hard Days and Long Nights with The Beatles, The Stones, Bob Dylan, Eric Clapton, and the Women They Loved, Touchstone (New York, NY, 2009; ISBN 978-1-4165-9093-4).
- Rodriguez, Robert, Fab Four FAQ 2.0: The Beatles' Solo Years, 1970–1980, Backbeat Books (Milwaukee, WI, 2010; ISBN 978-1-4165-9093-4).
- Spizer, Bruce, The Beatles Solo on Apple Records, 498 Productions (New Orleans, LA, 2005; ISBN 0-9662649-5-9).
- Sulpy, Doug & Schweighardt, Ray, Get Back: The Unauthorized Chronicle of The Beatles' Let It Be Disaster, St. Martin's Griffin (New York, NY, 1997; ISBN 0-312-19981-3).
- Tillery, Gary, Working Class Mystic: A Spiritual Biography of George Harrison, Quest Books (Wheaton, IL, 2011; ISBN 978-0-8356-0900-5).
- Townshend, Pete, Who I Am, HarperCollins (London, 2012; ISBN 978-0-00-746603-0).
- Woffinden, Bob, The Beatles Apart, Proteus (London, 1981; ISBN 0-906071-89-5).
- Wood, Ronnie, Ronnie, Macmillan (Sydney, NSW, 2007; ISBN 978-1-4050-3817-1).
