= Ronnie Wood Anthology: The Essential Crossexion =

Compilation album by Ronnie Wood
- Released: 26 June 2006
- Recorded: 1964–2001
- Genre: Rock
- Label: EMI
- Producer: various

Ronnie Wood chronology
Not for Beginners (2001)	Ronnie Wood Anthology: The Essential Crossexion (2006)	The First Barbarians: Live from Kilburn (2007)

Professional ratings
Review scores
Source	Rating
AllMusic	4.5/5 stars
musicOMH	3/5 stars
PopMatters	8/10 stars

Ronnie Wood Anthology: The Essential Crossexion is the first solo compilation of Ronnie Wood, which includes solo work and music from Wood's bands The Birds, The Creation, Jeff Beck Group, The Faces and The Rolling Stones.

== Track listing ==
=== CD 1 ===
1. "I Can Feel the Fire" (Ronnie Wood)
2. "Cancel Everything" (Wood)
3. "Far East Man" (George Harrison, Wood)
  - Tracks 1-3 Album: I've Got My Own Album To Do
4. "Big Bayou" (Gib Gilbeau)
5. "If You Don't Want My Love" (Bobby Womack)
  - Tracks 4-5 Album: Now Look
6. "1234" (Wood)
7. "Fountain of Love" (Wood)
  - Tracks 6-7 Album: 1234
8. "Seven Days" (Bob Dylan)
  - Track 8 Album: The 30th Anniversary Concert Celebration
9. "Always Wanted More" (Wood, Bernard Fowler)
10. "Breathe on Me" (Wood)
11. "Somebody Else Might" (Wood, Fowler)
12. "Josephine" (Wood, Fowler)
  - Tracks 9-12 Album: Slide On This
13. "Testify" (George Clinton, Deron Taylor)
  - Track 13 Album: Slide on Live: Plugged in and Standing
14. "Whadd'ya Think" (Wood)
15. "This Little Heart" (Wood)
  - Tracks 14-15 Album: Not for Beginners
16. "Little Mixed Up" (Wood)
17. "You Strum and I'll Sing" (Wood)
  - Tracks 16-17 Previously unreleased

=== CD 2 ===
1. "You're on My Mind"
2. "You Don't Love Me (You Don't Care)" (Ellas McDaniel)
3. "No Good Without You Baby"
4. "How Can It Be"
  - Tracks 1-4 Artist: The Birds
5. "Midway Down"
6. "Girls Are Naked"
  - Tracks 5 & 6 Artist: The Creation
7. "I Ain't Superstitious"
8. "All Shook Up"
9. "Plynth (Water Down the Drain)"
10. "Jailhouse Rock"
  - Tracks 7-10 Artist: Jeff Beck Group
11. "Flying"
12. "Gasoline Alley"
13. "Miss Judy's Farm"
14. "Too Bad"
15. "Maggie May"
16. "Stay with Me"
17. "Every Picture Tells a Story"
  - Tracks 12-15-17 Artist: Rod Stewart
18. "Ooh La La"
  - Tracks 11-13-14-16-18 Artist: The Faces
19. "Everything Is Turning to Gold"
20. "Black Limousine"
  - Tracks 19 & 20 Artist: The Rolling Stones
