= The First Barbarians: Live from Kilburn =

Live album by Ronnie Wood
- Released: 22 October 2007
- Recorded: 14 July 1974
- Venues: Kilburn Gaumont State Theatre, London, England
- Genre: Rock
- Label: Wooden Records

Ronnie Wood chronology
Ronnie Wood Anthology: The Essential Crossexion (2006)	The First Barbarians: Live from Kilburn (2007)	I Feel Like Playing (2010)

The First Barbarians: Live from Kilburn is a concert album plus DVD by Ronnie Wood and band. The material was recorded and filmed in July 1974 at one of two performances at London's Kilburn Gaumont State Theatre to promote Wood's album I've Got My Own Album to Do.

At the time of the concert the band was billed as Woody and Friends. The name First Barbarians is an allusion to The New Barbarians, the band Wood put together for a six-week tour in 1979, whose lineup included three of the musicians who played at the July 1974 Kilburn gigs (Wood, Keith Richards and Ian McLagan).

== Track listing ==
=== CD ===
1. "Intro" - instrumental
2. "Am I Grooving You" (Bert Russell, Jeff Barry)
3. "Cancel Everything" (Ronnie Wood)
4. "Mystifies Me" (Wood) - with Rod Stewart sharing vocals
5. "Take a Look at the Guy" (Wood) - with Rod Stewart vocals
6. "Act Together" (Jagger, Richards)
7. "Shirley" (Wood)
8. "Forever" (Wood)
9. "Sure the One You Need" (Jagger, Richards) - Keith Richards on lead vocals
10. "I Can't Stand the Rain" (Don Bryant, Ann Peebles, Bernard Miller)
11. "Crotch Music" (Willie Weeks) - instrumental
12. "I Can Feel the Fire" (Wood)

=== DVD ===
1. "Intro"
2. "Am I Grooving You"
3. "Cancel Everything"
4. "If You Gotta Make a Fool of Somebody" (Rudy Clark) - with Rod Stewart sharing vocals
5. "Mystifies Me"
6. "Take a Look at the Guy"
7. "Act Together"
8. "Shirley"
9. "Forever"
10. "Sure the One You Need"
11. "Crotch Music"
12. "I Can Feel the Fire"

== Personnel ==
- Ronnie Wood – guitar, vocals
- Keith Richards – guitar, piano, vocals
- Willie Weeks – bass guitar
- Ian McLagan – piano, organ
- Andy Newmark – drums
- Rod Stewart – vocals on Mystifies Me and If You Gotta Make a Fool of Somebody
