= Hal Goldstein =

American musician

Hal Goldstein (aka Hal G, Hal Gold) is an American multi-instrumentalist, and has played, toured, collaborated, taught or jammed with Roy Buchanan, Laura Nyro, Bobby Keys, Chuck Berry, Ian McLagan, Eddie Kendrick, David Ruffin, John Lee Hooker, Jimmy Vivino, Jamie Glaser, Adrian Belew, Paul Shaffer, Vince Colaiuta, Lenny White, Allston Funk Band, Shelter, Randy Coven, Felix Cavaliere, Jerry Lee Lewis, Martha Reeves, Wilson Pickett, John Sebastian, Ben E. King, Gary U.S. Bonds, The Coasters, Lesley Gore, Lou Christie, The Shirelles, Edgar Winter, Ron Wood and Bo Diddley (Live At The Ritz) as well as the U.S., Europe and Japan Gunslingers tour of 1987 and 1988), and Tommy James.

Goldstein has thousands of original tracks published and retired from TV composing in 2021 and from performing live in 2012.

As a composer, Hal Goldstein is an eight time SESAC TV And Film award winner.

== List of SESAC Film And TV Awards ==
- 2007 - Dateline NBC, Maury, Montel
- 2008 - Maury, Montel, Teen Kids News
- 2009 - Maury
- 2010 - Maury
- 2011 - Dateline NBC, Maury
- 2012 - Dateline NBC, Maury
- 2013 - 48 Hours, Maury
- 2014 - Maury
