= Karslake =

Karslake is a surname, and may refer to:

- Edward Karslake (1820–1892), British Conservative Party politician
- John Burgess Karslake (1821–1881), English lawyer and politician
- John Karslake Karslake (died 1872), New Zealand politician
- Paul Karslake (1958–2020), English artist
