= Gimme Some Neck =

Studio album by Ron Wood
- Released: 20 April 1979
- Recorded: January–March 1978, October–December 1978
- Studios: Pathé Marconi, Paris, France; Cherokee, Los Angeles, California
- Genre: Rock
- Label: Columbia
- Producer: Roy Thomas Baker

Ron Wood chronology
| Mahoney's Last Stand (1976) | Gimme Some Neck (1979) | 1234 (1981) |

Gimme Some Neck is the third solo album by English musician Ron Wood, released in 1979. It was a minor hit and is his best performance on the US charts as a solo artist to date, peaking at number 45 on the Billboard 200 during a 13-week chart run. The album artwork features illustrations drawn by Wood, with a self-portrait in the center of the front side.

To tour the United States in support of the album, Wood formed the New Barbarians with musicians including Keith Richards, Ian McLagan and Bobby Keys, all of whom contributed to the recording. The Landover concert from this tour was recorded and released as Buried Alive: Live in Maryland in 2006.

== Critical reception ==
Professional ratings
Review scores
| Source | Rating |
|---|---|
| AllMusic | 4.5/5 stars |
| Christgau's Record Guide | B− |
| MusicHound Rock | 2.5/5 stars |
| The New Rolling Stone Record Guide | 2/5 stars |

Newsday wrote that "there is no first-rate rock and roll playing of any kind ... the songs are mostly bland filler."

== Track listing ==
All tracks composed by Ron Wood; except where noted.

Side one

1. "Worry No More" (Jerry Lynn Williams) – 2:34
2. "Breakin' My Heart" – 4:17
3. "Delia" (Traditional) – 0:42
4. "Buried Alive" – 3:37
5. "Come to Realise" – 3:52
6. "Infekshun" – 4:03

Side two

1. "Seven Days" (Bob Dylan) – 4:10
2. "We All Get Old" – 4:09
3. "F.U.C. Her" – 3:15
4. "Lost and Lonely" – 4:14
5. "Don't Worry" – 3:26

== Personnel ==
- Ron Wood – lead vocals, guitar, pedal steel, Dobro, bass
- Keith Richards – guitar, backing vocals
- Dave Mason – guitar
- Robert Popwell – bass
- Harry Phillips – piano
- Jerry Lynn Williams – piano and backing vocals on "Worry No More"
- Ian McLagan – keyboards
- Bobby Keys – tenor saxophone on "Don't Worry"
- Mick Jagger – backing vocals
- Jon Lind – backing vocals
- Charlie Watts – drums
- Mick Fleetwood – drums on "Seven Days"
- Jim Keltner – percussion

Technical

- Geoff Workman – engineer
- Tony Lane – design
- Ron Wood – paintings

Studio and road crew

- Royden "Chuch" Magee
- Gary Schultz
- Ernest Cain Salgado
- Johnny Starbuck

== Charts ==
| Chart (1979) | Position |
|---|---|
| Australia (Kent Music Report) | 91 |
| US Billboard 200 | 45 |
