= Mark Wells (musician) =

Australian musician and record producer (born 1973)

Mark Wells (born 22 April 1973) is an Australian born musician and record producer, best known as the bass player for The Ronnie Wood Band, and the founding member of Twenty Two Hundred.

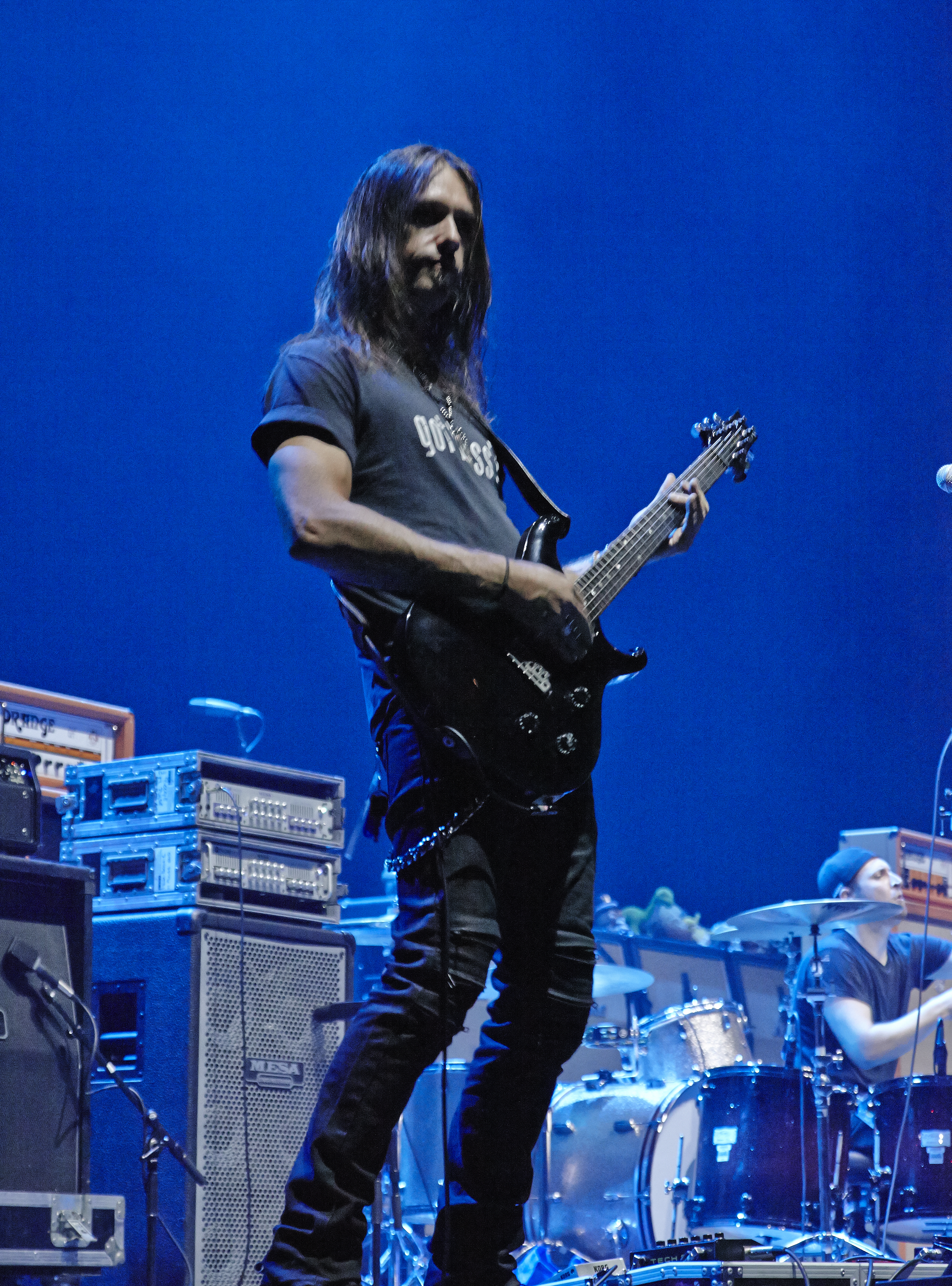
MarkwellsGlasgow 664

In 2001, Wells produced the album Not For Beginners by the Rolling Stones guitarist Ronnie Wood (SPV/Steamhammer).

Wells was the bass player for The Ronnie Wood Band from 2001 to 2002. He appeared on the live DVD "Ronnie Wood - Far East Man".

In 2006, Wells won a Queensland Q Music award for his song "Plausible Deniability" (performed by Monkeybone) in the category of "Punk and Metal".

He is the forming member, songwriter, bass player and guitarist for the Australian rock band Twenty Two Hundred who formed in 2010. He produced and mixed the band's debut EP "Eleven" in 2010, and he produced the band's debut album, Carnaval De Vénus in 2013. (Tonequake Records).

In 2022 Wells worked with Jimmy Hayward on the Jim Carrey lighthouse keeper cartoon that Jim used to quit Twitter.

Mark Wells is Los Angeles based.
