= 1234 (Ronnie Wood album) =

Studio album by Ronnie Wood
- Released: 2 September 1981
- Recorded: April–May 1981
- Studio: Chateau Recorders, Hollywood; Record Plant, Los Angeles; Mattress Sound, Mandeville Canyon, Los Angeles
- Genre: Rock
- Label: Columbia
- Producer: Ron Wood, Andy Johns

Ronnie Wood chronology
Gimme Some Neck (1979)	1234 (1981)	Live at the Ritz (1988)

1234 is the fourth solo album by English musician Ronnie Wood, released in September 1981. In the United States, it spent five weeks on the Billboard 200, peaking at number 164. The album was co-produced by Andy Johns and features musical contributions from Ian McLagan, Charlie Watts, Bobby Womack, Waddy Wachtel and Nicky Hopkins, among others.

Professional ratings
Review scores
Source	Rating
AllMusic	2.5/5 stars
The Rolling Stone Album Guide	3/5 stars

== Track listing ==
1. "1234" (Ronnie Wood)
2. "Fountain of Love" (Wood, Jim Ford)
3. "Outlaws" (Wood, Ford)
4. "Redeyes" (Wood; inspired by Mick Jagger)
5. "Wind Howlin' Through" (Wood)
6. "Priceless" (Wood, Bobby Womack; arranged by Rod Stewart)
7. "She Was Out There" (Wood)
8. "Down to the Ground" (Wood)
9. "She Never Told Me" (Wood, Ford)

== Personnel ==
- Ronnie Wood – vocals, guitar (2, 3, 4, 6, 7, 9), bass (1, 4, 9, dobro (4), piano (7), keyboards (9)
- Bobby Womack – 12-string guitar (2), bass (2)
- Waddy Wachtel – acoustic guitar (9)
- Robin Le Mesurier – guitar (6)
- Jimmy Haslip – bass (8, 9)
- Jay Davis – bass (6)
- Ian McLagan – electric piano (2), organ (3, 7, 8), keyboards (9)
- Nicky Hopkins – piano (3, 4, 6), keyboards (9)
- Bobby Keys – saxophone (1)
- Jim Horn – saxophone (1)
- Steve Madaio – saxophone (1)
- Sherlie Matthews – backing vocals (2)
- Clydie King – backing vocals (2, 6)
- Anita Pointer – backing vocals (3, 9)
- Jimmy Z – harmonica
- Alvin Taylor – drums (1)
- Ian Wallace – drums (2, 3, 8)
- Charlie Watts – drums (4, 7, 9)
- Alan Myers – drums (5)
- Carmine Appice – drums (6)
- Jim Keltner – percussion (1, 7, 9)

Technical

- Karat Faye – second engineer
- Ronnie Wood – artwork, drawings
