= The New Barbarians (band) =

UK musical group

The New Barbarians, known as The Barbarians, was an English rock band that played two concerts in Canada, eighteen shows across the United States in April and May 1979 and one show on January 16, 1980. In August 1979, the band also supported Led Zeppelin at the Knebworth Festival 1979.

The group was formed and led by Rolling Stones and Faces guitarist Ronnie Wood, primarily to promote his latest LP Gimme Some Neck. Neil Young came up with the name. The line-up included Rolling Stones member Keith Richards, bassist Stanley Clarke, former Faces keyboardist Ian McLagan, Rolling Stones confederate and saxophonist Bobby Keys and drummer Zigaboo Modeliste of The Meters. For the Knebworth show Clarke was replaced on short notice by bassist Phil Chen, who had to learn all the songs in one day.

The band played a mix of classic rock & roll, R&B, blues and country music, along with Ron Wood solo material and Jagger/Richards songs. Wood sang lead on most numbers (with Richards, McLagan and Clarke providing back-up vocals), as well as playing guitar, pedal steel, harmonica and saxophone.

The New Barbarians debuted as the Rolling Stones' support act at two charity concerts to benefit the CNIB at the Oshawa Civic Auditorium near Toronto on 22 April 1979, fulfilling one of the conditions of Richards' 1978 sentence for possession of heroin.

The Barbarians' 18-gig US tour followed. In advance of their April 29 concert in Milwaukee, rumors began to spread that 'special guests' would appear. The list of purported secret guests included Mick Jagger, Bob Dylan, Jimmy Page, Peter Frampton and Rod Stewart. Out of concern over ticket sales, Wood and the promoter helped to spread the rumors. When no extra guests appeared, fans began with catcalls then charged the stage, smashed chairs and broke windows. Police arrested 81 people. A similar, less serious incident, occurred when the band played Madison Square Garden on May 7.

The city of Milwaukee brought suit against the band for damages done to the theater. Wood booked a concert to pay for the damages but, as the band had already broken up, he assembled a new one. When The Barbarians returned to Milwaukee on January 16, 1980, the line-up was Wood, session drummer Andy Newmark, bassist Reggie McBride, and guitarist Johnny Lee Schell, with Mackenzie Phillips on backing vocals.

In October 2006 Ronnie Wood's record label, Wooden Records, released a two-disc CD (followed a few months later by a triple LP set) of a New Barbarians concert at the (now former) Capital Centre in Landover, Maryland, entitled Buried Alive: Live in Maryland.

== Typical set list ==
When The New Barbarians appeared as a support act (at the two Canadian shows and at Knebworth Fair) their performances featured shortened set lists, but most shows on their US tour included:

- "Sweet Little Rock & Roller" (Berry)
- "Buried Alive" (Wood)
- "F.U.C. Her" (Wood)
- "Mystifies Me" (Wood)
- "Infekshun" (Wood)
- "Rock Me Baby" (Broonzy/Crudup)
- "Sure the One You Need" (Jagger/Richards) - Richards on lead vocals
- "Lost and Lonely" (Wood)
- "Breathe On Me" (Wood)
- "Love in Vain" (Johnson)
- "Let's Go Steady Again" (Alexander) - Richards on lead vocals, Wood on saxophone
- "Apartment Number 9" (Paycheck/Austin) - Richards on piano and lead vocals, Wood on pedal steel
- "Honky Tonk Women" (Jagger/Richards)
- "Worried Life Blues" (Merriwether) - Richards on lead vocals
- "I Can Feel the Fire" (Wood)
- "Come to Realize" (Wood)
- "Am I Grooving You" (Russell/Barry) - Wood on harmonica
- "Seven Days" (Dylan)
- "Before They Make Me Run" (Jagger/Richards) - Richards on lead vocals
- "Jumpin' Jack Flash" (Jagger/Richards)

== Discography ==
Albums :

- Buried Alive - Live in Maryland (recorded May 5, 1979) - released 2006
- Wanted Dead or Alive (recorded at Madison Square Garden, May 7, 1979) - released in 2016 as bootleg.

Single :

- New Barbarians - They offer nothing more than ear-to-ear violence! 10" record released 16 April 2016 as limited edition vinyl (Record Store Day), limited to 3,000 copies.
