= Willie Weeks =

American bass guitarist (b. 1947)

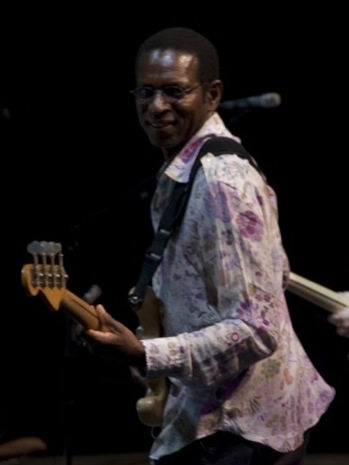
- Weeks performing in the 2007 Crossroads Guitar Festival

Background information
- Born: August 5, 1947 (age 79); Salemburg, North Carolina, U.S.
- Genres: Rock; blues; jazz; blues rock; country
- Occupations: Musician; actor
- Instrument: Bass guitar
- Years active: 1963–present
- Labels: Reprise; Tamla; Polydor; Epic; EMI; Warner Bro.; Atlantic; Capitol; Columbia; EMI; CBS; Elektra

Willie Weeks (born August 5, 1947) is an American bass guitarist. He has gained fame performing with famous musicians in a wide variety of genres. He has been one of the most in-demand session musicians throughout his career. Weeks has also gained fame touring with many of rock's heavyweights throughout his career.

== Career ==
Weeks was born in Salemburg, North Carolina, and began playing the electric bass in the early 1960s. His earliest influences were the country, pop and R&B music he heard on the radio. Weeks counts bassists Ron Carter, James Jamerson, and Ray Brown as early influences.

Weeks has worked in the studio or toured with a wide range of artists, including Gregg Allman, David Bowie, Jimmy Buffett, Kevin Chalfant, Eric Clapton, Hank Crawford, Bo Diddley, The Doobie Brothers, Lou Fellingham, Aretha Franklin, Isaac Hayes, George Harrison, Vince Gill, Donny Hathaway, Etta James, Billy Joel, Wynonna Judd, Chaka Khan, B.B. King, Neil Larsen, Lyle Lovett, Gail Davies, David Lee Roth, Michael McDonald, Don McLean, John Mayer, Bette Midler, Randy Newman, Andy Newmark, Pino Palladino, Boz Scaggs, John Scofield, Carly Simon, Soulive, Rod Stewart, The Rolling Stones, James Taylor, Joe Walsh, Steve Winwood, Bobby Womack, Stevie Wonder, Ronnie Wood and Eikichi Yazawa.

His playing on Donny Hathaway's Live (1972), including a 3½ minute bass solo on "Voices Inside (Everything Is Everything)", which is regarded by many bass players as some of Weeks' best work. He played a 1962 Fender P-Bass through an Ampeg SVT amplifier on the recording (though it had initially been reported that he played through an Ampeg B-15).

Weeks' contributions to the Hathaway album impressed many English rock musicians, leading to his work with Ronnie Wood, The Rolling Stones ("It's Only Rock & Roll"), George Harrison and David Bowie from 1974 onwards. In a press conference for his 1974 North American tour, Harrison cited Weeks' musicianship when dismissing the likelihood of a Beatles reunion, saying he would "rather have Willie Weeks on bass than Paul McCartney".

Weeks played with Ask Rufus, the precursor band to Rufus with Chaka Khan. He appeared on their recording of Al Kooper's song "Brand New Day". Weeks also played with the Fabulous Amazers and Bill Lordan (pre Robin Trower drummer) in the Minnesota group Gypsy. He also played bass guitar for Michael's Mystics back in the 1960s in Minnesota, with Lordan again on drums. That band recorded "Pain" by the Grassroots, a big hit locally for the Mystics.

He also played bass at Clapton's Crossroads Guitar Festival on July 28, 2007 at Toyota Park in Bridgeview, Illinois.

== Equipment ==
In addition to his red 1962 Fender Precision bass, Weeks uses a maple-neck 1958 Precision bass and a 1964 Fender Jazz Bass, as well as a tobacco sunburst Kay four-string acoustic bass for Clapton's "unplugged repertoire". Weeks used a sunburst 1963 P-Bass during Clapton's 2008 European Summer tour. In 2014 he began using his "WW" Willie Weeks signature bass by Bee Basses.

On the 2009 Australasian and British tours, Weeks played Fender, Kay and Alleva Coppolo basses. In 2017, Weeks used a custom-made Alien Audio bass made by Charles "Chopper" Anderson in Nashville.

Weeks appeared in the films Blues Brothers 2000 (in a fictional supergroup along with other musicians he's worked with) and Lightning in a Bottle.

== Discography ==
With Gypsy

- 1971 In the Garden

With Donny Hathaway

- 1973 Extension of a Man

With Herbie Mann

- 1973 Turtle Bay

With Stevie Wonder

- 1973 Innervisions

With Gloria Jones

- 1973 Share My Love

With Splinter

- 1974 The Place I Love

With Aretha Franklin

- 1974 Let Me in Your Life

With Randy Newman

- 1974 Good Old Boys
- 1977 Little Criminals
- 1979 Born Again

With Ronnie Wood

- 1974 I've Got My Own Album to Do
- 1975 Now Look
- 2001 Not for Beginners

With Rod Stewart

- 1974 Smiler
- 1976 A Night on the Town

With George Harrison

- 1974 Dark Horse
- 1975 Extra Texture (Read All About It)
- 1976 Thirty Three & 1/3
- 1979 George Harrison
- 1981 Somewhere in England
- 1982 Gone Troppo

With Don McLean

- 1974 Homeless Brother

With David Bowie

- 1975 Young Americans

With Bobby Womack

- 1975 Safety Zone

With Jorge Calderón

- 1975 City Music

With James Taylor

- 1975 Gorilla
- 1976 In the Pocket

With Carly Simon

- 1975 Playing Possum

With David Cassidy

- 1975 The Higher They Climb
- 1976 Home Is Where the Heart Is

With Terry Garthwaite

- 1975 Terry

With Kenny Vance

- 1975 Vance 32

With Al Jarreau

- 1976 Glow

With Richie Havens

- 1976 The End of the Beginning

With Dianne Brooks

- 1976 Back Stairs of My Life

With Leon Russell and Mary McCreary

- 1976 Wedding Album

With The Miracles

- 1976 The Power of Music
- 1977 Love Crazy

With Maria Muldaur

- 1976 Sweet Harmony

With David Batteau

- 1976 Happy in Hollywood

With Steve Winwood

- 1977 Steve Winwood

With Gregg Allman Band

- 1977 Playin' Up a Storm

With Cher and Gregg Allman

- 1977 Two the Hard Way

With Lenny Williams

- 1977 Choosing You

With The Pointer Sisters

- 1977 Having a Party

With Dan Fogelberg

- 1978 Twin Sons of Different Mothers

With Joe Walsh

- 1978 But Seriously, Folks...

With Richard and Linda Thompson

- 1978 First Light

With Rickie Lee Jones

- 1979 Rickie Lee Jones

With Bette Midler

- 1979 Thighs and Whispers

With The Whispers

- 1979 Whisper in Your Ear

With Adam Mitchell

- 1979 Redhead in Trouble

With Chaka Khan

- 1980 Naughty

With Stephen Bishop

- 1980 Red Cab to Manhattan

With Michael McDonald

- 1982 If That's What It Takes
- 1986 No Lookin' Back
- 2017 Wide Open

With Bill LaBounty

- 1982 Bill LaBounty

With John Mellencamp

- 1983 Uh-huh
- 1989 Big Daddy
- 2001 Cuttin' Heads

With The Doobie Brothers

- 1983 Farewell Tour
- 2011 Live at the Greek Theatre 1982

With Patrick Simmons

- 1983 Arcade

With Rosanne Cash

- 1985 Rhythm & Romance

With Jimmy Buffett

- 1986 Floridays

With William Lee Golden

- 1986 American Vagabond

With Webb Wilder

- 1989 Hybrid Vigor

With Etta James

- 1989 Seven Year Itch
- 1992 The Right Time

With Vince Gill

- 1989 When I Call Your Name
- 1991 Pocket Full of Gold
- 1992 I Still Believe in You
- 1994 When Love Finds You
- 2000 Let's Make Sure We Kiss Goodbye
- 2003 Next Big Thing
- 2013 Bakersfield
- 2016 Down to My Last Bad Habit

With Kenny Rogers

- 1989 Something Inside So Strong
- 1997 Across My Heart

With Marty Balin

- 1991 Better Generation

With Ronna Reeves

- 1991 Only the Heart

With Joan Baez

- 1992 Play Me Backwards
- 1997 Gone from Danger

With Wynonna Judd

- 1992 Wynonna
- 1993 Tell Me Why
- 1996 Revelations
- 1997 The Other Side
- 2000 New Day Dawning
- 2003 What the World Needs Now Is Love

With John Michael Montgomery

- 1992 Life's a Dance

With Tracy Lawrence

- 1994 I See It Now

With Billy Burnette

- 1994 Coming Home

With Chris Norman

- 1994 The Album

With Rodney Crowell

- 1995 Jewel of the South

With Clarence "Gatemouth" Brown

- 1995 Long Way Home

With Peter Cetera

- 1995 One Clear Voice
- 2001 Another Perfect World

With Janis Ian

- 1995 Revenge
- 2000 God and the FBI

With Tanya Tucker

- 1995 Fire to Fire
- 2002 Tanya

With Mac Gayden

- 1995 Nirvana Blues

With Russ Taff

- 1995 Winds of Change

With Lisa Brokop

- 1996 Lisa Brokop

With Dan Hill

- 1996 I'm Doing Fine

With Lari White

- 1996 Don't Fence Me In

With Anita Cochran

- 1997 Back to You

With Mark Nesler

- 1998 I'm Just That Way

With Tara Lyn Hart

- 1999 Tara Lyn Hart

With Sonya Isaacs

- 2000 Sonya Isaacs

With Robert Cray

- 2001 Shoulda Been Home

With Gov't Mule

- 2001 The Deep End, Volume 1

With The Tractors

- 2001 Fast Girl

With Hal Ketchum

- 2001 Lucky Man

With Alicia Keys

- 2003 The Diary of Alicia Keys

With Keb' Mo'

- 2004 Keep It Simple

With Amy Grant

- 2005 Rock of Ages... Hymns and Faith

With JJ Cale and Eric Clapton

- 2006 The Road to Escondido

With John Mayer

- 2006 Continuum

With Eric Clapton

- 2010 Clapton
- 2013 Old Sock

With LeAnn Rimes

- 2013 Spitfire
- 2014 One Christmas: Chapter 1
- 2015 Today Is Christmas
- 2016 Remnants

With Boz Scaggs

- 2013 Memphis
- 2018 Out of the Blues

With Leon Russell

- 2014 Life Journey

With John Oates

- 2014 Good Road to Follow

With Colin James

- 2015 Hearts on Fire

With Mark Ronson

- 2015 Uptown Special

With Cyndi Lauper

- 2016 Detour

With Elizabeth Cook

- 2016 Exodus of Venus

With Ronnie Baker Brooks

- 2017 Times Have Changed

With Gloria Gaynor

- 2019 Testimony

With Wendy Moten

- 2020 I've Got You Covered
