= Paul Karslake =

British painter (1958–2020)

Paul Karslake FRSA (1958 – 23 March 2020) was a British artist, primarily a painter.

== Early life ==
Karslake was born in Basildon, Essex. He studied at SEEVIC College and Southend College of Art and Technology and started working with his father, Michael Karslake, an architectural model-maker working on such projects as Centre Point and the Thames Barrier.

== Artistic career ==
In the early 1970s Karslake was tutored by Sir Peter Scott; towards the end of that decade he met Salvador Dalí during a trip to Spain. Karslake then spent four years in California, working for the LA Art Studios, CBS Television and Disney, with whom he later collaborated on the EuroDisney project. Karslake had numerous solo exhibitions, and became famous for his depictions of celebrities such as the Rolling Stones, Johnny Depp, Michael Caine and Grace Kelly.

He won the Evening Standard Environment Award in April 1990 for hoarding artwork for Wiggins Group plc, and in the same year became a Fellow of the Royal Society of Arts. His patrons included the Turf Club, NABIM, Geronimo Inns, Mohamed Al-Fayed, Keith Richards, Brian May and Yeardley Smith. Commissions in other mediums included design or artwork for the Virgin F1 racing cars, for commercial aircraft, coaches and BBC Radio 1 roadshow trucks. He also tutored at schools and gave demonstrations to art groups. In 2002 Karslake signed for reproduction rights with the Bridgeman Art Library. The Karslake Centre, a centre for arts education, was opened at the Cornelius Vermuyden School and Arts College on 15 September 2005.

In 2009 he gained further exposure for his painting of Ronnie Wood as a vampire, after the latter left Karslake's sister Jo, his then wife, for a younger lover.

== Personal life ==
He was the brother of Jo Wood, former wife of Ronnie Wood of the Rolling Stones.

== Death ==
He died on 23 March 2020 of sudden onset pneumonia, which was caused by COVID-19.
