= Live at the Ritz =

Live album by Ronnie Wood & Bo Diddley
- Released: April 20, 1988
- Genre: Rock
- Label: Victor Records
- Producer: Ronnie Wood and Martin Adam

Ronnie Wood & Bo Diddley chronology
1234 (1981)	Live at the Ritz (1988)	Slide on This (1992)

Professional ratings
Review scores
Source	Rating
AllMusic	2/5 stars

Live at the Ritz is a 1988 live album by Ronnie Wood & Bo Diddley (The Gunslingers). It was a chart hit in Japan, peaking at #40 and selling over 11,000 copies.

It was recorded live at the Ritz, New York, in November 1987.

== Track listing ==
1. "Road Runner" (Ellas McDaniel) - 3:25
2. "I’m a Man" (Ellas McDaniel) - 7:10
3. "Crackin’ Up" (Ellas McDaniel) - 8:37
4. "Hey! Bo Diddley" (Ellas McDaniel) - 2:47
5. "Plynth (Water Down the Drain)" (Ron Wood, Rod Stewart) - 5:01
6. "Ooh La La" (Ron Wood, Ronnie Lane) - 3:54
7. "Outlaws" (Ron Wood, Jim Ford) - 4:12
8. "Honky Tonk Women" (Mick Jagger, Keith Richards) - 4:02
9. "Money to Ronnie" (Ellas McDaniel) - 4:33
10. "Who Do You Love?" (Ellas McDaniel) - 7:48

== Personnel ==
- Ronnie Wood - vocals, guitar
- Bo Diddley - vocals, guitar, drums
- Jim Satten - guitar
- Hal Goldstein - harmonica, drums, keyboards, vocals
- Eddie Kendricks - harmonica, keyboards, vocals
- Debby Hastings - bass, vocals
- Mike Fink - drums
- David Ruffin - vocals
- Sarah Dash - vocals
- Faith Fusillo - vocals
- Carol MacDonald - vocals
