= I Feel Like Playing =

Studio album by Ronnie Wood
- Released: September 28, 2010
- Genres: Blues rock, boogie rock
- Length: 57:43
- Label: Eagle Rock Entertainment
- Producer: Ronnie Wood

Ronnie Wood chronology
The First Barbarians: Live from Kilburn (2007)	I Feel Like Playing (2010)

Professional ratings
Review scores
Source	Rating
AllMusic	3/5 stars
Uncut	3/5 stars
Rolling Stone	3.5/5 stars
American Songwriter	3.5/5 stars

I Feel Like Playing is the seventh studio album by Ronnie Wood.

== Track listing ==
No.	Title	Writer(s)	Length
1.	"Why You Wanna Go and Do a Thing Like That For"	Ronnie Wood	5:28
2.	"Sweetness My Weakness"	Wood, Bernard Fowler	5:46
3.	"Lucky Man"	Wood, Eddie Vedder, Paul Hyde, Bob Rock	5:03
4.	"I Gotta See"	Wood, Fowler	3:44
5.	"Thing About You"	Wood, Billy Gibbons	4:33
6.	"Catch You"	Wood, Fowler, Hyde, Rock	4:05
7.	"Spoonful"	Willie Dixon, add. music Wood, Fowler	5:35
8.	"I Don't Think So"	Wood	5:02
9.	"100%"	Wood, Fowler	4:56
10.	"Fancy Pants"	Wood, Fowler	5:26
11.	"Tell Me Something"	Wood	3:20
12.	"Forever"	Wood	4:45
Total length:			57:43

Japanese bonus tracks
No.	Title	Length
13.	"I Don't Think So (The Early Sessions)"	5:18
14.	"Tell Me Something (The Early Sessions)"	3:16

== Personnel ==
- Ronnie Wood - Vocals, guitar, bass guitar (track 5), harmonica (track 10), keyboards (track 2)
- Slash - Guitar (tracks: 1, 2, 7, 10, 12)
- Bob Rock - Guitar (tracks: 3, 6)
- Billy Gibbons - Guitar (tracks: 4, 5)
- Waddy Wachtel - Guitar (tracks: 8, 9, 11)
- Flea - Bass guitar (tracks: 1, 4, 7)
- Darryl Jones - Bass guitar (tracks: 2, 3, 6, 10, 12)
- Rick Rosas - Bass guitar (tracks: 8, 9, 11)
- Ivan Neville - Keyboards (tracks: 1, 4, 7, 10, 12)
- Ian McLagan - Keyboards (tracks: 3, 6, 8, 9, 11)
- Jim Keltner - Drums (tracks: 1, 3, 4, 6, 7, 10, 12)
- Steve Ferrone - Drums (tracks: 2, 5, 8, 9)
- Johnny Ferraro - Drums (tracks: 11)
- Bernard Fowler - Backing vocals (tracks: 2, 3, 5, 6, 8, 9, 11), vocals (tracks: 4, 7, 12)
- Blondie Chaplin - Backing vocals (tracks: 3, 5, 8)
- Bobby Womack - Backing vocals (tracks: 3, 5, 8, 12)
- Kevin Gibbs - Backing vocals (tracks: 11)
- Saranella Bell - Backing vocals (tracks: 11)
- Skip McDonald - Backing vocals (tracks: 11)

=== Production ===
- Arranged by (Strings) – Karl Eagan
- Engineers – Eddie Delana, Jun Murakawa, Martin Pradler
- Assistant engineers – Brian Capello, Charlie Paakkari, Doug Tyo, Jimmy Fahey, John Cornfield, Kenny Eisennagel
- Mastered by – Steve Marcussen
