= Live & Eclectic =

Live and Eclectic

Live album by Ronnie Wood
- Released: April 3, 2000
- Recorded: November 2, 1992 at Electric Lady Studios, New York City; November 16, 1992 at the Rhythm Café, San Diego, California
- Genre: Rock
- Label: Burning Airlines

Ronnie Wood chronology
Slide on Live: Plugged in and Standing (1993)	Live and Eclectic (2000)	Not for Beginners (2001)

Professional ratings
Review scores
Source	Rating
Allmusic	3.5/5 stars

Live and Eclectic is the second solo live album by Ronnie Wood released in 2000. It was recorded in 1992 at the Electric Lady Studios in New York and at the Rhythm Café in San Diego.

It's from the same tour as his previous live album Slide on Live: Plugged in and Standing

== Track listing ==
1. "Show Me" (Jerry Williams)
2. "Flying" (Ronnie Wood, Rod Stewart, Ronnie Lane)
3. "Testify" (George Clinton, Deron Taylor)
4. "Pretty Beat Up" (Mick Jagger, Keith Richards, Ron Wood)
5. "Always Wanted More" (Ronnie Wood, Bernard Fowler)
6. "Breathe on Me"(Ronnie Wood)
7. "Silicone Grown" (Ronnie Wood, Rod Stewart)
8. "Black Limousine" (Mick Jagger, Keith Richards, Ronnie Wood)
9. "Little Red Rooster" (Willie Dixon)
10. "Stay With Me" (Ronnie Wood, Rod Stewart)
11. "Josephine" (Ronnie Wood, Bernard Fowler)
12. "I'm Losing You" (Norman Whitfield, Eddie Holland, Cornelius Grant)
13. "It's Only Rock 'n Roll" (Mick Jagger, Keith Richards)

=== Bonus CD ===
1. "Flying" (Ronnie Wood, Rod Stewart, Ronnie Lane)
2. "Silicone Grown" (Ronnie Wood, Rod Stewart)
3. "Stay With Me" (Ronnie Wood, Rod Stewart)
4. "Somebody Else (Give Me Up)" (Ronnie Wood, Bernard Fowler)
5. "I Can Feel the Fire" (Ronnie Wood)

== Personnel ==
- Ronnie Wood - vocals, guitar, harmonica
- Johnny Lee Schell - guitar
- Shaun Solomon - bass
- Bernard Fowler - vocals
- Ian McLagan - keyboards
- Chuck Leavell - additional keyboards except on "Josephine", "I'm Losing You" and "It's Only Rock 'n Roll"
- Wayne P. Sheehy - drums
