= Slide on Live: Plugged in and Standing =

Slide On Live: Plugged in and Standing

Live album by Ronnie Wood
- Released: September 28, 1993
- Recorded: 31 October, 3 December 1992-14 January 1993
- Genre: Rock
- Label: Continuum Records
- Producers: Ronnie Wood, Bernard Fowler, Eoghan McCarron

Ronnie Wood chronology
Slide on This (1992)	Slide On Live: Plugged in and Standing (1993)	Live and Eclectic (2000)

Professional ratings
Review scores
Source	Rating
Allmusic	link

Slide on Live: Plugged in and Standing is the first solo live album by Ronnie Wood. It was recorded at The Ritz in New York, at the Avalon in Boston and at the Budokan in Tokyo.

The title is a play on Rod Stewart's unplugged album, Unplugged...and Seated on which Wood featured. The album peaked at #89 in Japan selling over 4,000 copies.

== Track listing ==
1. "Testify" (George Clinton, Deron Taylor)
2. "Josephine" (Ronnie Wood, Bernard Fowler)
3. "Pretty Beat Up" (Mick Jagger, Keith Richards, Ronnie Wood)
4. "Am I Grooving You" (Bert Russell, Jeff Barry)
5. "Flying" (Ronnie Wood, Rod Stewart, Ronnie Lane)
6. "Breathe on Me" (Ronnie Wood)
7. "Silicone Grown" (Ronnie Wood, Rod Stewart)
8. "Seven Days" (Bob Dylan)
9. "Show Me" (Jerry Williams)
10. "Show Me (Groove)" (Jerry Williams)
11. "I Can Feel the Fire" (Ronnie Wood)
12. "Slide Inst."
13. "Stay With Me" (Ronnie Wood, Rod Stewart)

== Personnel ==
- Ronnie Wood - vocals, guitar, harmonica
- Johnny Lee Schell - guitar
- Shaun Solomon - bass
- Bernard Fowler - vocals
- Ian McLagan - keyboards
- Chuck Leavell - additional keyboards on "Testify", "Am I Grooving You", "Seven Days" and "Show Me (Groove)"
- Wayne P. Sheehy - drums
