= Not for Beginners =

Studio album by Ronnie Wood
- Released: 19 November 2001
- Genre: Blues rock, boogie rock
- Label: SPV
- Producer: Ronnie Wood, Mark Wells, Martin Wright

Ronnie Wood chronology
Live and Eclectic (2000)	Not for Beginners (2001)	Ronnie Wood Anthology: The Essential Crossexion (2006)

Professional ratings
Review scores
Source	Rating
AllMusic	1.5/5 stars
All-Reviews	3/4 stars
Boston Phoenix	3/4 stars
Rolling Stone	3/5 stars

Not for Beginners is the sixth solo album by Ronnie Wood.

== Track listing ==
All tracks composed by Ronnie Wood; except where indicated

1. "Wayside" – 2:37
2. "Rock 'n Roll Star" (Chris Hillman, Roger McGuinn) – 3:24
3. "Whadd'ya Think" – 2:57
4. "This Little Heart" – 3:39
5. "Leaving Here" (Eddie Holland, Lamont Dozier, Brian Holland) – 3:19
6. "Hypershine" – 3:37
7. "R U Behaving Yourself?" – 3:24
8. "Be Beautiful" – 3:17
9. "Wake Up You Beauty" – 3:19
10. "Interfere" – 4:39
11. "Real Hard Rocker" – 3:08
12. "Heart, Soul and Body" – 3:24
13. "King of Kings" (Bob Dylan) – 3:36

== Personnel ==
- Ronnie Wood – vocals, guitar, producer
- Mark Wells – guitar, bass, drums, vocals, producer
- Bob Dylan – guitar on "Interfere" & "King of Kings"
- Scotty Moore – guitar on "Interfere"
- Jesse Wood – guitar
- Willie Weeks – bass
- Ian Jenning – double bass on "Interfere"
- Mick Jones – guitar, keyboards, director
- Ian McLagan – piano on "Interfere"
- D.J. Fontana – drums on "Interfere"
- Andy Newmark – drums
- Martin Wright – drums, percussion, vocals, producer
- Kelly Jones – vocals
- Leah Wood – vocals
