= The Wick =

Grade I listed house in London, England

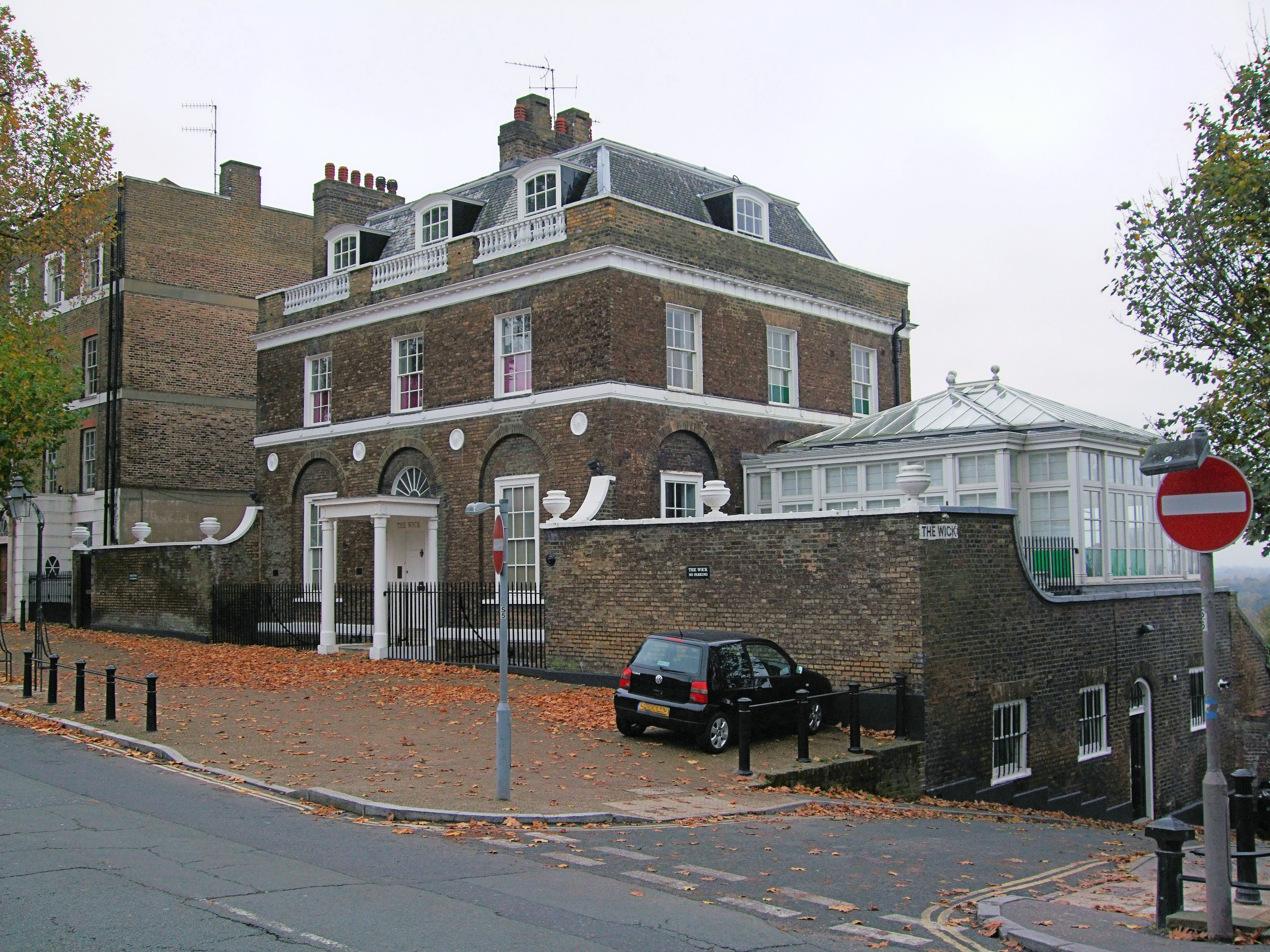
- The Wick on Richmond Hill

- Location within London Borough of Richmond upon Thames

General information
- Type: Residential
- Architectural style: Georgian
- Location: Richmond upon Thames, London, England
- Coordinates: 51°27′06″N 0°17′53″W
- Completed: 1775

Technical details
- Structural system: Brick and stone
- Floor count: 4

Design and construction
- Architect: Robert Mylne

Listed Building – Grade I
- Official name: The Wick and Wick Cottage
- Designated: 10 January 1950
- Reference no.: 1250041

The Wick is a Grade I listed Georgian house in Richmond, Greater London, located at the corner of Nightingale Lane and Richmond Hill. The house, designed in 1775 by architect Robert Mylne for Lady St. Aubyn, was for many years the family home of actor Sir John Mills, who sold it to Ronnie Wood of the rock band Faces (and later of the Rolling Stones) in 1971. From 1996 it was owned by Pete Townshend of the Who, who sold it in 2021 for £15,000,000.

== Description ==
The Georgian-style house, built of plum brick and stone on the site of the Bull's Head tavern, overlooks the River Thames and is near Richmond Park, the largest urban park in the United Kingdom. It was designed by architect Robert Mylne in 1775 for Lady St. Aubyn, and includes oval dining and drawing rooms, three storeys and a basement with modillion, cornice and balustrading above. The porch is built with entablature and Tower of the Winds piers with a fanlight above, and a line of medallions embellishes the front of the house. It faces Richmond Hill and features a garden wall that borders Nightingale Lane, with a coach house in the garden. The back of the house features bow windows that overlook the river.

The Wick and the adjoining cottage, Wick Cottage, are listed as Grade I structures by Historic England.

== History ==
Richmond Hill was part of the Royal Manor of Richmond since the time of Domesday Book. Richmond Park was enclosed by King Charles I around 1635. The countryside was mostly agricultural land in the early 18th century, but Terrace Walk was laid out at the top of Richmond Hill in the later 18th century, followed by construction of a number of fine homes, including The Wick, on the hill.

The sound of the wind around the house reportedly inspired Mary Hayley Bell, actress, writer and wife of Sir John Mills, to write the novel Whistle Down the Wind which was made into both a film and, later, an Andrew Lloyd Webber musical.

Ronnie Wood bought the home in 1971 but did not have enough money to purchase the adjacent cottage as well; he persuaded Ronnie Lane, at the time one of his bandmates in Faces, to buy the cottage. When Wood first bought the house, Lane also lived there until his departure from Faces in June 1973. The guitarist of the Rolling Stones, Keith Richards, reportedly lived in the coach house for several months in 1973–74 during Wood's ownership. Wood recorded his first two solo albums, I've Got My Own Album to Do and Now Look, released in 1974 and 1975 respectively, in a studio he built in the basement of the house. The Rolling Stones song "It's Only Rock 'n' Roll (But I Like It)", also released in 1974, was written at the house, emerging out of a jam between Wood, Richards, David Bowie and Mick Jagger.

Pete Townshend purchased the property in 1996.

Writer and musician Nikki Sudden was working on a history of The Wick before he died suddenly in 2006.
