= Slide on This =

Studio album by Ronnie Wood
- Released: 28 September 1992
- Recorded: August–September and December 1991, February 1992
- Studio: Sandymount, St. Kildare, Ireland
- Genre: Rock
- Label: Continuum
- Producer: Ronnie Wood, Bernard Fowler

Ronnie Wood chronology
Live at the Ritz (1988)	Slide on This (1992)	Slide on Live: Plugged in and Standing (1993)

Professional ratings
Review scores
Source	Rating
AllMusic	3/5 stars

Slide on This is the fifth solo album by Ronnie Wood, released in September 1992. The final track, "Breathe on Me", is a remake from a song that originally appeared on Wood's 1975 solo album, Now Look.

According to SoundScan, it sold over 58,000 copies in the United States. In Japan, it charted for four weeks in the top 100, reaching No. 54 and selling 21,000 copies.

== Track listing ==
All tracks composed by Ronnie Wood and Bernard Fowler, except where indicated.

1. "Somebody Else Might"
2. "Testify" (George Clinton, Deron Taylor)
3. "Ain't Rock and Roll"
4. "Josephine"
5. "Knock Yer Teeth Out" (Wood, Fowler, Julian Lloyd)
6. "Ragtime Annie (Lillie's Bordello)" (Trad.)
7. "Must Be Love" (Jerry Williams)
8. "Fear for Your Future"
9. "Show Me" (Williams)
10. "Always Wanted More" [Duet with Joe Elliott]
11. "Thinkin'"
12. "Like It"
13. "Breathe on Me" (Wood)

== Personnel ==
- Ronnie Wood - vocals, guitar, acoustic bass, harmonica
- The Edge - additional guitar
- Doug Wimbish - bass
- Ian McLagan - piano
- Chuck Leavell - piano, Hammond organ B-3
- Bernard Fowler - keyboards, drum programming, vocals
- Sean Garvey - accordion, squeezebox
- Felim Gormley - saxophone
- Sergei Erdenko, Colm McCauchey, Oleg Ponomarev - fiddle on "Ragtime Annie (Lillie's Bordello)" and "Always Wanted More"
- Michael Kamen - string arrangements, production
- Charlie Watts - drums
- Simon Kirke - drums
- Wayne P. Sheehy - drums
- Joe Elliott - vocals on "Always Wanted More"
