= Buried Alive: Live in Maryland =

Live album by The New Barbarians
- Released: 4 September 2006
- Recorded: 5 May 1979
- Genre: Rock
- Label: Wooden Records

Professional ratings
Review scores
Source	Rating
Allmusic	3.5/5 stars

Buried Alive: Live in Maryland is a live album by The New Barbarians. It was recorded at the Capital Centre in Landover, Maryland on May 5, 1979 during the band's only concert tour.

== Track listing ==
=== Disc 1 ===
1. "Sweet Little Rock N Roller" (Chuck Berry) – 4:20
2. "Buried Alive" (Ron Wood) – 6:27
3. "F.U.C. Her" (Ron Wood) – 4:48
4. "Mystifies Me" (Ron Wood) – 5:37
5. "Infekshun" (Ron Wood) – 4:56
6. "Rock Me Baby" (Big Bill Broonzy, Arthur Crudup) – 6:04
7. "Sure the One You Need" (Keith Richards, Ron Wood), (Lead vocal Keith Richards) – 4:49
8. "Lost & Lonely" (Ron Wood) – 4:29
9. "Love in Vain" (Robert Johnson) – 8:38
10. "Breathe on Me" (Ron Wood) – 10:23

=== Disc 2 ===
1. "Let's Go Steady" (Arthur Alexander), (Lead vocal Keith Richards) – 3:25
2. "Apartment No. 9" (Johnny Paycheck, Bobby Austin), (Lead vocal Keith Richards) – 4:13
3. "Honky Tonk Women" (Mick Jagger, Keith Richards) – 5:50
4. "Worried Life Blues" (Major Merryweather), (Lead vocal Keith Richards) – 4:07
5. "I Can Feel the Fire" (Ron Wood) – 6:44
6. "Come to Realise" (Ron Wood) – 5:11
7. "Am I Grooving You?" (Bert Russell, Jeff Barry) – 9:39
8. "Seven Days" (Bob Dylan) – 6:03
9. "Before They Make Me Run" (Jagger, Richards), (Lead vocal Keith Richards) – 3:23
10. "Jumpin' Jack Flash" (Jagger, Richards) – 7:38

== Personnel ==
- Ronnie Wood – guitar, harmonica, pedal steel guitar, lead and backing vocals
- Keith Richards – guitar, piano, backing and lead vocals
- Stanley Clarke – bass guitar
- Zigaboo Modeliste – drums
- Ian McLagan – piano, organ, backing vocals
- Bobby Keys – saxophone
