= Jo Wood =

English model, television personality, and entrepreneur

- Born: Josephine Karslake; 15 March 1955 (age 71); Essex, England
- Occupations: Entrepreneur; model; television personality
- Years active: 1977–present
- Spouses: Peter Greene (m. 1973; div. 1976) Ronnie Wood (m. 1985; div. 2009)
- Website: essentiallyjo.com

Josephine Wood (née Karslake; born 15 March 1955) is an English model, television personality and entrepreneur. She is the former wife of the Rolling Stones guitarist Ronnie Wood. She accompanied him regularly on tour, looking after his diet.

Wood has travelled the world, and has lived in Los Angeles, New York and is now settled in London. When living in New York, Wood designed clothes for the fashion label No Scruples.

== Early life ==
Born Josephine Karslake, Wood was born on 15 March 1955 in Essex to Rachel (née Lundell), who is South African by birth, and Michael Karslake. Her father was an architectural model maker, and her mother was an Avon lady and a doll maker. She is the oldest of four children. She has a sister, Lize, and two brothers, Vinnie and Paul Karslake.

Wood worked as a model until she was 22 and was The Sun's "Face of 1972".

== Family ==
In 1973, Wood eloped with Peter Greene in Las Vegas. They had a son in September 1974. They divorced in 1976.

She met Ronnie Wood in 1977. They married on 2 January 1985. They have two children together. She and Ronnie Wood divorced in 2009.

Wood has ten grandchildren: Four from Jameson (Jamie), two from Leah, and four from Jesse.

== Jo Wood Organics ==
Following a serious illness in 1989, Wood began to follow a strictly organic lifestyle. In 2008 she launched her own range of organic fragrance, bath and body care products, Jo Wood Organics.

== Mrs. Paisley's Lashings ==
In 2009, Wood set up her own pop up restaurant 'Mrs Paisley's Lashings' with Arthur Potts Dawson. The restaurant was set up in Wood's house with her aim to promote sustainable dining and green living.

== Charity ==
In 2009 she worked alongside daughter Leah to promote 18 Degrees of Inspiration for climate change charity Global Cool. In the same year she also joined the 10:10 project, a movement that encourages people to reduce their carbon emissions.

== Television appearances ==
In 2009, she partnered Brendan Cole in the BBC show Strictly Come Dancing. The duo was eliminated in Week 6 of the competition when they received 14/40 for their samba. In July 2013, Wood appeared on Celebrity MasterChef, where she was the second contestant to be eliminated. She has also appeared on Celebrity First Dates and The Island.

== Alien Nation podcast ==
Wood is an avid believer in aliens and UFOs since seeing strange lights in the sky in Brazil in 1998. On her Alien Nation Podcast she talks to other celebrities and members of the public who believe they have had close encounters or simply think there are other planets with life in the universe.

== Writing ==
Wood writes editorial columns in Fabulous & Natural Health magazine and has written a book called How to Look and Feel Healthy, Energetic and Radiant the Organic Way.

In November 2019, Wood released an autobiography, Stoned: Photographs & treasures from life with the Rolling Stones. She published a memoir in February 2013. In 2025, Wood published her debut novel, The Resurrection of Flo.
