= Now Look =

Studio album by Ronnie Wood
- Released: July 1975
- Recorded: 22 April – 6 June 1974 (London); 14–21 April 1975 (Baambrugge)
- Studios: The Wick, Richmond, London; B.B.C. Studios, Baambrugge, Holland
- Genre: Rock
- Label: Warner Bros.
- Producers: Ronnie Wood; Bobby Womack; Ian McLagan

Ronnie Wood chronology
I've Got My Own Album to Do (1974)	Now Look (1975)	Mahoney's Last Stand (1976)

Professional ratings
Review scores
Source	Rating
AllMusic	4/5 stars
Christgau's Record Guide	B
Disc	2/4 stars
MusicHound	2/5 stars
Record Collector	4/5 stars
The Rolling Stone Album Guide	3/5 stars

Now Look is the second solo album by English musician Ronnie Wood, released in July 1975. In the United States, it peaked at number 118 on Billboard's top 200 albums listing, during a six-week chart run. Produced by Wood, Bobby Womack and Ian McLagan, the album also includes musical contributions from Keith Richards, Mick Taylor, Jean Roussel, Willie Weeks and Andy Newmark – all of whom had played on Wood's debut, I've Got My Own Album to Do.

The Faces worked the song "Big Bayou" into the setlist for their 1975 fall tour, which turned out to be the band's final tour. Faces vocalist Rod Stewart recorded his own cover of "Big Bayou" the following year for A Night on the Town. Wood remade "Breathe on Me" in 1991 for his album Slide on This.

== Track listing ==
All tracks composed by Ronnie Wood, except where indicated.

1. "I Got Lost When I Found You" (Wood, Bobby Womack) – 4:26
2. "Big Bayou" (Gib Guilbeau) – 2:42
3. "Breathe on Me" – 6:32
4. "If You Don’t Want My Love" (Womack, Gordon DeWitty) – 4:18
5. "I Can Say She's Alright" (Wood, Womack) – 6:22
6. "Caribbean Boogie" – 2:23
7. "Now Look" – 3:53
8. "Sweet Baby Mine" (Jim Ford, Womack) – 3:28
9. "I Can't Stand the Rain" (Donald Bryant, Ann Peebles, Bernard Miller) – 3:12
10. "It's Unholy" – 6:28
11. "I Got a Feeling" (Womack, Ian McLagan, Jean Roussel) – 3:21

== Personnel ==
- Ronnie Wood – lead vocals, guitars (acoustic, rhythm, lead, slide and pedal steel)
- Keith Richards – guitar on "I Can Say She's Alright" and "I Can't Stand the Rain", harmony vocals on "Breathe on Me"
- Bobby Womack – guitar, backing vocals on "I Got Lost When I Found You", "Big Bayou", "If You Don't Want My Love", "I Can Say She's Alright", "Sweet Baby Mine", and "I Got a Feeling"
- Mick Taylor – slide guitar on "It's Unholy"
- Willie Weeks – bass guitar on all tracks
- Ian McLagan – organ, piano, keyboards, backing vocals on all tracks
- Jean Roussel – synthesizer, keyboards, electric piano, clavinet on "I Got Lost When I Found You", "Big Bayou", "If You Don't Want My Love", "I Can Say She's Alright", "Sweet Baby Mine", "It's Unholy" and "I Got a Feeling"
- Andy Newmark – drums, percussion on all tracks
- Kenney Jones – additional drums on "Caribbean Boogie" and "Now Look"
- Womack Sisters – backing vocals on "I Got a Feeling"

Technical

- Keith Harwood – engineer
- Nigel Molden – coordinator
- AGI, Mike Doud, Ronnie Wood – cover design
- Chevy Kevorkian – front cover photography
