= I've Got My Own Album to Do =

Studio album by Ronnie Wood
- Released: 13 September 1974
- Recorded: 1973–74
- Studio: The Wick, Richmond, London
- Genre: Rock
- Label: Warner Music
- Producer: Ronnie Wood, Gary Kellgren

Ronnie Wood chronology
I've Got My Own Album to Do (1974)	Now Look (1975)

I've Got My Own Album to Do is the first solo album by English rock musician Ronnie Wood (credited at the time as Ron Wood), released in September 1974. An all-star project recorded outside of his activities with the Faces, it reached number 27 on the UK's NME chart. The album title was thought to be a dig at Rod Stewart, who appeared to be more committed to his solo career than working with the Faces. Wood has said that the title originated from contributors such as George Harrison and Mick Jagger "nagging me to let them go home" and finish their own projects. The album was recorded at The Wick, Wood's house in Richmond, south-west London.

During this period, Wood assisted Jagger in writing and recording the Rolling Stones' 1974 single "It's Only Rock 'n Roll", while Jagger reciprocated by helping Wood with his album's opening track, "I Can Feel the Fire". Keith Richards was another participant at the sessions, in addition to performing concerts in London with Wood to promote the release. Wood's collaboration with Harrison, "Far East Man", was re-recorded by Harrison and appeared on the former Beatle's Dark Horse album three months after the release of I've Got My Own Album to Do. Other musicians on the album include Wood's Faces bandmates Stewart and Ian McLagan, Mick Taylor of the Rolling Stones, keyboardist Jean Roussel and the all-American rhythm section of Willie Weeks and Andy Newmark. In addition, Pete Sears played bass and celeste, and Micky Waller (Wood and Stewart's former bandmate in the Jeff Beck Group) played drums on the track "Mystifies Me".

The Faces worked "I Can Feel the Fire" and "Take a Look at the Guy" into their setlists for a 1974 UK tour and two US tours of 1975. "Sure the One You Need" was performed twice by the Rolling Stones during the first leg of their 1975 tour. Wood performed "I Can Feel the Fire", "Far East Man", "Mystifies Me" and "Am I Grooving You" in his solo shows between 1979 and 2012.

Professional ratings
Review scores
Source	Rating
AllMusic	4.5/5 stars
Christgau's Record Guide	C+
MusicHound	2.5/5
Q	4/5 stars
The Rolling Stone Album Guide	3/5 stars

== Track listing ==
All tracks composed by Ronnie Wood except where noted.

Side one

1. "I Can Feel the Fire" – 4:54
2. "Far East Man" (George Harrison, Wood) – 4:40
3. "Mystifies Me" – 3:19
4. "Take a Look at the Guy" – 2:33
5. "Act Together" (Mick Jagger, Keith Richards) – 4:25
6. "Am I Grooving You" (Bert Russell, Jeff Barry) – 3:41

Side two

7. "Shirley" – 5:21
8. "Cancel Everything" – 4:40
9. "Sure the One You Need" (Jagger, Richards) – 4:12
10. "If You Gotta Make a Fool of Somebody" (Rudy Clark) – 3:34
11. "Crotch Music" (Willie Weeks) – 6:04

== Personnel ==
Musician credits per LP's inner sleeve.

- Ron Wood – lead vocals (tracks 1–10), guitars (1–11), percussion (1), harmonica (6), guitar effects (11)
- Keith Richards – guitars (1, 4–6, 8–10), electric piano (5), piano (5), backing vocals (6, 10), percussion (1), lead vocals (5, 9), guitar effects (11)
- George Harrison – slide guitar (2), backing vocals (2)
- Martin Quittenton – acoustic guitar (3)
- Mick Taylor – bass (2, 7), electric guitar (4), electric piano (7), ARP synthesizer (10)
- Willie Weeks – bass (1, 4–6, 8–11), guitar effects (11)
- Pete Sears – bass (3), celeste (3)
- Ian McLagan – organ (1, 3, 5, 10), electric piano (2, 4), ARP synthesizer (6, 7, 11), piano (9)
- Jean Roussel – organ (2), electric piano (8), piano (8)
- Andy Newmark – drums (1, 2, 4–11), percussion (1)
- Micky Waller – drums (3)
- Ross Henderson – steel drums (1)
- Sterling – steel drums (1)
- Mick Jagger – backing vocals (1, 6), guitar (1)
- David Bowie – backing vocals (1)
- Rod Stewart – backing vocals (3, 4, 10)
- Ruby James – backing vocals (5, 8)
- Ireen and Doreen Chanter – backing vocals (5, 8)

== Charts ==
Chart (1974)	Position
Australia (Kent Music Report)	94
