= Andy Newmark =

American session drummer (born 1950)

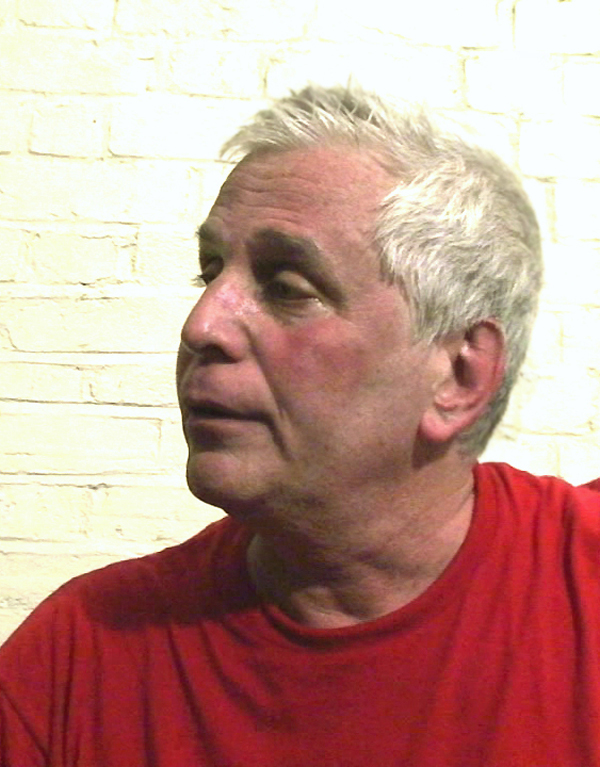
- Newmark at the Three Mariners, Faversham, Kent, England, in 2008

Background information
- Born: July 14, 1950 (age 76); Port Chester, New York, U.S.
- Genres: Pop; rock; soul; funk; R&B
- Occupation: Drummer
- Instruments: Drums; percussion
- Years active: 1967–present
- Website: andynewmark.com

Andrew Newmark (born July 14, 1950) is an American session drummer who was a member of Sly and the Family Stone and has played with George Harrison, John Lennon, Pink Floyd, David Bowie, Carly Simon, Steve Winwood, Ron Wood and Roxy Music. Sly Stone, in his memoir Thank You (Falettinme Be Mice Elf Agin), called Newmark the best drummer he had ever worked with.

== Biography ==
Andrew Newmark was born on July 14, 1950, in Port Chester, New York, and raised primarily in the nearby suburb of Mamaroneck. His mother was Bermudian and his father, Charles W. Newmark, was an Assistant District Attorney from 1938 to 1940 in New York City under District Attorney Thomas E. Dewey. His Father was Russian-Jewish. Taking up the drums at the age of nine, Newmark gradually honed his craft and was taking paid gigs at age 15. Visiting his mother's native Bermuda frequently throughout his youth, Newmark made the decision to move there at the age of 16. Newmark played in the Bermuda Jam, a band that included guitarist Paul Muggleton.

One of his first gigs was recording with Carly Simon on her albums Anticipation and No Secrets. These and other sessions segued into a more permanent role as a member of the funk band Sly and the Family Stone from 1972 to 1973. Hired to replace Gerry Gibson, who had replaced founding member Greg Errico, Newmark was invited to audition for Sly Stone by saxophonist Pat Rizzo. Newmark went on to record one album, Fresh (1973), as the Family Stone's drummer and performed with the band for two years in concert.

After leaving Family Stone in 1974, Newmark played drums for the first month of George Harrison and Ravi Shankar's 1974 North American tour, and returned to session work, playing drums on Gary Wright's 1975 album Dream Weaver. He continued performing on Carly Simon's solo albums throughout the 1970s and again in the 1990s. Newmark has performed and recorded with John Lennon, Cat Stevens, Joe Walsh, B.B. King, Eric Clapton, David Bowie, Roy Buchanan, Bryan Ferry, Dan Fogelberg, George Harrison, Rickie Lee Jones, Patrick Moraz, Randy Newman, Pink Floyd, Roger Waters, David Gilmour, Murray Head, Keith Richards, Rod Stewart, Luther Vandross, Ronnie Wood, Roxy Music, ABC, Hue and Cry, Laura Nyro, Nicolette Larson, Elkie Brooks, Sting, Steve Winwood, Nils Lofgren, George Benson, and Michael Franks.

In 1980, Newmark was the drummer on John Lennon's last album, Double Fantasy, as well as Milk and Honey released in 1984. He was the featured drummer on Yoko Ono's Season of Glass in 1981. His connection with the Double Fantasy album was reprised in 2012 with his contributions to the Lennon Bermuda tribute album on several tracks, including those by Paul Carrack, Bryan Ferry, Nils Lofgren, and Rocky and the Natives.

According to a 2006 Sound on Sound magazine interview with engineer Andy Jackson, Newmark played drums on David Gilmour's On an Island album. Newmark also plays on several tracks on David Gilmour's 2015 solo album Rattle That Lock.

== Equipment ==
Newmark uses Yamaha drums, Remo drum heads, Zildjian cymbals and Vic Firth drumsticks. His drum setup and cymbals vary slightly with who he plays with, but generally favors a setup consisting of a bass drum, rack tom, snare drum, and then one or two floor toms. He plays a mix of Zildjian A and K cymbals.

Drums: Yamaha Recording Custom and Tour Custom Series:

- 16"x24" bass drum
- 8"x12" rack tom
- 16"x16" floor tom

Cymbals: Zildjian:

- 13" A new beat hi-hats or 14" A new beat hi-hats
- 8" A splash
- 16" A rock crash or 17" A thin crash
- 18" A thin crash
- 20" A medium ride or 20" K ride or 20" K Constantinople ride

Drumheads: Remo

- Yamaha variation of Remo drumheads

Drumsticks: Vic Firth:

- Vic Firth 5A drumsticks

== Discography ==
Year	Album	Collaborator(s)	Notes
1971	Anticipation	Carly Simon	
1972	No Secrets	Carly Simon	
1973	Fresh	Sly and the Family Stone	
1973	Kindling	Gene Parsons	
1973	U.F.O.	Ron Davies	
1974	Hotcakes	Carly Simon	
1974	Dark Horse	George Harrison	
1974	Wrap Around Joy	Carole King	
1974	I've Got My Own Album to Do	Ronnie Wood	
1974	Good Old Boys	Randy Newman	
1974	Smiler	Rod Stewart	
1975	Playing Possum	Carly Simon	
1975	Gorilla	James Taylor	
1975	Extra Texture (Read All About It)	George Harrison	
1975	Now Look	Ronnie Wood	
1975	Young Americans	David Bowie	
1975	The Dream Weaver	Gary Wright	
1975	In Concert-Carnegie Hall	George Benson	
1975	Good King Bad	George Benson	
1975	Atlantic Crossing	Rod Stewart	
1975	Michael Bolotin	Michael Bolton	
1976	Another Passenger	Carly Simon	
1976	Black Widow	Lalo Schifrin	
1976	Benson & Farrell	George Benson and Joe Farrell	
1976	Three	Bob James	
1976	End of a Rainbow	Patti Austin	
1976	The Story of I	Patrick Moraz	Side 2
1976	Hank Crawford's Back	Hank Crawford	
1976	The Fox	Urbie Green	
1976	You Can't Argue with a Sick Mind	Joe Walsh	
1976	Mr. Fathead	David "Fathead" Newman	
1976	A Night on the Town	Rod Stewart	
1977	One World	John Martyn	
1977	Little Criminals	Randy Newman	
1977	Izitso	Cat Stevens	
1977	Carole Bayer Sager	Carole Bayer Sager	
1977	Steve Winwood	Steve Winwood	
1978	Jungle Fever	Neil Larsen	
1978	Nested	Laura Nyro	
1978	Shooting Star	Elkie Brooks	
1978	No Frills	Mark Farner	
1979	Airwaves	Badfinger	
1979	George Harrison	George Harrison	
1979	Rickie Lee Jones	Rickie Lee Jones	
1979	In Love	Cheryl Lynn	
1979	Phoenix	Dan Fogelberg	
1979	Born Again	Randy Newman	
1980	Double Fantasy	John Lennon and Yoko Ono	
1980	Red Cab to Manhattan	Stephen Bishop	
1980	Nightbird	Paul Carrack	
1980	Connections	Richie Havens	
1980	Flesh and Blood	Roxy Music	
1981	Voice	Murray Head	
1981	Season of Glass	Yoko Ono	
1982	Gloria Gaynor	Gloria Gaynor	
1982	Anyone Can See	Irene Cara	
1982	Bill LaBounty	Bill LaBounty	
1982	Objects of Desire	Michael Franks	
1982	Avalon	Roxy Music	
1983	Pacific Fire	George Benson	
1983	The High Road	Roxy Music	
1983	Beauty Stab	ABC	
1983	The Final Cut	Pink Floyd	
1984	Milk and Honey	John Lennon and Yoko Ono	
1984	The Pros and Cons of Hitch Hiking	Roger Waters	
1985	Skin Dive	Michael Franks	
1985	Rock a Little	Stevie Nicks	
1985	The Cat Is Out	Judie Tzuke	
1985	Boys and Girls	Bryan Ferry	
1987	...Nothing Like the Sun	Sting	
1987	Exiles	Dan Fogelberg	
1987	Bête Noire	Bryan Ferry	
1992	This is My Life	Carly Simon	
1992	Come On Come On	Mary Chapin Carpenter	
1993	Taxi	Bryan Ferry	
1994	Letters Never Sent	Carly Simon	
1995	Nothing but the Blues	Eric Clapton	
1995	Blue Views	Paul Carrack	
1996	Under the Angels	Judie Tzuke	
1997	Deuces Wild	B.B. King	
1998	Secret Agent	Judie Tzuke	
1999	As Time Goes By	Bryan Ferry	
2000	All the difference	David French	
2001	Not for Beginners	Ronnie Wood	
2001	Satisfy My Soul	Paul Carrack	
2002	Frantic	Bryan Ferry	
2006	On an Island	David Gilmour	
2007	The First Barbarians: Live from Kilburn	Ronnie Wood	Recorded in 1974, released in 2007
2007	Dylanesque	Bryan Ferry	
2010	Olympia	Bryan Ferry	
2014	Avonmore	Bryan Ferry	
2015	Rattle That Lock	David Gilmour	
