= Ronnie Wood =

English rock musician (born 1947)

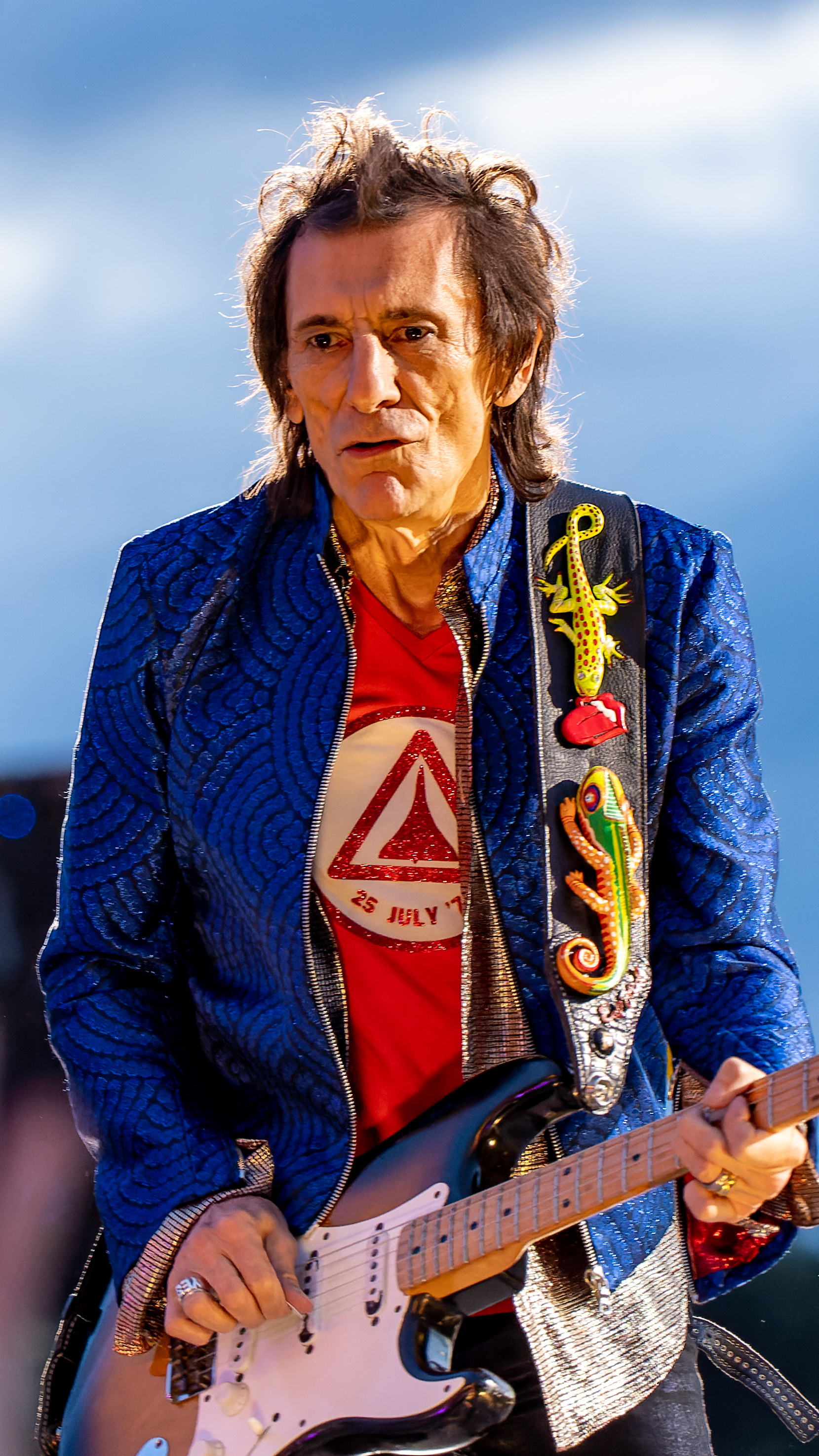
- Wood on stage with the Rolling Stones in 2022

Background information
- Also known as: Ron Wood; Woody
- Born: Ronald David Wood; 1 June 1947 (age 79); London Borough of Hillingdon, England
- Genres: Rock music; blues
- Occupations: Musician; songwriter; record producer; painter; radio personality
- Instruments: Guitar; bass; vocals
- Years active: 1964–present
- Label: Warner Bros.
- Member of: The Rolling Stones; Faces
- Formerly of: The Birds; The Creation; The Jeff Beck Group; The New Barbarians
- Spouses: Krissy Findlay (m. 1971; div. 1978) Jo Karslake (m. 1985; div. 2009) Sally Humphreys (m. 2012)
- Website: ronniewood.com

Ronald David Wood (born 1 June 1947) is an English rock musician, most notable as a member of the Rolling Stones since 1975, and a member of Faces and the Jeff Beck Group.

Wood began his career in 1964, playing lead guitar with several British rhythm and blues bands in short succession, including the Birds and the Creation. He joined the Jeff Beck Group in 1967 as a guitarist and bassist, playing on the albums Truth and Beck-Ola. The group split in 1969, and Wood departed along with lead vocalist Rod Stewart to join former Small Faces members Ronnie Lane, Ian McLagan and Kenney Jones in a new group named Faces, with Wood now primarily on lead guitar. The group found great success in the UK and mainland Europe from the early days on, but only reached major fame in the US during their last year of existence, 1975, with a major tour of the US. Wood sang and co-wrote the title track from their final LP, Ooh La La, released in 1973. He also worked extensively on Stewart's first few solo albums.

As Faces began to split, he started several solo projects, eventually recording his first solo LP, I've Got My Own Album to Do, in 1974. The album featured bandmate McLagan as well as former Beatle George Harrison and Keith Richards of the Rolling Stones, a longtime friend of Wood. Soon after Mick Taylor left the Rolling Stones, Richards invited Wood to join them; he did so in 1975, initially temporarily, but became an official member in 1976.

Besides I've Got My Own Album to Do, Wood has recorded several other solo efforts. Now Look was released in 1975 and peaked at No. 118 on Billboard; he also collaborated with Ronnie Lane for the soundtrack album Mahoney's Last Stand. Wood also released Gimme Some Neck in 1979, which hit No. 45 in the US; 1234 was released in 1981, peaking at No. 164. He released Slide on This in 1992, Not for Beginners in 2002, and I Feel Like Playing in 2010. As a member of the Rolling Stones, Wood was inducted into the Rock and Roll Hall of Fame in 1989 and was inducted a second time, as a member of Faces, in 2012.

== Early life ==
Wood was born in the London Borough of Hillingdon, into a family of English "bargees" (river or canal barge operators, sometimes called "water gypsies"). He has said that his generation was the first in the family to be born on land. He grew up at 8 Whitehorn Avenue, Yiewsley, and attended St Stephen's Infant School, St Matthew's Church of England Primary School and St Martin's C of E Secondary Modern School West Drayton where one of his drawings was chosen for BBC Sketch Club.

Wood's elder brothers, Art and Ted, were graphic artists as well as musicians; all three brothers studied at Ealing College of Art. Ted Wood died in 2004 and Art Wood in 2006.

== Music career ==
=== 1960s ===
Wood began his career as a professional musician in 1964 as a lead guitarist with the Birds, a R&B band based in Yiewsley, Middlesex. A popular live act with a considerable fan base, the Birds released several singles in the mid-1960s; Wood wrote or co-wrote nearly half the songs the group recorded.

By 1967, the Birds had disbanded, and Wood briefly took part in a project called Santa Barbara Machine Head which included later Deep Purple co-founder Jon Lord, before joining the Jeff Beck Group initially as a rhythm guitarist, switching roles to bassist later that year following the departures of both original bassist Jet Harris and his replacement Jeff Ambrose. Along with vocalist Rod Stewart, Wood embarked on several tours with Beck and recorded two albums: Truth in 1968 and Beck-Ola in 1969. In between Jeff Beck Group projects, Wood also worked with the Creation.

In Wood's radio show on 14 November 2011, both Wood and Alice Cooper claimed that Wood performed the bass on the Crazy World of Arthur Brown's number one hit "Fire"; Polly Marshall's biography of Arthur Brown states that "according to the-faces.com, Ronnie claims he played on the Track Records studio sessions recording Fire, but he must have confused it with the BBC session [of 8 April 1968]." There is no bass guitar on the recording, only bass pedals.

In 1969, after Steve Marriott left the Small Faces, Wood began working with the remaining members of that group, returning to his instrument of choice, the guitar. This line-up, plus Rod Stewart and former Bird Kim Gardner, teamed up with Wood's brother Art Wood in a formation called Quiet Melon, making a handful of recordings in May 1969. After the Jeff Beck Group's fifth US tour in July, Wood and Stewart joined the former Small Faces full-time, and the band's name was changed to Faces. During the summer of 1969, Stewart and Wood also set the template for what would become Faces on An Old Raincoat Won't Ever Let You Down, Stewart's first solo album (known as The Rod Stewart Album in the US). The backing band on the album also included Ian McLagan, Keith Emerson, Micky Waller, and guitarists Martin Pugh (of Steamhammer and later Armageddon and 7th Order) and Martin Quittenton (also from Steamhammer).

=== 1970s ===
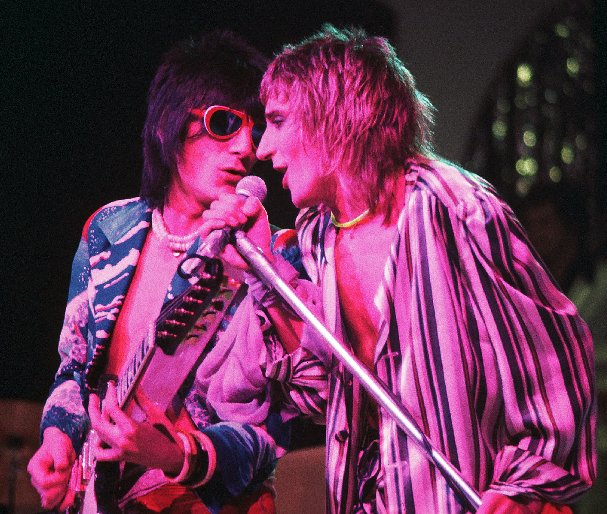
Wood (left) while in Faces, with Rod Stewart (right) in 1975

In the first half of the 1970s, Faces released four studio albums and were among the top-grossing live acts of the period. Besides his distinctive guitar work, Wood contributed harmonica, vocals, and bass to the band's recordings, and co-wrote many of their songs, including "Stay With Me" and "Ooh La La". He also played on bandmate Stewart's first few solo albums and is co-writer of the Rod Stewart songs "Gasoline Alley" and "Every Picture Tells a Story", as well as several songs on Never a Dull Moment.

In 1972, Wood and Faces bassist Ronnie Lane composed the soundtrack to the film Mahoney's Last Stand; the soundtrack, which was released as an LP in 1976, also features Faces bandmates Ian McLagan and Kenney Jones, along with contributions from Pete Townshend and Ric Grech. Wood also performed with Townshend, Grech, Steve Winwood, Jim Capaldi and Eric Clapton at Clapton's Rainbow Concert in 1973.

In 1973, Wood asked his old friend Mick Taylor, whom he had known since the early 1960s, to help with his first solo album. In December 1973, Wood collaborated with Mick Jagger on the song "It's Only Rock'n Roll (But I Like It)". Eventually, Jagger and Keith Richards also contributed to Wood's solo LP. I've Got My Own Album to Do was released in 1974, having been recorded at Wood's private studio in the basement of The Wick, his home near London.

Following Taylor's departure from the Rolling Stones in December 1974, Wood participated in the band's March 1975 recording sessions for their forthcoming album Black and Blue. Although still a member of Faces, he toured North America with the Rolling Stones in 1975; Faces announced their break-up in December of that year, and Wood was officially declared a member of the Rolling Stones on 23 April 1976.

In the Rolling Stones, Wood plays the slide guitar as Taylor and Brian Jones had done before him, and added lap steel and pedal steel guitar to the band. Wood's guitar interplay with Richards often blurs the boundaries between lead and rhythm roles, a practice borrowed from Chicago Blues which Richards dubbed "the ancient art of weaving." Wood also occasionally plays bass guitar, as seen during 1975 concert performances of "Fingerprint File", when Mick Jagger played rhythm guitar and bassist Bill Wyman moved to synthesiser. The Rolling Stones' single "Emotional Rescue" also features Wood on bass. He has been given credit as a co-writer for over a dozen songs, including "Dance", "Black Limousine", "One Hit (to the Body)", and "Had It With You".

In 1975, Wood released his second solo album, Now Look; his third, Gimme Some Neck, came out in 1979. To promote it, Wood formed and toured with the New Barbarians, playing 20 concerts in Canada and the US in April/May and the Knebworth Festival in the UK in August.

=== 1980s ===
Throughout the 1980s, Wood played as an official member of the Rolling Stones; continued his solo career, releasing the album 1234 in 1981; painted; and collaborated with a number of other artists, including Prince, Bob Dylan, David Bowie, Eric Clapton, Bo Diddley, Ringo Starr and Aretha Franklin.

At the 1985 Live Aid Concert in Philadelphia, Wood along with Keith Richards performed in the penultimate set with Bob Dylan. During the performance of "Blowin' in the Wind", one of Dylan's guitar strings broke. Wood gave Dylan his guitar to keep the performance seamless and played air guitar until a stagehand brought him a replacement.

=== 1990s–2010s ===
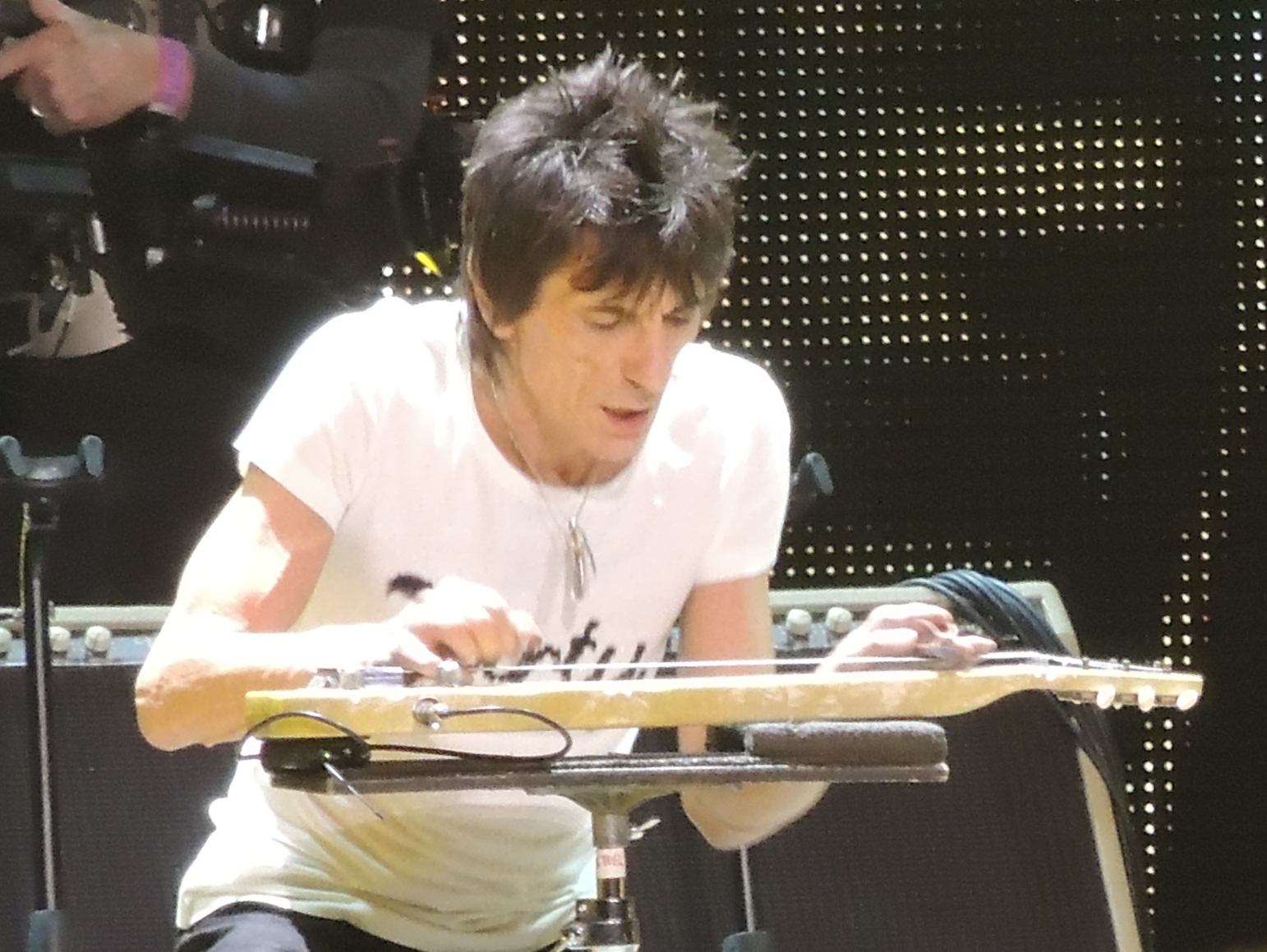
Wood during the Rolling Stones 50 & Counting tour in December 2012

Wood was made a fully-fledged partner in the Rolling Stones' financial organisation in 1990. During the 1990s, the Rolling Stones released two studio albums and three concert albums, as well as touring in 1990, 1994–95, and 1997–99.

In addition, Wood released his seventh solo album, Slide on This, in 1992; he toured to promote this album in North America and Japan. His appearance in 1993 with former bandmate Rod Stewart on MTV Unplugged resulted in a hit album titled Unplugged...and Seated; the concert album that Wood released in 1993 from his tour was called Slide on Live: Plugged in and Standing.

Wood also contributed to Bo Diddley's 1996 album A Man Amongst Men, playing slide guitar on the tracks "Hey Baby", "A Man Amongst Men", and "Oops! Bo Diddley", and guitar on "I Can't Stand It".

Since 2000, Wood has continued to combine solo work with his Rolling Stones schedule. After the 2001 release of his album Not For Beginners, Wood toured England and Ireland in 2001 and 2002 with his own group, The Ronnie Wood Band. The band included members of his family, Slash, Andrea Corr, Jesse Wood, Martin Wright, Tramper Price, Mark Wells, Leah Wood, and Frankie Gavin. After the tour, a DVD called Far East Man was released, a song co-written by Ronnie Wood and George Harrison.

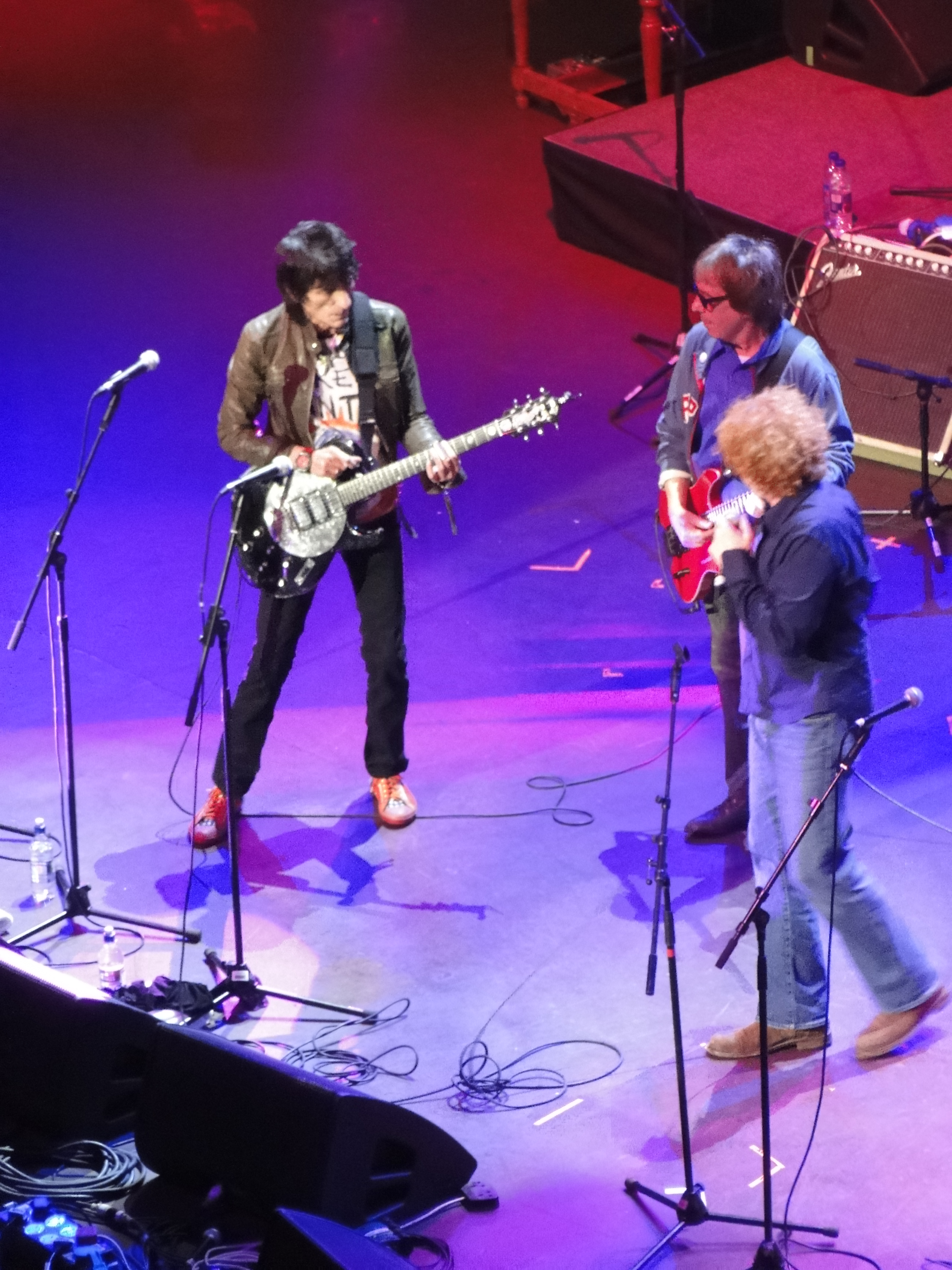
Ronnie Wood, Bill Wyman and Mick Hucknall at Faces reunion performance, 25 October 2009

Wood toured with the Rolling Stones in 2002 and 2003; in 2004, he performed several one-off concerts and guest appearances, including several appearances with Rod Stewart. Later in the year, the two expressed intentions to finish the studio work on a collaborative album, to be titled You Strum and I'll Sing. In 2005, however, Wood was again busy with the Rolling Stones as the band recorded their A Bigger Bang album—although he played on only 10 of the album's 16 tracks. He took part in the accompanying tour, which lasted until August 2007.

In 2005, Wood launched his own record company, Wooden Records, which has released recordings by his daughter Leah, the New Barbarians, and others.

In November 2006, during a break in the Rolling Stones' A Bigger Bang Tour, Wood played guitar on three tracks for British soul artist Beverley Knight's album Music City Soul, released in 2007.

On 9 May 2009, Wood, along with Red Hot Chili Peppers members Anthony Kiedis, Michael "Flea" Balzary, Chad Smith and musician Ivan Neville performed under the name "the Insects" at the fifth annual MusiCares event honouring Kiedis.

On 11 August 2009, Wood joined Pearl Jam on the stage of Shepherd's Bush Empire in London for a performance of "All Along the Watchtower".

On 25 October 2009, Wood, Ian McLagan, and Kenney Jones joined forces for a Faces performance at London's Royal Albert Hall on behalf of the Performing Rights Society's Music Members' Benevolent Fund. Bill Wyman played bass; lead vocals were shared by several performers, notably Mick Hucknall. Rod Stewart, who had earlier denied rumours of plans for a Faces reunion in 2009, was not present. On 2 November 2009, Wood was given an "Outstanding Contribution" award at the Classic Rock Roll of Honour ceremony in London. Pete Townshend presented the award.

Since 9 April 2010, Wood has presented his own radio show on Absolute Radio. Airing on Saturday night at 10 pm, the one-hour show consists of Wood playing tracks by artists he has worked with and other personal favourites. In May 2011 Wood won the Sony Radio Personality of the Year award for The Ronnie Wood Show.

In May 2023, Wood performed at the Jeff Beck tribute concerts held at the Royal Albert Hall, sharing the stage with Rod Stewart, Eric Clapton, Kirk Hammett, and Johnny Depp among others and two months later, he made a surprise appearance during the Hollywood Vampires concert at O2 Arena in London. In 2024, he contributed guitar to a re-release of Mark Knopfler's "Going Home: Theme of the Local Hero" in aid of the Teenage Cancer Trust.

In 2025, Wood worked with Stewart on a new documentary about the Faces, and a new Faces album.

== Other ventures ==
=== Artwork ===
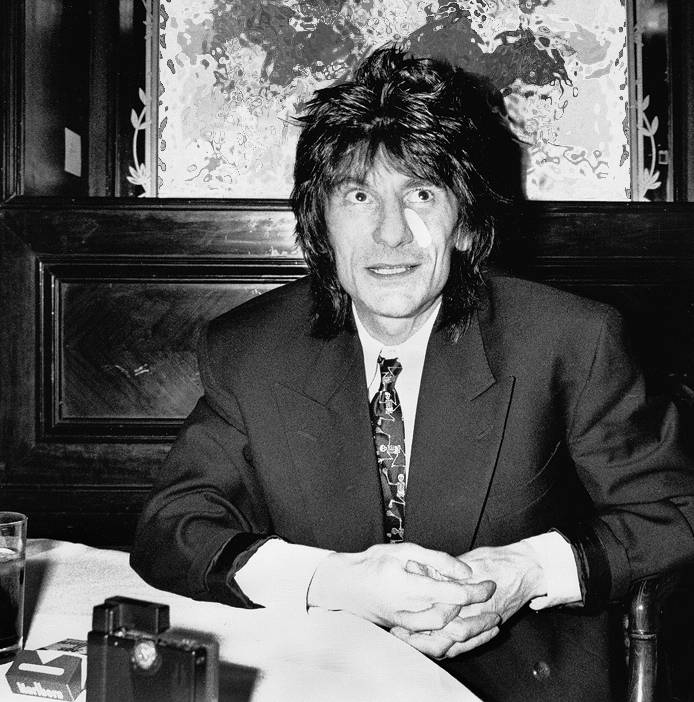
Wood at his art exhibition in Hotel Kramer Malmö 1988.

Wood is a well-known visual artist. When he was a child his drawings were featured on the BBC television programme Sketch Club; he won one of that programme's competitions, an achievement he refers to as his "awakening to art". He went on to train at the Ealing Art College, as had both his brothers. Other notable musicians such as Freddie Mercury of Queen and Pete Townshend of the Who also attended that college in the 1960s.

Wood's paintings, drawings and prints frequently feature icons of popular culture and have been exhibited all over the world. He did the cover artwork to Eric Clapton's 1988 box set Crossroads. Several of his paintings, including a work commissioned by Andrew Lloyd Webber, are displayed at London's Drury Lane Theatre. Art critic Brian Sewell has called Wood "an accomplished and respectable artist"; and the South Bank Show has devoted an entire programme to his artwork. Wood has maintained a long-standing relationship with the San Francisco Art Exchange, which first exhibited his work in 1987. Wood is also co-owner (along with sons Jamie and Tyrone) of a London art gallery called Scream.

=== Books, films and television appearances ===
To date, Wood has three books to his credit: a short collection of autobiographical anecdotes titled The Works, illustrated with Wood's artwork, co-authored by Bill German and published in 1988; a limited-edition art book titled Wood on Canvas: Every Picture Tells a Story, published in 1998 by Genesis Publications; and his 2007 autobiography Ronnie, written in collaboration with his son-in-law Jack MacDonald and Jeffrey Robinson.

In addition to numerous Faces and Rolling Stones concert films, broadcasts and documentaries, Wood performed "I Shall Be Released" alongside the Band, Bob Dylan, and many others in the finale of the documentary The Last Waltz, filmed in 1976. He has made cameo appearances in feature films, including The Deadly Bees (1967), The Wild Life (1984) and 9½ Weeks (1986), as well as on television programs including The Rutles: All You Need Is Cash (1978). In October 2007, Wood appeared on the television motor show Top Gear, achieving a celebrity lap time of 1:49.4.

On 17 October 2017, his autobiography Ronnie Wood: Artist was published.

As a friend of Ronnie O'Sullivan, the snooker player, Wood starred in the eponymous documentary film Ronnie O'Sullivan: The Edge of Everything (2023).

=== Thoroughbred racing ===
Wood has a long-standing interest in thoroughbred breeding and racing. One of his best-known horses, of which he is the breeder, is Sandymount Duke, who has competed in both flat and jump racing under trainer Jessica Harrington. In January 2019, it was announced that Sandymount Duke was being aimed at the Grand National at Aintree racecourse. However, a setback in training prevented the horse from taking its place in the field.

== Personal life ==
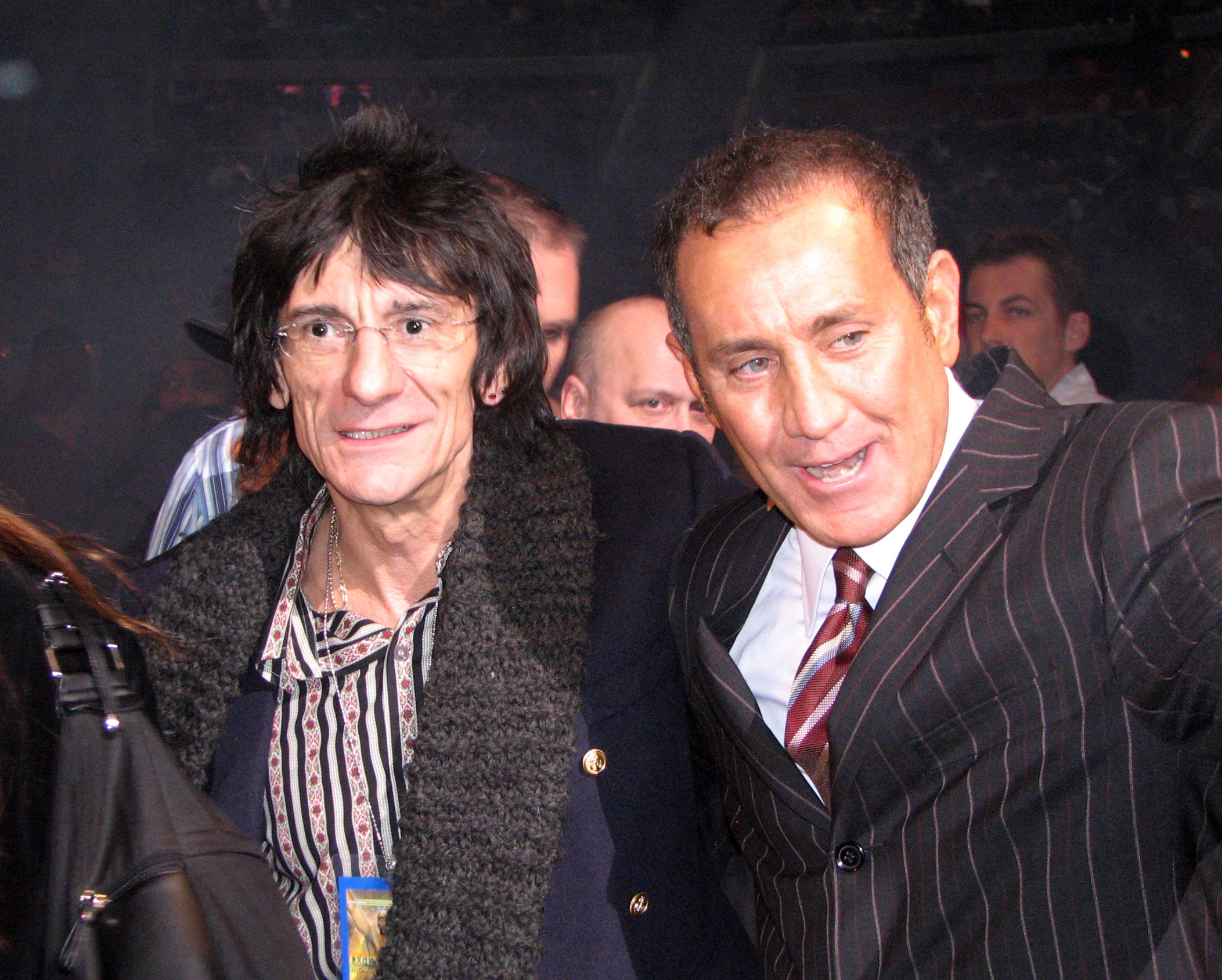
Wood with promoter Joseph Donofrio, 2006

Wood has six children. Jesse is his son with his first wife, Krissy (née Findlay), a former model to whom he was married from 1971 to 1978. During this time, he had an affair with Pattie Boyd, who had been married to George Harrison. Findlay died in 2005. In 1985 Wood married his second wife, Jo Wood (née Karslake), mother of his daughter Leah and son Tyrone. He also adopted Jamie, Jo Wood's son from a previous relationship. In addition to his six children, Wood has six grandchildren.

Wood has been frank about his struggle with alcoholism; although reports between 2003 and 2006 had indicated that he had been sober since the Rolling Stones' 2002–03 tour, in June 2006 it was reported that he was entering rehab following a spell of increased alcohol abuse. Jagger was supportive of his sobriety efforts, though Richards was initially sceptical. By July 2008, ITN reported that Wood had checked himself into rehab a total of six times, the last time being before the wedding of his daughter, Leah. He had plans once again for a seventh admission. Wood also took up stamp collecting as part of his alcoholism rehab.

In July 2008, he left his wife for Katia Ivanova, whom he had met in a London club. Wood checked into rehab again on 16 July 2008. Jo Wood filed for divorce, which was granted in 2009, though they remained friends. On 3 December 2009, Wood was arrested over assault "in connection with a domestic incident". He was cautioned for this offence on 22 December 2009.

On 21 December 2012, Wood married Sally Humphreys, the owner of a theatre production company, 31 years his junior. Their twin girls, named Gracie Jane and Alice Rose, were born on 30 May 2016.

Wood was diagnosed with lung cancer in 2017, necessitating the partial removal of one of his lungs. He said he refused chemotherapy because he did not want to lose his hair. Wood was diagnosed with an aggressive small-cell cancer in 2020 and, following treatment at Royal Marsden Hospital in west London, subsequently announced the diagnosis and the "all-clear" by his doctors in April 2021.

Amid the COVID-19 lockdowns in 2020, Wood shared a message on social media aimed at encouraging others unable to attend Alcoholics Anonymous meetings to stay sober. In 2025, he stated he had been "clean and serene" for 15 years, and smoke-free for 9 years.

On 12 October 2025, Wood was a guest on BBC Radio 4 Desert Island Discs and chose as his luxury items artists' materials and his harmonica. He also recalled his sadness at losing his childhood sweetheart, Stephanie de Court, in a car accident on the eve of his seventeenth birthday in 1964. In his 2007 autobiography Ronnie, he wrote that her death, alongside her two friends, contributed to his subsequent alcohol addiction as his way of dealing with the grief.

He is a fan of English EFL Championship football club West Bromwich Albion.

== Discography ==
=== Studio albums ===
- I've Got My Own Album to Do (1974/Warner Bros.)
- Now Look (1975/Warner Bros.) US No. 118
- Gimme Some Neck (1979/Columbia) US No. 45
- 1234 (1981/Columbia) US No. 164
- Slide on This (1992/Continuum)
- Not for Beginners (2001/SPV)
- I Feel Like Playing (2010/Eagle) UK No. 164

=== Original soundtrack album ===
- Mahoney's Last Stand (1976/Warner Bros.) with Ronnie Lane

=== Live albums ===
- Live at the Ritz (1988/Victor) with Bo Diddley
- Slide on Live: Plugged in and Standing (1993/Continuum)
- Live & Eclectic (2000/SPV) (reissued in 2002 as Live at Electric Ladyland)
- Buried Alive: Live in Maryland (2006/Wooden) with the New Barbarians
- The First Barbarians: Live from Kilburn (2007/Wooden)
- Live in London: I Feel Like Playing (2011/SHProds)
- Mad Lad: A Live Tribute to Chuck Berry (2019/BMG)
- Mr. Luck – A Tribute to Jimmy Reed: Live at the Royal Albert Hall (2021/BMG)

=== Compilation ===
- Always Wanted More (2001/SPV)
- Ronnie Wood Anthology: The Essential Crossexion (2006/Virgin)
- Fearless: The Anthology 1965-2025 (2025/BGM)

=== Singles ===
- "Blue Christmas" with Andrea Corr

=== Other appearances ===
- "It's Not Easy" with Charlie Sexton for The Wild Life (1984)
- "Silver & Gold" with Bono and Keith Richards for Sun City (1985)
- "Chain of Fools" for Back to the Streets: Celebrating the Music of Don Covay (1993)

=== With the Jeff Beck Group ===
- Truth (1968)
- Beck-Ola (1969)

=== With Faces ===
==== Studio albums ====
- First Step (1970)
- Long Player (1971)
- A Nod Is As Good As a Wink... to a Blind Horse (1971)
- Ooh La La (1973)

==== Live albums ====
- Coast to Coast: Overture and Beginners (1974)

=== With the Rolling Stones ===
==== Studio albums ====
- Black and Blue - The Rolling Stones (1976/Atlantic)
- Some Girls (1978/Atlantic)
- Emotional Rescue (1980/Atlantic)
- Tattoo You (1981/Atlantic)
- Undercover (1983/Atlantic)
- Dirty Work (1986/Columbia)
- Steel Wheels (1989/Columbia)
- Voodoo Lounge (1994/Virgin)
- Bridges to Babylon (1997/Virgin)
- A Bigger Bang (2005/Virgin)
- Blue & Lonesome (2016/Polydor)
- Hackney Diamonds (2023/Polydor)
- Foreign Tongues (2026/Polydor)

==== Live albums ====
- Love You Live (1977/Atlantic)
- Still Life (1982/Atlantic)
- Flashpoint (1991/Virgin)
- Stripped (1995/Virgin)
- No Security (1998/Virgin)
- Live Licks (2004/Virgin)
- Shine a Light (2008/Polydor)

=== As session musician ===
- An Old Raincoat Won't Ever Let You Down – Rod Stewart (1969)
- Barabajagal – Donovan (1969)
- Gasoline Alley – Rod Stewart (1970)
- Every Picture Tells a Story – Rod Stewart (1971)
- The Academy in Peril – John Cale (1972)
- Never a Dull Moment – Rod Stewart (1972)
- Dark Horse – George Harrison (1974)
- Smiler – Rod Stewart (1974)
- It's Only Rock 'n Roll – The Rolling Stones (1974)
- Shot of Love – Bob Dylan (1981)
- Stop and Smell the Roses – Ringo Starr (1981)
- Aretha – Aretha Franklin (1986)
- Knocked Out Loaded – Bob Dylan (1986)
- Desire – Toyah (1987)
- Down in the Groove – Bob Dylan (1988)
- Izzy Stradlin and the Ju Ju Hounds – Izzy Stradlin (1992)
- Thanks – Ivan Neville (1995)
- Deuces Wild – B.B. King (1997)
- Music City Soul – Beverley Knight (2007)
- 11 Past the Hour – Imelda May (2021)
