= Have I Told You Lately =

1989 single by Van Morrison

Single by Van Morrison

from the album Avalon Sunset
- B-side: "Contacting My Angel"
- Released: 5 June 1989
- Recorded: Late 1988
- Genre: Celtic; folk rock; soft rock
- Length: 4:20
- Label: Mercury
- Songwriter: Van Morrison
- Producer: Van Morrison

Van Morrison singles chronology
"I'll Tell Me Ma" (1988)	"Have I Told You Lately" (1989)	"Whenever God Shines His Light" (1989)

Avalon Sunset track listing
- 10 tracks: 1. "Whenever God Shines His Light"; 2. "Contacting My Angel"; 3. "I'd Love to Write Another Song"; 4. "Have I Told You Lately"; 5. "Coney Island"; 6. "I'm Tired Joey Boy"; 7. "When Will I Ever Learn to Live in God"; 8. "Orangefield"; 9. "Daring Night"; 10. "These Are the Days"

"Have I Told You Lately" is a song written and recorded by Northern Irish singer and songwriter Van Morrison for his nineteenth studio album, Avalon Sunset (1989). It is a romantic ballad that is often played at weddings, although it was originally written as a prayer. The opening line is from the song "I Forgot to Be Your Lover" by William Bell.

It was released as the album's lead single on 5 June 1989 by Mercury, and reached number 12 on the US Billboard Adult Contemporary chart. It has become a popular cover song with many vocal and instrumental versions recorded by numerous artists and bands. In 1993, Rod Stewart's version charted at number five on both the US Billboard Hot 100 as well as on the UK Singles Chart. In 2021, the song peaked at No. 1 in Ireland on the radio airplay chart.

"Have I Told You Lately" has received acclaim, winning a Grammy Award for Best Pop Collaboration with Vocals and a BMI Million-Air certificate.

== Composition ==
Composed as a love ballad and built on the framework of his earlier song "Someone Like You", it is preceded on Avalon Sunset by the song, "I'd Love to Write Another Song" proclaiming "In poetry I'd carve it well/ I'd even make it rhyme." Then, in the words of Brian Hinton what follows is:

One of the finest love songs of the century, which I remember devastated me when I first heard it, as it seemed both something never quite said before, and yet a song I felt I had known forever. Earthly love transmutes into that for God, just like in Dante, 'there's a love that's divine and it's yours and it's mine.' The morning sun has set by the end of the song, suggesting love shading into death, but subtly.

== Reception ==
"Have I Told You Lately" was listed as number 261 on the "All Time 885 Greatest Songs" list compiled in 2004 by Philadelphia radio station WXPN from listeners' votes. Van Morrison's original recording was also voted number six on a list of the "Top 10 First Dance Wedding Songs", based on a poll of 1,300 DJs in the UK, and was ranked number 98 on the New York Daily News list of The 100 Greatest Love Songs, published on 12 February 2007.

In October 2007, Van Morrison received a Million-Air certificate for over four million air plays of "Have I Told You Lately" from the prestigious BMI awards ceremony held in London, England.

The Record Mirror said, "Van the Man must have been talking to Stevie Wonder recently, because he seems to have caught some of his infectious sentimentality. Either that, or he bumped into Richard Clayderman in the corridor at his record company. There's a really slushy bit of piano in this that my mum would love." Cash Box called it "gorgeous" and an "instant classic."

== Charts ==
=== Weekly charts ===
Original version

Chart (1989)	Peak position
Australia (ARIA)	93
Ireland (IRMA)	12
Italy Airplay (Music & Media)	9
UK Singles (OCC)	74
US Adult Contemporary (Billboard)	12

With the Chieftains

Chart (1995)	Peak position
UK Singles (OCC)	71

== Certifications ==
Region	Certification	Certified units/sales
New Zealand (RMNZ)	Platinum	30,000^{‡}
United Kingdom (BPI)	Silver	200,000^{‡}
^{‡} Sales+streaming figures based on certification alone.

== Other releases ==
Morrison chose "Have I Told You Lately" as one of the songs included on 1990s The Best of Van Morrison, his first greatest-hits album. It was also one of the songs on two of the compilation albums that were issued in 2007: Still on Top - The Greatest Hits contains a remastered version of this song and it was also featured on the compilation album, Van Morrison at the Movies - Soundtrack Hits. A live performance version was included on his 1994 album, A Night in San Francisco. In 1995 Morrison accompanied The Chieftains on a recording of the song for their album The Long Black Veil; this version was awarded the 1996 Grammy Award for Best Pop Collaboration with Vocals. A jazz arrangement is featured on the 2018 album Morrison recorded with organist Joey DeFrancesco entitled You're Driving Me Crazy.

Filmed performances of the song include a version recorded in 1989 that was featured on Morrison's video album Van Morrison: The Concert the following year. In 1995 Morrison performed the song in a duet with Sinéad O'Connor on Late Show with David Letterman; this version was subsequently released on the Live on Letterman: Music from the Late Show CD.

== Rod Stewart versions ==
"Have I Told You Lately (Live)"

Single by Rod Stewart

from the album Unplugged...and Seated
- B-side: "Gasoline Alley" (live)
- Released: 13 April 1993
- Recorded: 5 February 1993
- Venue: Universal (Los Angeles)
- Length: 4:08
- Label: Warner Bros.
- Songwriter: Van Morrison
- Producer: Patrick Leonard

Rod Stewart singles chronology
"Shotgun Wedding" (1993)	"Have I Told You Lately (Live)" (1993)	"Reason to Believe (Live)" (1993)

British singer-songwriter Rod Stewart covered the song for his 16th album, Vagabond Heart (1991). A live version from his album Unplugged...and Seated (1993) was released as a single, becoming a number-five hit in the US and the UK. This version also reached number four on the US Billboard Top 40/Mainstream chart and spent five weeks at number one on the US Billboard Adult Contemporary chart. It was certified gold by the Recording Industry Association of America (RIAA) and sold 700,000 copies in the US. Another live version by Stewart from his 2013 performance at The Troubadour, West Hollywood was included on the deluxe edition of his album Time.

=== Charts ===
==== Weekly charts ====
Original version

Chart (1993)	Peak position
US Adult Contemporary (Billboard)	33

Live version

Chart (1993)	Peak position
Australia (ARIA)	12
Belgium (Ultratop 50 Flanders)	41
Canada Retail Singles (The Record)	3
Canada Top Singles (RPM)	1
Canada Adult Contemporary (RPM)	1
Europe (Eurochart Hot 100)	21
Europe (European Hit Radio)	10
Germany (GfK)	59
Ireland (IRMA)	13
New Zealand (Recorded Music NZ)	41
Panama (UPI)	5
Sweden (Sverigetopplistan)	39
UK Singles (Official Charts)	5
UK Airplay (Music Week)	12
US Billboard Hot 100	5
US Adult Contemporary (Billboard)	1
US Pop Airplay (Billboard)	4
US Cash Box Top 100	2
Zimbabwe (ZIMA)	9

==== Year-end charts ====
Chart (1993)	Rank
Australia (ARIA)	70
Canada Top Singles (RPM)	9
Canada Adult Contemporary (RPM)	14
Iceland (Íslenski Listinn Topp 40)	98
UK Singles (OCC)	61
US Billboard Hot 100	32
US Adult Contemporary (Billboard)	5
US Cash Box Top 100	22

=== Certifications ===
Region	Certification	Certified units/sales
New Zealand (RMNZ)	Gold	15,000^{‡}
United Kingdom (BPI)	Silver	200,000^{‡}
United States (RIAA)	Gold	700,000
^{‡} Sales+streaming figures based on certification alone.

=== Release history ===
Region	Date	Format(s)	Label(s)	Ref.
United States	13 April 1993	7-inch vinyl; CD; cassette	Warner Bros.	
Japan	25 May 1993	Mini-CD	Warner Bros.	
Australia	14 June 1993	CD; cassette	Warner Bros.	
United Kingdom	14 June 1993	7-inch vinyl; CD; cassette	Warner Bros.	

== "Heb Ik Ooit Gezegd" ==
"Heb Ik Ooit Gezegd (Have I Told You Lately)"

Single by Clouseau

from the album In Stereo
- Language: Dutch
- English title: Have I Told You Lately
- B-side: "Heb ik ooit gezegd" (instrumental)
- Released: 29 January 1999
- Studio: Synsound, Brussels
- Genre: Pop; soft rock
- Length: 4:15
- Label: EMI
- Songwriters: Van Morrison; Koen Wauters; Yurek Onzia
- Producers: Kris Wauters; Jean Blaute

Music video
- "Heb Ik Ooit Gezegd" on YouTube

"Heb ik ooit gezegd" ("Have I ever said") is a Dutch-language version recorded by Belgian pop band Clouseau from their eleventh studio album, In Stereo (1999). The song was produced by Kris Wauters and Jean Blaute. It was released as the album's lead single on 29 January 1999, and remained on the Belgium (Flanders) Ultratop 50 chart for sixteen weeks, peaking at number seven for two weeks. It also spent eight weeks on the Netherlands GfK Dutch Chart, peaking at number 68.

=== Background ===
Clouseau is best known for their ballads; but although lead singer Koen Wauters was eager to release more lively, upbeat songs, their cover of Van Morrison's romantic ballad "Have I Told You Lately" was chosen as the album's lead single. The Dutch translation of Morrison's English lyrics was written by Koen Wauters and Yurek Onzia, and the song was produced by Kris Wauters and Jean Blaute.

The song was recorded at Synsound Studio in Brussels, Belgium.

=== Track listing ===
- CD single EMI 8866632 (be) / EAN 0724388666329
1. "Heb ik ooit gezegd" – 4:15
2. "Heb ik ooit gezegd" (instrumental) – 4:14

=== Personnel ===
Personnel list adapted from The Music Archive

- Koen Wauters – vocals
- Kris Wauters – keyboards
- Jean Blaute – guitar, Hammond organ, piano
- Eric Melaerts – guitar
- Evert Verhees – bass guitar
- Walter Mets – drums

=== Chart performance ===
"Heb ik ooit gezegd" entered the Belgium (Flanders) Ultratop 50 chart on 6 February 1999 at number 27. Two weeks later on 20 February 1999, it peaked at number seven, where it remained for two weeks. It briefly dropped out of the top ten but returned to number eight on 20 March 1999 and held that position for two weeks. The song finally exited on 22 May 1999, having spent a total of sixteen weeks on the chart, five of which were in the top ten.

In the Netherlands, "Heb ik ooit gezegd" entered the Dutch charts at number 88 on 1 May 1999, peaking three weeks later at number 72 on 22 May 1999. The song dropped out at number 90 on 19 June 1999, after a total of eight weeks on the chart.

=== Charts ===
Chart (1999)	Peak position
Belgium (Ultratop 50 Flanders)	7
Netherlands (Single Top 100)	68

=== Certifications ===
"Heb ik ooit gezegd" was certified gold on 19 March 1999 for sales in excess of 10,000 units.

=== Other releases ===
Clouseau included "Heb ik ooit gezegd" on several of their subsequent album releases:

- Ballades (2001)
- Clouseau20 (2003)
- Ballades (2010)
- Essential (2011)
- Clouseau30 (2017)

=== Covers ===
Belgian X-Factor winner Udo Mechels recorded a cover of Clouseau's version of the song for the album Braveau Clouseau (2007), produced by Hans Francken. The album, a tribute to Clouseau, topped the Belgium (Flanders) Ultratop 200 Albums chart in September 2007 and was certified gold in Belgium on 22 September 2007. Udo performed the song live in 2011 at a concert in Lier, Belgium; Alexandra Soto of Gazet van Antwerpen described Udo's performance of "Heb ik ooit gezegd" as "beautiful".

== Other versions ==
"Have I Told You Lately" has been performed by many notable artists, including:

- A version made by Muzak played at the Austin J. Tobin Plaza on September 11, 2001 at around 7:50 AM, about an hour before American Airlines flight 11 crashed into the North Tower of the World Trade Center Complex.
- Some other known covers of the song are by Kenny Rogers, Barbara Mandrell, Michael Ball, Della Reese and Engelbert Humperdinck; an instrumental cover was also recorded by Floyd Cramer.
- Andy Williams covered it on his album I Don't Remember Ever Growing Up (2007) and performed a live version in 2007 at Royal Albert Hall in London, England.
- Barry Manilow included a version on his album The Greatest Songs of the Eighties, released in November 2008.
- Contemporary jazz/new-age pianist Chris Geith covered the song on his album Timeless World.
- Emilio Navaira released his version as a single from his album Life Is Good, which also included a version in Spanish. His version peaked at No. 62 on the Billboard Hot Country Singles & Tracks chart in 1996.
- Sissel Kyrkjebø covered the song on her 2019 album Reflections, as well as releasing a music video for it in the same year.

== In the media ==
=== Film ===
- "Have I Told You Lately" was featured in the 1996 film, One Fine Day, starring George Clooney and Michelle Pfeiffer.
- The song was played at the end of the Amanda Bynes 2003 film, What a Girl Wants, covered by Matt Acheson.
- The song was featured in the 2014 film 5 Flights Up, starring Morgan Freeman and Diane Keaton.

=== Desert Island Discs selections ===
- Impressionist and comedian Rory Bremner included the song as one of his eight Desert Island Discs on BBC Radio 4 on 20 April 2003.
- Television and radio presenter Gloria Hunniford also included the song on her list on 24 December 2006.

== See also ==
- List of Hot Adult Contemporary number ones of 1993

== Sources ==
- Hinton, Brian (1997). Celtic Crossroads: The Art of Van Morrison. London: Sanctuary. ISBN 1-86074-169-X.
- Hage, Erik (2009). 'The Words and Music of Van Morrison. Praeger Publishers. ISBN 978-0-313-35862-3.
