= Orangefield =

Orangefield may refer to:

- Orangefield, Belfast, a local government ward of Belfast in Northern Ireland
- Orangefield, Texas, an unincorporated town in Orange County, United States
- Orangefield (song), a song written by Northern Irish singer-songwriter Van Morrison and released on his 1989 album Avalon Sunset
- Orangefield House, South Ayrshire, an historic eighteenth century building in Scotland
