= Jan Heylen =

Belgian racing driver (born 1980)

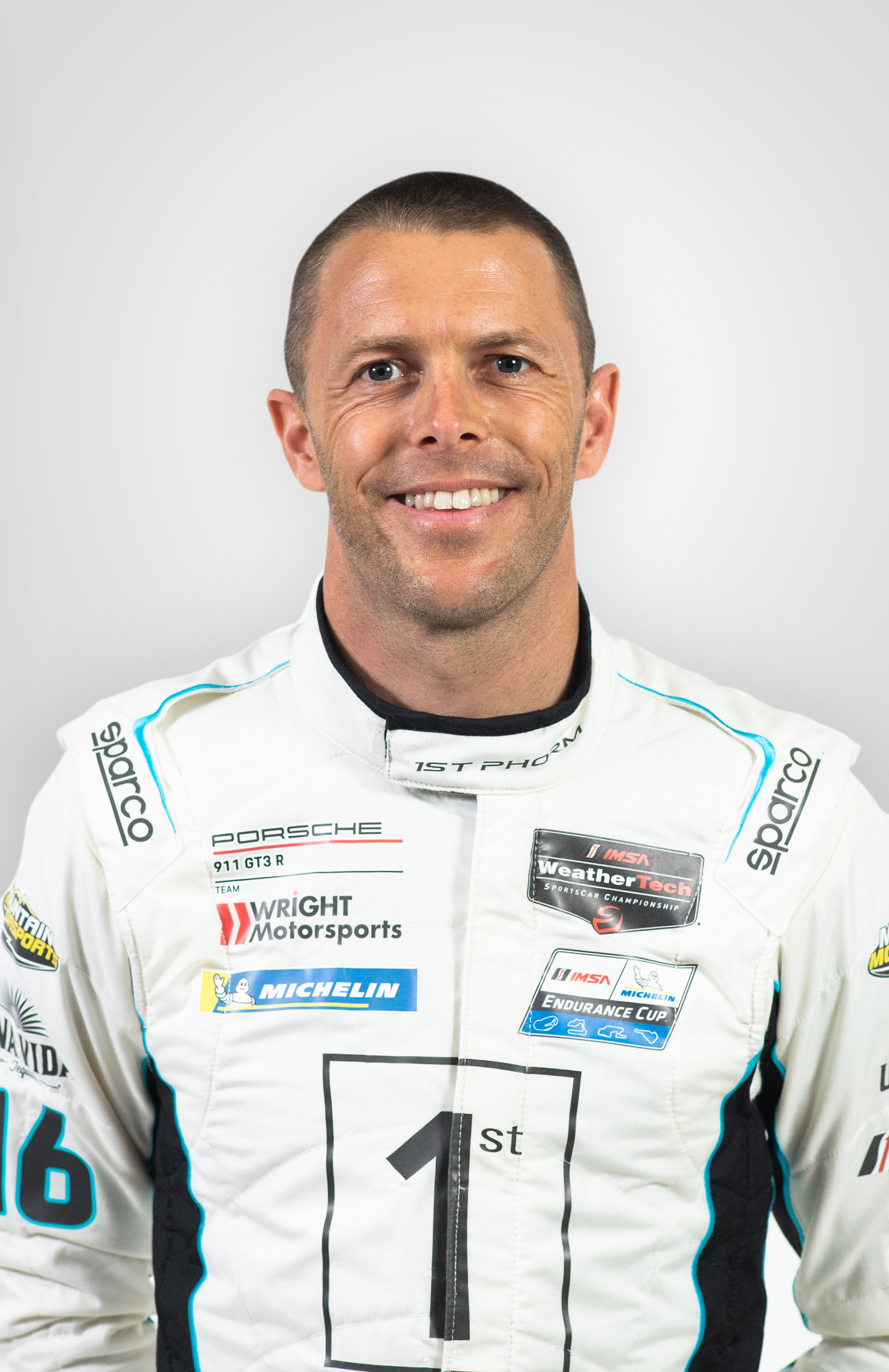
- Nationality: (Belgium) Belgian
- Born: 1 May 1980 (age 46) Geel, Belgium

IMSA SportsCar Championship career
- Current team: Wright Motorsports
- Categorisation: FIA Gold (until 2016, 2022–); FIA Silver (2017–2021)
- Years active: 2014–present
- Teams: The Racers Group, Snow Racing, Park Place Motorsports

Previous series
- 2012-2013 2008-2013 2010 2006-2007 2005 2004 2004 2003 2003 2001-2002: American Le Mans Series; Rolex SportsCar Series; Belgian GT3 Championship, Indy Lites; Champ Car World Series; Eurocup Mégane Trophy; International Formula 3000; German Formula Three; Formula Three Euroseries; Spanish Formula Three; British Formula Ford

Championship titles
- 2021 2005 2002: Michelin Pilot Challenge, Michelin Endurance Cup; Eurocup Mégane Trophy; Formula Ford Festival

Jan Heylen (born 1 May 1980) is a Belgian racing driver, based out of Tampa, Florida.

== Racing career ==
=== Early career (1992-2004) ===
Heylen began karting in 1992, and worked his way up through various feeder series through the years including the British Formula Ford Winter Series (2000), British Formula Ford Championship (2001), Formula Ford Festival, UK Formula Ford Zetec Championship (2002), Formula 3 Spain and Euro (2003), and German Formula 3 (2004). In 2005, he was crowned the Eurocup Mégane Trophy champion. He also won the 2002 Formula Ford Festival at Brands Hatch and has competed in the Formula Three Euroseries. In 2004, Heylen drove in the first four Formula 3000 races of the season with Team Astromega before being replaced by Olivier Tielemans. Following the changeup, Heylen returned to the German Formula 3 series and finished third in the championship with six wins and eight podium finishes.

=== European Sports Car Racing (2005-2011) ===
Through still racing in open-wheel machinery, Heylen started adding sports cars to his racing resume in 2005. That year, he also competed in the Eurocup Megane Trophy, earning seven wins. He also participated in the 24 Hours of Zolder, finishing first with Selleslagh Racing Team. The following season, he raced in a one-off at Spa-Francorchamps in Belcar GT, a national sports car racing championship in Belgium, again securing victory. In 2008, he returned to the 24 Hours of Zolder and Belcar GT with AD sport, racing alongside future Porsche Factory driver Laurens Vanthoor. The 2009 season saw his final attempts at the 24 Hours of Zolder and Spa, resulting in a DNF with AD Sport, and a fourth-place finish with Prospeed Competition, respectively. In 2011, Heylen returned to Prospeed Competition, with co-driver Petri Lappalainen, and the pair earned four top-ten finishes in twelve events, with a season-best of seventh place at Zandvoort, concluding Heylen's full-season efforts in Europe.

=== Champ Car World Series (2006 & 2007) ===
Heylan beat out Nicky Pastorelli for the 2006 Champ Car World Series season at Dale Coyne Racing by bringing sponsorship from the Muermans Group and BergHOFF Worldwide. With Cristiano da Matta as his teammate, Heylen scored a fifth-place finish at the Cleveland Grand Prix, the team's best result to date. Heylen ended the season fourteenth in the standings with a best finish of fifth at the Cleveland Grand Prix. He was unable to find a ride for the first three races of the 2007 season, but was brought on to Conquest Racing to replace Matt Halliday from the fourth race onwards. Despite finishing second—the team's top finish at the time—at TT Circuit Assen, the race would be his final one for the team as he was replaced for the final two races by funded driver Nelson Philippe.

=== North American Sports Car Racing Beginnings (2008-2013) ===
In 2008, Heylen began his North American sports car racing career, driving in the first two Grand-Am Rolex Sports Car Series races, including the 24 Hours of Daytona in Synergy Racing's Porsche 911 in the GT-class. With co-drivers Mark Greenberg, Damien Faulkner, and Lance Arnold, the team finished sixth in class. Heylen returned to the team for the Homestead-Miami round with Steve Johnson, but the pair was unable to finish the race. He went back to Europe in 2011 for a full season in FIA GT, but came back to the United States the following year to compete in the GRAND-AM Rolex Sports Car Series and American Le Mans Series, the top two sports car racing series in North America. In 2012, Heylen competed in a Trans-Am Series race in the GGT class and two Continental Tire Sports Car Challenge races driving a Dodge Challenger, three Rolex Sports Car Series GT-class races in a Dodge Viper, one American Le Mans Series LMP2-class race for Conquest Endurance, and one Pirelli World Challenge race. After running select races in 2012, Heylen raced the majority of the 2013 season in the American Le Mans Series alongside Mike Hedlund in the JDX Porsche. The pair earned three podium finishes that season at Lime Rock Park, downtown Baltimore, and Road Atlanta's Petit Le Mans.

=== Indy Lights (2010) ===
In 2009, Heylen signed on to compete in the Firestone Indy Lights series, driving for Team E. However, the team nor Heylen never appeared on track all season. He attended the 2010 IndyCar Series preseason meetings with Conquest Racing but did not announce a deal with the team. However, the 2010 season saw him drive for Team E, which never happened in 2009, in the 2010 Indy Lights season opener in St. Petersburg. Ironically, he finished second, as he did in his final Champ Car race, to Lights rookie Jean-Karl Vernay. In 2011, Heylen drove in the 24 Hours of Daytona for Starworks Motorsport and made six starts in the FIA GT3 European Championship for Prospeed Competition and finished 27th in points.

=== IMSA WeatherTech SportsCar Championship and SRO America (2014-Present) ===
(Formally the TUDOR United SportsCar Championship and Pirelli World Challenge)

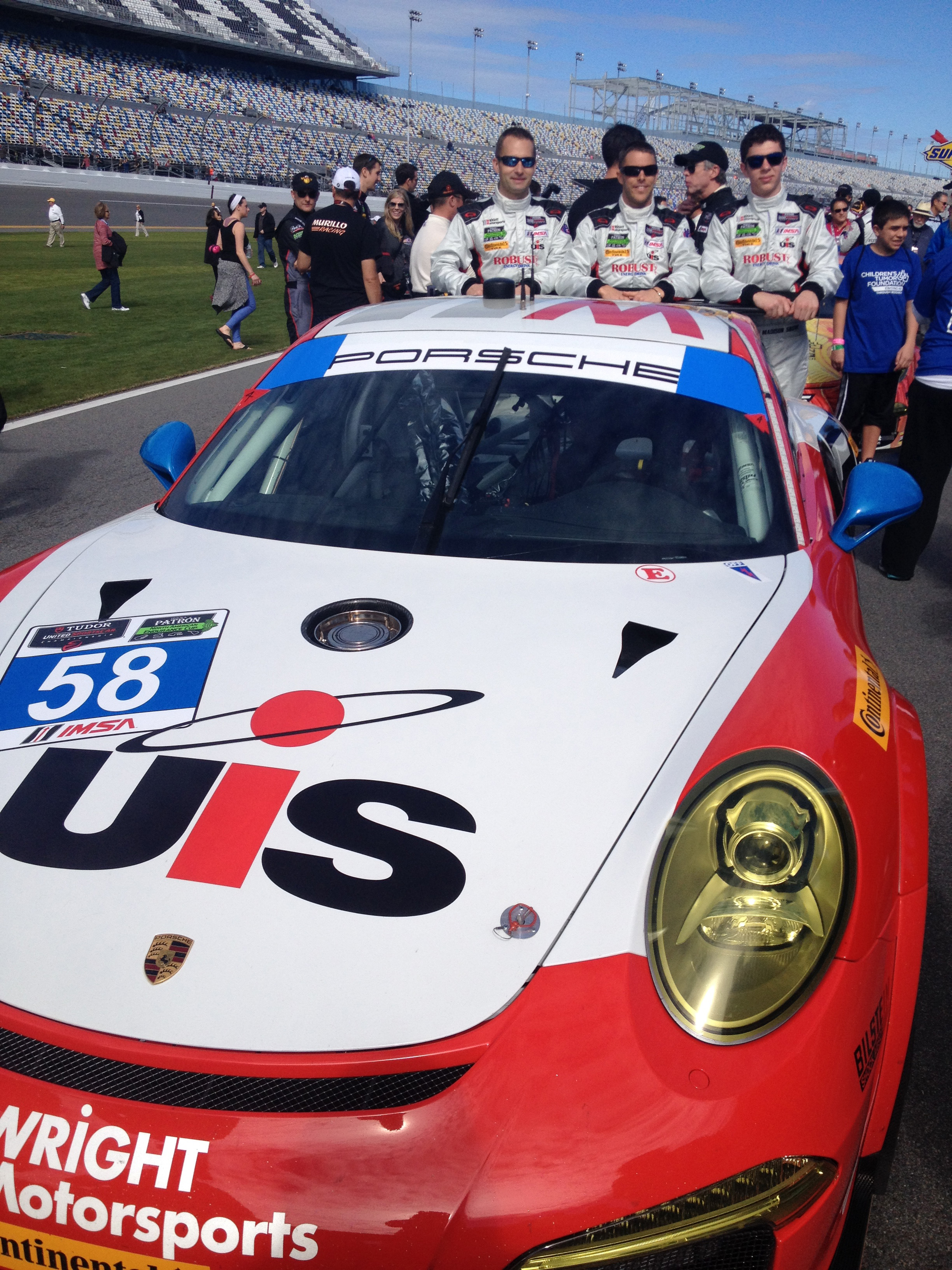
Jan Heylen and co-drivers at Daytona 2014

The 2014 season marked the unification of the GRAND-AM Series and American Le Mans Series, creating the TUDOR United SportsCar Championship. With the exception of the Twelve Hours of Sebring, where he ran with RumBum Racing, Heylen ran the entire season with Snow Racing, in a Porsche fielded by Wright Motorsports. Heylen and co-drivers Madison Snow and Marco Seefried finished in third place in the Rolex 24 At Daytona, as one of only two GTD entries to use only three drivers. Despite only receiving the car weeks before the race, the No. 58 Porsche 911 stayed in the top five for the entirety of the race. The full-season pair of Heylen and Snow returned to the podium again at Road America, then a final time at the season finale, Petit Le Mans, with Patrick Dempsey as the third driver. In 2015, Heylen returned to Wright, running in four races alongside Snow. The highlight of the year came at the Rolex 24 At Daytona, when the pair podiumed for the second consecutive year at the endurance event, this time with co-drivers Patrick Dempsey and Phillip Eng.

While he only competed in one event in 2016, Heylen came back in 2017 with Wright Motorsports for a full season in the Pirelli World Challenge Sprint X GT Pro/Am championship, racing alongside Michael Schein. With three wins and seven podiums, the pair finished second in the team and driver championships. He also participated in three IMSA WeatherTech SportsCar Championship races with TRG and Park Place Motorsports, earning a best finish of fifth place at the Long Beach Grand Prix.

The 2018 and 2019 seasons brought more partial runs to Heylen's resume, running select events in the Continental Tire SportsCar Challenge, the 24H GT Series at Circuit of the Americas, the Chase for the Trigon Trophy TA2 Series, the IMSA Prototype Challenge Presented by Mazda, and the Pirelli GT4 America SprintX Pro/Am championships with VOLT Racing, RS1, Wright Motorsports, and Baker Racing.

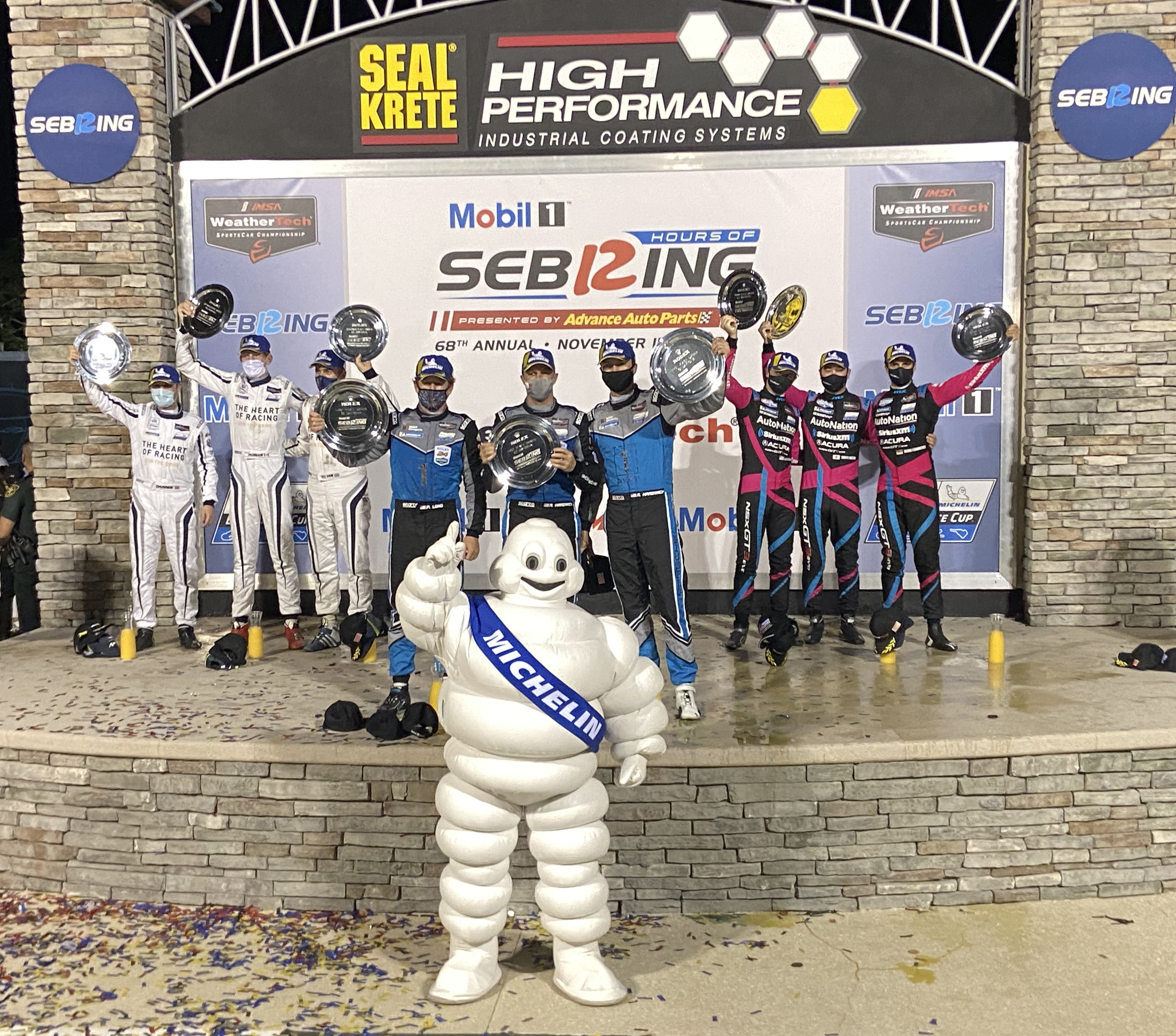
The 2020 Twelve Hours of Sebring podium

Despite the worldwide COVID-19 pandemic and changes to the racing calendar, Heylen's career gained momentum in 2020, where he raced in two full-season efforts and two partial efforts with three different teams. In the Pirelli GT4 America SprintX, where the format involves two drivers sharing a car for a sprint race, he raced again with RS1 alongside Charlie Belluardo. The pair earned four podium finishes at Circuit of the Americas and Indianapolis Motor Speedway. In Michelin Pilot Challenge (formerly Continental Tire SportsCar Challenge), he joined BGB Motorsport with Thomas Collingwood, where the pair had a best-place result of seventh in the 10-race championship. His partnership with Wright Motorsports continued to include three races in the IMSA WeatherTech SportsCar Championship and three in the GT World Challenge America Pro/Am Championship. In IMSA, Heylen joined Ryan Hardwick and Porsche factory driver Patrick Long for three endurance events, earning a third-place finish at Road Atlanta, and the team's first IMSA victory at the 12 Hours of Sebring. Standing in for full-season driver Max Root, Heylen joined Wright driver Fred Poordad for the Circuit of the Americas doubleheader, bringing the No. 20 Porsche 911 GT3 R to two podium finishes. At the season finale event of the Intercontinental GT Challenge's Indianapolis 8 Hour, he joined Poordad and Root, securing victory in the silver class.

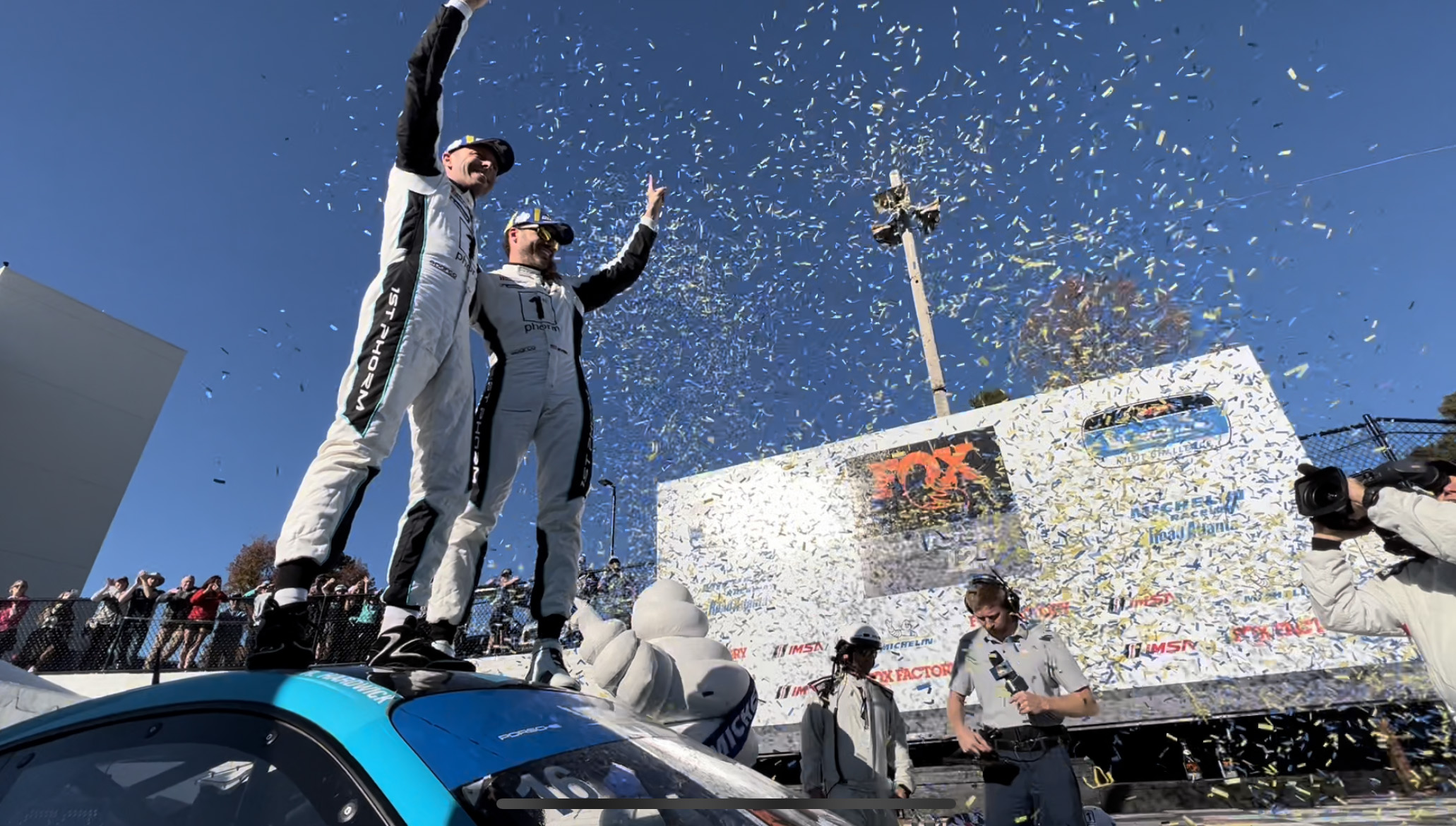
Jan Heylen and Ryan Hardwick Celebrating Michelin Pilot Challenge Championship

Heylen raced solely Wright Motorsport Porsche machinery in 2021, in what proved to be a stand-out year for the Belgian race car driver. In Michelin Pilot Challenge, Heylen signed for a full season with co-driver Ryan Hardwick, through Hardwick had to withdraw out of two events in which Max Root stepped in. After a series of five podium finishes, the No. 16 Wright Motorsports Porsche earned its first of three victories at WeatherTech Raceway Laguna Seca, gaining a foothold in the championship battle against the Turner Motorsports BMW. The championship titles were decided at the season finale at Road America in dramatic fashion when aggressive racing by the BMW withdrew the team from contention and the No. 16 Wright Porsche sailed to victory. With the win, Wright Motorsports became the Team Champion, and Heylen the Driver Champion. In the IMSA WeatherTech SportsCar Championship, Heylen joined fulls season drivers Patrick Long and Trent Hindman in the No. 16 Porsche 911 GT3 R in the GTD class for the four endurance races, earning a second-place finish at the Twelve Hours of Sebring. The trio finished the year with a fifth-place finish at Petit Le Mans, securing the 2021 Michelin Endurance Cup, the endurance championship title within the full-season championship. In GT World Challenge America, Heylen returned to the No. 20 Porsche 911 GT3 R with Fred Poordad for a full-season, finishing in the top five for all thirteen races. The pair earned the 2021 Drivers' Championship title and Wright Motorsports the Team Championship title. The nine championship titles in 2021 earned Heylen the prestigious Porsche Cup award, an annual honor given to the most successful private Porsche driver since 1970. In addition to a trophy to accompany the honor, Heylen was gifted a new Porsche sportscar as well.

In December 2021, Wright Motorsports announced Heylen would run another full season alongside Hardwick, racing the No. 16 Porsche 911 GT3 R in the IMSA WeatherTech SportsCar Championship.

=== Race Steward ===
In addition to being a racing driver, Heylen also acted as Race Director. In 2008 and 2009, Heylen acted as the Volkswagen Jetta TDI Cup chief driving instructor, overseeing the training of thirty drivers between the ages of seventeen and 26, hoping to make it in professional sports car racing. The 2008 season was captured and made into a Reality television documentary called Racing Under Green. In the 2019 season, Heylen returned to a management role, joining the Mazda Road to Indy's USF2000 series as Race Director.

Heylen currently resides in Tampa, Florida.

== Motorsports career results ==
=== Complete Formula 3 Euro Series results ===
Year	Entrant	Chassis	Engine	1	2	3	4	5	6	7	8	9	10	11	12	13	14	15	16	17	18	19	20	DC	Points
2003	Kolles	Dallara F302	Mercedes	HOC; 1; 20	HOC; 2; 18	ADR; 1; 19	ADR; 2; 15	PAU; 1; 10	PAU; 2 DNS	NOR; 1; 11	NOR; 2; 17	LMS; 1; 15	LMS; 2; 15	NÜR; 1 Ret	NÜR; 2 Ret	A1R; 1; 20	A1R; 2; 21	ZAN; 1	ZAN; 2	HOC; 1	HOC; 2	MAG; 1	MAG; 2	28th	0

=== Complete Spanish Formula Three Championship results ===
Year	Entrant	1	2	3	4	5	6	7	8	9	10	11	12	13	DC	Points
2003	Racing Engineering	ALB; 1	ALB; 2	JAR; 1	JAR; 2	JER; 1	JER; 2	EST; 1	EST; 2	VAL; 1	VAL; 2	JER	CAT; 1; 7	CAT; 2; 3	NC	0

=== Complete International Formula 3000 results ===
Year	Entrant	1	2	3	4	5	6	7	8	9	10	DC	Points
2004	Team Astromega	IMO; 11	CAT; 11	MON; 8	NUR; 9	MAG	SIL	HOC	HUN	SPA	MNZ	16th	1

=== ATS Formel 3 Cup results ===
(key) (Races in bold indicate pole position) (Races in italics indicate fastest lap)

Year	Entrant	Chassis	Engine	1	2	3	4	5	6	7	8	9	10	11	12	13	14	15	16	17	18	DC	Points
2004	JB Motorsport	Dallara F302	Opel	HOC; 1	HOC; 2	OSC1; 1	OSC1; 2	ASS; 1	ASS; 2	LAU1; 1; 9	**LAU1**; **2**; 2	**NÜR1**; **1**; 1	**NÜR1**; **2**; 1	**SAC**; **1**; 14	SAC; 2; 2	**NÜR2**; **1**; 1	NÜR2; 2; 1	**LAU2**; **1**; 1	LAU2; 2; 1	**OSC2**; **1**; 5	OSC2; 2; 16	3rd	181

=== American open–wheel racing results ===
==== Champ Car ====
Year	Team	No.	1	2	3	4	5	6	7	8	9	10	11	12	13	14	Rank	Points	Ref
2006	Dale Coyne Racing	11	LBH; 7	HOU; 13	MTY; 16	MIL; 12	POR; 15	CLE; 5	TOR; 16	EDM; 16	SJO; 11	DEN; 11	MTL; 9	ROA; 9	SRF; 14	MXC; 13	**14th**	**140**	
2007	Conquest Racing	34	LVG	LBH	HOU	POR; 15	CLE; 14	MTT; 16	TOR; 13	EDM; 10	SJO; 9	ROA; 6	ZOL; 13	ASN; 2	SRF	MXC	**16th**	**104**	

==== Indy Lights ====
Year	Team	1	2	3	4	5	6	7	8	9	10	11	12	13	Rank	Points	Ref
2010	Team E	STP; 2	ALA	LBH	INDY	IOW	WGL	TOR	EDM	MOH	SNM	CHI	KTY	HMS	**24th**	**40**	

=== Complete 24 Hours of Zolder results ===
Year	Team	Co-Drivers	Car	Class	Laps	Pos.	Class Pos.
2005	(Belgium) Selleslagh Racing Team	(Belgium) Marc Goossens (Netherlands) David Hart (Belgium) Guy Verheyen	Chevrolet Corvette C5-R	GTA	799	1st	1st
2007	(Belgium) AD Sport	(Belgium) Raf Vanthoor (Belgium) Koen Wauters (Belgium) Kris Wauters	Dodge Viper Competition Coupé	Belcar 1	783	4th	3rd
2008	(Belgium) AD Sport	(Belgium) Patrick Schreurs (Belgium) Koen Wauters (Belgium) Kris Wauters	Dodge Viper Competition Coupé	Belcar 1	657	DNF	DNF

=== Complete 24 Hours of Spa results ===
Year	Team	Co-Drivers	Car	Class	Laps	Pos.	Class Pos.
2008	(Belgium) Prospeed Competition	(Belgium) David Dermont (Belgium) Franz Lamot (Belgium) David Loix	Porsche 997 GT3 Cup S	G3	505	16th	4th
2011	(Belgium) Prospeed Competition	(Belgium) Marc Goossens (Belgium) Maxime Soulet	Porsche 997 GT3 R	Pro Cup	331	DNF	DNF
2024	(Antigua and Barbuda) HAAS RT	(France) Simon Gachet (Denmark) Dennis Lind	Audi R8 LMS Evo II	Pro Cup	273	DNF	DNF

=== WeatherTech Sports Series ===
Year	Team	Class	Car	1	2	3	4	5	6	7	8	9	10	11	12	13	14	15	Rank	Points
2008	Synergy Racing	GT	Porsche 997 GT3 Cup	DAY; 6	HOM; DNF	MEX -	VIR -	LAG -	LRP -	WGI -	MOH -	DAY -	BAR -	CGV -	WGI -	SON -	NJP -	UTA -	81st	35
2012	Racers Edge Motorsports	GT	Dodge Viper	DAY; 42	BAR -	HOM -	NJP -	DET -	MOH -	RAM -	WGI -	IMS; 16	WGI -	CGV -	LAG; DNF	LRP -				
2013	Vehicle Technologies	GT	Dodge Viper	DAY; DNF	AUS -	BAR -	ATL -	DET -	WGI -	IMS -	RAM -	KAN -	LAG -	LRP -						

=== American Le Mans Series ===
Year	Team	Class	Car	1	2	3	4	5	6	7	8	9	10	Rank	Points	Ref
2012	Conquest Endurance	P2	Morgan LMP2	SEB; 9	LBH -	LAG -	LRP -	MOS -	MOH -	RAM -	BAL -	VIR -	ATL -	10th	0	
2013	JDX Racing	GTC	Porsche 911 GT3 Cup	SEB -	LBH; 8	LAG; 5	LRP; 2	MOS; 5	RAM; DNF	BAL; 3	AUS; 4	VIR; 4	ATL; 3	4th	108	

=== IMSA ===
Formally TUDOR United SportsCar Championship now IMSA WeatherTech SportsCar Championship

Year	Team	Class	Make	Engine	1	2	3	4	5	6	7	8	9	10	11	12	Rank	Points	Ref
2014	Snow Racing	GTD	Porsche 911 GT America	Porsche 4.0 L Flat-6	DAY; 3	SEB; 9	LAG; 11	DET; 9	WGI; 13	MOS; 7	IMS; 11	ELK; 3	VIR; 9	AUS; 4	PET; 2		7th	280	
2015	Wright Motorsports	GTD	Porsche 911 GT America	Porsche 4.0 L Flat-6	DAY; 3	SEB; 6	LGA	BEL; 8	WGL; 8	LIM	ELK	VIR	AUS	PET			18th	105	
2016	Park Place Motorsports	GTD	Porsche 911 GT3 R	Porsche 4.0 L Flat-6	DAY	SEB; 17	LGA	BEL	WGL	MOS	LIM	ELK	VIR	AUS	PET		61st	15	
2017	TRG	GTD	Porsche 911 GT3 R	Porsche 4.0 L Flat-6	DAY; 10		LBH; 5	AUS	BEL	WGL	MOS	LIM	ELK	VIR	LGA	PET	36th	72	
2017	Park Place Motorsports	GTD	Porsche 911 GT3 R	Porsche 4.0 L Flat-6		SEB; 6											36th	72	
2020	Wright Motorsports	GTD	Porsche 911 GT3 R	Porsche 4.0 L Flat-6	DAY	DAY	SEB	ELK	VIR	ATL; 3	MOH	CLT	PET; 4	LGA	SEB; 1		28th	93	
2021	Wright Motorsports	GTD	Porsche 911 GT3 R	Porsche 4.0 L Flat-6	DAY; 4	SEB; 2	MOH	DET	WGI; 8	WGL	LIM	ELK	LGA	LBH	VIR	PET; 5	21st	1193	
2022	Wright Motorsports	GTD	Porsche 911 GT3 R	Porsche 4.0 L Flat-6	DAY; 1	**SEB**; 10	LBH; 5	LGA; 1	MOH; 9	DET; 7	WGL; 6	MOS	LIM; 6	ELK; 7	VIR; 5	PET; 4	2nd	2875	
2023	Wright Motorsports	GTD	Porsche 911 GT3 R (992)	Porsche 4.2 L Flat-6	DAY; 9	SEB; 6	LBH	MON	WGL; 3	MOS	LIM	ELK	VIR	IMS	PET; 11		24th	1052	
2024	Wright Motorsports	GTD	Porsche 911 GT3 R (992)	Porsche 4.2 L Flat-6	DAY; 7	SEB; 3	LBH	LGA	WGL; 19	MOS	ELK	VIR	IMS; 1	PET; 16			27th	1244	
2025	Magnus Racing	GTD	Aston Martin Vantage AMR GT3 Evo	Aston Martin 4.0 L Turbo V8	DAY	SEB	LBH	LGA	WGL	MOS	ELK	VIR	IMS	PET; 19			88th	133	
2026	RS1	GTD	Porsche 911 GT3 R (992.2)	Porsche 4.2 L Flat-6	DAY; 21	SEB; 10	LBH	LGA	WGL; 9	MOS	ELK; 10	VIR	IMS	PET; 12			35th	1005	

=== IMSA Prototype Challenge ===
Year	Team	Car	Co-Driver(s)	1	2	3	4	5	6	Rank	Points
2018	Baker Racing	Ligier JS P3	Brad Baker	DAY -	SEB; 15	BAR; 14	MOS; 11	VIR -	ATL -	23rd	53

=== Michelin Pilot Challenge Results ===
Year	Team	Car	Co-Driver(s)	1	2	3	4	5	6	7	8	9	10	Rank	Points
2018	RS1	Porsche Cayman GT4 MR	Cavan O'Keefe	DAY -	SEB -	MOH -	WGI -	MOS -	LRP -	RAM -	VIR -	LAG; 18	ATL -	64th	13
2019	RS1	Porsche 718 Cayman GT4 Clubsport	Charlie Luck and Fred Poordad	DAY; 18	SEB -	MOH -	WGI -	MOS -	LRP -	RAM -	VIR -	LAG -	ATL -	72nd	13
2020	BGB Motorsports	Porsche 718 Cayman GT4 Clubsport	Thomas Collingwood and John Tecce	DAY; 16	SEB; 14	RAM; 15	VIR; 13	ATL; 15	MOH; 7	MOH; 13	ATL; 21	LAG; 15	SEB; 16	16th	170
2021	Wright Motorsport	Porsche 718 Cayman GT4 Clubsport	Ryan Hardwick/Max Root	DAY; DNF	SEB; 2	MOH; 2	WGI; 4	WGI; 2	LRP; 3	RAM; 22	LAG; 1	VIR; 1	ATL; 1	1st	2680

=== GT World Challenge America / Pirelli World Challenge ===
Year	Team	Class	Car	Co-Driver(s)	1	2	3	4	5	6	7	8	9	10	11	12	Rank	Points
2017	Wright Motorsports	GT SprintX Pro/Am	Posche 911 GT3 R	Michael Schein	VIR; 3	VIR; 3	MOS; 2	LRP; 1	LRP; 1	UTA; 1	UTA; 6	AUS; 5	AUS; 5	AUS; 3			2nd	214
2020	Wright Motorsports	Pro/Am	Porsche 911 GT3 R	Fred Poordad	AUS -	AUS -	VIR -	VIR -	SON -	SON -	RAM -	RAM -	AUS; 2	AUS; 2			9th	36
2021	Wright Motorsports	Pro/Am	Porsche 911 GT3 R	Fred Poordad	SON; 1	SON; 2	AUS; 2	AUS; 2	VIR; 2	VIR; 2	RAM; 3	RAM; 1	WGI; 5	WGI; 2	SEB; 1	SEB; 3	1st	220

=== GT4 America ===
Year	Team	Class	Car	Co-Driver(s)	1	2	3	4	5	6	7	8	9	10	11	12	13	14	15	16	17	18	Rank	Points
2019	RS1	SprintX Pro/Am	Porsche Cayman GT4 CS-MR	Charlie Bellaurdo	AUS -	AUS -	LAG -	LAG -	VIR -	VIR -	MOS -	MOS -	SON -	SON -	POR -	POR -	WGI; 6	WGI; 9	RAM -	RAM -	LAS -	LAS -	12th	10
2020	RS1	SprintX Pro/Am	Porsche Cayman GT4 CS-MR	Charlie Bellaurdo	AUS; 2	AUS; 3	VIR; 4	VIR; 6	VIR; 8	SON; 10	SON; 10	SON; 6	RAM -	RAM; 10	RAM; 8	AUS; 5	AUS; 2	IMS; 1	IMS; 8				6th	129

=== Intercontinental GT Challenge 8 Hour ===
Year	Team	Class	Car	Co-Drivers	Pos. In Class	Pos. Overall
2020	Wright Motorsport	Silver Cup	Porsche 911 GT3 R	Fred Poordad, Max Root	**1st**	6th
2021	Wright Motorsport	Silver Cup	Porsche 911 GT3 R	Fred Poordad, Max Root	**3rd**	8th

=== Complete 24 Hours of Le Mans results ===
Year	Team	Co-Drivers	Car	Class	Laps	Pos.	Class Pos.
2022	(Germany) Demspey-Proton Racing	(United States) Fred Poordad (United States) Max Root	Porsche 911 RSR-19	GTE; Am	340	38th	5th
2023	(Germany) Proton Competition	(United States) Ryan Hardwick (Canada) Zacharie Robichon	Porsche 911 RSR-19	GTE; Am	28	DNF	DNF

Sporting positions
Preceded by Alan van der Merwe	Formula Ford Festival Winner; 2002	Succeeded by Joey Foster
Preceded by Luca Rangoni (Renault Sport Clio Trophy)	Eurocup Mégane Trophy Champion; 2005	Succeeded by Jaap van Lagen
