= The Best of Me (David Foster song) =

1986 song by David Foster

Single by David Foster

from the album The Best of Me
- Released: February 1983
- Recorded: 1982
- Length: 4:06
- Label: Atlantic
- Songwriters: David Foster, Jeremy Lubbock and Richard Marx

"The Best of Me" is the debut solo single by David Foster, released in February 1983. The ballad was later included as the title track for his debut solo album with the same title, released in November 1983. The song was composed in 1982 by Foster, Jeremy Lubbock and Richard Marx. It has since been recorded by numerous artists, the most notable being Olivia Newton-John, whom Foster chose as his duet partner when he re-recorded the track in 1986, and Cliff Richard, who chose it for his 100th single milestone in 1989.

== David Foster & Olivia Newton-John version ==
"The Best of Me"

Single by David Foster and Olivia Newton-John

from the album David Foster
- Released: May 1986
- Length: 4:08
- Label: Atlantic
- Songwriters: David Foster; Jeremy Lubbock; Richard Marx
- Producers: David Foster; Humberto Gatica

Olivia Newton-John singles chronology
"Toughen Up" (1986)	"The Best of Me" (1986)	"The Rumour" (1988)

Music video
- "The Best of Me" on YouTube

David Foster re-recorded the track with Olivia Newton-John for his 1986 self-titled solo album. It was released as a single and made No. 6 on the Billboard Adult Contemporary chart and No. 80 on the Billboard Hot 100 chart.

=== Track listing ===
1. "The Best of Me" - 4:08
2. "Sajé" - 3:08

=== Charts ===
Chart performance for "The Best of Me"
Chart (1986)	Peak position
Canada Top Singles (RPM)	17
Canadian Adult Contemporary (RPM)|	3
US Billboard Hot 100	80
US Billboard Adult Contemporary	6
US Cash Box Top Singles	81
Quebec (ADISQ)	37

== Cliff Richard version (100th single) ==
"The Best of Me"
- Front cover of standard edition

Single by Cliff Richard

from the album Stronger
- B-side: Move It / Lindsay Jane (all); High Class Baby (12" & CD)
- Released: 30 May 1989
- Recorded: March–April 1989
- Genre: Pop
- Label: EMI
- Songwriters: David Foster, Jeremy Lubbock, Richard Marx
- Producer: Cliff Richard

Cliff Richard singles chronology
"Mistletoe and Wine" (1988)	"The Best of Me" (1989)	"I Just Don't Have the Heart" (1989)

Music video
- "The Best of Me" on YouTube

Alternative cover
- Front cover of special edition

English singer Cliff Richard selected the song for his milestone 100th single in 1989. Released on 30 May 1989, the song debuted at No. 2 on the UK Singles Chart and stayed there another week in its 7-week run on the chart. It was certified silver by the BPI for sales over 200,000.

Before releasing his 100th single, Richard invited 2,000 British fans to the London Palladium for a preview of six songs from his forthcoming album (which would be Stronger), to vote on which one they liked most as the possible 100th single. Ironically, "The Best of Me" came second to "Stronger Than That", but Richard had also revealed by mistake that the latter was composed by Alan Tarney who had written most of Richard's biggest hits since 1979. Regardless, it was enough confirmation for Richard to choose "The Best of Me" with its fitting lyrics as a tribute to his audience. Coming third in the vote was "I Just Don't Have the Heart", ahead of "Joanna" and "Lean on You".

"The Best of Me" was beaten to and kept off the top spot by Jason Donovan's version of Sealed with a Kiss, produced by Stock, Aitken & Waterman. Richard's "I Just Don't Have the Heart" was also written and produced by SAW and, according to a contemporary Record Mirror article, if it had been decided to release the SAW song first, as Richard's 100th single, ".. it is wholly possible and quite probable that they'd have delayed Jason's single to allow Cliff easy access to the top spot." "I Just Don't Have the Heart" was released as the follow-up single in August and reached no.3 in the UK.

=== Charts and certifications ===
==== Weekly charts ====
Chart (1989)	Peak position
Australia (ARIA)	59
Belgium (Ultratop 50 Flanders)	32
Netherlands (Single Top 100)	55
Ireland (IRMA)	2
New Zealand (Recorded Music NZ)	25
UK Singles (Official Charts)	2
West Germany (GfK)	61

==== Year-end charts ====
Chart (1989)	Position
UK Singles (OCC)	84

==== Certifications ====
Region	Certification	Certified units/sales
United Kingdom (BPI)	Silver	200,000^{^}
^{^} Shipments figures based on certification alone.

== Other versions ==
- Kenny Rogers studio track, The Heart of the Matter, 1985
- Phil Perry studio track, The Heart of the Man album, 1991
- Barry Manilow studio track, The Complete Collection and Then Some... album, 1992
- Richard Marx live track, 2010
- Michael Bublé studio track, Crazy Love (Hollywood edition bonus disc) album, 2010
- Paul Potts studio track, Home album, 2014
