= In Stereo =

In Stereo may refer to:

- In Stereo (band), Australian boy band
- In Stereo (Bananarama album), 2019
- In Stereo (Bomfunk MC's album), 1999
- In Stereo (Clouseau album), 1999
- In Stereo (Fenn O'Berg album), 2010
- In Stereo (EP), 2011 EP by Cartel
- "In Stereo", a song by Fort Minor from the 2005 album The Rising Tied
- In Stereo (film), 2015 film
