= Van Morrison at the Movies – Soundtrack Hits =

Greatest hits album by Van Morrison
- Released: 12 February 2007
- Recorded: 1983–2006
- Genre: Rock
- Length: 74:37
- Label: EMI
- Producers: Van Morrison, Roger Waters, Nick Griffiths, Paddy Moloney, Robbie Robertson, Dick Rowe, Ted Templeman

Van Morrison chronology
Live at Austin City Limits Festival (2006)	Van Morrison at the Movies – Soundtrack Hits (2007)	The Best of Van Morrison Volume 3 (2007)

Van Morrison at the Movies – Soundtrack Hits is a compilation album by Northern Irish singer-songwriter Van Morrison, released in 2007 comprising 19 songs as featured in various movies. The album was released on 12 February 2007 in the United Kingdom and 13 February 2007 in the United States. On the U.S. Billboard 200, the album debuted at No. 35, selling about 29,000 copies in its first week, The album also debuted at No. 17 on the UK Top 75 Album Charts.

== Songs ==
All of the songs on the album had been previously released by Morrison, and were recorded by him before being used in a movie, except for one (Comfortably Numb) which first appeared on Roger Waters's The Wall Live in Berlin published in 1990. Two date back to his group Them, before he began to record as a solo artist. Two of the recordings, however, were previously unreleased, including a version of "Brown Eyed Girl" recorded specifically for the collection. The version of the album available for download on iTunes contained the song "These Are the Days". This song was used in the film Nine Months and was originally released on Morrison's 1989 album Avalon Sunset.

== Track listing ==
1. "Gloria" (performed by Them) (from The Outsiders)
2. "Baby, Please Don't Go" (performed by Them) (from Wild at Heart and Good Morning Vietnam)
3. "Jackie Wilson Said (I'm in Heaven When You Smile)" (from The Pope of Greenwich Village and Queens Logic)
4. "Domino" (Live) (from Clean and Sober)
5. "Moondance" (Live) (from An American Werewolf in London) (previously unreleased version)
6. "Queen of the Slipstream" (from Extreme Close-Up)
7. "Wild Night" (from Twenty Four Seven)
8. "Caravan" (Live with The Band – from The Last Waltz, 1976)
9. "Wonderful Remark" (from The King of Comedy)
10. "Brown Eyed Girl" (from Born on the Fourth of July) (previously unreleased version)
11. "Days Like This" (from As Good as It Gets)
12. "Into the Mystic" (Live) (from Dream a Little Dream and Patch Adams)
13. "Hungry For Your Love" (from An Officer and a Gentleman)
14. "Someone Like You" (from French Kiss and Bridget Jones's Diary)
15. "Bright Side of the Road" (from Fever Pitch and Michael)
16. "Have I Told You Lately" (from One Fine Day)
17. "Real Real Gone" (from Donovan Quick)
18. "Irish Heartbeat" (with the Chieftains) (from The Matchmaker)
19. "Comfortably Numb" (Live with Roger Waters, The Band & The Rundfunk Orchestra & Choir – from The Wall Concert in Berlin, 1990) (from The Departed)
- Track 5: Van Morrison vocal overdub 2006, original recording 1986.

=== iTunes extra tracks ===
1. "These Are the Days" (Replaces "Caravan") (from Nine Months)
2. "So Quiet in Here" (from The General)

== Charts ==
Chart (2007)	Peak position
Australian Top 50 Albums	29
Austrian Top 75 Albums	34
Belgium (Flanders) 100 Albums	70
Danish Top 40 Albums	26
German Albums	63
Netherlands Top 100 Albums	16
New Zealand Top 50 Albums	10
Norwegian Top 40 Albums	8
Spanish Top 100 Albums	17
Swedish Top 60 Albums	12
Swiss Top 100 Albums	98
UK Albums Chart	17
US Billboard 200	35
US Digital Albums	35
US Rock Albums	8

== Certifications ==
Certifications for At The Movies - Soundtrack Hits
Region	Certification	Certified units/sales
Ireland (IRMA)	Gold	7,500^{^}
United Kingdom (BPI)	Silver	60,000^{^}
^{^} Shipments figures based on certification alone.
