= These Are the Days (Van Morrison song) =

Single by Van Morrison

from the album Avalon Sunset
- A-side: "Orangefield"
- Released: 1989
- Recorded: February 1989
- Studio: The Townhouse, England
- Genre: Celtic folk, ballad
- Length: 5:08
- Label: Mercury
- Songwriter(s): Van Morrison
- Producer(s): Van Morrison

Avalon Sunset track listing
- 10 tracks: 1. "Whenever God Shines His Light"; 2. "Contacting My Angel"; 3. "I'd Love to Write Another Song"; 4. "Have I Told You Lately"; 5. "Coney Island"; 6. "I'm Tired Joey Boy"; 7. "When Will I Ever Learn to Live in God"; 8. "Orangefield"; 9. "Daring Night"; 10. "These Are the Days"

"These Are the Days" is a song written by Northern Irish singer-songwriter Van Morrison and released on his 1989 album Avalon Sunset. It was released as the B-side of the single with "Orangefield" as the A-side.

== Composition ==
The opening verse of the song is a recurring factor in Morrison's music and lyrics, the belief that the predominant sense of enjoyment and appreciation of life is to be found in the present moment:

These are the days of the endless summer
These are the days, the time is now
There is no past, there's only future
There's only here, there's only now

Biographer John Collis writes that this final song pulls together all the concerns of the album:

In one moment ('there is no past ... there's only now') Morrison combines earthly love with that inspired by a sun-warmed landscape, the yearning for simplicity with the love of 'the (one) Magician who turned water into wine.

== Other releases ==
"These Are the Days" replaces "Caravan" as an iTunes bonus track, on Morrison's 2007 compilation album Van Morrison at the Movies – Soundtrack Hits.

== In the media ==
"These Are the Days" was featured in the 1995 movie, Nine Months, starring Hugh Grant and Julianne Moore.

== Personnel ==
- Van Morrison – vocals, guitar
- Arty McGlynn – guitar
- Neil Drinkwater – accordion, piano
- Clive Culbertson – bass guitar
- Roy Jones, Dave Early – drums, percussion
- Katie Kissoon, Carol Kenyon – backing vocals

== Source ==
- Collis, John (1996). Inarticulate Speech of the Heart, Little, Brown and Company, ISBN 0-306-80811-0
