= Coney Island (Van Morrison song) =

Single by Van Morrison

from the album Avalon Sunset
- B-side: "Have I Told You Lately"
- Released: 1990
- Genre: Celtic, spoken word
- Length: 2:00
- Label: Mercury
- Songwriter: Van Morrison
- Producer: Van Morrison

Van Morrison singles chronology
"Orangefield" (1989)	"Coney Island" (1990)	"Gloria" (1990)

Avalon Sunset track listing
- 10 tracks: 1. "Whenever God Shines His Light"; 2. "Contacting My Angel"; 3. "I'd Love to Write Another Song"; 4. "Have I Told You Lately"; 5. "Coney Island"; 6. "I'm Tired Joey Boy"; 7. "When Will I Ever Learn to Live in God"; 8. "Orangefield"; 9. "Daring Night"; 10. "These Are the Days"

"Coney Island" is a spoken-word song written by Northern Irish singer-songwriter Van Morrison and included on his 1989 album, Avalon Sunset. The narrative is accompanied by lush instrumentation which contrasts with Morrison's thick Ulster brogue.

The singer revisits his youthful trips with his mother to the seaside at Coney Island, in County Down, Northern Ireland. The trip from Belfast in the song names the localities of Downpatrick, St. John's Point, Strangford Lough, Shrigley, Killyleagh, Lecale District and Ardglass. The narrative vividly pictures a bright autumn day of birdwatching, stopping for Sunday papers, and for "a couple of jars of mussels and some potted herrings in case we get famished before dinner." A reviewer noted: "You get a great rush of satisfaction here; in knowing that Van Morrison, despite his long, painful progress towards spiritual election, is still a ravenous foodie at heart."

The village of Shrigley dating back to 1824 was replaced with modern homes and shops after 1968 but a restored village as seen by Morrison and his mother is being planned. The song ends with the spoken words: "Wouldn't it be great if it was like this all the time?"

Cash Box called it "poetic" and an "instant classic."

== Appearance on other albums ==
- It was one of the songs featured on the 1993 compilation album, The Best of Van Morrison Volume Two.
- "Coney Island" has been re-mastered and included on the 2007 3CD limited edition album, Still on Top – The Greatest Hits.

== Personnel ==
- Van Morrison – vocal, guitar
- Clive Culbertson – bass guitar
- Neil Drinkwater – synthesizer
- Roy Jones, Dave Early – drums, percussion
- Arty McGlynn – guitar

== Renditions ==
Liam Neeson performed the song on the 1994 Van Morrison tribute album No Prima Donna: The Songs of Van Morrison, which was also released as a single.

Dustin the Turkey performed a parody of the song titled "Bull Island", which told the story of a day out resulting in his arrest at the end. It was featured on his album Not Just a Pretty Face as well as Dustin's Greatest Hits.

== Sources ==
- Rogan, Johnny (2006). Van Morrison: No Surrender, London:Vintage Books ISBN 978-0-09-943183-1
