= Van Morrison: The Concert =

Video by Van Morrison
- Released: 1990
- Recorded: November 1989
- Genre: Various
- Label: Polygram Music Video Ltd./Caledonia Productions Ltd.
- Director: Jon Small
- Producers: Jon Small, Van Morrison, Jim Greenhough

Van Morrison chronology
Van Morrison in Ireland (1981)	Van Morrison: The Concert (1990)	Live at Montreux 1980/1974 (2006)

Van Morrison: The Concert is the second video released by Northern Irish singer-songwriter Van Morrison, first released in 1990. Recorded in New York City the previous year, the concert featured two special guests and long-time friends Mose Allison and John Lee Hooker, each of whom performed some of their own songs. This video mainly consisted of Morrison's work from his last two albums; including four songs from both Avalon Sunset and Irish Heartbeat. The video also features jazz singer Georgie Fame on Hammond organ. Some reviewers have stated that Van Morrison was not in best shape during the concert, his voice was probably strained by a cold.

== Track listing ==
All songs written and arranged by Van Morrison unless stated otherwise.

1. "I Will Be There" – 2:17
2. "Whenever God Shines His Light" – 5:27
3. "Cleaning Windows" – 3:27
4. "Orangefield" – 2:56
5. "When Will I Ever Learn to Live in God" – 4:18
6. "Benediction" (Mose Allison) – 3:00
7. "Raglan Road" (Traditional) Arr. (Morrison/Paddy Moloney) – 3:44
8. "Carrickfergus" (Traditional) Arr. (Morrison/Moloney) – 3:23
9. "Summertime in England/Common One" – 13:25
10. "Caravan/Birdland" (Morrison), (Joe Zawinul) – 7:31
11. "Moondance/Fever" (Morrison), (John Davenport/Eddie Cooley) – 12:15
12. "Star of the County Down" (Traditional) Arr. (Morrison/Moloney) – 2:14
13. "In the Garden" – 7:33
14. "Have I Told You Lately" – 3:29
15. "Gloria/Smokestack Lightning" (Morrison), (Chester Burnett) – 4:28
16. "Serve Me Right to Suffer/T.B. Sheets" (John Lee Hooker), (Morrison) – 5:22
17. "Boom Boom" (Hooker) – 3:52
18. "She Moved Through the Fair" (Traditional) Arr. (Morrison/Moloney) – 4:57

== Personnel ==
=== The band ===
- Van Morrison – vocals, electric guitar, harmonica
- Georgie Fame – organ, backing vocals
- Bernie Holland – electric and acoustic guitars, backing vocals
- Brian Odgers – bass, backing vocals
- Neil Drinkwater – keyboards, accordion
- Dave Early – drums
- Richie Buckley – vocals on "Common One", soprano and tenor saxophones
- Steve Gregory – tenor and baritone saxophones, flute

=== Special guests ===
- Mose Allison – vocals and keyboard on "Benediction"
- John Lee Hooker – vocals and electric guitar on "Serve Me Right to Suffer" and "Boom Boom"

== Releases ==
The video has been released in VHS format and on laserdisc.

=== Production ===
- Producer and Director – Jon Small
- Producers – Van Morrison, Jim Greenhough
- Photography – The Douglass Brothers
- Design – Bill Smith Studio
