= In Stereo (Clouseau album) =

1999 album by Clouseau

Studio album by Clouseau
- Released: 12 March 1999
- Recorded: October – November 1998
- Studio: Synsound, Brussels
- Genre: pop; rock
- Length: 51:09
- Label: EMI (4999962)
- Producer: Jean Blaute; Kris Wauters

Singles from In Stereo
- 1. "Heb ik ooit gezegd" Released: 29 January 1999; 2. "Niets meer" Released: 5 February 1999; 3. "Altijd meer en meer" Released: 20 August 1999; 4. "Hoe lang nog?" Released: 26 November 1999

In Stereo is the eighth studio album recorded by Belgian pop band Clouseau. The album was produced by Jean Blaute and Kris Wauters, and released through EMI on 12 March 1999.

The album debuted at number one on the Belgium (Flanders) Ultratop 50 chart and remained at the top spot for seven weeks; it stayed in the top ten for 12 weeks, and spent a total of 25 weeks on the chart. It also spent ten weeks on the Netherlands GfK Dutch Chart, peaking at number 28.

In Stereo was certified Platinum (Belgium) on 23 April 1999.

== Background ==
In Stereo continued the successful collaboration of the production team of Kris Wauters and Jean Blaute, along with personnel who had previously worked on Clouseau's other, highly successful, albums. The band had at their disposal a full string orchestra including brass, as well as a group of reputable songwriters including Jan Leyers, Frank Vander linden, and Piet Van den Heuvel.

The album was recorded between October and November 1998 at Synsound Studio in Brussels, Belgium.

== Release ==
In Stereo was released through EMI on 12 March 1999.

== Singles ==
Clouseau is best known for their ballads, and lead singer Koen Wauters was eager to release more lively, upbeat songs. However, "Heb ik ooit gezegd" ("Have I ever told you"), their cover of Van Morrison's romantic ballad "Have I Told You Lately", was chosen as the album's lead single. The song was released on 29 January 1999 and peaked on the Belgium Ultratop 50 at number seven, and peaked at number 68 on the Dutch charts. The song was certified Gold in Belgium.

The album's second single, "Niets meer" ("Nothing anymore"), was released on 5 February 1999. It peaked at number 29 on the Dutch charts, and remained on the charts for nine weeks.

The third single, "Altijd meer en meer" ("Always more and more"), was released on 20 August 1999. It peaked at number 39 on the Belgium Ultratop 50 chart, and remained on the chart for five weeks.

The album's final single, "Hoe lang nog" ("How long?"), was released on 26 November 1999, but did not chart.

== Track listing ==
Track listing adapted from Hung Medien

No.	Title	Writer(s)	Length
1.	"Altijd meer en meer"	Kris Wauters, Mark Vanhie	3:27
2.	"Hoe lang nog?"	Jan Leyers, Kris Wauters, Vanhie	4:35
3.	"Heb ik ooit gezegd"	Van Morrison, Koen Wauters (lyrics, Dutch), Yurek Onzia (lyrics, Dutch)	4:17
4.	"Blijf bij mij"	Kris Wauters, Vanhie	3:39
5.	"Ik, jij, hij of zij"	Frank Vander linden, Leyers	4:20
6.	"Wat ik voor je voel"	Wauters, Wauters, Vanhie	4:27
7.	"Eenzaam hart"	Vander linden, Leyers	3:47
8.	"Hoeveel is te veel?"	Piet Van den Heuvel	4:02
9.	"Iemand zoals jij"	Vander linden, Leyers	3:14
10.	"Niets meer"	Kris Wauters, Vanhie	4:00
11.	"Zij kan me troosten"	Leyers	2:33
12.	"Voltooid verleden"	Peter Seghers, Onzia	5:29
13.	"Witte"		0:18
14.	"Zo mooi"	Kris Wauters	3:01
Total length:			51:09

== Personnel ==
Personnel list adapted from The Belgian Pop & Rock Archives and the Flanders Music Centre

- Koen Wauters – lead vocals
- Kris Wauters – keyboards
- Jan Leyers - backing vocals
- Mark Vanhie - backing vocals
- Dany Caen - backing vocals
- Jean Blaute – guitar, Hammond organ, piano
- Eric Melaerts – guitar
- Kevin Mulligan – guitar
- Leonardo Amuedo – acoustic guitar
- Evert Verhees – bass guitar
- Vincent Pierins – bass guitar
- Walter Mets – drums
- Eddie Conard – percussion
- Thierry Crommen - harmonica
- Guyri Spies – orchestral arrangement
- Yannic Fonderi – loop, drum and synth programming

== Chart performance ==
In Stereo debuted on the Belgium (Flanders) Ultratop 50 chart on 20 March 1999 at number one, becoming Clouseau's twelfth number one album on the Belgian Flemish charts. The song remained at the top spot for seven weeks, then finally dropped out of the top ten on 12 June 1999. It exited the chart at number 49 on 4 September 1999 after spending a total of 25 weeks on the chart, 12 of which were in the top ten, and seven of which were at the top of the Ultratop 50.

In the Netherlands, In Stereo entered the Dutch charts at number 81 on 20 March 1999, peaking three weeks later at number 28 on 3 April 1999. The song dropped out at number 78 on 22 May 1999, after a total of 10 weeks on the chart.

== Charts ==
=== Weekly charts ===
Chart (1999)	Peak position
Belgian Albums (Ultratop Flanders)	1
Dutch Albums (Album Top 100)	28

=== Year-end charts ===
Chart (1999)	Position
Belgian Albums (Ultratop Flanders)	5

== Certifications ==
In Stereo was certified Gold on 19 March 1999 for sales in excess of 10,000 units, and certified Platinum on 26 March 1999 for sales in excess of 20,000 units.

== Other releases ==
In Stereo was re-released on 25 March 2011 as a "2 For 1" double CD, which also included the re-release of Clouseau's 2004 album Vanbinnen.
