= Whenever God Shines His Light =

Single by Van Morrison and Cliff Richard

from the album Avalon Sunset
- B-side: "I'd Love to Write Another Song"
- Released: 27 November 1989
- Recorded: 20 February 1989
- Studio: The Townhouse, England
- Genre: Gospel
- Length: 4:58
- Label: Mercury
- Songwriter: Van Morrison
- Producer: Van Morrison

Van Morrison singles chronology
"Have I Told You Lately" (1989)	"Whenever God Shines His Light" (1989)	"Orangefield" (1989)

Cliff Richard singles chronology
"Lean on You" (1989)	"Whenever God Shines His Light" (1989)	"Stronger Than That" (1990)

Avalon Sunset track listing
- 10 tracks: 1. "Whenever God Shines His Light"; 2. "Contacting My Angel"; 3. "I'd Love to Write Another Song"; 4. "Have I Told You Lately"; 5. "Coney Island"; 6. "I'm Tired Joey Boy"; 7. "When Will I Ever Learn to Live in God"; 8. "Orangefield"; 9. "Daring Night"; 10. "These Are the Days"

Music video
- "Whenever God Shines His Light" on YouTube

"Whenever God Shines His Light" is a song written by Northern Irish singer-songwriter Van Morrison and released on his 1989 album Avalon Sunset as a duet with Cliff Richard. Although the album was released in June 1989, this song was released as a single in November 1989 for the Christmas sales market. Morrison and Richard performed the duet on the British music chart television show, Top of the Pops. The single charted at No. 20 on the UK Singles Chart and No. 3 on the Irish Singles Chart. AllMusic critic Jason Ankeny describes it as a "standout opener" to Avalon Sunset. Critic Patrick Humphries describes it as "the most manifest example of Morrison's Christian commitment," claiming that although it "is not one of Morrison's most outstanding songs" it works as "a testament of faith". Cash Box said that "if George Harrison can have a hit single while invoking his sweet Lord, Van could do it with the totally engaging 'Whenever God Shines His Light.'"

== Appearances on other albums ==
- The Best of Van Morrison (1990)
- Still on Top – The Greatest Hits (2 disc U.K. edition)
- Van Morrison The Concert (1990)

== Personnel ==
- Van Morrison – vocals, guitar
- Cliff Richard – vocals
- Arty McGlynn – guitar
- Neil Drinkwater – piano
- Steve Pearce – bass guitar
- Roy Jones – drums, percussion
- Dave Early – drums, percussion

== Covers ==
- Aled Jones
- Waterdeep
- Danish Radio Big Band
- Marc Roberts

== Sources ==
- Rogan, Johnny (2006). Van Morrison: No Surrender, London:Vintage Books ISBN 978-0-09-943183-1
