= I Just Don't Have the Heart =

Single by Cliff Richard

from the album Stronger
- B-side: "Wide Open Space"
- Released: August 14, 1989
- Recorded: Jan–Feb 1989
- Genre: Dance-pop
- Label: EMI
- Songwriter: Stock Aitken Waterman
- Producer: Stock Aitken Waterman

Cliff Richard singles chronology
"The Best of Me" (1989)	"I Just Don't Have the Heart" (1989)	"Lean on You" (1989)

Music video
- "I Just Don't Have the Heart" on YouTube

"I Just Don't Have the Heart" is a song by British singer Cliff Richard, released as the second single from his 1989 album Stronger. It was written and produced by Stock Aitken Waterman (SAW) and became another UK top ten hit for him, peaking at number three.

== Background and writing ==
Richard first approached SAW at a music industry awards lunch, where he complimented them on their work with Rick Astley, and suggested they contact him if they had any more songs as good. After agreeing to work together, Richard had to be convinced to come into the studio without first hearing the song, as SAW did not record demos, and preferred to develop their music while their vocalists were in the recording booth. Richard only agreed to release the track after his milkman had heard it and deemed it a hit, a process he claimed he used regularly, and always worked.

== Critical reception ==
=== Initial reviews ===
David Giles of Music Week gave a negative review of "I Just Don't Have the Heart", saying: "Cliff crashes to earth with a bump and teams up with SAW. The result is a standard SAW somp, putting one of pop's great legends on a level with Sonia". A review of Richard's Stronger in the same magazine considered the song as the "worst" track of the album and a "SAW abberation" [sic]. MTV Australia host Richard Wilkins pulled the video off air mid-play, controversially disparaging both the track and its high-profile producers. When reviewing the single, Stephen Duffy of Record Mirror wrote: "The white dance pop perfection of SAW. Cliff sounds a little out of place on this speedy little number. How will he moonwalk to this? Not as good as Kylie".

More positively, before releasing his 100th single, Richard invited 2,000 British fans to the London Palladium for a preview of six songs from his album Stronger to choose the one they liked the most as the possible 100th single, and "I Just Don't Have the Heart" ranked at the third position. Similarly, a review in Pan-European magazine Music & Media presented "I Just Don't Have the Heart" as an "happy and cheerful chart-bound pop music, produced by Stock, Aitken & Waterman" and ranked it in the "sure hits" category. In a review published in Smash Hits, Swedish pop rock duo Roxette stated that although not being big fans of SAW, they deemed the song would be a hit with a "winning formula" and added it recalled Donna Summer's "This Time I Know It's for Real" with another chorus.

=== Retrospective response ===
In 2017, Christian Guiltenane of British magazine Attitude praised the song as being "a corker; catchy, melodic and totally joyful", but criticized the "vintage clip". In 2019, James Masterton described "I Just Don't Have the Heart" as a "lilting dance-pop track replete with house rhythms, a multiplicity of Cliff's on choral vocals and an inevitable killer chorus" with "a genious club appeal"; he deemed it as "the Stock-Aitken-Waterman writing and production team at their finest, gifting a true living legend a pop record worthy of his pedigree", and added it became "a true guilty pleasure for many". In 2025, Thomas Edward of Smooth Radio ranked the song 14th in his list of "Stock Aitken Waterman's 15 greatest songs, ranked", adding: "The dance-pop number showed Cliff at his energetic best, taking a confident stride into the present".

== Chart performance ==
"I Just Don't Have the Heart" was the second most successful single from Stronger, behind "The Best of Me". In Richard's home country, it entered the UK Singles Chart at number ten on 26 August 1989, jumped to a peak of number three and charted for eight weeks, earning a silver certification awarded by the British Phonographic Industry. It also peaked inside the top ten in Ireland where it reached number seven, and remained on the chart for six weeks. Although it topped the chart in Luxembourg, the single met with less success in Continental Europe, being a top-20 hit in Finland and Austria where it attained number 15 and 18, respectively, and a top-25 hit in the Flanders region of Belgium. It missed the top 40 by one place in Germany where it had a 16-week chart run, stalled at number 67 in the Netherlands and barely entered the top 100 in Australia. On the Pan-European Hot 100 Singles chart compiled by Music & Media, it debuted at number 38 on 2 September 1989, climbed straight to a peak of number 11 due to its sales in the UK and Ireland, and totaled ten weeks on the charts. Mostly aired on UK, French, German and Austrian radios, it reached number nine on the European Airplay Top 50 on which it charted for nine weeks.

== Track listing ==
- UK single
1. "I Just Don't Have the Heart" – 3:27
2. "Wide Open Space" – 4:38
3. "I Just Don't Have the Heart" (instrumental) – 4:00
- 12" single (12 EMP 101)
1. "I Just Don't Have the Heart" (extended version) – 5:54
2. "Wide Open Space" – 4:38
3. "I Just Don't Have the Heart" – 4:00

== Charts ==
=== Weekly charts ===
Weekly chart performance for "I Just Don't Have the Heart"
Chart (1989)	Peak position
Australia (ARIA)	100
Austria (Ö3 Austria Top 40)	18
Belgium (Ultratop 50 Flanders)	25
Europe (Eurochart Hot 100)	11
Europe (European Airplay Top 50)	9
Finland (Suomen virallinen lista)	15
France (SNEP)	77
Ireland (IRMA)	7
Luxembourg (Radio Luxembourg)	1
Netherlands (Single Top 100)	67
UK Singles (Official Charts)	3
UK Dance (Music Week)	2
West Germany (GfK)	41

=== Year-end charts ===
Year-end performance for "I Just Don't Have the Heart"
Chart (1989)	Position
UK Singles (OCC)	80

== Certifications ==
Certifications for "I Just Don't Have the Heart"
Region	Certification	Certified units/sales
United Kingdom (BPI)	Silver	200,000^{^}
^{^} Shipments figures based on certification alone.
