= Orangefield (song) =

Single by Van Morrison

from the album Avalon Sunset
- B-side: "These Are the Days"
- Released: December 1989
- Recorded: 1989
- Genre: Celtic
- Length: 3:50
- Label: Mercury
- Songwriter(s): Van Morrison
- Producer(s): Van Morrison

Van Morrison singles chronology
| "Whenever God Shines His Light" (1989) | "Orangefield" (1989) | "Coney Island" (1990) |

Avalon Sunset track listing
- 10 tracks: 1. "Whenever God Shines His Light"; 2. "Contacting My Angel"; 3. "I'd Love to Write Another Song"; 4. "Have I Told You Lately"; 5. "Coney Island"; 6. "I'm Tired Joey Boy"; 7. "When Will I Ever Learn to Live in God"; 8. "Orangefield"; 9. "Daring Night"; 10. "These Are the Days"

"Orangefield" is a song written by Northern Irish singer-songwriter Van Morrison and released on his 1989 album Avalon Sunset. The song takes place on "a golden autumn day" and is named for the school for boys (now Orangefield High School) that Morrison attended during his youth in Belfast, Northern Ireland.

The song was also a minor hit in the Netherlands, charting at number 70.

== Recording and composition ==
"Orangefield" was recorded in summer 1988 at Eden Studios in London with Mick Glossop as engineer.

Brian Hinton gave his interpretation of the song and lyrics as: "In 'Orangefield' we're back in the territory of Astral Weeks in both historical and psychic terms ... she was the apple of his eye—both fruitful (like the name of his school) and Eve tempting him to sin—and her beauty becomes like the sun, or God."

Another biographer, Clinton Heylin defined the song: "Certainly in 'Orangefield', another installment in Morrison's perennial paean to a 'lost love in Belfast', the words say very little but the mood is persuasive. Back in touch with the spirit of yesteryear, he walks through the old park remembering 'a golden autumn day' [when] you came my way in Orangefield."

== Other releases ==
"Orangefield" was one of the songs performed on the 1990 video Van Morrison The Concert.

== Personnel ==
- Van Morrison – vocals, guitar
- Arty McGlynn – guitar
- Neil Drinkwater – piano
- Clive Culbertson – bass guitar
- Roy Jones, Dave Early – drums, percussion
- Katie Kissoon, Carol Kenyon – backing vocals

== Renditions ==
"Orangefield" was performed by Duke Special at his concert in St George's Market on 2 December 2008.

== Sources ==
- Heylin, Clinton (2003). Can You Feel the Silence? Van Morrison: A New Biography, Chicago Review Press ISBN 1-55652-542-7
- Hinton, Brian (1997). Celtic Crossroads: The Art of Van Morrison, Sanctuary, ISBN 1-86074-169-X
