= Stronger (Cliff Richard album) =

1989 studio album by Cliff Richard

Studio album by Cliff Richard
- Released: 30 October 1989
- Recorded: 1988–1989
- Studio: RG Jones, London; PWL Studios; Battery, London
- Genre: Pop
- Length: 50:43
- Label: EMI
- Producer: Alan Tarney; Paul Moessl; Cliff Richard; Stock Aitken Waterman; Aswad

Cliff Richard chronology
Private Collection: 1979–1988 (1988)	Stronger (1989)	From a Distance: The Event (1990)

Singles from Stronger
- 1. "The Best of Me" Released: May 1989; 2. "I Just Don't Have the Heart" Released: August 1989; 3. "Lean on You" Released: October 1989; 4. "Stronger Than That" Released: February 1990

Professional ratings
Review scores
Source	Rating
AllMusic	4/5 stars
Smash Hits	5/10

Stronger is the 29th studio album by British singer Cliff Richard, released in October 1989. The album was produced by Alan Tarney and includes the singles "The Best of Me"(UK No. 2), "I Just Don't Have the Heart" (UK No. 3), "Lean on You" (UK No. 17) and "Stronger Than That" (UK No. 14). The album reached platinum, peaking at number 7 on the UK Albums Chart.

== Track listing ==
1. "Stronger Than That" (Alan Tarney) – 4:42
2. "Who's in Love" (Alan Tarney) – 4:31
3. "The Best of Me" (David Foster, Jeremy Lubbock, Richard Marx) – 4:11
4. "Clear Blue Skies" (Dave Cooke, Chris Turner) – 2:54
5. "Lean on You" (Alan Tarney) – (5:03)
6. "Keep Me Warm" (Alan Tarney) – (4:24)
7. "I Just Don't Have the Heart" (Stock, Aitken, Waterman) – 3:27
8. "Joanna" (Chris Eaton) – 3:52
9. "Everybody Knows" (Alan Tarney) – 3:48
10. "Forever You Will Be Mine" (Alan Tarney) – 4:25
11. "Better Day" (Alan Tarney) – 4:49
12. "Share a Dream" (with Aswad) (Rod Trott, Jon Sweet, Richard Osborne) – 4:30

2004 remastered CD bonus tracks

13. "Wide Open Space" (Judith Walmsley, Martin Abbot) – 4:37
14. "I Just Don't Have the Heart" (Instrumental) – 4.00
15. "Hey Mister" (Alan Tarney) – 3:56
16. "Lindsay Jane" (Cliff Richard) – 4:44
17. "Marmaduke" (Trevor Spencer, Alan Tarney) – 5:28

== Charts ==
=== Weekly charts ===
Chart (1989–1990)	Peak position
Australian Albums (ARIA)	16
Danish Albums (Hitlisten)	2
German Albums (Official Top 100)	53
Irish Albums (IRMA)	2
New Zealand Albums (RMNZ)	3
UK Albums (OCC)	7

=== Year-end charts ===
Chart (1989)	Position
UK Albums (OCC)	38

== Certifications ==
Region	Certification	Certified units/sales
Australia (ARIA)	Gold	35,000^{^}
New Zealand (RMNZ)	Platinum	15,000^{^}
United Kingdom (BPI)	Platinum	300,000^{^}
^{^} Shipments figures based on certification alone.
