= Clouseau (band) =

Belgian band

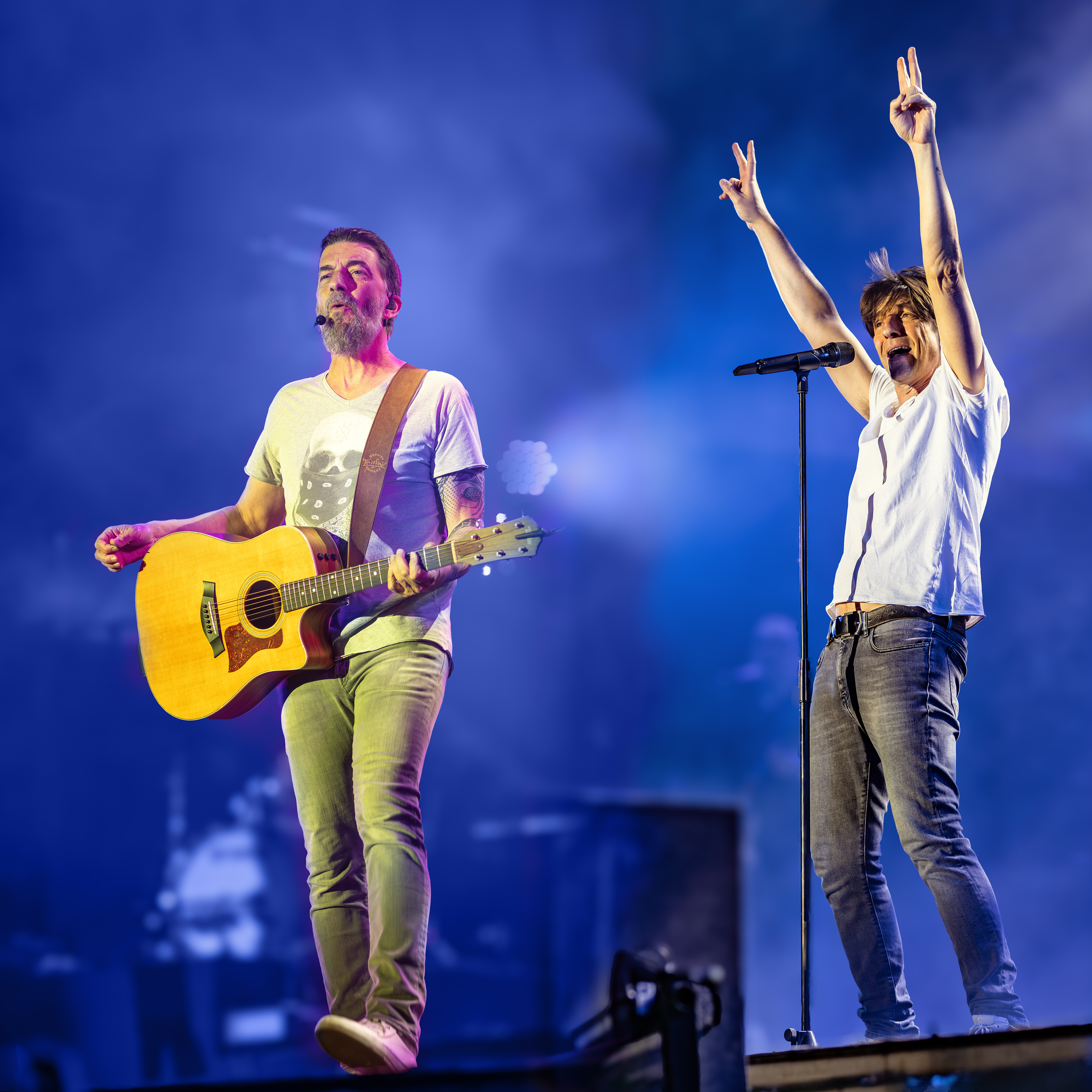
- Kris (left) and Koen (right) in Affligem Belgium

Background information
- Origin: Belgium
- Genres: Rock, pop, dance
- Years active: 1984–present
- Members: Kris Wauters; Koen Wauters
- Past members: Tjen Berghmans; Karel Theys; Bob Savenberg
- Website: https://www.clouseau.be

Clouseau is a Flemish pop and rock group, having success in Belgium and the Netherlands since being established in the late 1980s. Apart from a brush with English material in the early 1990s they perform in Dutch. Their biggest hits are "Daar gaat ze" ("There she goes", a #1 hit in the Netherlands in 1990, and rerecorded in English as "Close Encounters") and "Passie" ("Passion", a #1 hit in the Netherlands in 1995).

== History ==
=== 1987–1991 ===
Clouseau was set up by Bob Savenberg, who named the band after Inspector Clouseau, a character he enjoyed imitating and after whom he had named his radio station.

Initially, Clouseau only performed at local venues. Singer Koen Wauters soon left the group to sing for another local band, but in 1987 he was persuaded to return.

The same year they were discovered at the Marktrock festival in Leuven, Belgium. Their first single "Brandweer" ("Firemen", also a pun that can be interpreted as "Burning again") sold 427 copies. Their television debut followed in November of that year.

In 1989 Clouseau participated in the Belgian tryouts for the Eurovision Song Contest with the song "Anne". Clouseau came in second, but "Anne" became an enormous hit in Belgium and a (minor) hit in the Netherlands. The popularity of Clouseau in Belgium skyrocketed, and that year Clouseau produced its first album, "Hoezo?" ("Whaddayamean?").

In 1990 "Daar gaat ze" topped the singles charts in both Belgium and the Netherlands; several more hits followed. On 30 September, Tjen Berghmans left the group after a dispute. In October 1990, Clouseau released their second album, Of zo... (Or so...). In March 1991, Karel Theys departed, leaving Clouseau as a three-piece.

In May 1991, Clouseau represented Belgium in the Eurovision Song Contest 1991, finishing 16th out of 22 with the song "Geef het op", but their participation resulted in a European breakthrough.

=== 1991–1999 ===
Afterwards it was announced that Koen Wauters was called up for the army; because of his Clouseau-commitments he only had to serve four weeks and didn't need to shave his head. Fall 1991, Clouseau released their first English language album; Close Encounters (of which the title track is a translation of "Daar gaat ze") was a huge success in Germany. The Dutch fans were less keen on the idea of Koen Wauters singing in another language and rather bought the live-album that was released during this period.

In 1992 Clouseau released a Dutch-language album, Doorgaan (Keep on going). At the same time, they supported Swedish group Roxette on their European tour performing the Close Encounters-material.

The second English-language album, 1993's In every small town was recorded in Los Angeles. However, the album failed critically, receiving little attention outside the Benelux countries. Since then, Clouseau has refrained from producing English-language music (except for occasional singles, e.g. "Weather With You" (Crowded House cover) in 2000).

In 1995 they released the Oker album, which featured the single "Passie". In 1996, founder Bob Savenberg left the group. At the time he hosted the television format of the Ultratop 50. Bob Savenberg now works with upcoming artists as a manager.

In September 1996 Clouseau released the Adrenaline album, which was promoted with a large tour.

On 22 December 1998 singer Koen Wauters married the Dutch television journalist and one-time MTV-presenter Carolyn Lilipaly (they divorced in 2002). 1999 saw the release of In Stereo. Clouseau were heading for a new direction. A live album was released in 2000, and Clouseau were touring Belgium and the Netherlands.

=== 2000–2009 ===
In 2001, Clouseau released the disco oriented CD En Dans (And Dance); the artwork was designed by Marcel Vanthilt and the title track became a huge hit. Whilst the fans were waiting for new material, the two remaining bandmembers presented the 2003 and 2004 editions of Idool (the Belgian version of Idols) on VTM. In October 2004 they released the Vanbinnen (Inside) album.

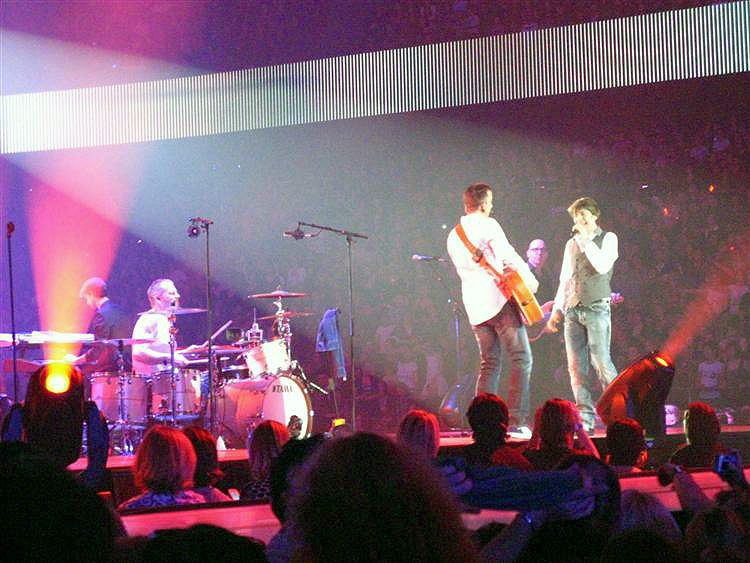
Clouseau performing in December 2009

Since 2002 Clouseau are playing multiple Christmas shows at the Sportpaleis Antwerp. These concerts are a huge success with tickets selling out well in advance and each year's series surpassing the previous. In 2005, 13 shows attracted over 200,000 visitors in total. Due to Koen's Dakar-participation they couldn't add any further dates.

In 2006 Clouseau performed in Antwerp at the 0110 concerts for tolerance, organised by Tom Barman, singer/guitarist with dEUS. At that moment seven shows were added for that year's Christmas stint (Clouseau Speciale Editie).

The band released their latest CD Vonken & Vuur (Sparks & Flames) in March 2007 with "De Tegenpartij" ("The Opposition Party") being the first single. The Dutch release followed a month later.

Their 20th anniversary was celebrated with the tribute album Braveau Clouseau.

On 5 December 2008 Clouseau played the first of their Crescendo Christmas-shows.

In 2009 they expressed their tiredness of Belgian communal tensions in a pro-Belgium song, a novelty in Flemish commercial popular culture. They toured across railway-stations and festivals which included their first show in the Netherlands in nine years.

=== 2010–present ===
In 2017 a documentary was aired in honour of their 30th anniversary.

In 2023, they gave a surprise performance at Pukkelpop. They posed as a Finnish power pop duo named Tarkastaja. After the first song, the brothers took off their masks and announced themselves to the audience. During a ‘Back to the 80s, 90s & Nillies’ event that year, they performed a record of 125 times in the Sportpaleis in Antwerp, each time in front of an average of 15,000 spectators

To celebrate their 40th anniversary, the band announced ten Sportpaleis-concerts in December 2024 and January 2025.

== Honours and awards ==
- Radio 2 Summer Hit:
  - Overall hit: 1989 (Anne)
  - Best Dutch-language song: 1989 (Anne), 2002 (En dans), 2011 (Gek op jou), 2014 (Vliegtuig)
  - Oeuvre prize: 2004
  - Best videoclip: 2007 (Vonken & vuur), 2009 (Wat een leven)
  - Best performance: 2008 (Crescendo concerts)
- ZAMU Music Awards
  - Best Dutch-language artist: 1995
  - Most popular band: 2001
  - Best song: 2002 (En Dans)
  - Best live-act: 2004
- TMF Awards
  - Best pop: 1999, 2002, 2003, 2007, 2009
  - Beste live-act: 2003, 2004
  - Lifetime Achievement Award: 2007
- Radio 2 Hall of Fame
  - 2005 (Anne), 2014 (Daar gaat ze)
- Music Industry Awards
  - Best band: 2007, 2008, 2019
  - Best live act: 2008
  - Best Dutch-language artist: 2013
- QMusic Thx to You Awards 2021: Biggest Flemish band from 20 years of Q

Clouseau-albums are regularly certified gold and platinum. One of their most successful albums is the best-of compilation Clouseau 20 from 2007, which has already achieved five-times platinum status.

Flemish tribute bands include Cluzo and Kloezo.

== Members ==
- Tjen Berghmans (up to September 1990)
- Karel Theys (up to March 1991)
- Bob Savenberg (up to 1996)
- Kris Wauters
- Koen Wauters

== Band ==
- Jos Michiels (Percussion)
- David Thomaere (Keyboards)
- Herman Cambré (Drums)
- Eric Melaerts (Guitar)
- Tom Lodewyckx (Guitar)
- Vincent Pierens (Bass Guitar)

== Discography ==
=== Albums ===
- Hoezo? (1989)
- Of zo... (1990)
- Close Encounters (1991)
- Live '91 (1991)
- Doorgaan (1993)
- In Every Small Town (1993)
- Het Beste van (1993)
- Oker (1995)
- Adrenaline (1996)
- 87- 97 (1997)
- In Stereo (1999)
- Live (2000)
- Ballades (2001)
- En Dans (2001)
- Live in het Sportpaleis DVD ("Live at the Sport Palace, Antwerp") (2003)
- Vanbinnen (2004)
- Clouseau in 't lang DVD ("Live at the Sport Palace, Antwerp") (2006)
- Vonken en Vuur (2007)
- Zij Aan Zij (2009)
- Clouseau (2013)
- Clouseau Danst (2016)
- Tweesprong (2019)
- Jonge wolven (2022)

=== Singles ===
Year	Single	Peak chart positions			Album
Year	Single	BEL (FL)	NLD	GER	Album
1987	"Brandweer"	—	—	—	Hoezo?
1987	"Ze zit achter me aan"	—	—	—	Hoezo?
1988	"Alleen met jou"	25	—	—	Hoezo?
1988	"Mary-Lou"	—	—	—	Hoezo?
1989	"Anne"	1	47	—	Hoezo?
1989	"Dansen"	6	—	—	Hoezo?
1990	"Daar gaat ze"	1	2	—	Hoezo?
1990	"Louise"	9	12	—	Hoezo?
1990	"Wil niet dat je weggaat"	12	9	—	Hoezo?
1990	"Heel alleen"	3	18	—	Of Zo...
1990	"Domino"	4	7	—	Of Zo...
1991	"Ik wil vannacht bij je slapen"	27	28	—	Of Zo...
1991	"Oh Ja"	—	—	—	Of Zo...
1991	"Geef het op" (from Eurovision Songcontest 1991)	4	13	—	87*97
1991	"Hilda"	7	29	—	Non-album single
1992	"Close Encounters"	—	—	19	Close Encounters (European release)
1992	"Anna"	—	—	51	Close Encounters (European release)
1992	"Louise"	—	—	82	Close Encounters (European release)
1992	"Nathalie"	—	—	—	Close Encounters (European release)
1992	"Altijd heb ik je lief"	6	9	—	Doorgaan (Tot je niet meer op je benen kan staan)
1992	"Vanavond ga ik uit"	9	19	—	Doorgaan (Tot je niet meer op je benen kan staan)
1992	"Ben je daar vannacht"	16	51	—	Doorgaan (Tot je niet meer op je benen kan staan)
1992	"Als je me wil"	29	—	—	Doorgaan (Tot je niet meer op je benen kan staan)
1992	"Afscheid van een vriend"	12	—	—	Doorgaan (Tot je niet meer op je benen kan staan)
1993	"Live Like Kings"	9	—	78	In Every Small Town
1993	"Take Me Down"	9	—	93	In Every Small Town
1993	"Worship"	22	—	—	In Every Small Town
1994	"Caroline"	31	—	—	In Every Small Town
1994	"I Live In Memories"	—	—	—	In Every Small Town
1994	"Piece of Candy"	—	—	—	In Every Small Town
1995	"Laat me nu toch niet alleen"	7	4	—	Oker
1995	"Voorbij"	27	—	—	Oker
1995	"Swentibold"	18	—	—	Oker
1995	"Passie"	7	1	—	Oker
1995	"Zie me graag"	4	10	—	Oker
1995	"1 miljoen vlinders"	—	48	—	Oker
1996	"Samen"	—	26	—	Adrenaline
1996	"Nobelprijs"	2	33	—	Adrenaline
1996	"Je bent niets"	27	—	—	Adrenaline
1997	"Dat ze de mooiste is"	18	78	—	Adrenaline
1997	"Kom naar jou"	—	81	—	Adrenaline
1997	"Door de muur"	25	69	—	87 * 97
1999	"Niets meer"	—	59	—	In Stereo
1999	"Heb ik ooit gezegd"	7	68	—	In Stereo
1999	"Ik, jij, hij of zij"	—	—	—	In Stereo
1999	"Altijd meer en meer"	39	—	—	In Stereo
1999	"Hoe lang nog?"	—	—	—	In Stereo
2000	"Weather with You"	—	—	—	Clouseau Live
2001	"Onvergetelijke nacht"	—	—	—	Ballades
2001	"Ik geef me over"	13	—	—	En dans
2001	"En dans"	15	81	—	En dans
2002	"Brandend avontuur"	50	100	—	En dans
2002	"Bergen en ravijnen"	—	—	—	En dans
2004	"Vanbinnen"	2	—	—	Vanbinnen
2004	"Ik denk aan jou"	6	—	—	Vanbinnen
2005	"Hier bij jou"	10	—	—	Vanbinnen
2005	"Ik zie de hemel"	3	20	—	Ballades
2006	"Weg van jou"	13	—	—	Vonken & vuur
2006	"Vonken & vuur"	1	—	—	Vonken & vuur
2007	"De tegenpartij"	4	—	—	Vonken & vuur
2007	"Oogcontact"	—	—	—	Vonken & vuur
2007	"Casanova (Wen er maar aan)"	35	—	—	Vonken & vuur
2008	"Wat een leven"	11	—	—	Non-album single
2009	"Leve België"	16	—	—	Zij aan zij
2009	"Zij aan zij"	—	—	—	Zij aan zij
2010	"Als er ooit iets fout zou gaan"	—	—	—	Zij aan zij
2010	"De juiste vergissing"	—	—	—	Zij aan zij
2010	"Gek op jou"	23	—	—	Ballades 2010
2013	"Vliegtuig"	1	—	—	Clouseau
2014	"Kan het niet alleen"	—	—	—	Clouseau
2014	"Laatste keer"	—	—	—	Clouseau
2014	"Ziel"	—	—	—	Clouseau
2014	"Onvoorwaardelijk wij"	—	—	—	Clouseau
2015	"Zin om te bewegen"	9	—	—	Clouseau danst
2016	"Droomscenario"	31	—	—	Clouseau danst
2016	"Vogel voor de kat"	48	—	—	Clouseau danst
2016	"Tijd om te leven"	—	—	—	Clouseau danst
2017	"Ik wil je terug" (live)	4	—	—	Clouseau30
2017	"Helemaal alleen" (live)	35	—	—	Clouseau30
2017	"Alles voor mij" (live)	25	—	—	Clouseau30
2019	"Tijdmachine"	23	—	—	Tweesprong
2019	"Heel mijn hart"	44	—	—	Tweesprong
2019	"Tweesprong"	26	—	—	Tweesprong
2020	"Wereld die nooit vergaat"	52	—	—	Tweesprong
2020	"California"	44	—	—	Tweesprong
2021	"Eén keer in een leven"	35	—	—	Jonge wolven
2022	"Stil"	34	—	—	Jonge wolven
2022	"Vage herinnering"	36	—	—	Jonge wolven
2024	"Vuurwerk"	43	—	—	Non-album single
"—" denotes single that did not chart or was not released.

Preceded by Philippe Lafontaine with "Macédomienne"	Belgium in the Eurovision Song Contest; 1991	Succeeded by Morgane with "Nous, on veut des violons"
