= Lean on You =

Single by Cliff Richard

from the album Stronger
- B-side: "Hey Mister"
- Released: October 2, 1989
- Recorded: Mar–Apr 1989
- Studio: RG Jones, London, UK
- Genre: Pop
- Label: EMI
- Songwriter: Alan Tarney
- Producer: Alan Tarney

Cliff Richard singles chronology
"I Just Don't Have the Heart" (1989)	"Lean on You" (1989)	"Whenever God Shines His Light" (1989)

Music video
- "Lean On You" on YouTube

"Lean on You" is a song by British singer Cliff Richard, released as the third single from his 1989 album Stronger. It was written and produced by Alan Tarney. The song peaked at No. 17 on the UK Singles Chart.

== Track listing ==
UK single

7-inch vinyl (including limited edition picture disc)

1. "Lean on You" (4:50)
2. "Hey Mister" (3:54)

12-inch vinyl

1. "Lean on You" (Extended Mix) (8:15)
2. "Lean on You" (4:50)
3. "Hey Mister" (3:54)

CD Single

1. "Lean on You" (Extended Mix) (8:15)
2. "Lean on You" (5:02)
3. "Hey Mister" (3:54)

== Personnel ==
As per the booklet for the Stronger CD:

- Cliff Richard - lead and backing vocals
- Alan Tarney - writer, producer, arranger, backing vocals
- Gerry Kitchingham - engineer
- Ben Robbins - assistant engineer

== Charts ==
Chart (1989)	Peak position
Australia (AMR)	93
Germany (GfK)	60
Ireland (IRMA)	10
Netherlands (Single Top 100)	66
UK Singles (OCC)	17
