= Stronger Than That =

Single by Cliff Richard

from the album Stronger
- A-side: "Stronger Than That"
- B-side: "Joanna"
- Released: 12 February 1990
- Genre: Pop
- Label: EMI Records
- Songwriter(s): Alan Tarney
- Producer(s): Alan Tarney

Cliff Richard singles chronology
"Whenever God Shines His Light" (1989)	"Stronger Than That" (1990)	"Silhouettes" (1990)

Music video
- "Stronger Than That" on YouTube

"Stronger Than That" is a song by English singer Cliff Richard, released in 1990 as the fourth single from his 1989 album Stronger. It reached the top twenty in the UK, peaking at No. 14 on the UK Singles Chart.

== Track listing ==
7-inch vinyl and cassingle

1. "Stronger Than That" [Remix]
2. "Joanna"

7-inch vinyl and CD Single

1. "Stronger Than That" [Extended Version]
2. "Joanna"
3. "Stronger Than That" [Remix]

== Chart performance ==
Chart	Peak position
Australia (ARIA Charts)	140
Belgium (Ultratop 50 Flanders)	36
Europe (Eurochart Hot 100)	39
Ireland (IRMA)	8
Luxembourg (Radio Luxembourg)	13
UK Singles (OCC)	14
