= Nine Months =

1995 film by Chris Columbus

- Theatrical release poster
- Directed by: Chris Columbus
- Screenplay by: Chris Columbus
- Based on: Neuf mois 1994 movie by Patrick Braoudé
- Produced by: Michael Barnathan; Anne François; Mark Radcliffe; Chris Columbus
- Starring: Hugh Grant; Julianne Moore; Tom Arnold; Joan Cusack; Jeff Goldblum; Robin Williams
- Cinematography: Donald McAlpine
- Edited by: Raja Gosnell
- Music by: Hans Zimmer
- Production company: 1492 Pictures
- Distributed by: 20th Century Fox
- Release date: July 12, 1995
- Running time: 103 minutes
- Country: United States
- Language: English
- Box office: $138.5 million

Nine Months is a 1995 American romantic comedy film produced, written, and directed by Chris Columbus. The film stars Hugh Grant, Julianne Moore, Tom Arnold, Joan Cusack, Jeff Goldblum, and Robin Williams. It is a remake of the French film, Neuf mois, and served as Grant's first US starring role. It was filmed on location in the San Francisco Bay Area. The original music score was composed by Hans Zimmer. It was released by 20th Century Fox on July 12, 1995, and received mixed reviews from critics, grossing $138.5 million worldwide.

== Plot ==
Child psychologist Samuel Faulkner is in a long-term relationship with ballet teacher Rebecca Taylor. This changes when Rebecca declares that she is pregnant. When questioned by Samuel about her birth control, she replies that birth control is only 97% effective.

Samuel's fears mount due to his encounters with overbearing couple Marty and Gail Dwyer and their three young unruly daughters, as well as the confusing advice he receives from Sean, his perpetually single artist friend and Gail's brother. Samuel is confused and unsure about what to do. Feeling that Samuel is not ready to be a father, Rebecca leaves him and moves in with Marty and Gail (who is also pregnant with a fourth child). Samuel tries to contact her, but she ignores him. Sean encourages him to move on, with Samuel trying new things, like rollerblading, getting an earring, and going to parties. But the thought of Rebecca still weighs heavily on his mind.

When a woman makes a move on Samuel at a party, he declines, saying that he is not ready to move on yet. He views an ultrasound of his soon-to-be-born son, and decides that it is time to take responsibility before it is too late. He sells his Porsche, buys a family car, and reconciles with Rebecca, much to Gail's delight.

Samuel and Rebecca wed, and not long afterward, they go out to dinner. During an awkward moment when they bump into the woman whom he met earlier at the party, Rebecca goes into labor. They rush to the hospital, where they meet Marty and Gail; who has gone into labor as well. Rebecca gives birth to their baby boy, who they name Clyde, and Gail gives birth to their fourth daughter, who they name Bonnie.

== Cast ==
- Hugh Grant as Samuel Faulkner
- Julianne Moore as Rebecca Taylor-Faulkner
- Tom Arnold as Marty Dwyer
- Joan Cusack as Gail Dwyer
- Jeff Goldblum as Sean Fletcher
- Robin Williams as Dr. Kosevich
- Mia Cottet as Lili
- Joey Simmrin as Truman
- Ashley Johnson as Shannon Dwyer
- Alexa Vega as Molly Dwyer
- Aislin Roche as Patsy Dwyer
- Zelda Williams as Little Girl No. 3 in Ballet Class
- Charles Martinet as Arnie the Dinosaur
- Kristin Davis as Tennis Attendant
- Ngaio Bealum as Sean's party guest
- Priscilla Alden as Older Woman
- Betsy Aidem as Gail's Nurse

== Production ==
Nine Months was filmed in the San Francisco area, including Marin County, Napa Valley, and Oakland, beginning in October 1994.

=== Music ===
- "The Time of Your Life"
  - Written by Steve Van Zandt
  - Performed by Little Steven
- "These Are the Days"
  - Written and Performed by Van Morrison
- "Let's Get It On"
  - Written by Marvin Gaye and Ed Townsend
  - Performed by Marvin Gaye
- "Baby, I Love You"
  - Written by Phil Spector, Ellie Greenwich and Jeff Barry
  - Performed by The Ronettes
- "Turn Back the Hands of Time"
  - Written by Bonnie F. Thompson and Jack Daniels
  - Performed by Tyrone Davis
- "19th Nervous Breakdown"
  - Written by Mick Jagger and Keith Richards
  - Performed by The Rolling Stones

== Reception ==
=== Box office ===
The movie debuted at number 3 at the box office, behind Apollo 13 and Under Siege 2: Dark Territory, with $12.5 million in its opening weekend. Nine Months went on to gross $138.5 million worldwide.

=== Critical response ===
On the review aggregator website Rotten Tomatoes, 24% of 37 critics' reviews are positive. The website's consensus reads: "Nine Months finds writer-director Chris Columbus playing to his worst comedic instincts—and relying far too heavily on the trademark tics of his miscast leading man." Metacritic, which uses a weighted average, assigned the film a score of 47 out of 100, based on 23 critics, indicating "mixed or average" reviews. Audiences surveyed by CinemaScore gave the film an average grade "A−" on scale of A+ to F.

Roger Ebert of the Chicago Sun-Times gave the film two stars out of four, saying: "Nine Months is one of those movies where the outcome is abundantly clear to everyone but the hero, who remains in the hapless position of playing dumb because, if he didn't, there wouldn't be a plot." His review, and that of Gene Siskel, referenced Grant's then-recent arrest for receiving oral sex from Estella Marie Thompson. Roger's said "the film's box-office performance will be closely analyzed for clues about whether Grant's career will be affected by the recent scandal. My guess is that the film, left to itself, would have performed only moderately at the box office, so if it does any better than that, the scandal can only have helped." Gene Siskel's, in the Chicago Tribune, said that "frankly [Grant's] arrest for consorting with a hooker does limit our enjoyment of this fear-of-commitment comedy. We watch Grant, searching his face for clues to his behavior, instead of buying into his character. What if he hadn't been arrested? Nine Months would still turn up lame because of its obvious plotting and the constantly irritating presence of Tom Arnold as a much-too-cheerful neighbor." He also remarked that Grant's "halting, blinking, stammering manner, which seemed so appealing in Four Weddings and a Funeral, comes across as mannered here. Obviously, we are going to have trouble for a while accepting him as an innocent. A better fit is his next role, in An Awfully Big Adventure, in which he plays a theatrical director with a controlling mean streak."

Todd McCarthy of Variety called it "an exceedingly safe and conventional Chris Columbus comedy".

=== Hugh Grant's opinion ===
Grant has spoken disparagingly of his performance in Nine Months, stating in an interview with the SAG-AFTRA, "I really ruined it. And it was entirely my fault. I panicked, it was such a big jump up from what I'd been paid before to what they were offering me. And the scale was inhuman to my standards, you know the scale of the production, 20th Century Fox, the whole thing. And I just tried much too hard, and you know I forgot to do basic acting things, like mean it. So I pulled faces and overacted, it was a shocker."

On another occasion, Grant referred to director Chris Columbus as a "genius" and his "brilliant" co-stars, but further commented, "You know, having been paid £20,000 or whatever it was, to do Four Weddings and a Funeral, if you're suddenly paid millions, you think well I better ramp up my performance by 200 times. But all that means is that you overact grotesquely, which is what I did. So I'm always very apologetic to those people."

Grant said that his disappointment at his performance in Nine Months, following a preview of the film, led him to "a Ken Russell kind of lunch" and a sex act with Divine Brown in Los Angeles in 1995.
