= Avalon Sunset =

Studio album by Van Morrison
- Released: June 2, 1989
- Recorded: November − December 1988
- Studios: The Wool Hall (Beckington, UK); Eden (London, UK); Olympic (London, UK); Westside (London, UK); Townhouse (London, UK)
- Genres: Folk rock, new-age, gospel
- Length: 42:22
- Label: Mercury
- Producer: Van Morrison

Van Morrison chronology
| Irish Heartbeat (1988) | Avalon Sunset (1989) | The Best of Van Morrison (1990) |

Singles from Avalon Sunset
- 1. "Have I Told You Lately" b/w "Contacting My Angel" Released: June 1989; 2. "Whenever God Shines His Light" b/w "I'd Love to Write Another Song" Released: November 1989; 3. "Orangefield" b/w "These Are the Days" Released: December 1989; 4. "Coney Island" b/w "Have I Told You Lately" Released: January 1990

Avalon Sunset is the nineteenth studio album by Northern Irish singer-songwriter Van Morrison. It was released in 1989 by Mercury Records to both commercial and critical success. In 2008, Avalon Sunset was reissued and remastered, featuring an alternate take of "Whenever God Shines His Light", and a version of "When the Saints Go Marching In" with additional lyrics by Morrison.

== Recording ==
This album was recorded in England at The Wool Hall, Eden Studios, Olympic Studios, Westside Studio, and Townhouse Studios. It marked the first appearance of Georgie Fame with Morrison. Fame played the Hammond organ and also provided backup vocals and helped direct the band.

The all new songs were rehearsed in two days and then recorded in another two days. Arty McGlynn (the guitarist) remarked about the band's feelings when the sessions ended "we still don't know if it's an album, or maybe a demo for an album." Morrison's reliance on spontaneity was evident on "Daring Night" where he can be heard calling out chord changes "one-four, one-four" (Gmaj to Cmaj) to Roy Jones near the song's ending. The album was previewed at a private concert at Ronnie Scott's Jazz Club In London on 24 May 1989.

== Music and lyrics ==
On Avalon Sunset, Rob Sheffield wrote, Morrison sang about God and love in a scat-influenced style, set against a musical backdrop of mellow folk rock. According to Donald Clarke, the album combined "religiosity and Celtic feeling, a sort of superior New Age music".

The album opens with "Whenever God Shines His Light", a duet with Cliff Richard; also issued as a single, it charted at No. 20 in the UK. The album contains the religious ballad "Have I Told You Lately" which became a hit single for Morrison, reaching No. 12 on the Adult Contemporary Charts, and was a bigger hit for Rod Stewart in 1993. This song was included on Morrison's 2007 album, Van Morrison at the Movies – Soundtrack Hits. Brian Hinton compares the idyllic female in "Orangefield" to Beatrice in the Divine Comedy.

== Release and reception ==
Professional ratings
Review scores
| Source | Rating |
|---|---|
| AllMusic | 3.5/5 stars |
| Chicago Tribune | 3/4 stars |
| The Encyclopedia of Popular Music | 4/5 stars |
| Hi-Fi News & Record Review | A*:1 |
| The Rolling Stone Album Guide | 4/5 stars |
| The Village Voice | A− |

Avalon Sunset was one of Morrison's most commercially successful albums, and his fastest-selling record in the United Kingdom, being certified gold soon after its release. The album was also met with critical acclaim. In a review for The Village Voice, Robert Christgau said Morrison has found new inspiration in more temporal themes, especially on the album's first side, although he cited the redemption-themed "Whenever God Shines His Light" as his most exuberant song since 1982's "Cleaning Windows". Spin magazine's Karen Schoemer called it an elegantly orchestrated record void of pain: "He celebrates nature, love and poetry too; this is contemplation without conflict, remembrances without bitterness. And no matter how esoteric things get, a charged sensuality permeates." In the Chicago Tribune, Greg Kot said "I'd Love to Write Another Song" is a return to his 1960s and 1970s peak; on what is an otherwise good showcase for his insightful vocal delivery of simple yet evocative lyrics and a style of music that "strikes an artful middle ground between the visceral joys of Top 40 and the soothing aural wallpaper of New Age."

At the end of 1989, Christgau named Avalon Sunset the 22nd best album of the year in his list for the annual Pazz & Jop critics poll. The Times ranked it 63rd in its 1993 list of "All Time Top 100 Albums". In The Encyclopedia of Popular Music (2006), Colin Larkin wrote that the record featured "quite immaculate love songs" from Morrison, along with a prominent sense of spirituality and nostalgia throughout, while Morrison biographer Erik Hage called it "a powerful statement [showing] the often turbulent muse had stabilized, and was now a sublime force flowing through Van Morrison". AllMusic's Jason Ankeny was less enthusiastic and found it somewhat inconsistent but "nevertheless the work of a master craftsman, its lush orchestration and atmospheric production casting an irresistibly elegant spell".

== Track listing ==
All songs written by Van Morrison, except where noted.

1. "Whenever God Shines His Light" (duet with Cliff Richard) – 4:58
2. "Contacting My Angel" – 4:57
3. "I'd Love to Write Another Song" – 2:52
4. "Have I Told You Lately" – 4:20
5. "Coney Island" – 2:00
6. "I'm Tired Joey Boy" – 2:29
7. "When Will I Ever Learn to Live in God" – 5:38
8. "Orangefield" – 3:50
9. "Daring Night" – 6:10
10. "These Are the Days" – 5:08

=== CD reissue bonus tracks ===
1. "Whenever God Shines His Light" – 3:51 (Alternate take)
2. "When the Saints Go Marching In" – 6:01 (Traditional, arr. by Morrison)

== Personnel ==
- Van Morrison – vocal, guitar, producer
- Arty McGlynn – guitar
- Clive Culbertson – bass guitar
- Steve Pearce – bass guitar
- Georgie Fame – Hammond organ
- Neil Drinkwater – accordion, piano, synthesizer
- Stan Sulzmann – alto saxophone
- Alan Barnes – baritone saxophone
- Henry Lowther – trumpet
- Cliff Hardie – trombone
- Roy Jones – drums, percussion
- Dave Early – drums, percussion
- Carol Kenyon – backing vocals
- Katie Kissoon – backing vocals
- Cliff Richard – vocal on "Whenever God Shines His Light"
- Gavyn Wright – string section leader
- Fiachra Trench – brass and string arrangements
- Mick Glossop – mixing and engineering

== Charts ==
| Chart | Peak position |
|---|---|
| Australian Albums (ARIA) | 30 |
| Dutch Albums (Album Top 100) | 8 |
| German Albums (Offizielle Top 100) | 35 |
| New Zealand Albums (RMNZ) | 18 |
| Norwegian Albums (VG-lista) | 11 |
| Swedish Albums (Sverigetopplistan) | 10 |
| UK Albums (Official Charts) | 13 |
| US Billboard 200 | 91 |

== Certifications ==
| Region | Certification | Certified units/sales |
|---|---|---|
| Canada (Music Canada) | Gold | 50,000^{^} |
| Netherlands (NVPI) | Gold | 50,000^{^} |
| United Kingdom (BPI) | Gold | 100,000^{^} |
| United States (RIAA) | Gold | 500,000^{^} |
^{^} Shipments figures based on certification alone.

== Sources ==
- Hage, Erik (2009). The Words and Music of Van Morrison, Praeger Publishers, ISBN 978-0-313-35862-3
- Heylin, Clinton (2003). Can You Feel the Silence? Van Morrison: A New Biography, Chicago Review Press, ISBN 1-55652-542-7
- Hinton, Brian (1997). Celtic Crossroads: The Art of Van Morrison, Sanctuary, ISBN 1-86074-169-X
