= Clive Culbertson =

British musician

Clive Culbertson (born 28 August 1954, Ballymoney, County Antrim, Northern Ireland) is a mystic, musician, healer and the founder of The Order of Druids in Ulster. He trained with his friend and teacher, the late Ben McBrady, Aircinneac and Herenach of "The Old Gaelic Order". Culbertson was given a lineage of authority from McBrady to start his own order.

Culbertson is a bassist, vocalist, songwriter, recording engineer and record producer. He has recorded and toured with many artists – among his list of credits are White Roxx, Van Morrison and The Chieftains and the Avalon Sunset album. Currently he is bassist/vocalist and musical director with country rock band, New Moon, of which he is also a founder member.
