= Kris Wauters =

Belgian musician

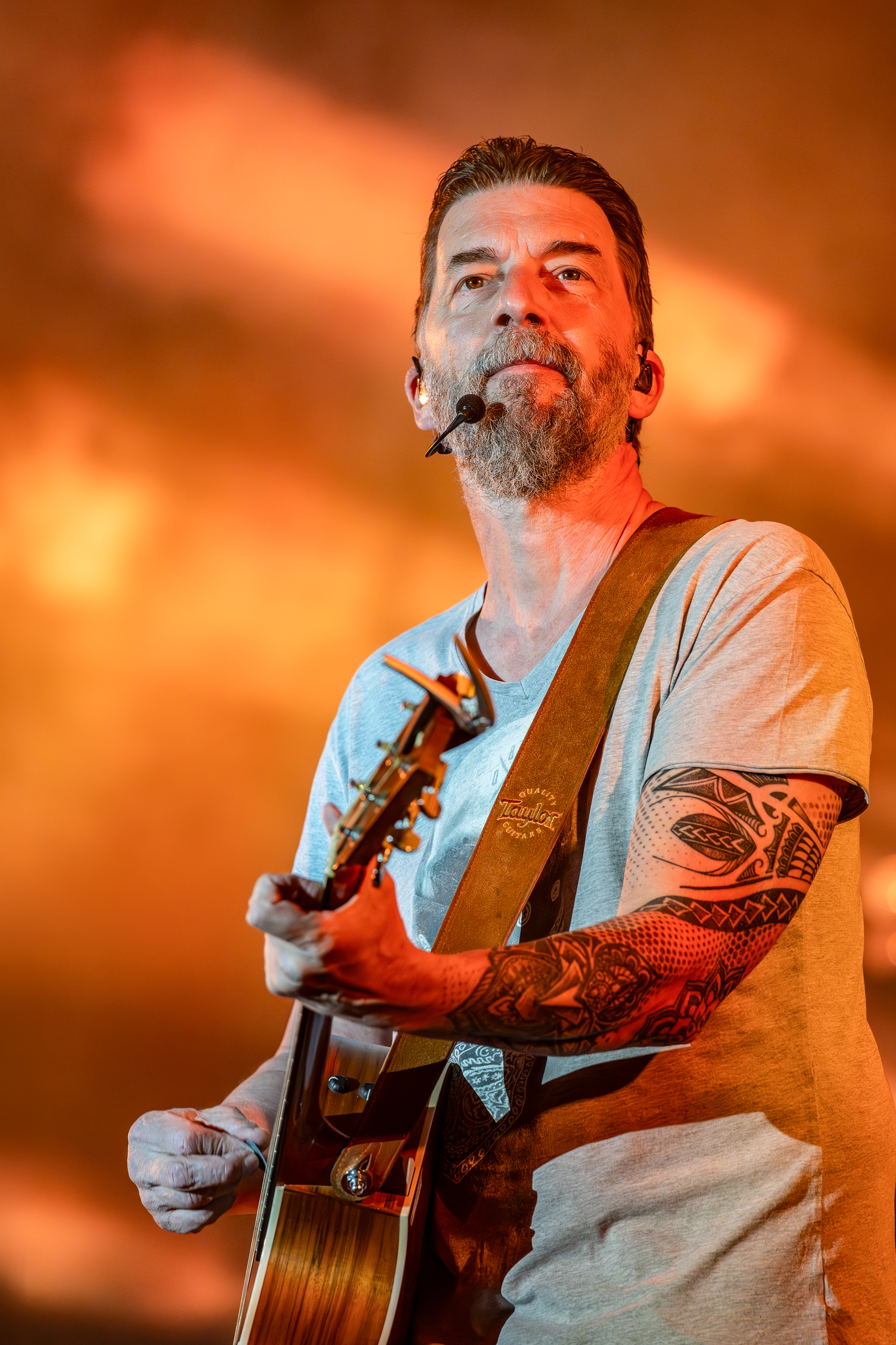
- Kris Wauters during a concert in 2024

Background information
- Born: 21 December 1964 (age 61); Halle, Belgium
- Genre: Pop music
- Occupations: Musician, singer-songwriter, producer
- Instruments: Guitar, piano, vocals
- Member of: Clouseau
- Website: www.clouseau.be

Kris Wauters (born 21 December 1964) is a Flemish artist, active with the band Clouseau combined with his brother Koen Wauters.
