= Koen Wauters =

Belgian singer and TV show host

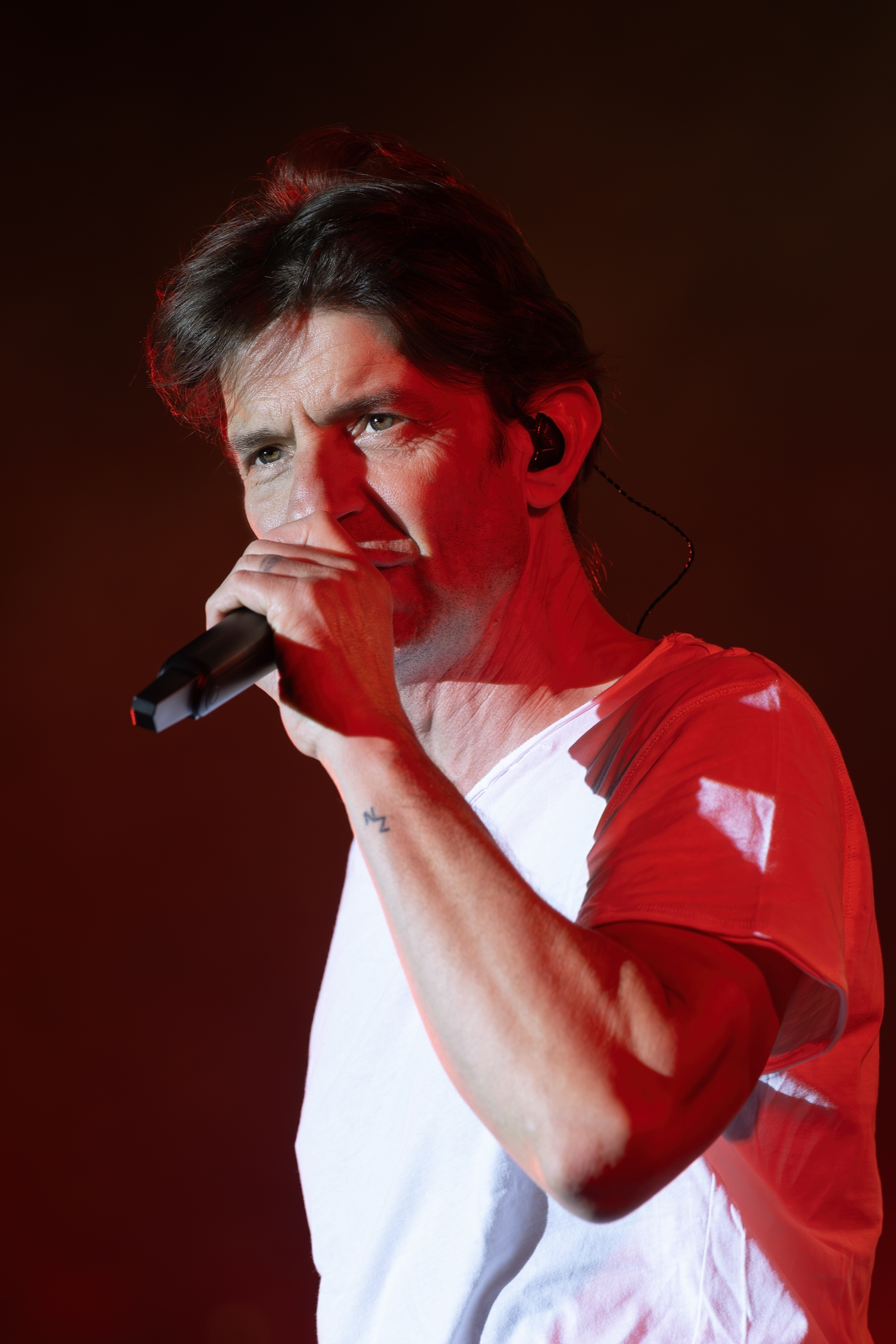
- Koen Wauters during a concert in 2024

Background information
- Born: 17 September 1967 (age 58)
- Origin: Halle, Belgium
- Genres: Pop music
- Occupation: Singer-songwriter
- Instrument: vocals
- Years active: 1987–present
- Member of: Clouseau
- Website: www.clouseau.be

Koen Maria Gaston Wauters (born 17 September 1967) is a Belgian singer, active with the band Clouseau, television presenter, and occasionally actor and race car driver.

== Biography ==
Koen Wauters was born in Halle in 1967. Together with his three brothers and two sisters he spent his youth in Sint-Genesius-Rode. In his youth, Koen Wauters was a keen footballer, but all dreams of a possible pro career ended when he suffered from repeated knee injuries.

== Musical career ==
In 1987, Koen and his brother Kris joined the local band Clouseau. Koen became the frontman and singer of the band. The band and Koen became household names in Flanders in 1989, when the single Anne became a huge hit. Over the next twenty years, Clouseau became the most popular band in Flanders.

== Actor ==
Wauters has acted in two Dutch movies, My Blue Heaven (1990) and Intensive Care (1991).

== Television presenter ==
Wauters started his career as a TV presenter in 1989, as one of the first faces for the new Flemish TV station vtm. He has presented shows like De Super 50 (a hitparade show), Familieraad, Wedden dat?, 1 tegen 100 and Op zoek naar Maria.

Together with his brother Kris Wauters, also a member of Clouseau, he presented all three seasons of the Flemish version of Pop Idol, Idool 2003, Idool 2004 and Idool 2007. He also hosted X Factor (Belgium) in 2005. Since 2011, he has been one of the coach in The Voice van Vlaanderen, and since 2012, he has been presenting Belgium's Got Talent on vtm. In 2025, he presented, with Eva De Roo, the reality talent show, Lift You Up.

== Race car driver ==
The main hobby of Wauters is race car driving. He has competed in the Dakar Rally 11 times, and finished nine times. Together with his brother Kris, he competes in the Belgian GT Championship. His first win in this championship was at the Spa-Francorchamps circuit on 10 May 2009.

It is a little-known fact that Wauters also participated as a co-driver on the Legend Boucles de Spa, both 2010 and 2011. He was co-driver to Marc Duez, another well-known Belgian racing driver for the FSE-team, together with other legendary drivers such as Ari Vatanen, Robert Droogmans and Jacques Castelein.

Wauters made one appearance in the NASCAR Whelen Euro Series in 2018 at the season finale round at Circuit Zolder. He drove for PK Carsport in the No. 24 entry, substituting for Anthony Kumpen who had been suspended earlier in the year by the Royal Automobile Club of Belgium for failing a drug test during the 2018 24 Hours of Zolder.

== Personal life ==
After earlier relations with Babette van Veen and Dagmar Liekens, Wauters met then MTV-presenter Carolyn Lilipaly in June 1998. They married on 22 December 1998, and divorced in 2001.

Wauters married Valerie De Booser on 17 July 2004. They divorced in January 2020. They have two children, daughter Zita and son Nono.

Wauters is also an ambassador for Plan Belgium.

== Motorsports career results ==
=== NASCAR ===
(key) (Bold – Pole position awarded by qualifying time. Italics – Pole position earned by points standings or practice time. * – Most laps led.)

==== Whelen Euro Series – Elite 1 ====
NASCAR Whelen Euro Series – Elite 1 results
Year	Team	No.	Make	1	2	3	4	5	6	7	8	9	10	11	12	NWES	Pts
2018	PK Carsport	24	Chevy	VAL	VAL	FRA	FRA	BRH	BRH	TOU	TOU	HOC	HOC	ZOL; 29	ZOL; 14^	40th	50
