= Jack & Diane =

1982 single by John Mellencamp

Single by John Cougar

from the album American Fool
- B-side: "Can You Take It"
- Released: July 24, 1982
- Studio: Criteria (Miami)
- Genre: Heartland rock; hard rock
- Length: 4:16
- Label: Riva
- Songwriter: John Mellencamp
- Producers: John Mellencamp; Don Gehman

John Cougar singles chronology
"Hurts So Good" (1982)	"Jack & Diane" (1982)	"Hand to Hold Onto" (1982)

Music video
- "Jack & Diane" on YouTube

"Jack & Diane" is a song written and performed by American singer-songwriter John Mellencamp, then performing as "John Cougar". Described by critics as a "love ballad", this song was released as the second single from Mellencamp's 1982 album American Fool, and was chosen by the Recording Industry Association of America (RIAA) as one of the Songs of the Century. It spent four weeks at number one on the Billboard Hot 100 in October 1982 and is Mellencamp's most successful hit single.

== Background and production ==
According to John Mellencamp, "Jack & Diane" was based on the 1962 Tennessee Williams film Sweet Bird of Youth. He said of recording the song: "'Jack & Diane' was a terrible record to make. When I play it on guitar by myself, it sounds great; but I could never get the band to play along with me. That's why the arrangement's so weird. Stopping and starting, it's not very musical." Mellencamp has also stated that the clapping was used only to help keep time and was supposed to be removed in the final mix. However, he left the clapping in once he realized the song would not work without it.

In 2014, Mellencamp revealed that the song was originally about an interracial couple, where Jack was African American and not a football star, but the record company persuaded him to change it.

The song was recorded at Criteria Studios in Miami, Florida, and was produced by Mellencamp and Don Gehman (with Gehman also engineering). Backing Mellencamp were guitarists/backing vocalists Mick Ronson, Mike Wanchic, Larry Crane, drummer Kenny Aronoff, bassist/backing vocalist Robert Frank, and keyboardist Eric Rosser.

In 1982, producer and guitarist Mick Ronson worked with Mellencamp on his American Fool album, and in particular on "Jack & Diane." In a 2008 interview with Classic Rock magazine, Mellencamp recalled:

Mick was very instrumental in helping me arrange that song, as I'd thrown it on the junk heap. Ronson came down and played on three or four tracks and worked on the American Fool record for four or five weeks. All of a sudden, for "Jack & Diane", Mick said, 'Johnny, you should put baby rattles on there.' I thought, 'What the f*ck does put baby rattles on the record mean?' So he put the percussion on there and then he sang the part 'let it rock, let it roll' as a choir-ish-type thing, which had never occurred to me. And that is the part everybody remembers on the song. It was Ronson's idea.

Cash Box said that "this shuffling pop 'ditty'...has a certain power that hits to the heartland with a warm, descriptive storyline that’s both personal and universal." Billboard said that "The hooks here are in the storyline, which traces a blue collar romance 'in the heartland' where Cougar hails from, capped by taut guitar and percussion."

The 1982 music video featured Mellencamp and his then-wife, Victoria Granucci.

=== Samples ===
American singer-songwriter Jessica Simpson sampled this in her song "I Think I'm in Love with You," the third single from her debut studio album Sweet Kisses (1999).

In 2018, country singer Jake Owen sampled this as a tribute song titled "I Was Jack (You Were Diane)", featured on his album Greetings from... Jake.

== Charts ==
=== Weekly charts ===
Chart (1982)	Peak position
Australia (Kent Music Report)	7
Canada Top Singles (RPM)	1
Ireland (IRMA)	7
Netherlands (Dutch Top 40)	31
Netherlands (Single Top 100)	32
South Africa (Springbok Radio)	12
UK Singles (Official Charts)	25
US Billboard Hot 100	1
US Mainstream Rock Airplay (Billboard)	3
US Cash Box Top 100	1

=== Year end charts ===
Chart (1982)	Position
Australia (Kent Music Report)	83
Canada Top Singles (RPM)	19
US Billboard Hot 100	7

== Certifications ==
Region	Certification	Certified units/sales
Canada (Music Canada)	Platinum	100,000^{^}
New Zealand (RMNZ)	4× Platinum	120,000^{‡}
United Kingdom (BPI)	Silver	200,000^{‡}
United States (RIAA)	Gold	1,000,000^{^}
^{^} Shipments figures based on certification alone.^{‡} Sales+streaming figures based on certification alone.

== See also ==
- List of Billboard Hot 100 number-one singles of 1982
