= Hurts So Good =

Single by John Cougar

from the album American Fool
- B-side: "Close Enough"
- Released: April 1982
- Studio: Cherokee (Los Angeles)
- Genre: Pop rock; heartland rock
- Length: 3:39
- Label: Riva
- Songwriters: John Mellencamp; George Green
- Producers: John Mellencamp; Don Gehman

John Cougar singles chronology
"Ain't Even Done with the Night" (1981)	"Hurts So Good" (1982)	"Jack & Diane" (1982)

Music video
- "Hurts So Good" on YouTube

"Hurts So Good" is a song by American singer-songwriter John Mellencamp, who was performing under the stage name "John Cougar" at the time. The song was a number two hit on the US Billboard Hot 100. It was the one of three hit singles from his 1982 studio album, American Fool. The others were "Jack & Diane" and "Hand to Hold on To". The song was a success for Mellencamp, winning the Best Rock Vocal Performance, Male at the 25th Grammy Awards on February 23, 1983, and being one of his most popular.

== Background and recording ==
"Hurts So Good" was written by John Mellencamp and George Green, Mellencamp's childhood friend and occasional writing partner. The song was first conceived, Mellencamp claims, when he had uttered the phrase "hurt so good.” Mellencamp repeated the lines to Green, and they finished the song very quickly. In 2004, Mellencamp expounded on the writing of "Hurts So Good" in an interview with American Songwriter magazine: "George Green and I wrote that together. We exchanged lines back and forth between each other and laughed about it at the time. Then I went and picked up the guitar, and within seconds, I had those chords."

The song was recorded at Cherokee Studios in Los Angeles, California and was engineered by Don Gehman and George Tutko. Backing Mellencamp were Larry Crane and Mike Wanchic (guitars, backing vocals), Kenny Aronoff (drums), George "Chocolate" Perry (bass), and Dave Parman (backing vocals).

== Reception ==
Cash Box said that "steady 4/4 snare work and choppy fuzz tone guitar chords kick off this steel-edged pop/rocker."

== Music video ==
Much of the video was filmed in Medora, Indiana, a small town located approximately 20 mi (30 km) southwest of Seymour, Indiana, where Mellencamp was born and raised.

== Charts ==
The song hit number one on Billboard's Hot Tracks mainstream rock chart. It peaked at number two on the Billboard Hot 100 on August 7, 1982, and, although it failed to make number one, it spent 16 weeks in the top 10, the longest time for any song in the 1980s. It was kept off the top spot by "Eye of the Tiger" by Survivor. In October 1982, "Hurts So Good" was certified gold alongside another Mellencamp song, "Jack & Diane" for each achieving sales exceeding one million units. The song was listed at #83 on Billboard's Greatest Songs of All Time.

The single was also a hit in Canada reaching #3 on RPM magazine's Top 50 Singles chart. It reached number five in Australia and South Africa

=== Weekly charts ===
Chart (1982)	Peak position
Australia (Kent Music Report)	5
Canada RPM Top Singles	3
New Zealand (RIANZ)	39
South Africa (Springbok)	5
US Billboard Hot 100	2
US Cash Box Top 100	1

=== Year-end charts ===
Chart (1982)	Rank
Australia (Kent Music Report)	16
Canada	10
US Billboard Hot 100	8
US Cash Box Top 100	14

=== All-time charts ===
Chart (1958-2018)	Position
US Billboard Hot 100	104

== Certifications ==
Region	Certification	Certified units/sales
Canada (Music Canada)	Platinum	100,000^{^}
New Zealand (RMNZ)	3× Platinum	90,000^{‡}
United States (RIAA)	Gold	1,000,000^{^}
^{^} Shipments figures based on certification alone.^{‡} Sales+streaming figures based on certification alone.

== See also ==
- List of number-one mainstream rock hits (United States)
