= Nothin' Matters and What If It Did =

Nothin' Matters And What If It Did

Studio album by John Cougar
- Released: September 23, 1980
- Genres: Pop, rock
- Length: 35:59
- Label: Riva
- Producer: Steve Cropper

John Cougar chronology
John Cougar (1979)	Nothin' Matters And What If It Did (1980)	American Fool (1982)

Singles from Nothin' Matters and What If It Did
- 1. "This Time" Released: November 8, 1980; 2. "Ain't Even Done with the Night" Released: March 14, 1981

Nothin' Matters and What If It Did is the fourth studio album by singer-songwriter John Mellencamp under his stage name John Cougar. Produced by soul pioneer Steve Cropper, the album includes the Top 40 hits "Ain't Even Done with the Night", which reached No. 17 on the Billboard Hot 100 as the album's second single, and "This Time", which peaked at No. 27 as the album's lead single.

The woman pictured on the album's cover and seen in the music video for "This Time" is actress Edith Massey, a member of the Dreamlanders troupe who often appeared in the films of John Waters. Massey was chosen because, as Mellencamp told Rolling Stone in late 1980, "I was looking for a typical heavy woman to convey a lower-middle-class way of living."

A remastered version of Nothin' Matters and What If It Did was released on Mercury/Island/UMe on March 29, 2005; it includes one bonus track, "Latest Game", which, according to the liner notes, was taken from the sessions for Mellencamp's 1982 album American Fool.

The album is certified Platinum by the RIAA.

== Stories behind the songs ==
Mellencamp wrote "To M.G. (Wherever She May Be)" in remembrance of his high school girlfriend, whose name was Margie (aka M.G.). "I'm not a nostalgic person, so it always surprises me that I'm pretty good at writing nostalgic songs,” Mellencamp said in the liner notes to his 2010 box set On the Rural Route 7609. "It's like there is a nostalgic part of me that I won't admit to myself. But I wrote the song in 1977 in Germany, and it's about my first girlfriend. I had watched a Bette Davis film, and I always thought this girl acted like and in a funny way looked like Bette Davis, even when were kids. I saw her a couple of years ago, and she said that it was one of the happiest moments in her life that I had taken the time to reflect back and write a song about us as adolescents. She was really kind."

"Hot Night in a Cold Town,” the only song on the album that Mellencamp didn’t write, was written by Geoffrey Cushing-Murray and Richard Littlefield. Mellencamp explained in Tim Holmes' 1986 biography how he discovered the song: "Man, I get a lot more demo tapes than you’ve ever seen in your life. On the albums I've got this post office box and people send tapes all the time. I’ve gotten tapes with guys just singing, you know, ‘OOOHHHH’ with no music or nothin’ on it. A lot of 'em are real horrible. But some are good, like that song ‘Hot Night in a Cold Town.’ That’s how I found that one."

In his 1986 biography on Mellencamp, author Martin Torgoff called "Tonight" "a funky, high-stepping ditty about the joyous lubricity a blue-collar worker feels for his woman during the day that could very well have been one of [Mellencamp's] hottest songs had it not been for one X-rated line, involving a part of the female anatomy being applied to the fellow's face, that kept it off the radio." Mellencamp told Torgoff of writing that line, "We'd all been in a bad mood because we were in the studio so long, and everybody was tired of cutting that song, so I threw that line in there to liven things up."

Of the Top 40 hit "This Time", Mellencamp told Torgoff: "The first time I heard it on the radio, I almost puked. I decided never to try to write a formula song like that again."

“ Ain't Even Done with the Night,” the album’s most popular song, was Mellencamp’s attempt to write a soul song. He told Billboard magazine in 2001: “I wanted to write something that was soulful and had an R&B feel to it, and being a young guy I thought we should get Mr. Stax Soul himself (Cropper) to produce the record. That song even has a drum part we lifted straight off an old Motown record.”

According to Holmes, "Cheap Shot" nearly didn't make it onto the album. Mellencamp originally wanted to call it "The Record Company Song" and have it as the first track of the first side. "At first they wanted me to take it off the record, and I said ‘No way!’", Mellencamp said. "Cheap Shot" was ultimately the final song on the album. "Initially it started as a joke", Mellencamp told Torgoff of "Cheap Shot". "I wrote it at home and went into the studio and said to the band, 'How do you think the record company would feel about this song?' They all laughed . . . I didn't mean it to be that serious."

== Critical reception ==
Professional ratings
Review scores
Source	Rating
AllMusic	3/5 stars
(The New) Rolling Stone Album Guide	2/5 stars

Reviews of Nothin' Matters were mixed. Modern Recording and Music rated the performance as "wimpy", and the recording "obtuse": "It seems that Cougar, not unlike the month of March, had started out like a Cougar and now he's gone out like a goat." Many reviewers found the sexual songs tasteless and gratuitous; others liked the bright accessibility of "This Time" and "Ain't Even Done with the Night". Only the Chicago Sun-Times, calling Mellencamp a "poet of the real world", weighed in with a rave review, saying: "Spirit, spark and not a little smartalecky sass—these are the essential ingredients of John Cougar's music . . . This record puts him right up there with those other rock & roll wizards, Costello and Springsteen."

In a three-star review in July 2005, Pittsburgh Post-Gazette critic Ed Masley wrote: "Mellencamp rounded second as a writer on the charmingly titled "Nothin' Matters and What If It Did," although that's not to say he'd necessarily matured if the juvenile sex jokes that make up all 25 seconds of 'Cry Baby' are any indication. But 'Ain't Even Done With the Night' is still as good a song as Cougar and/or Mellencamp has ever written, a soulful pop-rock ballad fueled by youthful innocence and an understated hook that couldn't feel less forced. 'This Time' is almost as solid, and 'Wild Angel' does a decent job of channeling Van Morrison."

== Track listing ==
All tracks are written by John Mellencamp, except where noted.

No.	Title	Writer(s)	Length
1.	"Hot Night in a Cold Town"	Geoffrey Cushing-Murray, Richard Littlefield	3:47
2.	"Ain't Even Done with the Night"		4:38
3.	"Don't Misunderstand Me"		3:33
4.	"This Time"		4:18
5.	"Make Me Feel"		4:04
6.	"To M.G. (Wherever She May Be)"		4:50
7.	"Tonight"		3:17
8.	"Cry Baby"		0:25
9.	"Wild Angel"		3:13
10.	"Peppermint Twist"	Henry Glover, Joey DiNicola	0:28
11.	"Cheap Shot"		3:00

2005 reissue bonus track
No.	Title	Length
12.	"Latest Game"	3:56

== Personnel ==
- John Mellencamp – vocals, guitar
- Doc Rosser – piano
- Mike Wanchic – guitars, backing vocals
- Larry Crane – guitars, backing vocals
- Rick Shlosser – drums
- Ed Greene – drums
- Jeff Baxter – pedal steel guitar
- Dave Woodford – saxophone
- Kenny Aronoff – vibes
- Robert "Ferd" Frank – bass guitar, backing vocals
- John Barlow Jarvis – piano
- Susan Duitch Helmer – backing vocals on "This Time"

== Charts ==
Year	Chart	Position
1981	US Billboard Top LPs & Tape	37
