= Pink Houses =

Single by John Cougar Mellencamp

from the album Uh-huh
- B-side: "Serious Business"
- Released: 23 October 1983
- Recorded: 1983
- Genre: Heartland rock; americana
- Length: 4:43
- Label: Riva
- Songwriter: John Mellencamp
- Producers: John Mellencamp, Don Gehman

John Cougar Mellencamp singles chronology
"Crumblin' Down" (1983)	"Pink Houses" (1983)	"Authority Song" (1984)

Music video
- "Pink Houses" on YouTube

"Pink Houses" is a song written and performed by John Cougar Mellencamp. It was released on 23 October 1983 as the second single from his album Uh-Huh. It reached No. 8 on the US Billboard Hot 100 in early 1984 and No. 15 in Canada. "Pink Houses" was ranked No. 447 on Rolling Stone magazine's list of The 500 Greatest Songs of All Time.

== Origins ==
Recorded in a farmhouse in Brownstown, Indiana, the song was inspired when John Mellencamp was driving along an overpass on the way home to Bloomington, Indiana, from Indianapolis International Airport. Mellencamp observed an old black man sitting outside his small pink shotgun house with his cat in his arms, completely unperturbed by the traffic speeding along the highway in his front yard. "He waved, and I waved back," Mellencamp said in an interview with Rolling Stone. "That's how 'Pink Houses' started."

Mellencamp has stated many times since the release of "Pink Houses" that he is unhappy with the song's final verse. At an October 2014 press conference, he stated: "A long time ago, I wrote a song called 'Pink Houses.' Now when I hear that song, all I can think is: 'Why didn't I do a better job on the last verse?' If I had written it today, the last verse would've had more meaning."

== Charts ==
Chart (1983–1984)	Peak position
Australia (Kent Music Report)	69
Canada Top Singles (RPM)	15
US Billboard Hot 100	8
US Mainstream Rock (Billboard)	3

Year-end chart (1984)	Rank
US Top Pop Singles (Billboard)	86

== Use in politics ==
Mellencamp had intended Pink Houses to be a lesson on race, class and survival in America. The repeating line in the chorus of "Ain’t that America" was meant to be sarcastic and cynical. Ironically, the song came to be used in political advertisements and campaign rallies, especially by conservatives.

In 2004, the song was played at events for Senator John Edwards' presidential campaign. The song was also used at events for Edwards' 2008 presidential campaign.

"Pink Houses" along with "Our Country" was played by Senator John McCain at political events for his 2008 presidential campaign. Mellencamp contacted the McCain campaign pointing out Mellencamp's support for the progressive wing of the Democratic Party and questioning McCain's use of his music; in response, the McCain campaign ceased using Mellencamp's songs.

In January 2009, Mellencamp played "Pink Houses" at We Are One: The Obama Inaugural Celebration at the Lincoln Memorial.

In 2010, "Pink Houses" was used by the National Organization for Marriage (NOM) at events opposing same-sex marriage. At Mellencamp's instruction, his publicist sent a cease and desist letter to NOM stating "that Mr. Mellencamp's views on same sex-marriage and equal rights for people of all sexual orientations are at odds with NOM's stated agenda" and requesting that NOM "find music from a source more in harmony with your views than Mr. Mellencamp in the future."

== Legacy ==
As of September 29, 2025, there's an effort to restore, "Moody's Grocery" which is featured in the official music video from 1:27 to 2:00.

In June 2026, CBS News included the song in its list of the 250 essential American songs of the past 250 years.
