= Whenever We Wanted =

Studio album by John Mellencamp
- Released: October 8, 1991
- Recorded: April–June 1991
- Genre: Rock
- Length: 38:45
- Label: Mercury
- Producer: John Mellencamp

John Mellencamp chronology
Big Daddy (1989)	Whenever We Wanted (1991)	Human Wheels (1993)

Singles from Whenever We Wanted
- 1. "Get a Leg Up" Released: September 1991; 2. "Love And Happiness" Released: November 1991; 3. "Again Tonight" Released: January 1992; 4. "Now More Than Ever" Released: April 1992; 5. "Last Chance" Released: July 1992

Professional ratings
Review scores
Source	Rating
AllMusic	link
Entertainment Weekly	B
Robert Christgau	(choice cut)
Rolling Stone	link

Whenever We Wanted is the eleventh studio album by American singer-songwriter and musician John Mellencamp, and the first of his to be credited simply to Mellencamp's given name (i.e., without "Cougar" in the name).

The album reached the top 20 and went platinum. It includes the hits "Get A Leg Up" (#1 for three weeks on the Album Rock Tracks chart), "Now More Than Ever" (#3 on the Album Rock Tracks chart), "Last Chance" (#12 on the Album Rock Tracks chart), and "Again Tonight" (#1 for two weeks on the Album Rock Tracks chart). "Get A Leg Up" (#14) and "Again Tonight" (#36) also cracked the Billboard Hot 100.

Entertainment Weekly gave the album a positive review, stating: "To Mellencamp's credit, even though 'Whenever We Wanted' delivers his signature rock & roll punch, he doesn't try to. That Mellencamp still has the courage to make depressing assessments in a pop context is a victory that outweighs the record's other shortcomings."

Mellencamp later said the album was an attempt to "write American Fool with better lyrics" after a fan mentioned the previous two albums "had nothing about sex on them." This inspired him to write less about problems in the heartland and "get back to the basics."

== Album notes ==
The woman featured on the cover with Mellencamp is Elaine Irwin. The cover photo was taken during the shoot for the video for the hit single "Get a Leg Up." The video was shot in July 1991; Mellencamp and Irwin did not see each other again until January 1992 when the Whenever We Wanted Tour pulled into New York City. They become a couple a short time later and were married in September 1992. They separated in September 2010 and were divorced in 2011.

After his previous two albums, The Lonesome Jubilee and Big Daddy, featured such non-traditional rock instruments as the accordion and violin, Mellencamp said that on Whenever We Wanted he wanted to put those instruments "back in their cases" and return to a harder-edged sound. Mellencamp further elaborated on the album, saying: "It's very rock 'n' roll. I just wanted to get back to the basics."

== Track listing ==
All songs written by John Mellencamp, except where noted.

1. "Love and Happiness" – 3:53
2. "Now More Than Ever" – 3:43
3. "I Ain't Ever Satisfied" – 3:36
4. "Get a Leg Up" – 3:47
5. "Crazy Ones" (Mellencamp, Randy Handley) – 4:01
6. "Last Chance" – 3:39
7. "They're So Tough" – 4:17
8. "Melting Pot" – 4:47
9. "Whenever We Wanted" – 3:42
10. "Again Tonight" – 3:17

2005 re-issue bonus track

11. "Love and Happiness" (London Club Mix) – 6:33

== Personnel ==
- John Mellencamp – vocals, guitar, hand percussion
- Kenny Aronoff – drums, percussion, vibes
- Mike Wanchic – guitar, background vocals
- Toby Myers – bass guitar, background vocals
- David Grissom – guitars
- John Cascella – Hammond B-3, accordion, penny whistle, Farfisa Organ
- Pharez Whitted – trumpet on "Love And Happiness" and "Whenever We Wanted"
- Jay Healy – engineer, mixing

== Charts ==
=== Weekly charts ===
Weekly chart performance for Whenever We Wanted
Chart (1991)	Peak position
Australian Albums (ARIA)	3
Canada Top Albums/CDs (RPM)	8
German Albums (Offizielle Top 100)	44
New Zealand Albums (RMNZ)	40
Swedish Albums (Sverigetopplistan)	19
Swiss Albums (Schweizer Hitparade)	16
UK Albums (Official Charts)	39
US Billboard 200	17

=== Year-end charts ===
Year-end chart performance for Whenever We Wanted
Chart (1991)	Position
Canada Top Albums/CDs (RPM)	39
Chart (1992)	Position
Canada Top Albums/CDs (RPM)	93
US Billboard 200	91

== Certifications ==
Region	Certification	Certified units/sales
Australia (ARIA)	Platinum	70,000^{^}
United States (RIAA)	Platinum	1,000,000^{^}
^{^} Shipments figures based on certification alone.
