= Code (audio standard) =

Or ΧΟΔΕ, high-fidelity audio disc brand developed by T-Bone Burnett

Code or ΧΟΔΕ (also pronounced "code") is a brand name for the high-fidelity audio DVD-Video disc developed by Grammy Award-winning record producer T Bone Burnett.

== Brand ==
The brand is meant to give listeners a comparable experience to hearing studio master recordings and to offer a higher resolution alternative to the smaller, lower quality MP3, the iTunes Store's Advanced Audio Coding (AAC), and compact disc (CD) formats. A Code disc is a DVD-Video disc with standard 24-bit/96 kHz PCM audio, and is played from a DVD player or a DVD-ROM drive. The disc also includes files in 24-bit/96 kHz WAV, AAC, and MP3 formats for use on personal computers and portable media players. John Mellencamp's Life, Death, Love and Freedom was the first album released in the format on July 15, 2008. Elvis Costello has also expressed interest in releasing in the format. Will Dailey released his Torrent, Volumes 1 & 2 in ΧΟΔΕ on June 9, 2009. The album is credited on its back cover as "ΧΟΔΕ certified by T Bone Burnett".

== See also ==
- DVD-Audio
