= Orpheus Descending (album) =

Studio album by John Mellencamp
- Released: June 16, 2023
- Studio: Belmont Mall, Belmont, Indiana, United States
- Genre: Alternative country; Alternative folk
- Length: 49:02
- Language: English
- Label: Republic
- Producer: John Mellencamp

John Mellencamp chronology
Strictly a One-Eyed Jack (2022)	Orpheus Descending (2023)

Orpheus Descending is the twenty-fifth studio album by American rock singer-songwriter John Mellencamp, released on June 16, 2023 by Republic Records. The album has received positive reviews from critics and explores personal and political themes.

== Reception ==
Professional ratings
Aggregate scores
Source	Rating
Metacritic	84/100
Review scores
Source	Rating
AllMusic	4.0/5 stars
American Songwriter	4.5/5 stars
Louder Sound	3.5/5 stars
Spill Magazine	4/5 stars

According to the review aggregator Metacritic, Orpheus Descending received "universal acclaim" based on a weighted average score of 84 out of 100 from four critic scores. Editors at AllMusic rated this album 4 out of 5 stars, with critic Stephen Thomas Erlewine writing that Lisa Germano's "presence accentuates how Mellencamp is returning to the earthy, rangy roots rock of Big Daddy and that "Mellencamp's blend of sinewy rhythms and burnished acoustics is recognizably his" with a voice that has been "weathered to a nub" and "now sounds eternal, even primal". In American Songwriter, Lee Zimmerman rated this album 4.5 out of 5 stars, calling it "one of [Mellencamp's] most outspoken efforts in recent years but one of his most inspiring as well" for balancing political activism and hope. Writing for Louder Sound, Philip Wilding gave this release 3.5 out of 5 stars, for combining "deft storytelling" in the lyrics with the "elegant weariness" of Mellencamp's vocals. Aaron Badgely of Spill Magazine characterized Orpheus Descending as "a rocking, alternative country/folk album and rated it a 4 out of 5, calling it one of the best albums of Mellencamp's career and stating that Mellencamp's body of work deserves the critical praise of more famous artists such as Bruce Springsteen (who wrote a track on this album).

Editors at Spin named Orpheus Descending one of the best albums of 2023, writing, "John is in his Bob Dylan, cherished-American-treasure moment now, and could coast on that if he wanted. But he doesn’t want to do that. This latest record is a masterpiece, of songwriting, performances, and searing, poetic, and blunt messages. It’s raw and powerful, and musically a return to the Appalachian sound of records like The Lonesome Jubilee and Big Daddy. His voice is deeper and thinner than it was for those records, but the gravelly sound of his singing gives the songs, especially “The Eyes of Portland” and “Hey God,” a perfect weight."

== Track listing ==
All songs written by John Mellencamp, except where noted.

1. "Hey God" – 3:57
2. "The Eyes of Portland" – 4:29
3. "The So-Called Free" – 5:02
4. "The Kindness of Lovers" – 5:33
5. "Amen" – 3:24
6. "Orpheus Descending" – 3:25
7. "Understated Reverence" – 3:36
8. "One More Trick" – 3:54
9. "Lightning and Luck" – 6:35
10. "Perfect World" (Bruce Springsteen) – 3:56
11. "Backbone" – 5:09

== Personnel ==
- John Mellencamp – guitar, vocals, production, art direction, design
- Marianelly Agosto – Spanish narration
- Dane Clark – drums, percussion, backing vocals
- Scott Davis – assistant engineering
- Lisa Germano – violin, backing vocals
- Troye Kinnett – harmonica, keyboards, percussion, backing vocals
- David Leonard – engineering, mixing
- Bob Ludwig – mastering at Gateway Mastering, Portland, Maine, United States
- Speck Mellencamp – cover art
- Joe Spix – art direction, design
- Michael Stucker – technical engineering
- Andrew York – bass guitar, guitar, backing vocals, music direction

== Chart performance ==
Orpheus Descending spent two weeks on the German charts, entering at its peak of 79 on July 7 and appearing again at 94 on July 28.

== See also ==
- 2023 in American music
- List of 2023 albums
