= American Fool =

Studio album by John Cougar
- Released: April 12, 1982
- Studios: Cherokee (Hollywood); Criteria (Miami)
- Genres: Rock; heartland rock
- Length: 34:26
- Label: Riva
- Producers: John Mellencamp; Don Gehman

John Cougar chronology
| Nothin' Matters and What If It Did (1980) | American Fool (1982) | The Kid Inside (1983) |

Singles from American Fool
- 1. "Hurts So Good" Released: April 1982; 2. "Jack & Diane" Released: July 1982; 3. "Hand to Hold Onto" Released: October 1982

Professional ratings
Review scores
| Source | Rating |
|---|---|
| AllMusic | 3.5/5 stars |
| Robert Christgau | B |
| Rolling Stone | 2/5 stars |

American Fool is the fifth studio album by American singer-songwriter John Mellencamp (credited as John Cougar), released on April 12, 1982. The album was his commercial breakthrough, holding the No. 1 position on the Billboard 200 album chart for nine consecutive weeks. A remastered version of American Fool was released on Mercury/Island/UMe on March 29, 2005; it includes one bonus track, the previously unreleased title track.

== Production ==
Producer Don Gehman stated in a 2011 interview that American Fool was fraught with layers of problems. "We had 20 or so songs, we had a record company that was hoping we were making a Neil Diamond‑type album, and after we spent two or three months in the studio recording these songs and mixing them to the best of our ability, I can remember an A&R guy in a pink shirt coming in to listen to them and basically thinking we had nothing. At that point, they put a stop to the project. We had ‘Jack & Diane,’ we had ‘Hand to Hold On To,’ we had ‘Weakest Moments’ — we had some good songs — and while I don’t know the precise nature of the discussions that took place, Riva went from wanting to get a new producer to not even wanting John on the label anymore. Finally, they came around to letting us finish it but wanting to hear the new songs we were going to cut."

According to a 1983 article in the Toledo Blade, the song "Danger List" originated when John Mellencamp heard his guitarist Larry Crane playing some chords in a basement rehearsal room. "I turned on the tape recorder and sang 30 verses,” Mellencamp explained. "I just made them up. Then I went and weeded out the ones I didn't like."

== Track listing ==
All songs written by John Mellencamp, except where noted.

1. "Hurts So Good" (Mellencamp, George M. Green) – 3:42
2. "Jack & Diane" – 4:16
3. "Hand to Hold On To" – 3:25
4. "Danger List" (Mellencamp, Larry Crane) – 4:28
5. "Can You Take It" – 3:35
6. "Thundering Hearts" (Mellencamp, Green) – 3:40
7. "China Girl" (Joe New, Jeff Silbar) – 3:34
8. "Close Enough" – 3:38
9. "Weakest Moments" – 4:07
10. "American Fool" (2005 re-issue bonus track) – 3:46

== Personnel ==
Sources:

- John Mellencamp – lead vocals, guitar, tambourine
- Larry Crane – guitar, background vocals
- Mike Wanchic – guitar, background vocals
- Kenny Aronoff – drums, LinnDrum on "Jack & Diane"
- George "Chocolate" Perry – bass
- Mick Ronson – guitar, background vocals, percussion on "Jack & Diane"
- Robert "Ferd" Frank – bass, background vocals
- Eric Rosser – keyboards
- Dave Parman – background vocals

== Charts ==
=== Weekly charts ===
| Chart (1982) | Peak position |
|---|---|
| Australian (Kent Music Report) | 18 |
| Canada Top Albums/CDs (RPM) | 1 |
| Swedish Albums (Sverigetopplistan) | 30 |
| UK Albums (Official Charts) | 37 |
| US Billboard 200 | 1 |

=== Year-end charts ===
| Chart (1982) | Position |
|---|---|
| Canada Top Albums/CDs (RPM) | 3 |
| US Billboard 200 | 4 |
| Chart (1983) | Position |
| US Billboard 200 | 32 |

== Certifications ==
Certifications for American Fool
| Region | Certification | Certified units/sales |
|---|---|---|
| Canada (Music Canada) | 5× Platinum | 500,000^{^} |
| United States (RIAA) | 5× Platinum | 5,000,000^{^} |
^{^} Shipments figures based on certification alone.
