= Falling from Grace (film) =

1992 film by John Mellencamp

- Theatrical release poster
- Directed by: John Mellencamp
- Written by: Larry McMurtry
- Produced by: Harry Sandler
- Starring: John Mellencamp; Mariel Hemingway; Claude Akins; Dub Taylor; Kay Lenz
- Cinematography: Victor Hammer
- Edited by: Dennis Virkler
- Music by: John Mellencamp
- Production company: Little B Pictures
- Distributed by: Columbia Pictures
- Release date: February 21, 1992 (US)
- Running time: 100 minutes
- Country: United States
- Language: English
- Budget: $3,000,000 (US)
- Box office: $231,826 (US)

Falling from Grace is a 1992 American drama film directed by and starring John Mellencamp, in both his feature film directorial and film acting debut.

== Plot ==
Music superstar Bud Parks, along with his statuesque wife, Alice, and their approximately eight-year-old daughter, Terri Jo, return to his small hometown, fictional Doak City, Indiana, for his paternal grandfather's 80th birthday. Initially, the visit is light-hearted and Bud receives a hero's welcome from many of his relatives and fans. But what is supposed to be a three-day visit of fun quickly turns into much more.

At the birthday party, Bud's high school sweetheart and now sister-in-law, P.J., invites Bud out for a walk, which is met with curious suspicion by Bud's father, Speck. P.J. confesses she has sex with Speck, which is met with shock and disapproval by Bud.

Speck, a successful poultry farmer, is shown early on to be a chauvinistic and dominating womanizer. He fathered an illegitimate son but his wife, Marian, stayed with him. Speck refers to himself as a sire and the women who bore his children as fillies. Over time he is revealed to be dominating, violent, exploitive and shameless, to the point of even making a pass at Bud's wife.

Bud and Alice seem to have a good marriage, and she is clearly devoted. But after learning of P.J.'s affair with Speck, Bud has sex with P.J. as well. P.J. seems to view her sexual encounters as conquests and take pride in simultaneously having three Parks men as lovers. She also seems to view her promiscuity, and the need to keep it secret, as a source of excitement for a housewife and mother who resides in what she considers to be a boring town.

The three days turn into several weeks. Bud's feelings of both love and lust for P.J. are rekindled, and he neglects Alice. Already disillusioned by the music business and thinking about leaving it, he realizes that he's a small-town man at heart and wants to stay in Doak City, where many of his relatives still reside. His anger toward his father also escalates.

California-bred Alice continues to love her husband but quickly becomes tired of small town life and his neglect. She accuses Bud of committing adultery. He doesn't deny it and she leaves with Terri Jo.

Bud tries to get P.J. back as the woman of his life. She reveals that she wanted that many years earlier, but that he wouldn't make a commitment, and it's too late now.

Frustrated and angry, Bud confronts Speck in a restaurant. Speck shows no interest or sympathy in his son's problems but expresses displeasure in having received none of the millions of dollars Bud has made in music. On the basis that he "sired" Bud, Speck claims to be entitled to some of Bud's money. Bud warns Speck to make no further sexual advances at Alice and, in a rage, knocks the food and tableware off the table. As Bud gets up to leave, he is viciously beaten by Speck.

Feeling like he's hit rock bottom, Bud gets drunk and performs a stunt from his wild youth. He lies in a cage in the back of a pickup truck and has one of his friends push the cage onto the road while the truck is moving. He wakes up lying in a hospital bed wearing a brace on his neck and a cast on his right arm. Standing beside his bed are P.J., his sister Sally Cutler and his paternal grandmother.

Alice returns and seems willing to take Bud back if he will be honest with her. Having been rejected by P.J. and humbled by his father and the accident, Bud now realizes what's most important in his life. He and Alice reconcile.

== Cast ==
The starring cast of Falling from Grace includes:

- John Mellencamp as Bud Parks, a prodigal country-music star
- Mariel Hemingway as Alice Parks, Bud's beautiful Californian wife
- Claude Akins as Speck Parks, Bud's father and bully
- Dub Taylor as Grandpa Parks, Speck's "randy" father
- Kay Lenz as P. J. Parks, Bud's sister-in-law, former girlfriend, and secret lover
- Larry Crane as Ramey Parks

== Production ==
Filmed in Mellencamp's hometown of Seymour, Indiana, the 100-minute drama film is the on-screen and directorial debut of rock singer John Mellencamp, with Victor Hammer as director of photography, Dennis Virkler as editor, George Corsillo as production designer, and Harry Sandler as producer.

== Release ==
Falling from Grace premiered in Mellencamp's hometown of Seymour, Indiana at the Jackson Park Cinema on February 18, 1992, and was then released on February 21, 1992, to 22 theaters in the United States. At 96 minutes, the film was released in the United Kingdom on October 1, 1992.

The movie only had a short run in theaters, which Mellencamp blamed on a lack of advertising from Columbia, and American movie audience's "indifference to small-scale movies with complex, introspective themes". Mellencamp thought it was a "good little movie", but "it wasn't a racehorse ... that could come out of the chute real strong and finish real quick, and make millions for the company". Dave Loncao, Mellencamp's co-manager, said that when film critics Siskel and Ebert appeared on The Arsenio Hall Show and gave the movie a thumbs up, that "theater owners began calling Columbia, and if they asked [for the film], Columbia would then give it to them".

== Reception ==
I couldn't say [making the film] was the greatest thing that ever happened to me, but it wasn't one of the worst things. Sometimes I watch the film and I think, It's not too bad. Sometimes I watch it and can't stand to look at it.

— John Mellencamp

In the US, the film earned US$49,708 at the box office on opening weekend, with an overall 45-week return of $231,826. As of October 2023, review aggregator Rotten Tomatoes showed a 78% positive view of the film, based on nine film critics. Upon the home video's release, it debuted on the Billboard video rental chart in October 1992, peaking at number 30, remaining on the chart for 3 weeks.

The New York Times' Janet Maslin was not impressed with Mellencamp's performance nor direction, but complimented the assembled cast and the film's "folksy, collaborative feeling that works well with Mr. McMurtry's rueful ideas about guilt, redemption and the impossibility of recapturing the past." Film critic Peter Travers from Rolling Stone praised the film saying, the movie is as "sexy, comic, sad and precise as a Mellencamp song" and in his directorial debut his "vibrantly funny and touching film plays as an extension of his music without his singing a note". Travers complimented the "fine performances" of Lenz, Hemingway and O'Connell, and overall said Mellencamp made an "admirably unfussy movie that sneaks into your heart with the hypnotic power of a song".

Roger Ebert liked the film as well, saying that Mellencamp has a "real filmmaking gift", and that the film is "perceptive and subtle, and doesn't make the mistake of thinking that because something is real, it makes good fiction". Ebert was also impressed with McCurty's "uncommonly good original screenplay" and the characters he created being "three-dimensional", noting that Lenz "has many of the best scenes".

Billboard Magazine writer Chris Morris wasn't impressed with the film or Mellencamp's acting, stating the film "suffers greatly from Mellencamp's presence in the leading role". Morris criticized his directing as well, arguing that Mellencamp "has problems staging McCurty's talky, high literary script", and that "long, dialog-filled scenes meander along without effect". Morris ends his review by harshly stating the film is a "noble failure", and while the movie is "serious in intent and execution, the film is a sleepy, murky exercise that never engages the emotions".

The Hartford Courant's film critic Malcolm Johnson gave the film a rating of 1.5 out of 4 stars. Johnson says that Mellencamp's debut with his film, is "more than a musician's vanity effort", but it "proves oddly lacking muscle and bite". Johnson criticized Mellencamp's acting as "unmannered, even true, but a little dull". He singles out Lenz's performance though as "charging the film with its most tense and provocative moments".

== Soundtrack ==
The movie's 13-track soundtrack is 49 minutes and 43 seconds long, was recorded at the Belmont Mall Studio, and released in 1991. AllMusic rated the album at 4.5 out of 5 stars. The single "Sweet Suzanne" by the Buzzin' Cousins debuted on the Billboard Country Singles chart in February 1992, and was on the chart for 5 weeks, achieving a peak position of 68.

Don McCleese of Austin American-Statesman said that Larry Crane's performance of "Whiskey Burnin'" makes him "sound too much like a Mellencamp wannabe", but that the other material he wrote "holds its own", especially the pieces sung by Mellencamp. He also called the Buzzin' Cousins a "poor man's" Traveling Wilburys, and that "collaborations [like this] only work if they establish some camaraderie; these performances sound like they were phoned in from various parts of the country".

The Dallas Morning News Michael Corcoran had a different take on the Buzzin' Cousins, opining they are the "heartlands answer to the Traveling Wilburys". He says their single "Sweet Suzanne" basically sounds like a "rollicking Wilburys tune". He also compliments Yoakam's performance of "Common Day Man" as one of his "most passionate vocals yet".

Falling From Grace: The Original Motion Picture Soundtrack
No.	Title	Music	Performer	Length
1.	"Bud's Theme"	Lisa Germano	Lisa Germano	2:22
2.	"Cradle of the Interstate"	Nanci Griffith	Nanci Griffith	3:29
3.	"Whiskey Burnin'"	Larry Crane	Larry Crane	4:48
4.	"Common Day Man"	George Green and John Mellencamp	Dwight Yoakam	3:52
5.	"It Don't Scare Me None"	Larry Crane	John Mellencamp	3:31
6.	"Searchin' for the Perfect Girl"	Bentley Austin, Craig Austin, Eric Austin, and John Mellencamp	Pure Jam	3:13
7.	"All the Best"	John Prine	John Prine	4:02
8.	"Hold Me Like You Used to Do"	Joey Karsten	Qkumbrz	3:06
9.	"Sweet Suzanne"	John Mellencamp	Buzzin' Cousins (Joe Ely, James McMurtry, Mellencamp, Prine, and Yoakam)	4:01
10.	"Nothing's for Free"	Larry Crane	John Mellencamp	3:30
11.	"Little Children"	Lisa Germano	Lisa Germano	4:55
12.	"Days Like These"	Janis Ian	Janis Ian	3:48
13.	"Falling from Grace"	Larry Crane	Larry Rollins	5:06
