= Big Daddy (John Mellencamp album) =

Studio album by John Cougar Mellencamp
- Released: May 9, 1989
- Recorded: September 1988–January 1989
- Studio: Belmont Mall (Belmont, Indiana)
- Genres: Rock; heartland rock; country rock
- Length: 41:43
- Label: Mercury
- Producer: John Mellencamp

John Cougar Mellencamp chronology
The Lonesome Jubilee (1987)	Big Daddy (1989)	Whenever We Wanted (1991)

Professional ratings
Review scores
Source	Rating
AllMusic	3.5/5 stars
Robert Christgau	B−
Hi-Fi News & Record Review	A:1/2
Rolling Stone	4/5 stars

Big Daddy is the tenth studio album by American singer-songwriter John Cougar Mellencamp, released in 1989 by Mercury Records. The album peaked at number seven on the Billboard 200 and contained the singles "Pop Singer" and "Jackie Brown", which peaked at No. 15 and 48, respectively, on the Billboard Hot 100. A re-mastered version of the album was released on May 24, 2005, and contains a bonus acoustic version of "Jackie Brown". Like The Lonesome Jubilee, Big Daddy is folk-inspired as fiddles (among other instruments) are significantly played on a number of tracks. The album's lyrics largely take a serious tone and the album as a whole is regarded by some as Mellencamp's most reflective.

In 1991, Mellencamp said: "Big Daddy was the best record I ever made. Out of my agony came a couple of really beautiful songs. You can't be 22 years old and had two dates and understand that album."

== Lyrical themes ==
Mellencamp continues his pattern of social commentary used on The Lonesome Jubilee on a number of tracks on the album.

"Jackie Brown" addresses the issue of poverty and presents images of the hardships faced by those living in poverty. A lyric in the song's final verse reads "...But who gives a damn about Jackie Brown? Just another lazy man who couldn't take what was his."

"Country Gentleman" is another social commentary addressing Ronald Reagan's presidency and policies. In the song, Mellencamp continually states that it is not Reagan's interest to help the poor, but rather only his "rich friends."

"J.M.'s Question" is a broad social commentary addressing many diverse issues prevalent in the United States including the contamination of the environment and violence stemming from the constitutional right to bear arms among other issues.

"Void in My Heart" is reflective song regarding Mellencamp's position as an acclaimed singer and as one who has worked hard to make it but still he confesses: "There's a void in my heart I can't seem to fill," which is a reference to the turmoil of Mellencamp's personal life at the time, as he was going through a divorce from his second wife Vicki when he was writing songs for this album.

"Big Daddy of Them All" is the account of a parental authority figure whose selfish womanizing ways have led to his downfall, and it is an autobiographical song about Mellencamp himself. The "Big Daddy" name was derived from a character in the old Tennessee Williams play Cat On a Hot Tin Roof—one of Mellencamp's favorite plays/movies.

The single "Pop Singer," which has been widely misinterpreted, refers to living in a disposable pop world where McDonald's has infiltrated every town in America. "I just said 'singer' because that's what the hell I do," Mellencamp said on Rockline in 1989.

The album takes a less serious tone on two tracks, the first of which titled "Martha Say"—an account of a stubbornly independent woman whose ways lead Mellencamp to caution her to "look out."

"Let It All Hang Out" is the second less serious song and is a cover of a 1967 Hombres tune. Mellencamp has said that it is not really a part of the album; it was merely tacked on as a bonus track that was unlisted on the album's original packaging; however, a rarely aired video was filmed for this bonus track.

== Track listing ==
All songs written by John Mellencamp, except where noted.

1. "Big Daddy of Them All" – 3:31
2. "To Live" – 3:18
3. "Martha Say" – 3:41
4. "Theo and Weird Henry" – 4:49
5. "Jackie Brown" – 4:03
6. "Pop Singer" – 2:48
7. "Void in My Heart" – 2:30
8. "Mansions in Heaven" – 3:06
9. "Sometimes a Great Notion" – 3:33
10. "Country Gentleman" – 3:17
11. "J.M.'s Question" – 3:40
12. "Let It All Hang Out" (B.B. Cunningham, McEwen, Master, Hunter) – 3:11
13. "Jackie Brown" (acoustic version) (2005 re-issue bonus track) – 4:24

== Personnel ==
- John Mellencamp – vocals, guitar
- Larry Crane – acoustic guitar, electric guitar, mandolin
- Kenny Aronoff – drums, percussion, background vocals
- Mike Wanchic – electric guitar, bass, dobro, background vocals
- Toby Myers – bass guitar, background vocals
- John Cascella – accordion, keyboards
- Lisa Germano – violin
- Pat Peterson – background vocals
- Crystal Taliefero – background vocals, percussion

== Charts ==
=== Weekly charts ===
Weekly chart performance for Big Daddy
Chart (1989)	Peak position
Australian Albums (ARIA)	1
Canada Top Albums/CDs (RPM)	3
Dutch Albums (Album Top 100)	33
German Albums (Offizielle Top 100)	27
New Zealand Albums (RMNZ)	6
Norwegian Albums (VG-lista)	12
Swedish Albums (Sverigetopplistan)	6
Swiss Albums (Schweizer Hitparade)	11
UK Albums (Official Charts)	25
US Billboard 200	7

=== Year-end charts ===
Year-end chart performance for Big Daddy
Chart (1989)	Position
Canada Top Albums/CDs (RPM)	14
US Billboard 200	58

== Certifications ==
Region	Certification	Certified units/sales
Australia (ARIA)	Platinum	70,000^{^}
Canada (Music Canada)	2× Platinum	200,000^{^}
United States (RIAA)	Platinum	1,000,000^{^}
^{^} Shipments figures based on certification alone.

== Sources ==
- Official Site's Discography
