= Freedom's Road =

Studio album by John Mellencamp
- Released: January 23, 2007
- Recorded: June–October 2006
- Genre: Rock; country rock
- Length: 48:46
- Label: Universal South
- Producer: John Mellencamp

John Mellencamp chronology
| Words & Music: John Mellencamp's Greatest Hits (2004) | Freedom's Road (2007) | Life, Death, Love and Freedom (2008) |

Singles from Freedom's Road
- 1. "Our Country" Released: November 20, 2006

Professional ratings
Aggregate scores
| Source | Rating |
|---|---|
| Metacritic | 65/100 |
Review scores
| Source | Rating |
| AllMusic | 4/5 stars |
| Entertainment Weekly | C+ |
| Los Angeles Times | 3/4 stars |
| Music Box | 3.5/5 stars |
| NeuFutur | (6.2/10) |
| The Phoenix | 3/4 stars |
| PopMatters | 6/10 stars |
| Rolling Stone | 3.5/5 stars |
| Stylus Magazine | C+ |
| Uncut | 2/5 stars |

Freedom's Road is the 19th studio album by American singer-songwriter and musician John Mellencamp, released in 2007. It debuted on the Billboard 200 at No. 5 in late January 2007, becoming the highest debuting album of Mellencamp's career. The song "Our Country" received significant exposure prior to the release of the album, as it was featured in frequently-aired commercials for Chevrolet trucks. The country band Little Big Town provides background vocals on eight songs on the album, including "Our Country."

Mellencamp intended for Freedom's Road to have a 1960s rock sound while still remaining contemporary, and he feels that goal was achieved. "We wanted to make sure that it had the same feeling of some of the great songs from the '60s but also had the message of today and had the backbeat of today. I think we came up with a pretty timeless sounding album," Mellencamp told his online radio station in late 2006.

== Accolades ==
"Our Country" was nominated for Best Solo Rock Vocal Performance at the 50th Annual Grammy Awards (held February 10, 2008).

== Track listing ==
All songs written by John Mellencamp.

1. "Someday" – 3:08
2. "Ghost Towns Along the Highway" – 4:40
3. "The Americans" – 5:11
4. "Forgiveness" – 4:30
5. "Freedom's Road" – 4:19
6. "Jim Crow" – 3:22
7. "Our Country" – 3:47
8. "Rural Route" – 3:08
9. "My Aeroplane" – 4:41
10. "Heaven Is a Lonely Place" – 4:32
11. "Rodeo Clown" [hidden track after several minutes of silence] – 4:25
1. "Ghost Towns Along The Highway" – acoustic (Best Buy exclusive)
2. "Someday" – acoustic (Best Buy exclusive)
3. "Rural Route" – acoustic (Best Buy exclusive)
4. "The Americans" – rough mix (Best Buy exclusive)

John Mellencamp "Our Country"
Sample from John Mellencamp's "Our Country". From the album Freedom's Road.

== Personnel ==
- John Mellencamp – vocals, guitar
- Dane Clark – drums, percussion
- John Gunnell – bass
- Troye Kinnett – keyboards
- Miriam Sturm – violin
- Mike Wanchic – guitars, vocals
- Andy York – guitars, vocals, flute-a-phone
- Joan Baez – vocal duet on "Jim Crow"
- Little Big Town – backing vocals

== Charts ==
| Chart (2007) | Peak position |
|---|---|
| US Billboard 200 | 5 |
