= Strictly a One-Eyed Jack =

Studio album by John Mellencamp
- Released: January 21, 2022
- Studio: Belmont Mall (Belmont)
- Genre: Rock
- Length: 48:37
- Label: Republic
- Producer: John Mellencamp

John Mellencamp chronology
Sad Clowns & Hillbillies (2017)	Strictly a One-Eyed Jack (2022)	Orpheus Descending (2023)

Singles from Strictly a One-Eyed Jack
- 1. "Wasted Days" Released: September 29, 2021; 2. "Chasing Rainbows" Released: December 10, 2021; 3. "Did You Say Such a Thing" Released: January 21, 2022

Professional ratings
Review scores
Source	Rating
AllMusic	3.5/5 stars
The Daily Telegraph	3/5 stars
Pitchfork	6.0/10
PopMatters	8/10
Rolling Stone	3.5/5 stars
Stereoboard	5/5 stars
Aftonbladet	4/5 stars
Stereophile	4/4 stars

Strictly a One-Eyed Jack is the 24th studio album by American singer-songwriter John Mellencamp. The album was released on January 21, 2022, by Republic Records. The album's cover, a portrait of Mellencamp, was painted by Mellencamp's son Speck, who graduated from the Rhode Island School of Design and is currently, as of 2024; the executive director of Southern Indiana Center for the Arts in Seymour, Indiana.

== Background and production ==
Mellencamp stated that he began working on Strictly a One-Eyed Jack shortly before the COVID-19 pandemic began, and he also told iHeart Radio that most of its songs were written before the pandemic. Recording sessions stopped in March 2020 when the pandemic first began and did not resume for a full year, until March 2021. In April 2021, Mellencamp invited Bruce Springsteen to his Belmont Mall recording studio in Belmont, Indiana to play guitar and sing on a few tracks. The pair recorded one full-fledged duet, "Wasted Days", which became the album's lead single when it was released on September 29, 2021. Springsteen also contributed guitar and background vocals to the album's third single, "Did You Say Such a Thing", and guitar (but no vocals) to "A Life Full of Rain", the record's closing track.

Mellencamp said he approached the album as if all the songs were coming from the voice of a single character. "I realized after a couple, three songs, it was the same voice," he told Forbes. "It sounds silly, and I'm sure you've heard it a thousand times, but it was the same messenger delivering these songs to me. And I realized that this is one guy's story. And I felt that it was important to make sure that this guy was represented properly."

== Songs ==
"I Always Lie to Strangers," which Mellencamp teased a one-minute snippet of on his website on February 3, 2021, is a slow piano ballad that Mellencamp was inspired to write after finding out that the average person hears several hundred lies a day, and tells about 150 of their own. He told the Associated Press: "You're watching television, you're watching false advertising. You're watching the news—I don't care which side of the rope you swing on — you're hearing lies. If you go to church, you hear lies."

He expounded further to Forbes: "The first song on the record is a song called 'I Always Lie To Strangers.' And I thought, 'Well, I don't really do that, but I guess maybe I do. And I guess maybe everybody does.' And then I did a little research. The average person hears 300 or 400 lies a day and will tell 150 himself and not even know it. 'Cause you turn the news on, you get lies. You turn advertising on, you get lies. You talk to people, they lie to you. Even as simple as, 'How are you doing today?' 'I'm doing great.' No, they're not, but they say it anyway. So it was just that simple of the thought that led to that song."

"Driving in the Rain," a euphemism Mellencamp's grandfather used to warn a young Mellencamp when he was living dangerously, was inspired by the COVID-19 pandemic. “That’s an old term,” Mellencamp told the Washington Post of "Driving in the Rain". "My grandfather used to tell me, 'John, you better be careful or you'll be driving in the rain soon,' which means you're getting into dangerous territory." Rolling Stone magazine wrote: "On the most movingly lovely song, 'Driving in the Rain,' fiddles drone gorgeously over a gentle country lope as Mellencamp amiably growls 'And the days scurry by so fast/I finally see myself and laugh, noticing the change,' a little like Louis Armstrong fronting Son Volt."

"Sweet Honey Brown" is a song about a life wasted by heroin. Although on the surface it may seem that "Sweet Honey Brown" is a love song to a woman, the "sweet honey brown" referred to in the song is, in fact, heroin.

"Gone So Soon" has a late-night jazz club arrangement and is about a relationship ending. The song features a trumpet solo from Joey Tartell, a Professor of Trumpet and the Director of Undergraduate Studies at Indiana University's Jacobs School of Music. It is the first time a trumpet has been heard on a Mellencamp recording since 1991's "Love and Happiness".

Lead single "Wasted Days," Mellencamp's first ever duet with Bruce Springsteen, is sung from the point of view of an aging man who knows his days are numbered, but who tries to make the most of each day he has left. This is reflected in the song's opening lyric: "How many summers still remain?" Stated Mellencamp guitarist Andy York: “Not many people would sing a song starting with that line. But I think it’s important. It’s important to be sung because, ultimately, your takeaway from that song is you need to squeeze every bit of happiness and life out of every day and not waste days.” Mellencamp told Jim Kerr of iHeart Radio: "'Wasted Days' is a very simple song with a very simple message. I think it is so simple that a lot of people will be able to feel it, especially when Bruce sings."

The album's second single, "Chasing Rainbows", which features Mellencamp harmonizing on the chorus with guest musician Merritt Lear (who played violin on Mellencamp's Good Samaritan Tour in 2000), offers the message that money does not lead to happiness and advises people to recognize their blessings.

== Track listing ==
All tracks are written by John Mellencamp.

Strictly a One-Eyed Jack track listing
No.	Title	Length
1.	"I Always Lie to Strangers"	3:36
2.	"Driving In the Rain"	3:25
3.	"I Am a Man That Worries"	4:33
4.	"Streets of Galilee"	2:49
5.	"Sweet Honey Brown"	5:18
6.	"Did You Say Such a Thing" (featuring Bruce Springsteen)	3:39
7.	"Gone So Soon"	3:31
8.	"Wasted Days" (featuring Bruce Springsteen)	4:31
9.	"Simply a One-Eyed Jack"	4:41
10.	"Chasing Rainbows"	3:27
11.	"Lie to Me"	3:30
12.	"A Life Full of Rain" (featuring Bruce Springsteen)	5:27
Total length:		48:37

== Personnel ==
Musicians

- Andy York – acoustic guitar, electric guitar, autoharp, banjo, bass, backing vocals, musical direction
- Dane Clark – drums, percussion
- Joey Tartell – trumpet
- John Gunnell – bass
- John Mellencamp – vocals, acoustic guitar
- Merritt Lear – violin, backing vocals
- Mike Wanchic – electric guitar, backing vocals
- Miriam Sturm – violin
- Troye Kinnett – piano, accordion, organ, harmonica
- Bruce Springsteen – electric guitar, vocals

Technical

- John Mellencamp – production
- Bob Ludwig – mastering
- David Leonard – mixing, recording
- Michael Stucker – technical engineering
- Scott Davis – engineering assistance

Visuals

- John Mellencamp – art direction, design
- Joe Spix – art direction, design
- Speck Mellencamp – cover painting

== Charts ==
Chart performance for Strictly a One-Eyed Jack
Chart (2022)	Peak position
Austrian Albums (Ö3 Austria)	52
Belgian Albums (Ultratop Flanders)	89
Belgian Albums (Ultratop Wallonia)	163
German Albums (Offizielle Top 100)	24
Scottish Albums (Official Charts)	16
Swiss Albums (Schweizer Hitparade)	6
US Billboard 200	196
US Americana/Folk Albums (Billboard)	5
US Top Rock Albums (Billboard)	30
