= Life Death Love and Freedom =

Studio album by John Mellencamp
- Released: July 15, 2008
- Recorded: August 13, 2007–2008 Belmont Mall
- Genres: Americana; folk rock; roots rock; alternative country; country rock; blues rock; heartland rock
- Length: 49:40
- Label: Hear Music
- Producer: T Bone Burnett

John Mellencamp chronology
Freedom's Road (2007)	Life Death Love and Freedom (2008)	Life Death Live and Freedom (2009)

Professional ratings
Aggregate scores
Source	Rating
Metacritic	75/100
Review scores
Source	Rating
AllMusic	3.5/5 stars
The A.V. Club	C+
Entertainment Weekly	B
The Observer	3/5 stars
Paste	(8/10)
The Phoenix	3/4 stars
PopMatters	8/10 stars
Rolling Stone	4/5 stars
Slant Magazine	3/5 stars
Uncut	4/5 stars

Life Death Love and Freedom is the 20th folk rock album by singer-songwriter John Mellencamp and produced by T Bone Burnett. It was released on July 15, 2008. At the end of 2008, Rolling Stone magazine named Life Death Love and Freedom No. 5 on its list of the 50 best albums of the year. The song "Troubled Land" was number 48 on Rolling Stone's list of the 100 Best Singles of 2008. Antimusic.com named it number 18 on their top albums of the decade list. The album was named No. 38 in Q's 50 Best Albums of the Year 2008.

Mellencamp has characterized the album as a collection of "modern electric folk songs." The album's first single was "My Sweet Love," and it was serviced to radio on June 10, 2008.

In the liner notes to his 2010 box set On the Rural Route 7609, Mellencamp said of Life Death Love and Freedom: "I would put that album, that collection of songs, up against any record ever made. In my mind that record is as good as just about any record ever made. That's a good feeling, to be able to finally say, 'hey, after nearly two dozen albums, I finally made a record that I think is as good as anything out there.'"

== Release ==
Life Death Love and Freedom was the first album release to use the ΧΟΔΕ (CODE) process. T Bone Burnett worked with engineers to develop CODE, a proprietary audio technology that creates high-definition audio files. The CODE version of "Life Death Love and Freedom" is on a DVD that was packaged along with the standard CD version of the album.

== Track listing ==
All songs written by John Mellencamp.

No.	Title	Length
1.	"Longest Days"	3:11
2.	"My Sweet Love"	3:27
3.	"If I Die Sudden"	3:45
4.	"Troubled Land"	3:23
5.	"Young Without Lovers"	2:49
6.	"John Cockers"	3:51
7.	"Don't Need This Body"	3:26
8.	"A Ride Back Home" (feat. Karen Fairchild of Little Big Town)	3:12
9.	"Without a Shot"	3:40
10.	"Jena"	3:41
11.	"Mean"	2:34
12.	"County Fair"	3:41
13.	"For the Children"	4:36
14.	"A Brand New Song"	3:58

== Charts ==
Chart (2008)	Peak position
Australian Albums (ARIA)	21
