= The Kid Inside =

Studio album by John Cougar
- Released: January 27, 1983
- Recorded: 1977
- Studio: The Hit Factory (New York City)
- Genre: Rock
- Label: MainMan Records
- Producer: John Cougar

John Cougar chronology
| American Fool (1982) | The Kid Inside (1983) | Uh-Huh (1983) |

Professional ratings
Review scores
| Source | Rating |
|---|---|
| AllMusic | 1/5 stars |
| Classic Rock | 5/10 stars |
| The Rolling Stone Album Guide | 2.5/5 stars |

The Kid Inside is the sixth studio album by American singer-songwriter John Mellencamp (credited as John Cougar). It was released January 27, 1983 by MainMan Records. It was recorded in 1977 for MCA Records and was intended to be the follow-up to his debut album Chestnut Street Incident, but MCA declined to release the album and dropped Mellencamp from the label. The recordings remained unreleased until 1983 when Tony Defries, Mellencamp's former manager, released the album on his own MainMan label. Defries was attempting to capitalize on the recent success of Mellencamp's breakout album American Fool, which was one of the best-selling albums of 1982 and spawned two top 5 singles on the Billboard Hot 100.

Defries' decision to release The Kid Inside in early 1983 confused many fans and even some journalists who thought it was the follow-up to American Fool, when it was really already six years old. The true follow-up to American Fool was Uh-Huh, and it was released in October 1983. The Kid Inside was Mellencamp's last album to be released under the name John Cougar. His next release, Uh-Huh, would be released under the name John Cougar Mellencamp.

The 2009 Cherry Red Records reissue added four bonus tracks recorded during the sessions for the album.

== Track listing ==
All songs written by John Mellencamp; except where noted.

1. "Kid Inside" – 5:32
2. "Take What You Want" – 3:14
3. "Cheap Shot" – 3:53
4. "Sidewalk and Streetlights" – 4:08
5. "R. Gang" – 2:30
6. "American Son" – 4:52
7. "Gearhead" – 2:38
8. "Young Genocides" – 2:26
9. "Too Young to Live" – 7:45
10. "Survive" – 4:09

=== 1998 CD bonus tracks ===
1. "The Whore" – 1:21
2. "The Man Who Sold the World" (David Bowie) – 2:27

=== 2009 CD bonus tracks ===
1. "Skin It Back" – 4:08
2. "Last of the Big Time Spenders" – 6:34
3. "Whore" – 4:00
4. "Skin It Back (Acoustic)" – 5:20

== Personnel ==
- John Cougar – vocals, acoustic guitar, percussion, electric Telecaster guitar, arrangements
- David Parman – bass, acoustic guitar, electric Stratocaster guitar, violin, percussion, arrangements
- Larry Crane – electric guitar, 6- and 12-string guitar
- Terrance Sala – drums, percussion
- Tom Wince – keyboards
- Wayne Hall – saxophone, flute, percussion

Technical

- Ed Sprigg – engineer
- James J.C. Andrews – art direction, cover photography
