= Chestnut Street Incident =

Studio album by Johnny Cougar
- Released: October 1, 1976
- Recorded: 1975
- Studio: Gilfoy Sound Studio, Bloomington, Indiana, The Hit Factory, New York City
- Genre: Heartland rock
- Length: 33:42
- Label: MCA
- Producer: Tony Defries, James J. C. Andrews

Johnny Cougar chronology
Chestnut Street Incident (1976)	A Biography (1978)

Professional ratings
Review scores
Source	Rating
AllMusic	1/5 stars
Classic Rock	5/10 stars
Rolling Stone	0/5 stars
The Rolling Stone Album Guide	2/5 stars

Chestnut Street Incident is the debut studio album by the American singer-songwriter John Mellencamp, and his first of six albums in which Mellencamp was credited as Johnny (later John) Cougar. It was released by MCA Records on October 1, 1976.

Signing on with David Bowie's manager, Tony Defries, Mellencamp travelled to New York City to cut this first album. DeFries would also go on to produce the album as well. With the thinking that a name like "Mellencamp" wouldn't generate a lot of interest, DeFries changed Mellencamp's name to "Johnny Cougar." Mellencamp would later go on to say that he had no idea about the name change until he saw the final product and that nobody had ever called him "Johnny" before. It would take Mellencamp 15 years to have his full real name on an album, Whenever We Wanted, in 1991.

Five of the tracks are covers from the '50s and '60s, and six are original songs by Mellencamp. The 1998 Original Masters rerelease added two bonus songs that were also covers. The album sold 12,000 copies when it was originally released, which would lead to MCA's refusal to release his next album, The Kid Inside, and drop Mellencamp.

The 2009 CD reissue by Cherry Red Records added six bonus tracks recorded during the original album sessions.

== Track listing ==
All tracks composed by Johnny Cougar (a.k.a. John Mellencamp); except where indicated

1. "American Dream" – 2:21
2. "Oh, Pretty Woman" (Bill Dees, Roy Orbison) – 2:54
3. "Jailhouse Rock" (Jerry Leiber and Mike Stoller) – 2:11
4. "Dream Killing Town" (Cougar, George M. Green) – 3:20
5. "Supergirl" (Aldo Legui, Bob Marcus) – 2:37
6. "Chestnut Street" – 3:18
7. "Good Girls" – 3:09
8. "Do You Believe in Magic?" (John Sebastian) – 2:38
9. "Twentieth Century Fox" (John Densmore, Robby Krieger, Ray Manzarek, Jim Morrison) – 2:14
10. "Chestnut Street Revisited" – 5:22
11. "Sad Lady" (Cougar, George M. Green) – 3:26

=== 1998 CD bonus tracks ===
1. "Hit the Road Jack" (Percy Mayfield) – 2:32
2. "I Need Somebody Baby" (Iggy Pop, James Williamson) – 3:43

=== 2009 CD bonus tracks ===
1. "Man Who Sold the World" (David Bowie) – 2:28
2. "Little Heroes" – 2:47
3. "Hit the Road Jack" (Percy Mayfield) – 2:32
4. "Kicks" (Barry Mann, Cynthia Weil) – 2:35
5. "Need Somebody Baby" (Iggy Pop, James Williamson) – 3:43
6. "When I Was Young" – 2:38

== Personnel ==
- John Mellencamp – lead and backing vocals
- Mike Boyer, Richard Kelly, Mick Ronson, Mike Wanchic – guitars
- David Mansfield – steel guitar, mandolin, violin
- Michael Kamen – keyboards
- Tom Wince – keyboards, chimes
- Kirk Butler – synthesizer, percussion, engineer
- David Parman – bass, guitar, backing vocals
- Wayne Hall – saxophone
- Bill Bergman, Jerome Deupree, Hilly Michaels – drums

Technical personnel

- Tony Defries – producer
- James J. C. Andrews – co-producer
- Bruce Tergesen – engineer
