= Larry Crane (guitarist) =

American songwriter and guitarist (born 1956)

- Born: October 8, 1956 (age 69); Seymour, Indiana

Larry Crane (born October 8, 1956) is an American rock musician and songwriter from Seymour, Indiana. From 1976 until 1991, he appeared alongside John Mellencamp as guitarist and contributor to the arrangements and production of the Mellencamp sound (often labelled as "heartland rock.")

== History ==
As Mellencamp's guitarist, Crane contributed to twenty Billboard charted singles, including "Ain't Even Done with the Night", "Hurts So Good", "Jack and Diane", "Hand to Hold on To", "I Need a Lover", "Crumblin' Down", "Pink Houses", "Rain on the Scarecrow", "Small Town", "Lonely Ol' Night", "Rumbleseat", "R.O.C.K in the U.S.A.", "Paper in Fire", "Check It Out", "Cherry Bomb", "Martha Say", "Jackie Brown", and "Pop Singer". Though not often recognized as a songwriter, Crane did receive a co-writer credit for "Play Guitar" on the Uh-Huh album.

After the release of Big Daddy, Crane left the Mellencamp band due to his impression that "he and his bandmates were underpaid." Since leaving the band, Crane has launched a solo career. During his 30-plus year career, he has also toured and recorded with several other influential musicians, including John Prine, Steve Earle, Bonnie Raitt, Rosanne Cash, Carl Perkins, James McMurtry, Mitch Ryder, Lou Reed and John Fogerty. He has also collaborated with producer Bob Johnston. Larry announced his retirement from music on Oct 8, 2017 on Facebook.

== Discography ==
=== Solo recordings ===
Year	Title
1993	Eye for an Eye
1994	Larry Crane
2003	Wire & Wood
2010	Tropical Depression

=== Recordings with John Mellencamp ===
Year	Title	Credits
1976	Chestnut Street Incident	Lead guitar, back up vocals
1977 (released in 1983)	The Kid Inside	Lead guitar, back up vocals
1978	A Biography	Guitar, background vocals
1979	John Cougar	Guitar, background vocals
1980	Nothin' Matters and What If It Did	Guitar, backing vocals
1982	American Fool	Guitar
1983	Uh-Huh	Guitar
1985	Scarecrow	Electric guitar, acoustic guitar, backing vocals
1987	The Lonesome Jubilee	Guitar, mandolin, harmonica, autoharp, banjo, backing vocals
1989	Big Daddy	Acoustic guitar, electric guitar, mandolin

=== Other recordings ===
Year	Artist	Titles	Credits
1983	Mitch Ryder	Never Kick a Sleeping Dog	Vocals, guitar
1985	Rosanne Cash	Rhythm & Romance	Guitar
1987	Rosanne Cash	King's Record Shop	Guitar
1988	Various Artists	Folkways: A Vision Shared	Guitar
1989	James McMurtry	Too Long in the Wasteland	Vocals (background), guitar
1991	Various Artists	Falling from Grace	Composer, vocals, performer, producer, guitar
1995	Rosanne Cash	Retrospective	Guitar
1996	Carl Perkins	Go Cat Go	Guitar
1996	Dave Sharp	Downtown America	Arrangement, guitar
1997	John Prine	Live on Tour	Vocals (background), guitar
2002	Keith Sykes	Don't Count Us Out	Additional guitar

- Time to Pay (film)
- Falling from Grace, 1992
