= Eric Franklin Rosser =

American former fugitive and keyboardist

Eric Rosser

FBI Ten Most Wanted Fugitive

Description
- Born: Eric Franklin Rosser; January 17, 1952 (age 74); Syracuse, New York
- Nationality: American
- Gender: Male

Status
- Added: December 27, 2000
- Caught: August 21, 2001
- Number: 460
- Captured

Eric Franklin Rosser (born January 17, 1952) also known as Doc Rosser, is an American former musician known as a keyboardist for singer John Mellencamp, and a convicted sex offender. He joined Mellencamp's band in 1979, when the singer was known as Johnny Cougar. He toured for two years and appeared on two albums, Nothin' Matters and What If It Did (1980) and American Fool (1982), before leaving the band.

Rosser is infamous for being on the Federal Bureau of Investigation's "Ten Most Wanted Fugitives" list for his involvement in the production and distribution of child pornography in 2000. He had been living in Bangkok at the time and had been on the run due to a failure to appear. He was arrested in August 2001 for carrying false information, and was extradited back to the United States.

== Background ==
Rosser was born in Syracuse, New York to Donna, a watercolor artist, and Richard Rosser, a retired Air Force Colonel and retired DePauw University president. He attended Air Academy High School in Colorado, and graduated from London Central High School, a USAF-run school located in Bushy, UK in 1970. Rosser got his bachelor's degree in music from Oberlin in 1974, and a master's degree from Indiana University in 1979. Rosser lived in Bloomington, Indiana until the early 1990s, when he moved to Thailand and began giving piano lessons to students who would become among his victims. Between August 1995 and August 1997, Rosser frequently visited Bloomington from Thailand, and during these visits Rosser victimized three American girls, aged 9 to 11 years old.

== Conviction ==
In April 2000, Rosser was indicted by a federal grand jury in Indianapolis and fled to Thailand. On December 27, 2000, he was added to the FBI Ten Most Wanted Fugitives list, replacing Arthur Lee Washington. On August 21, 2001, Rosser was captured in Bangkok. He was sentenced to over 16 years after an investigation revealed he had recorded himself sexually assaulting a young girl, and then traded it to an Indiana man for different pornographic material. As of 2012, Rosser was incarcerated at FCI Butner Low. He was released on January 13, 2017.

== Release and new charges ==
In July 2017, according to court documents filed by federal prosecutors, Rosser was riding on a bus from Butte to Billings in July 2017 when another man noticed child pornography on his laptop screen. When the man approached Rosser about it, he reportedly said, "Leave me alone. I know I have a problem", according to court documents.

The fellow passenger called Billings police to the bus station, and when they arrived, Rosser admitted to looking at the images of young girls engaging in sexually explicit conduct. Police also found he had $10,000 in cash strapped to each leg, along with $50,000 in cash in his luggage and approximately $1,000 worth of marijuana, which he told police he purchased for personal use, according to court records.

Rosser additionally admitted to violating his probation conditions and fleeing federal supervision in Washington state, court documents say. He said he had emptied his bank account and fled to avoid going back to prison.

Rosser pleaded guilty to accessing the internet with intent to view child pornography after signing a plea agreement with prosecutors in October 2018.

Rosser told U.S. Magistrate Judge Jeremiah Lynch he did not dispute any of the information brought forth by federal prosecutors. Lynch said he would be sentenced to a minimum of 10 years and may be on supervised release for the rest of his life following the prison term.

His sentencing was set for January 17, 2019. On February 22, 2019, Rosser was sentenced to ten years in prison, and to permanent supervision if he is ever released. He is now incarcerated at FCI Englewood in Colorado with BOP Number 07006-028.
