= Riva Records =

British record label; imprint of Riva Records Ltd.

Riva Records was a British record label founded in the UK in 1975 by Billy Gaff, manager of Rod Stewart.

Rod Stewart signed to the label in the UK, but stayed with Warner Bros. Records in the US and the rest of the world. Another well-known artist on the label was John Cougar Mellencamp, distributed by PolyGram in the US, and WEA in most other countries. After Stewart and Mellencamp left the label, it stopped operating. Billy died in Dublin on 25 April 2022.

Stewart left in 1982 (last issue "How Long"), whereas Mellencamp stayed a little later. A variety of acts then had singles released on Riva in the UK (see below); the last known UK release was RIVA 51 (Glory with "Hearts Will Sing" / "As It Is") in 1987. Other acts to have releases on Riva included: Lewis Sisters / Lewis, Blinding Tears, Phil Thornalley, Carmine Appice, and The Lookalikes with Sean O'Connor.

== Discography ==
List of 7" issues on Riva Records in the UK [please fill in the blanks]
Riva No	Date	Artist	Tracks
1	November 1975 (No PS)	Rod Stewart	This Old Heart of Mine / All in the Name of Rock 'n' Roll
2	April 1976 (No PS)	The Atlantic Crossing Drum & Fife +	Skye Boat Song / Skye Boat Song (instr.)
3	May 1976 (No PS)	Rod Stewart	Tonight's the Night / The Ball Trap
4	August 1976 (No PS)	Rod Stewart	The Killing of Georgie Parts 1 & 2 / Fool For You
5	? (No PS)	Frankie Laine / Lou Reizner & Will Malone	Maxwell's Silver Hammer / You Never Give Me Your Money
6	December 1976 (No PS)	Rod Stewart	Get Back / Trade Winds
7	April 1977 (No PS)	Rod Stewart	The First Cut Is the Deepest / I Don't Want to Talk About It
8	1977	Faces	Memphis (4 track) / stay with me +3
9	June 1977	Rod Stewart	Sailing / Stone Cold Sober
10	January 1978 (No PS)	Rod Stewart	Hot Legs / I Was Only Joking
11	October 1977 (No PS)	Rod Stewart	You're in My Heart / You Really Got A Nerve
12	1977 (No PS)	Window	Bandit / Rose and Thorn
13	?	?	?
14	February 1978	Johnny Cougar	I Need A Lover / Born Reckless
15	May 1978	Rod Stewart	Ole Ola (Mulhera Brasileira)
16	May 1978	Johnny Cougar	Factory / Alley of the Angels
17	November 1978 (No PS)	Rod Stewart	Da Ya Think I'm Sexy? / Dirty Weekend
18	January 1979 (No PS)	Rod Stewart	Ain't Love A Bitch / Scared and Scarred
19	April 1979 (No PS)	Rod Stewart	Blondes (Have More Fun) / The Best Days of My Life
20	June 1979	John Cougar	Miami / Do You Think That's Fair
21	September 1979	John Cougar	Taxi Dancer / Small Paradise
22	1980	The Lookalikes	Can I Take You Home Tonight / Radio / Don`T Cry For Me
23	May 1980	Rod Stewart	If Loving You Is Wrong (I Don't Want To Be Right) / Last Summer
24	1980	The Lookalikes	Call Me If You Really Want Me / Just What You Got
25	1980	Johnny Cougar	This Time / Don't Misunderstand Me
26	October 1980 (No PS???)	Rod Stewart	Passion / Better Off Dead
27	1981	The Lookalikes	Baby Don`T Leave / Why Didn`T I Think of That
28	December 1980	Rod Stewart	My Girl / Dance With Me
29	March 1981	Rod Stewart	Oh God I Wish I Was Home Tonight / Somebody Special
30	February 1981	John Cougar	Hot Night in a Cold Town / Tonight
31	May 1981	John Cougar	Ain’t Even Done with the Night / To M.G. Wherever She May Be
32	1981	Carmine Appice and the Rockers	Be My Baby / Leave It Up To You
33	October 1981	Rod Stewart	Tonight I'm Yours (Don't Hurt Me) / Sonny
34	December 1981	Rod Stewart	Young Turks / Tora Tora Tora (Out with the Boys)
35	February 1982	Rod Stewart	How Long / Jealous
36	May 1982	John Cougar	Hurts So Good / Close Enough
37	October 1982	John Cougar	Jack And Diane / Danger List
38	January 1983	John Cougar	Hand To Hold on To / Hurts So Good (picture Disc available)
39	?	?	?
40	?	?	?
41	1983	Phil Thornalley	So This Is Love / Last Too Long
42	?	?	?
43	1983	Manteau	Promise / Love Let Down
44	1986	Lewis	Can't Wait Another Minute / ?
45	1986	Lewis Sisters	If The Love Fits / Can't Wait Another Minute
46	1986	Lewis	Man in the moon / Sure Don't Come Easy – extended versions
47	1986	Lewis Sisters	Melting Point / Devil Made Me Do It
48	1987	Lewis Sisters	So Good, So Right / Dangerous
49	1987	Blinding Tears [Cawley And Storie]	Heaven Only Knows / Call of the Wild
50	?	?	?
51	1987	Glory	Hearts Will Sing / As It Is

(No PS) indicates that the record was issued without a Picture Sleeve

List of LP issues on Riva Records in the UK [please fill in the blanks]
Riva No	Date	Artist	Album title
1	18 June 1976	Rod Stewart	A Night on the Town
2	1976	Various Artists	All This And World War II
3	1977	Faces	The Best of the Faces
4	1977	Rod Stewart	Atlantic Crossing (Re-issue)
5	28 October 1977	Rod Stewart	Foot Loose & Fancy Free
6	March 1978	Johnny Cougar	A Biography
7	?	?	?
8	17 November 1978	Rod Stewart	Blondes Have More Fun
9	July 1979	John Cougar	John Cougar
10	July 1981	John Cougar	Nothin' Matters And What If It Did
11	21 November 1980	Rod Stewart	Foolish Behaviour
12	?	?	?
13	?	?	?
14	9 November 1981	Rod Stewart	Tonight I'm Yours
15	1982	Carmine Appice	Carmine Appice
16	June 1982	John Cougar	American Fool
17	6 November 1982	Rod Stewart	Absolutely Live
18	1983	John Cougar	Uh-Huh
19	1985	John Cougar	Scarecrow
20	1986	Blinding Tears [Mark Cawley And Carl Storie]	Blinding Tears

== See also ==
- Lists of record labels
