= Kenny Aronoff =

American drummer (born 1953)

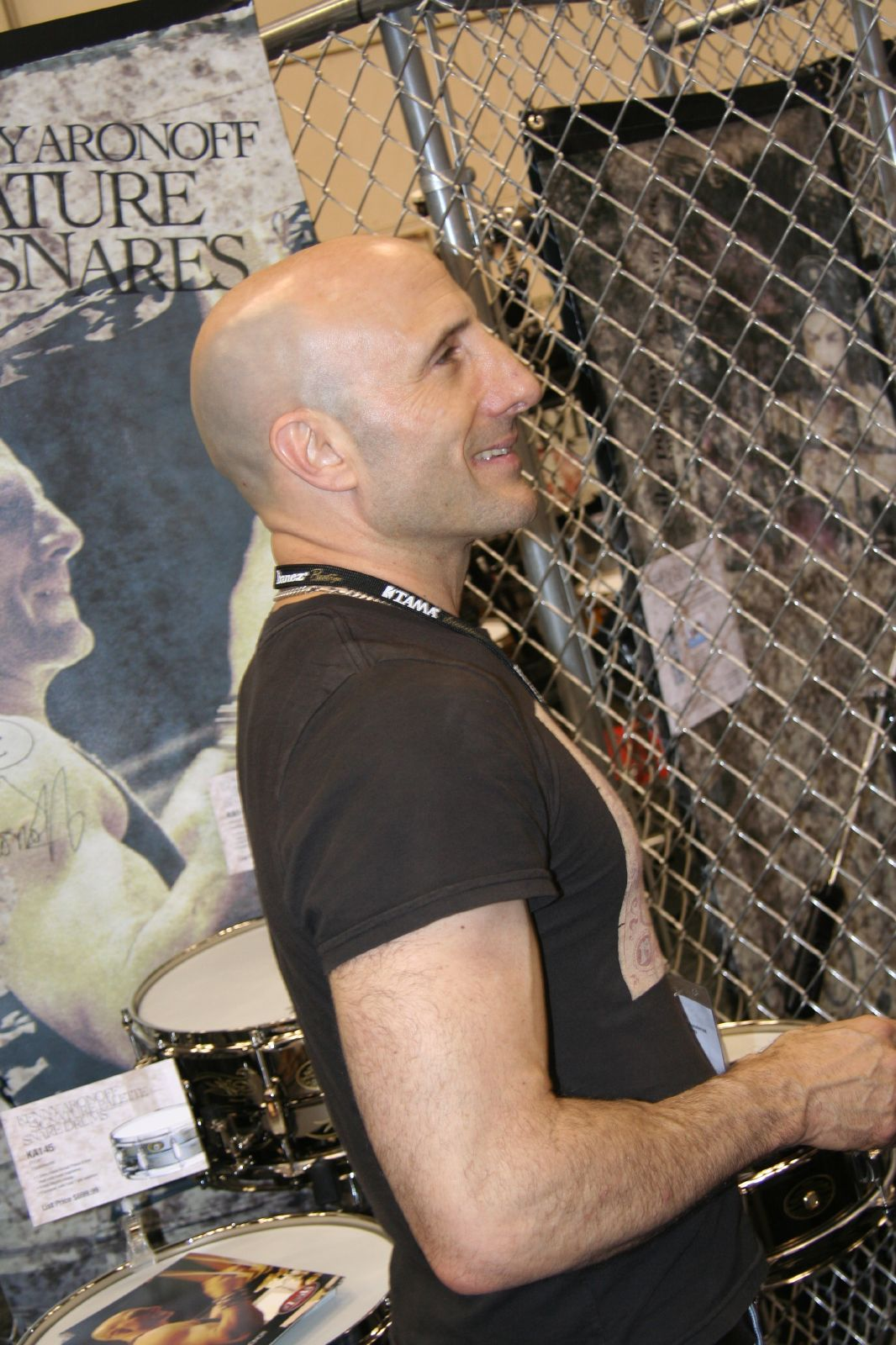
- Aronoff in 2005

Background information
- Born: Kenneth D. Aronoff; March 7, 1953 (age 73); Albany, New York, U.S.
- Occupation: Drummer
- Years active: 1979–present
- Website: kennyaronoff.com

Kenneth D. Aronoff (born March 7, 1953) is an American drummer. He has toured and recorded with a wide range of artists throughout his career, and is perhaps best known for his longtime associations with John Mellencamp and John Fogerty.

Aronoff has also taught drumming at college level and owns the recording studio Uncommon Studios L.A. He is widely recognized as one of the best drummers in history, with his drumming skills having been touted by magazines such as Rolling Stone and Modern Drummer.

== Early life ==
Aronoff was born to a Jewish family and grew up in Stockbridge, Massachusetts. He developed an interest in music at an early age and gravitated to the drums as "drumming was one hundred percent energy." He studied classical music in college both at the University of Massachusetts and Indiana University, from which he graduated in 1976. Several classical orchestras offered him a timpani percussion position which he declined in order to study jazz and fusion drum set work, before joining some bands in Indiana.

Aronoff worked a summer at the Tanglewood Music Festival where he worked with conductors Leonard Bernstein, Aaron Copland and Arthur Fiedler. After which he was offered a seat in Israel’s Jerusalem Symphony Orchestra, which he turned down to pursue his passion for rock and roll music.

== Career ==
In 1980, Aronoff joined the backing band of John Mellencamp, who was using the stage name Johnny Cougar at the time. Aronoff remained with Mellencamp's band for 17 years. He played drums for John Fogerty live and in the studio from 1996 until 2018. Aronoff was Associate Professor of Percussion at Indiana University from 1993 to 1997. Each year, The Aronoff Percussion Scholarship is awarded to an Indiana University percussion student.

Aronoff was an inaugural member of the Independent Music Awards' 2001 first Annual IMA judging panel to support independent artists. He performed at the Kennedy Center Honors from 2008 to 2014. On January 26, 2014, Aronoff performed at the 56th Annual Grammy Awards with Ringo Starr. Aronoff joined Paul McCartney and Ringo Starr in the CBS special The Night That Changed America: A Grammy Salute to the Beatles that aired on February 9, 2014.

In 2011 and 2012, Aronoff substituted for Chad Smith in the supergroup Chickenfoot, which featured Sammy Hagar, Michael Anthony, and Joe Satriani. From 2024 until 2026, Aronoff played with this same group of musicians under the Best of All Worlds tour moniker, a tribute to the Hagar era of Van Halen.

Aronoff played with rock and roll pioneer Jerry Lee Lewis from 2017 until Lewis's death in 2022.

== Legacy ==
On March 31, 2016, Rolling Stone ranked Kenny Aronoff number 66 of the 100 greatest drummers of all time. The magazine wrote, "With a sixth sense for what makes music pop and the patience to take direction, he's ended up as a go-to studio beatsmith for the Rolling Stones, Bob Dylan, Bruce Springsteen, Neil Diamond, Eric Clapton, John Fogerty, Sting, the Smashing Pumpkins, Lady Gaga and tons more." Modern Drummer named Kenny Aronoff the "#1 Pop/Rock Drummer and #1 Studio Drummer" for five consecutive years.
