= Cookie: The Anthropological Mixtape =

Studio album by Meshell Ndegeocello
- Released: June 4, 2002
- Recorded: June–July 2001
- Studios: Hyde Street Studios, Tenderloin, San Francisco
- Genres: R&B; hip hop; funk; jazz; soul; go-go
- Length: 1:11:02
- Label: Maverick
- Producers: Allen Cato, Meshell Ndegeocello

Meshell Ndegeocello chronology
Bitter (1999)	Cookie: The Anthropological Mixtape (2002)	Comfort Woman (2003)

Singles from Cookie: The Anthropological Mixtape
- 1. "Pocketbook" Released: April 8, 2002; 2. "Earth (Ben Watt Remix)" Released: June 11, 2002

Cookie: The Anthropological Mixtape is the fourth studio album by American soul singer and rapper Meshell Ndegeocello, released on June 4, 2002, by Maverick Records. Following the commercial underperformance of her third studio album, Bitter (1999), her label encouraged her to return to her earlier sound and record an album that sounded more "black". Ndegeocello collaborated with a number of prominent Black musicians, including Talib Kweli, Missy Elliott, and Tweet, as well as her backing band, the Conscientious Objectors, and recorded the album during the summer of 2001. The record, which Ndegeocello modeled on the mixtapes of her childhood, adopted a hip-hop and R&B-influenced sound and political lyrics similar to that of her debut album, Plantation Lullabies (1993), focusing on themes such as consumerism, revolution, religion, and same-sex attraction. Throughout the album, Ndegeocello also features samples of recorded speeches by Black activists, poets, and musicians, such as Angela Davis, Gil Scott-Heron, Countee Cullen, and Etheridge Knight.

The album was originally slated to come out in 2001, but its release was repeatedly delayed due to some lyrics regarded as related to the September 11 attacks. Upon its release, the album received universal acclaim from music critics, who praised Ndegeocello's politically conscious lyrics, as well as the assortment of musical styles. Multiple critics ranked it one of the best albums of 2002. In 2003, the album was nominated for Best Contemporary R&B Album at the 45th Annual Grammy Awards, as well as a GLAAD Media Award. The album entered the Billboard 200 and Top R&B/Hip-Hop Albums charts at numbers 67 and 21, respectively, and spawned two singles: a remix of "Pocketbook", featuring Tweet and Redman, and a remix of "Earth", which became a top 20 hit on the Dance Club Songs chart. The album continues to be held in high regard by some critics.

== Background ==
Ndegeocello released her debut studio album, Plantation Lullabies, in 1993 on Maverick. The album received praise in Europe and the US, particularly for its politically conscious lyrics, but some within the queer community expressed disappointment that the album didn't include any songs that explicitly discussed same-sex attraction. A proposed music video for the project would have included a lesbian love scene, but Maverick declined to finance the video, fearing commercial repercussions, and instead aimed to guide Ndegeocello into mainstream success, as with her John Mellencamp duet, "Wild Night". Peace Beyond Passion, her second album, was released in 1996 and featured extensive focus on queer themes. Ndegeocello wanted to record a jazz album for her next project, but after her label discouraged her, she instead recorded Bitter, an album drawing inspiration from acoustic jazz and artists like Bill Withers and Marvin Gaye. The album drew acclaim from music critics, being named the best album of 1999 by multiple outlets, but sold poorly.

Maverick regarded the album as a commercial failure, and executives from the label informed Ndegeocello that the album had underperformed because it wasn't a "black record." Ndegeocello reflected in an interview with the Chicago Tribune that this comment "messes with (her) head," pointing out that "I wake up every day and I'm black". For Ndegeocello's next studio album, her fourth, Maverick urged her to emphasize her race, encouraging her to collaborate with a "who's who" of Black artists, although few responded to her requests for collaboration. Ndegeocello drew inspiration from the mixtapes of her childhood, stating that she wanted to emulate that feeling with Cookie and aimed to create "a mix tape that I’m hoping people will share with their friends". She initially planned to produce the album herself but ultimately enlisted Allen Cato, her guitarist, as a co-producer. She began recording the album with her five-piece band, the Conscientious Objectors, in June 2001; the recording process took about a month. They recorded at Hyde Street Studios in San Francisco's Tenderloin District. Ndegeocello commented that the neighborhood would become "the vibe of" Cookie.

== Composition ==
=== Style and themes ===
"These words are me... I only wrote what I felt about people and music I love. It's the world through my eyes; a chapter in my memoirs. Perhaps others will also feel what I'm feeling."

— Ndegeocello, "Me'Shell Ndegeocello Returns With 'Anthropological Mix'", Billboard, May 11, 2002

The album incorporates elements of jazz, go-go, rap, funk, and soul. Ndegeocello told KCRW in an interview that she regards Cookie as an R&B album and as more easily classified than Bitter. It was regarded as a departure from her previous studio album and a return to the style of Plantation Lullabies, with less confessional lyrics but with more "audaci(ous)" arrangements and "dark" lyrics. Wired argued that the album contrasted with her two "progressively mellow" previous albums, and that on Cookie she was "back with an attitude". In Out, Barry Walters wrote that the album incorporated elements of both Plantation Lullabies and Bitter, combining the former's "confrontational social commentary" and the latter's "hushed pillow talk". A review in Orlando Weekly noted that the album's political themes are reminiscent of her first two albums, but than in comparison to them, Cookie mostly "explores the political inside the personal". Ndegeocello told the Chicago Tribune that revolution was a recurring theme on the album, elaborating that to her, the word refers to "how things evolve. Angela Davis, to me, was one of the original hip-hop MCs, this cycle of people who tried to infiltrate the culture and give another view." She added that the album's title is inspired by the idea of musicians being "spiritual anthropologists who tap into the spirit of the time. It's not about, 'Let's get some guns and take over!'" The album's lyrical themes include criticisms of homophobia, violence, religion, and commercialism.

=== Tracks 1–6 ===
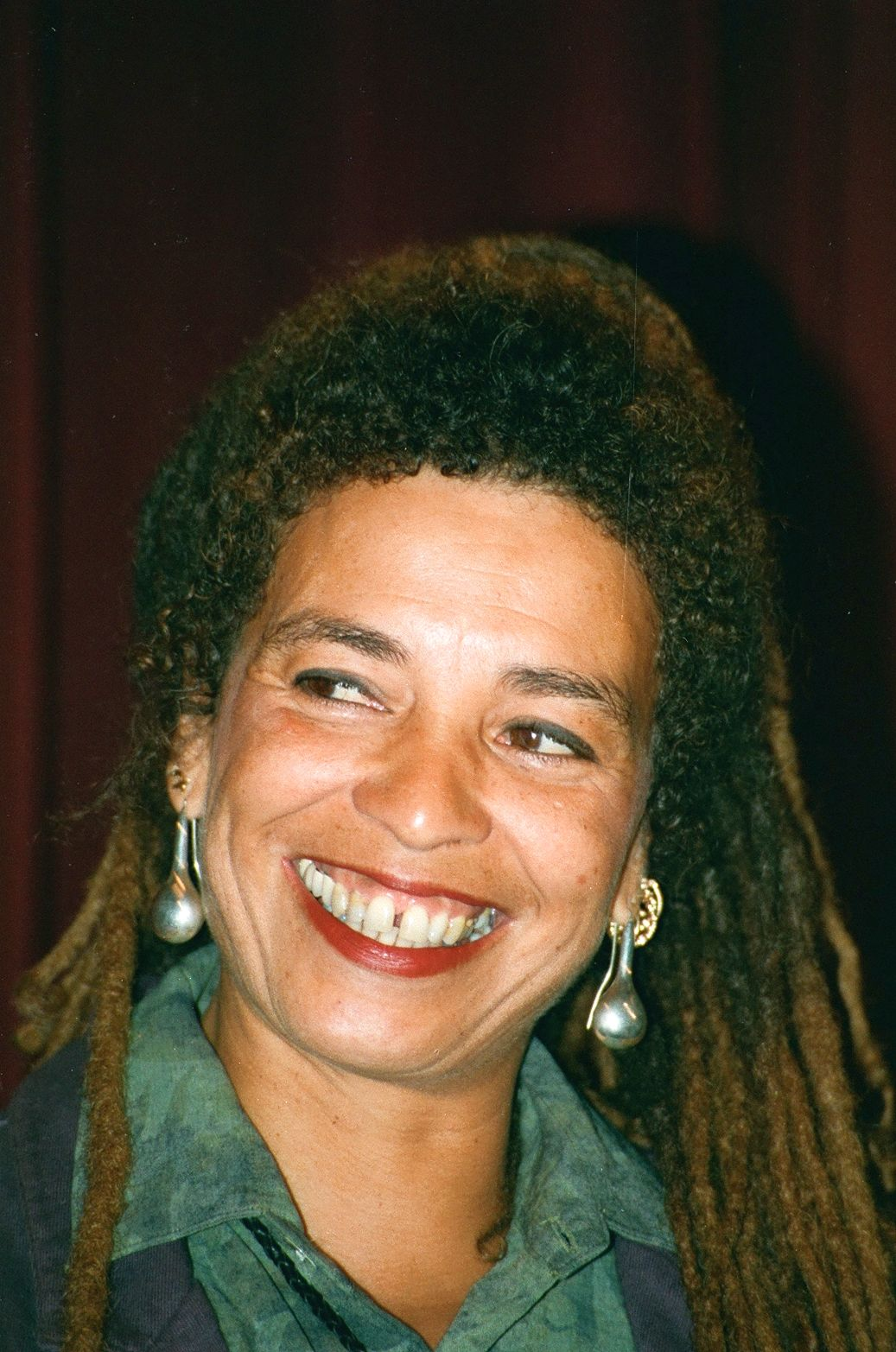
"Hot Night", the second track on Cookie, extensively samples a 1997 speech by activist Angela Davis.

The first two tracks, "Dead Nigga Blvd., Pt. 1" and "Hot Night", were described in a PopMatters review as displaying "Ndegeocello's politics at their most virulent." "Dead Nigga Blvd., Pt. 1", a bass-heavy funk song, criticizes both the government, for not caring about Black America, and Black Americans who "don't take responsibility for themselves", according to Orlando Weekly. The track further condemns cities for naming streets after civil rights icons while failing to improve residents' living conditions. Ndegeocello also considers the definition of "freedom", singing that "perhaps to be free is to love all of those who hate me and die a beautiful death and make pretty brown babies". The song ends with a sample of the Dick Gregory speech Human Rights & Property Rights. PopMatters described it as a "caricature of the hip-hop generation", while Ndegeocello cited Master P as an influence on the song.

"Hot Night", which Blender classified as a "protest rap song", features a rap verse by Kweli, as well samples of civil rights activist Angela Davis's 1997 The Prison-Industrial Complex speech and Puerto Rican salsa singer Héctor Lavoe's song "La Fama". The early work of A Tribe Called Quest inspired the song. Its concept centers on a hot summer night during which friends discuss revolutionary politics. The song opens with Davis discussing her membership in the Communist Party and closes with her comments on the United States' welfare state and poverty. Its chorus includes the lines "it's a hot night/let’s talk about the sign o' the times/politics in the fight of a revolutionary soul singer", with the second line being interpreted as a Prince reference. In an interview with The Michigan Daily, she elaborated that in the context of the song, "revolutionary" means "revolving", pointing to Aretha Franklin and Roberta Flack as examples. Ndegeocello also criticizes materialism in hip-hop culture and discusses the revolutionary power of lyrics. During the bridge, Ndegeocello repeats that "it's a shame the way that we all run around blind to the facts" atop a bass that simulates the sound of a time bomb explosion.

The songs "Priorities 1–6", "Pocketbook", and "Berry Farms" discuss same-sex attraction. "Priorities 1–6" was described by Vibe music critic Ayana Byrd as "a love song devoid of ego." Its chorus consists of the lyrics "I just wanna talk and get to know you/Before I touch you and learn to love you." Ndegeocello's titular priorities consist of "gaudy jewelry; sneakers made for $1.08 but bought for $150; wasted weed, wasted high; the belief we are legendary underworld figures being chased; sex like in the movies; and a mate to pay bills, bills, and automobills." The song criticizes materialism and was interpreted as a response to Destiny's Child's 1999 single "Bills, Bills, Bills". In "Pocketbook", Ndegeocello expresses her desire for a woman, observing her appearance and movement in a tone typical of male rappers. "Berry Farms" (sometimes spelled "Barry Farms"), a G-funk-influenced go-go song which Lewis called "the most explicitly homoerotic track" on the album, is directed to a straight-presenting woman who sexually experiments with Ndegeocello. It has been interpreted as a sequel to "Pocketbook". Ndegeocello asks "Can you love me without shame?" and speculates that her girlfriend keeps their relationship private because she fears scorn and enjoys "the material things" her boyfriend buys her. The title has been interpreted both as a reference to the slang "bush" (as berries grow on bushes) and as a nod to the name of an Anacostia, District of Columbia, public housing project. The piano and bass-centered ballad "Trust" features former Soul II Soul vocalist Caron Wheeler, with a brief interlude of "lushly orchestrated jazz". Writing for Billboard, Michael Paoletta compared the song to Prince's "Do Me, Baby".

=== Tracks 7–16 ===
Many of the songs incorporate samples of speeches and poems. The beat of "Akel Dama" is the sound of a beating heart. The song opens with a sample of the Gil Scott-Heron speech Comment #1, in which he examines the perception that queerness isn't compatible with blackness. The song later samples the Countee Cullen poem Heritage, then The Idea of Ancestry, a poem by Etheridge Knight about the pictures taped to the wall of his jail cell. "Earth", which contains the lyrics "Let me be the rain you thirst for/Let me be the sun you adore... You're my Earth, my paradise" and "let my sweet, sweet ocean caress your shore", drew comparison to Stevie Wonder. Its chorus includes harmonica, bass guitar, and percussion. Wheeler and Lalah Hathaway provide guest vocals on the track. "Better By the Pound", a slowed-down cover of the Funkadelic song, has been described as "swaggering". "Criterion", which features a jazz section, was one of the only songs on the record where all the musicians played together, rather than recording individual tracks. In "God.Fear.Money", a commentary on society's ideals and ethics, Ndegeocello remarks that "I was way down for the revolution, till I found it was contingent upon some corporate sponsorship". The song also describes a world where Jesus is thrown in jail while the Devil is featured on Total Request Live. "Jabril", which "pleads for togetherness", is dedicated to Tupac and The Notorious B.I.G., but Ndegeocello announces her refusal to celebrate them for glamorizing violence in their lyrics. In the song, the narrator "ruminates on her imminent death by gunshot".

"Dead Nigga Blvd., Pt. 2" samples the 1999 HBO special Thug Life in DC and features a guitar solo by Michael Hampton. It opens with the line "You can gain the world and lose your soul worrying about what you ain’t got". The song was considered to continue the "plaintive and thoughtful" lyrics of Part One, while contrasting with the first part by giving voice to the "hip-hop generation" rather than critiquing them. "6 Legged Griot (Weariness)" includes samples of Knight, Claude McKay's poem If We Must Die, and June Jordan's In Memoriam: Martin Luther King Jr. The song arranges samples of their respective works into a conversation, accompanied by Ndegeocello's bass and a saxophone solo by Jacques Schwarz-Bart. Closing out the album is a sped-up remix of "Pocketbook" which features remixing by Missy Elliott and Rockwilder, backing vocals by Tweet, and a rap verse by Redman. It was added to the track listing almost a year after the rest of the album had been completed. Ndegeocello stated that she selected Rockwilder to remix the track because he "could maintain the integrity of the music" while also making it sound like a new song. The album's inclusion of the "radio-friendly" remix was described as "jarring", in contrast with the "explorative nature" of the rest of the record.

== Release and promotion ==
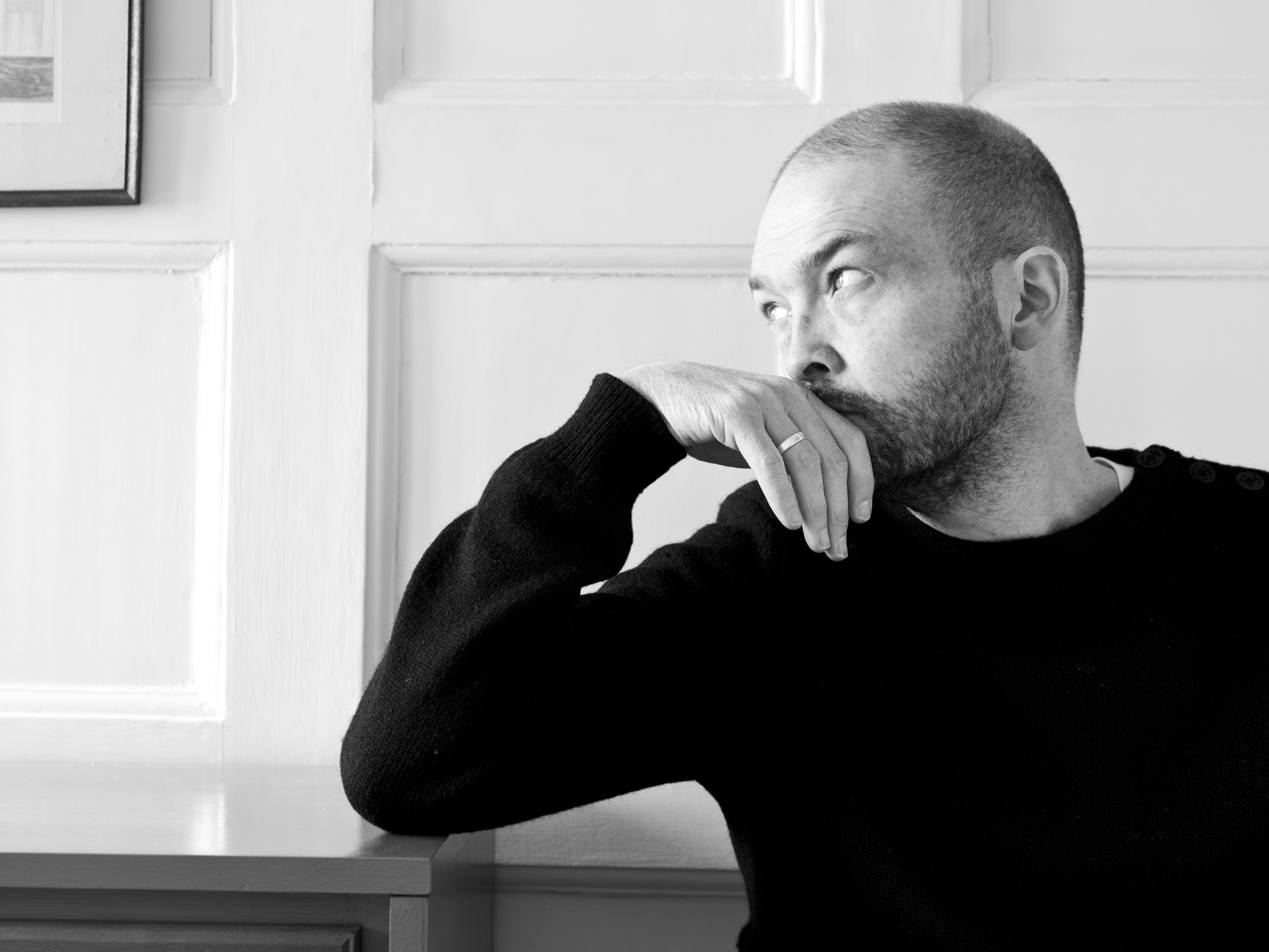
British musician Ben Watt remixed "Earth" for its single release.

The release of Cookie: The Anthropological Mixtape was repeatedly delayed. It was first set to be released in October 2001; however, following the September 11 attacks, the album was put on hold due to a lyric in "Hot Night" in which Ndegeocello sings that "we suffer in a world trade paradise". On October 25, 2001, the Washington Post reported that the album's tentative title was Cookie: The Anthropological Mixtape, and that it was due to be released "early next year". The release date was pushed to February 12, 2002, but the release date was delayed again, with the Chicago Reader reporting in December 2001 that the album would be released in March 2002. The album's release date was eventually pushed to June 2002. In addition to the album's delayed release, the label forced Ndegeocello to use a different album cover, deeming the initial one inappropriate in the aftermath of the attacks. She stated that she wanted the lead single to be "Hot Night", but that her label would not allow it, given the world trade lyric.

The album was officially released on June 4, 2002. It was Ndegeocello's first album to display the simplified spelling of her last name, without an accent mark over the second "e". To promote the album, Maverick ran print ads in magazines including Billboard, Vibe, and Out, highlighting critics' praise of the album and noting that the album features "Pocketbook", "Hot Night", and "Earth". In further promotion of the record, Ebony hosted its inaugural Ebony Listening Lounge event, sponsored by Coca-Cola, for the album. Ndegeocello told the Chicago Tribune that she anticipated it would attract fans online and bring people to her tours, rather than attaining success on radio.

The album spawned two singles: "Pocketbook" and "Earth". The Rockwilder and Missy Elliott remix of "Pocketbook" was sent to urban radio during the week of April 8, 2002, and to crossover radio in June. By May, it was in rotation on Philadelphia and New York City radio stations. A music video, directed by Liz Friedlander, satirizes the music industry's promotion methods. It depicts Ndegeocello as a DJ in front of a crowd of dancers, some of whom are girls in short shorts with signs reading "Buy my record". PopMatters deemed it one of the best music videos of 2002, calling it the "Sharpest Bite of the Hand that Feeds You". In the week ending June 9, the music video was added to the rotation on music video network MTV2. The second single, "Earth", was released as a remix by former Everything but the Girl member Ben Watt. The remix entered the Billboard Dance Club Play chart (since renamed Dance Club Songs) at number 47 on the chart dated March 30, 2002. Following its commercial release, it also entered the Dance Maxi-Single Sales chart at number 14 on the chart dated June 29. The CD single included remixes of the track, as well as two B-sides: "Trust" and "The Teaching". A dance remix was also sold digitally for 99 cents, a strategy which Billboard regarded as unusual.

To further promote the album, Ndegeocello gave a series of concerts. Two days before the release of Cookie, on June 2, she performed a set at New York City's Bowery Ballroom, including songs from the forthcoming album. On June 7, she performed at Irving Plaza in New York City. On October 24, she performed at Galaxy Theater in Santa Ana. The following night, she performed at Los Angeles's Wiltern Theater, with R&B singer Mystic as her opening act.

== Reception ==
Professional ratings
Aggregate scores
Source	Rating
Metacritic	82/100
Review scores
Source	Rating
AllMusic	4/5 stars
Blender	3/5 stars
Entertainment Weekly	A
Los Angeles Times	3/4 stars
Rolling Stone	4/5 stars
Rolling Stone Album Guide	3/5 stars
Slant Magazine	4/5 stars
Spin	8/10
Vibe	4/5
The Village Voice	A−

Upon its release, Cookie: The Anthropological Mixtape received universal acclaim from music critics. In the issue of Billboard dated June 8, 2002, the album was featured among the new release "Spotlights", with Paoletta writing that the album "crackles with intensity, be it of the sexual, political, or religious kind", and concluding that the album "offers huge rewards" to open minded listeners. Austin Chronicle music critic Christopher Coletti, writing a joint review of new albums by P.Diddy, Eminem, Nelly, Wyclef Jean, Lauryn Hill, and Ndegeocello, regarded Cookie as the "most luscious" of the six records, writing that Ndegeocello "hits harder" than Hill. The Christian Science Monitor, in an overview of female musicians' new albums, called Ndegeocello "a female Gil Scott-Heron" and praised her "masterly" fusion of different musical styles. A review for The A.V. Club, written by Stephen Thompson, regarded the album as more ambitious and less consistent than Ndegeocello's previous records, but concluded that the missteps were worth it, because "her complex journey is a glorious destination in and of itself". Thompson named "Berry Farms" the best track. A review for Exclaim!, penned by Del F. Cowie, praised the production and background vocals, and although positing that Ndegeocello's fusion of soul and jazz caused "leaden pacing" in places, concluding that "the results are mesmerizing". Entertainment Weekly critic Chimbo Tyehimba called Cookie "tasty" and considered it personal yet entertaining. Richard Hilburn, writing for the Los Angeles Times, praised "Jabril", "Berry Farms", and "Trust", and opined that although "Earth" and "Better By the Pound" were weaker inclusions, the album would be her "fourth straight four-star collection" if it were 20 minutes shorter.

Some critics were more mixed in their assessments of the album. Blender, in a review by Kieran Scott, awarded the album three stars out of five, remarking that her music could sound "sleepy" because of her lack of "blaring hooks", but concluding that "her agile ambition tells an important tale about wisdom and dignity". Dan Leroy, writing for Launch, questioned whether listeners, after 9/11, would welcome her samples of figures like Davis and her anti-capitalist messages, concluding that the album is best on songs like "Trust", which make "the political personal". The following year, writing in LA Weekly, critic Ernest Hardy voiced disappointment in the album, praising her samples of speeches by Black activists but likening it to "Meshell for dummies" and arguing that the lyrics were too "obvious" and "clunky" compared to albums like Bitter and Comfort Woman (2003). Washington Post critic Ta-Nehisi Coates praised "Hot Night" but called the album's midsection "a slow, droning soundtrack for an insomniac", opining that the album doesn't reflect the "energy and passion" of Ndegeocello's live performances. Brian Carr, writing for The Dallas Morning News and Orlando Sentinel, called the album "energetic yet introspective" and noted that the samples "give props to the past but are set within fresh, contemporary grooves", but concluded that it was unlikely "to be a breakthrough disc".

The album debuted at number 67 on the Billboard 200 with first-week sales of 17,000. It thereby became her second appearance in the top 100 of that chart, and her first since 1996, when her second album, Peace Beyond Passion, reached a peak of number 63. The album also debuted and peaked at number 21 on the Top R&B/Hip-Hop Albums chart, her fourth consecutive top 40 entry on that chart, and her highest-peaking since Peace Beyond Passion reached number 15. It would remain Ndegeocello's last top 40 entry on the R&B/Hip-Hop Albums chart until 2011, when her ninth studio album, Weather, reached number 37; it is also her last album top peak in the top 100 of the Billboard 200. In 2007, critic John Murph reflected that the album "failed to have the commercial impact (Ndegeocello) hoped for", and regarded it as her last attempt "to break into the mainstream R&B scene".

=== Accolades ===
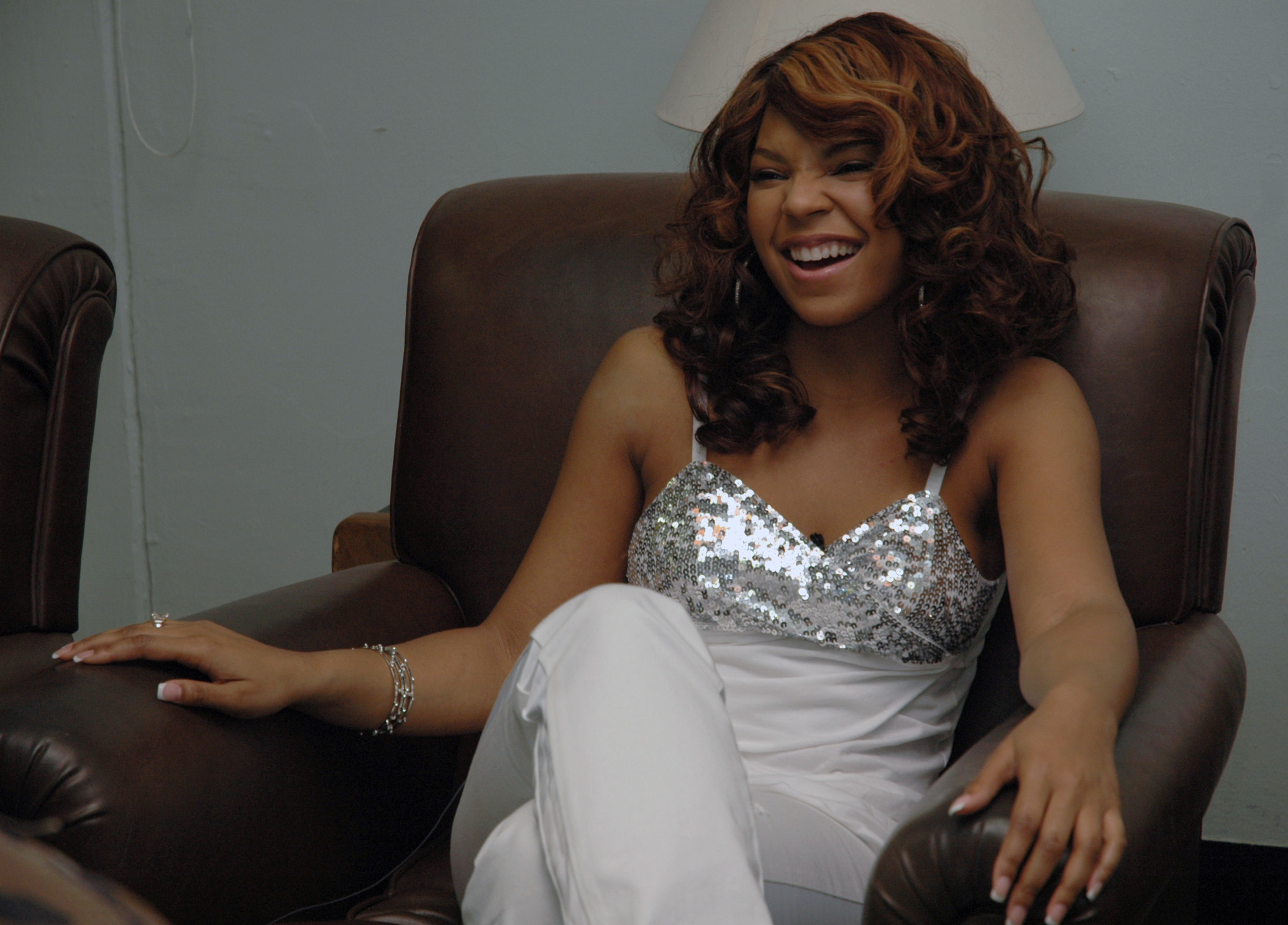
Cookie was nominated for the Grammy Award for Best Contemporary R&B Album, but lost to the debut album by Ashanti.

The album was also regarded as significant by critics and academics: Upon its release, some outlets described the record as one of the all-time best conscious hip-hop albums. Mark Anthony Neal recognized it as "the first major pop recording that speaks to the era of 'newblackness'", referring to a term coined by Mama Soul. At the end of 2002, music critic Robert Christgau ranked the album at number 76 on the Pazz & Jop 2002 Dean's List, while the Honolulu Star-Bulletin named the album one of the year's ten best albums, with critic Gary C.W. Chun praising its "earthy richness".

At the 45th Annual Grammy Awards, held in 2003, Cookie was nominated for Best Contemporary R&B Album, the first year of the award's existence. It marked Ndegeocello's third album to receive a Grammy nomination, after Plantation Lullabies and Peace Beyond Passion, and her seventh nomination overall. Writing for the Los Angeles Times, Natalie Nichols predicted that Ashanti's eponymous debut album would win, but argued that Cookie deserved to, "not only for its sonic creativity but also for its racial, social and historical ruminations." The San Francisco Chronicle predicted that Brandy's Full Moon would win, but likewise granted the "critics' pick" designation to Cookie. For Slant, critic Sal Cinquemani predicted that Cookie, along with R&B duo Floetry's debut album, "might be too contemporary for academy voters", but concluded that while Ashanti's album would win, Cookie "should win". Ashanti ultimately won the award. The album was also nominated for Outstanding Music Album at the 14th GLAAD Media Awards, with the award eventually going to k.d. lang and Tony Bennett, for A Wonderful World.

In 2010, Slant ranked Cookie at number 249 on their list of the best albums of the 2000s. The Rockwilder remix of "Pocketbook" placed at number 229 on their list of the decade's best singles. Village Voice critic Carol Cooper wrote in 2011 that Cookie was "arguably the smartest r&b album of the 2000s". The next year, National Public Radio called the album "ludicrously underrated".

== Track listing ==
1. "Dead Nigga Blvd., Pt. 1" (Meshell Ndegeocello, Allen Cato) – 3:03
2. "Hot Night" (Supa Dave West, Ndegeocello, Talib Kweli, Héctor Lavoe) – 4:32
3. "Interlude: Blah Blah Blah, Dyba Dyba Dyba" (Ndegeocello, Cato) – :40
4. "Priorities 1–6" (Ndegeocello, Cato) – 3:43
5. "Pocketbook" (Ndegeocello) – 4:00
6. "Barry Farms" (Ndegeocello) – 5:20
7. "Trust" (Ndegeocello) – 5:25
8. "Akel Dama (Field of Blood)" (Ndegeocello, Michael Cain) – 7:27
9. "Earth" (Ndegeocello, Cato) – 5:14
10. "Better By the Pound" (George Clinton, Grace Cook) – 5:23
11. "Criterion" (Ndegeocello) – 4:27
12. "GOD.FEAR.MONEY" (Ndegeocello) – 3:31
13. "Jabril" (Ndegeocello) – 6:06
14. "Dead Nigga Blvd., Pt. 2" (Ndegeocello, Cato) – 3:13
15. "Interlude: 6 Legged Griot Trio (Weariness)" (Ndegeocello) – 4:53
16. "Pocketbook (Rockwilder and Missy Elliott Remix)" (Ndegeocello, Missy Elliott, Dana Stinson, Reggie Noble) – 3:59

== Personnel ==
=== Musicians ===
- Meshell Ndegeocello – vocals, bass guitar, additional instruments ("everything else")
- Allen Cato – guitar, drum programming, vocal arrangement (#2, 9)
- Federico González Peña – Rhodes electric piano (#7), piano (#9, 13, 15)
- Michael Cain – piano (#8)
- Grégoire Maret – harmonica (#9, 13)
- Jacques Schwarz-Bart – tenor saxophone (#10, 11, 13, 15)
- Marcus Miller – bass clarinet and fretless bass (#13)
- Michael Hampton – electric guitar (#14)
- Oliver Gene Lake Jr. – drums (#9, 11–13, 15)
- Kiggo Wellman – drums (#6)
- Sean Rickman – drums (#10)
- Alfredo Mojica – percussion (#7, 9–11, 13)
- Supa Dave West – track programming (#2)
- Talib Kweli – rapper (#2)
- Lalah Hathaway – vocals (#9, 13), vocal arrangement (#9)
- Caron Wheeler – vocals (#7, 9, 10, 11)
- Redman – rapper (#16)
- Tweet – vocals (#16)
- Spoken words by Dick Gregory (#1), Angela Davis (#2), Gil Scott-Heron (#8), Countee Cullen (#8), Etheridge Knight (#8, 15), Claude McKay (#15), June Jordan (#15)

=== Production ===
- Produced by Allen Cato and Meshell Ndegeocello
- "Hot Night" (#2) co-produced by Supa Dave West
- "Pocketbook" remix (#16) produced by Rockwilder and Missy Elliott
- Recorded by Eric Dyba and Allen Cato
- Additional post production editing by Rail Jon Rogut
- Mixed by Bob Power
- Assisting and additional mixing by Andrew Brooks
- Mastering by Tom Coyne
- Art direction and design by Frank Maddocks
- Photography by David Fenton
- Kofi Taha – executive producer
- A&R by Damu Mtume and Danny Strick

== Charts ==
Weekly chart performance for Cookie: The Anthropological Mixtape
Chart (2002)	Peak position
US Billboard 200	67
US Top R&B/Hip-Hop Albums (Billboard)	21

== Sources ==
- Clay, Andreana (2008). ""Like an Old Soul Record": Black Feminism, Queer Sexuality, and the Hip-Hop Generation". Meridians. 8 (1): 53–73. doi:10.2979/MER.2008.8.1.53. JSTOR 40338911. S2CID 197656722.
- Flick, Larry (July 9, 2002). "Meshell lays it all out". The Advocate (867): 66–67.
- Goldin-Perschbacher, Shana (October 2013). ""The World Has Made Me the Man of My Dreams": Meshell Ndegeocello and the 'problem' of Black female masculinity". Popular Music. 32 (3): 471–496. doi:10.1017/S0261143013000329. JSTOR 24736785. S2CID 154419020.
- Kernodle, Tammy (2013). "Diggin' You Like Those Ol' Soul Records: Meshell Ndegeocello and the Expanding Definition of Funk in Postsoul America". American Studies. 52 (4): 181–204. doi:10.1353/ams.2013.0109. S2CID 143927603.
- Lewis, Nghana (Spring 2006). ""You Sell Your Soul like You Sell a Piece of Ass": Rhythms of Black Female Sexuality and Subjectivity in MeShell Ndegeocello's "Cookie: The Anthropological Mixtape"". Black Music Research Journal. 26 (1): 111–130. JSTOR 25433764.
