= Shana Zadrick =

American model (born 1969)

- Born: Shana Zadrick; February 14, 1969 (age 57); Grand Junction, Colorado, U.S.
- Modeling information
- Height: 1.75 m (5 ft 9 in)
- Hair color: Brown
- Eye color: Dark Brown

Shana Zadrick (born February 14, 1969) is an American model. She has appeared on the cover of several editions of Vogue Italia and in the 1992 Sports Illustrated Swimsuit Issue. She appeared in the second music video for John Mellencamp and Meshell Ndegeocello's version of "Wild Night" by Van Morrison, a track from Mellencamp's album Dance Naked. She has done print work for leading fashion labels including Michael Kors, Calvin Klein and Guess.
