= Comet, Come to Me =

Studio album by Meshell Ndegeocello
- Released: June 2, 2014
- Genre: R&B; art pop; avant-pop
- Length: 46:17
- Label: Naïve
- Producer: Smoke and Mirrors

Meshell Ndegeocello chronology
Pour une Âme Souveraine: A Dedication to Nina Simone (2012)	Comet, Come to Me (2014)	Ventriloquism (2018)

Professional ratings
Aggregate scores
Source	Rating
Metacritic	72/100
Review scores
Source	Rating
AllMusic	4/5 stars
Los Angeles Times	3/4 stars
PopMatters	6/10 stars

Comet, Come to Me is the 11th studio album by U.S. singer Meshell Ndegeocello, released 2 June 2014, on Naïve Records.

Kyle Fleck of The Stranger described the album as "a lyrically haunted yet lushly produced set of alienated art pop for adults." Andy Kellman of AllMusic described it as a continuation of Devil's Halo (2009) and Weather (2011), "with well-defined and uncluttered songs that have subtle and artful touches and twists."

== Track listing ==
No.	Title	Writer(s)	Length
1.	"Friends"	Whodini	4:56
2.	"Tom"	Chris Bruce, Doyle Bramhall II, Meshell Ndegeocello, Tom Mediodia	2:55
3.	"Good Day Bad"	Chris Bruce, Meshell Ndegeocello	4:18
4.	"Forget My Name"	Chris Bruce, Elizabeth Lea, Jebin Bruni, Meshell Ndegeocello	4:22
5.	"And Yet It Moves"	Jebin Bruni	0:30
6.	"Comet, Come to Me"	Chris Bruce, Gabe Noel, Meshell Ndegeocello, Shara Worden	4:40
7.	"Continuous Performance"	Kenneth Fearing, Meshell Ndegeocello, Peter Davis	3:22
8.	"Shopping for Jazz"	Chris Bruce, Chris Connelly, Earl Harvin, Jebin Bruni, Meshell Ndegeocello	2:48
9.	"Conviction"	Chris Bruce, Kaveh Rastegar, Meshell Ndegeocello	3:41
10.	"Folie a Deux"	Amatus-sami, Meshell Ndegeocello	3:37
11.	"Choices"	Eric Elterman, Meshell Ndegeocello, Otto Hauser	3:59
12.	"Modern Time"	Chris Bruce, Jebin Bruni, Meshell Ndegeocello, Stacy-Ann Chin	4:28
13.	"American Rhapsody"	Kenneth Fearing, Meshell Ndegeocello, Peter Davis	2:49

== Chart positions ==
Chart (2014)	Peak position
Belgian Albums (Ultratop Flanders)	194
Belgian Albums (Ultratop Wallonia)	170
Japanese Albums (Oricon)	154
US Billboard 200	161
US Independent Albums (Billboard)	28
US Top R&B/Hip-Hop Albums (Billboard)	22
