= 15th GLAAD Media Awards =

Annual US media awards ceremony

15th Annual GLAAD Media Awards (2004) were presented at three separate ceremonies: March 27 in Los Angeles; April 12 in New York City and June 5 in San Francisco. The awards were presented to honor "fair, accurate and inclusive" representations of gay individuals in the media.

== Awards and nominees ==
Winners are presented in bold.

=== Film Awards ===
- Outstanding Film - Wide Release
  - **Bend It Like Beckham**
  - Under the Tuscan Sun
- Outstanding Film - Limited Release
  - Die, Mommie, Die! (Sundance Film Series)
  - Gasoline (Strand Releasing)
  - Madame Satã (Wellspring Media, Inc.)
  - Mambo Italiano (Samuel Goldwyn Films)
  - **Yossi & Jagger** (Strand Releasing)

=== Television Awards ===
- Outstanding Drama Series
  - Degrassi: The Next Generation (The N)
  - Nip/Tuck (FX)
  - **Playmakers** (ESPN)
  - Queer as Folk (Showtime)
  - Six Feet Under (HBO)
- Outstanding Comedy Series
  - It's All Relative (ABC)
  - Oliver Beene (Fox)
  - Reno 911! (Comedy Central)
  - **Sex and the City** (HBO)
  - Will & Grace (NBC)
- Outstanding Individual Episode (in a series without a regular gay character)
  - "A Time to Hate", Cold Case (CBS)
  - "And Baby Makes Four", Girlfriends (UPN)
  - **"Chapter Fifty-Eight", Boston Public** (Fox)
  - "Fallacy", Law & Order: Special Victims Unit (NBC)
  - "Sleeping Lions", The Brotherhood of Poland, New Hampshire (CBS)
- Outstanding Television Movie or Mini-Series
  - **Angels in America** (HBO)
  - Cambridge Spies (BBC America)
  - Normal (HBO)
  - Soldier's Girl (Showtime)
  - Tipping the Velvet (BBC America)
- Outstanding Reality Program
  - The Amazing Race 4 (CBS)
  - America's Next Top Model (UPN)
  - Boy Meets Boy (Bravo)
  - **Queer Eye for the Straight Guy** (Bravo)
  - Real World/Road Rules Challenge: The Gauntlet (MTV)
- Outstanding Documentary
  - A Boy Named Sue (Showtime)
  - **Brother Outsider: The Life of Bayard Rustin** (PBS)
  - Daddy & Papa (PBS)
  - Hope Along the Wind: The Life of Harry Hay (PBS)
  - School's Out: The Life of a Gay High School in Texas (MTV)
- Outstanding Daily Drama
  - **All My Children** (ABC)
- Outstanding Talk Show
  - "Alyn Libman", The Sharon Osbourne Show (syndicated)
  - **"The Husband Who Became a Woman", The Oprah Winfrey Show** (syndicated)
- Outstanding TV Journalism
  - "The Death of Sakia Gunn", Live from the Headlines (CNN)
  - "Father Raymond: A Question of Faith and Identity", Nightline (ABC)
  - "It's in to Be 'Out'", 20/20 (ABC)
  - **"Not Fit to Fight", Primetime Thursday** (ABC) (tie)
  - **"Up Close: The Killing of Gwen Araujo", KCAL 9 News** (KCAL - Los Angeles) (tie)

=== Print ===
- Outstanding Magazine Article
  - "Motherhood My Way" by Jacqueline Woodson, Essence
  - **"The New Face of Gay Power" by John Cloud, Time**
  - "One of These Men Used to Be a She" by Nanette Varian, Glamour
  - "Their True Selves" by Kade Collins and Samantha Lease as told to Stephanie Booth, Teen People
  - "To Be Young, Gifted and Gay" by Farah Stockman, Honey
- Outstanding Magazine Overall Coverage
  - The Nation
  - National Catholic Reporter
  - **Newsweek**
  - People
  - Time
- Outstanding Newspaper Article
  - **"Angels, Reagan and AIDS in America" by Frank Rich** (The New York Times)
  - "For Gays, Secrecy in Love, War" by Patricia Ward Biederman (Los Angeles Times)
  - "Gays Feel Left Out of Morehouse Brotherhood" by Craig Seymour (The Atlanta Journal-Constitution)
  - "Same-Sex Unions Move Center Stage" by David Von Drehle (The Washington Post)
  - "Straddling Sexes" by Louise Rafkin (San Francisco Chronicle)
- Outstanding Newspaper Columnist
  - Dave Ford (San Francisco Chronicle)
  - **Ellen Goodman (The Boston Globe)**
  - Ed Gray (Boston Herald)
  - Leonard Pitts, Jr. (The Miami Herald)
  - Deb Price (The Detroit News)
- Outstanding Newspaper Overall Coverage
  - The Boston Globe
  - Chicago Tribune
  - **The New York Times**
  - San Francisco Chronicle
  - USA Today
- Outstanding Advertising - Print
  - **"Absolut Out."** - Absolut
  - "R You Ready to Adopt a New Lifestyle?" - Chereskin
- Outstanding Comic Book
  - The Authority (Wildstorm/DC Comics)
  - **Catwoman** (DC Comics)
  - Gotham Central (DC Comics)
  - How Loathsome (NBM Publishing)
  - Strangers in Paradise (Abstract Studio)

=== Digital ===
- Outstanding Digital Journalism Article
  - "Abuse and Neglect" by David Tuller, Salon.com
  - "Lives Less Ordinary" by Bryan Robinson, ABC News.com
  - "Out at the Prom" by Julie Scelfo, Newsweek/MSNBC.com
  - "Out of Step" by Martha Brant, Newsweek/MSNBC.com
  - **"Same-Sex Family Values" by Laura McClure**, Salon.com
- Outstanding Advertising - Electronic
  - **Hotel Matrix** - Orbitz
  - "Marco: Independence" - The N
  - "Wedding" - Snapple
- Outstanding Digital Journalism Article (Spanish-language)
  - **"Homosexuales: realidades y prejuicios" by Grace Fuller, CNNenespañol.com**
  - "Una decisión que puede sentar un precedente para el resto de EE.UU." by Grace Fuller, CNNenespañol.com
  - "Victoria para matrimonios del mismo sexo" by Emilio Guerra, Univision.com

=== Music & Theater ===
- Outstanding Music Artist
  - Bitch and Animal, Sour Juice and Rhyme
  - Junior Senior, D-D-Don't Don't Stop the Beat
  - Meshell Ndegeocello, Comfort Woman
  - Peaches, Fatherfucker
  - **Rufus Wainwright, Want One**
- Outstanding Los Angeles Theater
  - Autumn Canticle
  - Blues for an Alabama Sky
  - Body of Faith
  - **Miss Coco Peru is Undaunted**
  - Naked Will: The Portrait of W.H.
- Outstanding New York Theater: Broadway and Off-Broadway
  - Avenue Q
  - Flesh and Blood
  - **I Am My Own Wife**
  - The Last Sunday in June
  - Taboo
- Outstanding New York Theater: Off-Off-Broadway
  - Auntie Mayhem
  - Bernadette and the Butcher of Broadway
  - **Marga Gomez's Intimate Details**
  - Say You Love Satan
  - To My Chagrin

=== Special Recognition Awards ===
- Vanguard Award - Antonio Banderas
- Davidson/Valentini Award - Clive Barker
- Vito Russo Award - Cherry Jones
- Excellence in Media Award - Julianne Moore
- Golden Gate Award - Megan Mullally
- Stephen F. Kolzak Award - John Waters
- Barbara Gittings Award - In the Life
- Favorite OUT Image of the Year - All My Children
- Special Recognition: Off the Roof (Mun2)
- Special Recognition: Gavin Newsom

== Sponsors ==
- Presenting Sponsor: Absolut Vodka
- Platinum Underwriters: Wells Fargo, IBM
- Underwriters: Anheuser-Busch, Banana Republic, Coors, Jaguar Cars, Land Rover, Lehman Brothers, Motorola, The Michael Palm Foundation, Terry K. Watanbe
- Gold Patrons: Autonomy, Blockbuster, HBO, MTV Networks, Perrier, PlanetOut, Prudential Financial, Rancho Zabaco, Showtime, Starbucks, Time Warner, Tylenol PM
- Patrons: The Advocate/Out, AT&T, Bravo, William Q. Derrough and Alvaro G. Salas - Jefferies & Co., Inc., Eastman Kodak, Fox Entertainment Group, The Honorable Michael Huffington, Le Montrose Suite Hotel, Barbara & Garry Marshall, The McGraw-Hill Companies, McKinsey & Company - Media & Entertainment Practice, New Line Cinema / Fine Line Features, Paramount Pictures, Polo Ralph Lauren, Prime Access, Daniel H. Renberg, Andrew Tobias & Charles Nolan, Verizon, Steven Victorin & Neil Parker, Weil, Gotshal & Manges, LLP
- Sponsors: ABC News, American Express Company, AON / Albert G. Ruben Insurance Services Inc., Bloomberg, BrownCo. a brokerage service of J.P. Morgan, LLC, Burson-Marsteller, Carsey Werner Mandabach, CBS/UPN, Creative Artists Agency, Daily Variety, Deloitte, Entertainment Partners, Fuse, Gay Channel by MTV Networks, Rufus Gifford & Russell Bennett, Gibbons, Del Deo, Dolan, Griffinger & Vecchione, Heineken USA, The Hollywood Reporter, HSBC Bank USA, InStyle, Leslie, Engell & Associates, LLP, Levi Strauss & Company, Lifetime, Microsoft, Miramax Films, Paramount Pictures, People en Español, People, Tony Phelps & Luxe Limousine World Wide Transportation Service, Rhino/Warner Strategic Marketing, Ted Snowdon, Sundance Channel, Time Inc., Time, UBS, Univision Communications, The Walt Disney Company, Warner Bros. Records, Marc Wolinsky & Barry Skovgaard, Yahoo!, The York Hotel
- Special Thanks: American Airlines
