= Devil's Halo =

Studio album by Me'Shell Ndegéocello
- Released: October 6, 2009
- Genres: Alternative rock; soul; jazz rock; R&B; pop; avant-garde
- Length: 36:45
- Label: Downtown
- Producers: Chris Bruce; Keith Ciancia; Me'Shell Ndegéocello

Me'Shell Ndegéocello chronology
The World Has Made Me the Man of My Dreams (2007)	Devil's Halo (2009)	Weather (2011)

Devil's Halo is the eighth studio album by American singer-songwriter and bassist Me'Shell Ndegéocello. It was released by Downtown Records on October 6, 2009.

After writing songs for over a year, Ndegéocello recorded Devil's Halo in seven days with audio engineer S. Husky Höskulds. She was accompanied by a band featuring drummer Deantoni Parks, guitarist Chris Bruce, and keyboardist Keefus Ciancia; Bruce and Ciancia produced the record with Ndegéocello. The resulting music featured an eclectic fusion of styles, including alternative rock, soul, and jazz-rock, while Ndegéocello's spiritually complex and ambiguous lyrics spoke of romantic love and loneliness, among other themes.

The album charted modestly, reaching number 185 on the Billboard 200. Critically, it was well received, with most reviewers applauding the emotional depth and challenging quality of the music.

== Writing and recording ==
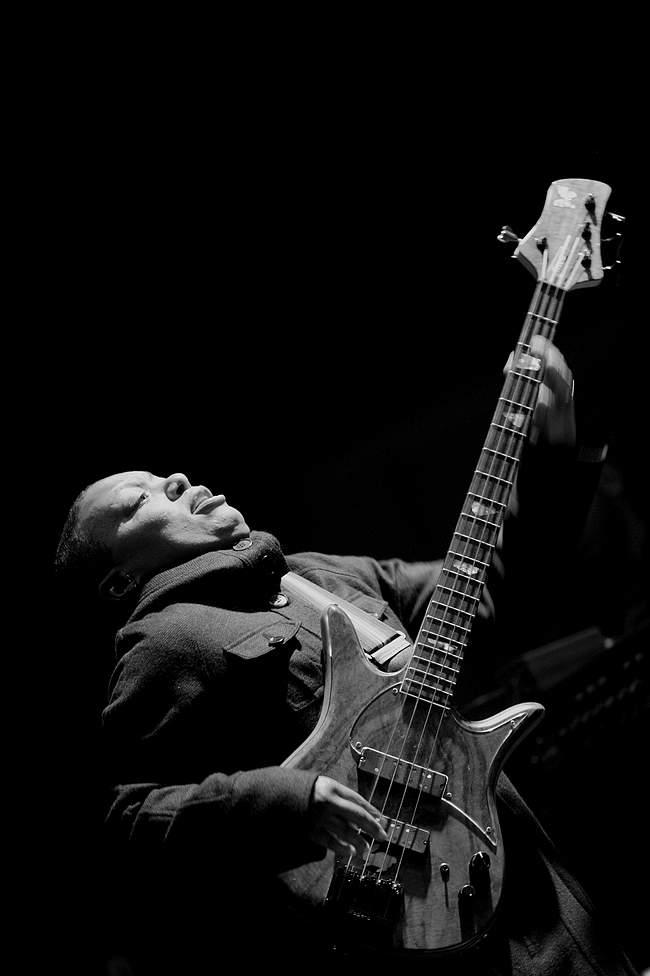
Ndegéocello in 2007

Ndegéocello spent over a year writing the songs from Devil's Halo, being inspired in part by her trip to Ireland. "I went to a couple of pubs and there were much older gentlemen playing the guitar and just singing these amazing, simple songs", Ndegéocello recalled. "I really admired that. I wanted to get to that kind of place where the song could just exist with a guitar and a vocal." With Icelandic audio engineer S. Husky Höskulds, Ndegéocello proceeded to record the album in seven days, backed by a band that featured guitarist Chris Bruce, keyboardist Keefus Ciancia, and drummer Deantoni Parks. She later credited them with providing her inspiration and critique while keeping her "clear about what is the real focus—in life and in music". Their instruments were recorded live without digital post-production, which Ben Ratliff of The New York Times said contributed to the music's raw and organic sound.

== Musical style ==
The music of Devil's Halo featured a "catholicity of sounds", as The Boston Globe's Sarah Rodman described. Ndegéocello performed here in what Nick Coleman of The Independent called "the alt-rock idiom", while Slant Magazine's Matthew Cole regarded it as an R&B record that utilized textures from experimental rock and electronica. Jacqueline Smith from The New Zealand Herald said its fusion of styles was based in soul music: "Though it channelled everyone from Sade to Santana, it's an album of mostly soul - of the soul-baring kind". AllMusic's Thom Jurek found the record's "soulish, near-pop, rock tunes" starker than her previous three albums.

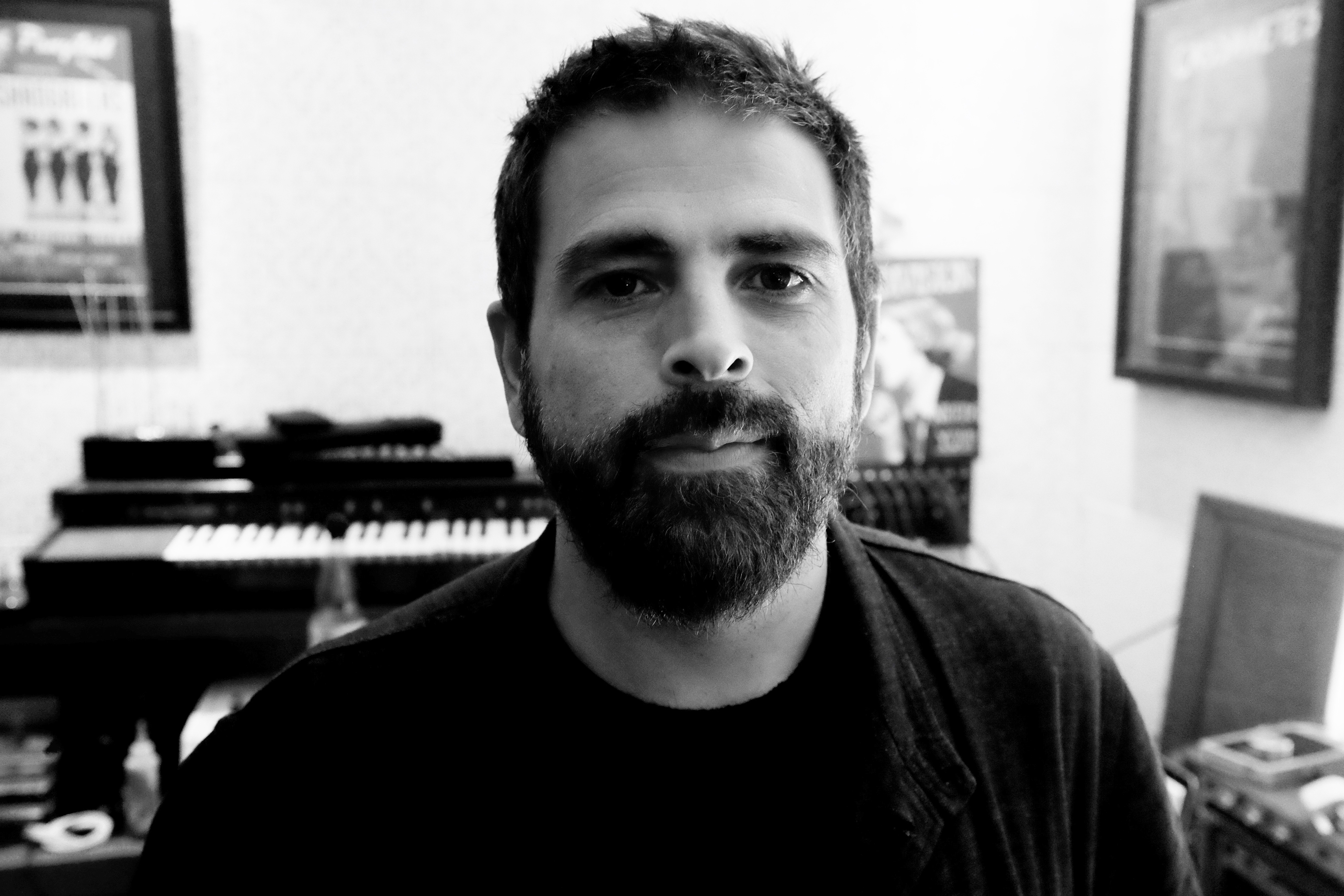
Keyboardist and producer Keefus Ciancia (2016) influenced Ndegéocello's sound for the album.

For the song "Slaughter", Ndegéocello tried to weave together sonic influences from the producers Trevor Horn and RZA, as well as the bands Yes, Sade, and The Human League: "That's what I tried to achieve in this particular recording: some sonic tapestries that people, even if they're not listening to the lyrics, could just feel or hear, or just have a deep, inner dialogue with." She covered Ready for the World's 1986 song "Love You Down", deconstructing it into what Village Voice critic Eugene Holley Jr. described as "a stripper's classic". Songs such as "Mass Transit" and "White Girl" featured Ndegéocello's characteristic ska and reggae influenced basslines; Holley argued that Caribbean riddims and country-rock guitar grooves underpinned the music, serving as a backdrop for Ndegéocello's contralto singing throughout Devil's Halo. In the opinion of Ed Potton from The Times, her voice "resided somewhere between Sade and PJ Harvey".

== Themes ==
I love the myth of the devil: the fallen angel who became jealous. So the symbolism of the Devil's Halo for me is that there are gray areas in music and life. I'm a songwriter, and I just go and write about the people in my life, and where I've come to at this point in my life—from making records at 22 to being 41. I've seen other things, met all kinds of people, and had all kinds of experiences.

— Meshell Ndegéocello

The main theme of Devil's Halo was identified by City Pages critic Rick Mason as the treachery of love and its bitter effects. According to Holley, the songs brimmed with "spiritual complexity and ambiguity". In Jurek's opinion, "romance, substance abuse, and one woman speaking candidly to another are themes in this musical meditation on bliss, lust, loneliness, and emotional wreckage". musicOMH journalist Andrew Burgess described the record's content as "achingly sensual and brutally violent", while Seattle Weekly's Saby Reyes-Kulkami said "isolation—even more than the sexual charge the songs exude—serves as the linchpin that pushes her narrators to strive for connection in the first place." While the music covered styles ranging from pop and "progressive quiet storm" to "light" avant-garde, The Huffington Post's Mike Ragogna believed the subject matter had a more "low key/high concept" quality expressed through terse lyrics, sonic experiments, and character studies such as "Lola" and "White Girl".

"Lola" was written as a critique of mainstream culture's treatment of romantic love and heartbreak. "A wife’s just a whore with a diamond ring", Ndegéocello's sang. She drew inspiration from matchmaking reality television shows that presented love as a "really clear exchange". "I hear young women going 'well if he can buy me something'", Ndegéocello explained. "That song—'Put It in the Bag'—which is based on 'can you buy me some things?' And then the male counterpart, all he can really talk about is sex and if the woman can cook. And it’s funny to me. That you're no more than a whore, you just have a wedding ring." "Bright Shiny Morning" was titled after the book of the same name by James Frey. Ndegéocello wrote the song after reflecting on her past lies and misrepresentations, particularly those she made in an attempt to be accepted in the music industry. "People change themselves", she said. "Almost in the sense of creating mental anguish in order to make other people happy and to obtain celebrity and fame. That's why the lyric is 'you do anything.' Some people do anything for their big dreams of sunshine."

== Release and reception ==
Professional ratings
Review scores
Source	Rating
AllMusic	4.5/5 stars
The A.V. Club	A−
The Independent	2/5 stars
Mojo	2/5 stars
The New Zealand Herald	4/5 stars
Q	4/5 stars
PopMatters	9/10
Uncut	3/5 stars
The Sunday Times	4/5 stars
The Times	4/5 stars

Devil's Halo was released by Downtown Records on October 6, 2009, to generally positive reviews from critics. At Metacritic, which assigns a normalized rating out of 100 to reviews from mainstream publications, the album received an average score of 78, based on seven reviews.

Reviewing the album for Billboard, Gary Graff said it "neatly straddles a line between challenging and accessible", featuring some of Ndegéocello's strongest compositions yet. Jurek claimed she "hasn't been so nakedly vulnerable and brazenly honest on record as she is here". Tyler Lewis of PopMatters hailed Devil's Halo as the singer-songwriter's most consistent and "emotionally potent work" since 1999's Bitter while adding that this album featured "a greater sense of perspective of life's realities". According to Q, the songs expressing frantic feelings were balanced by "unpredictable but always apposite moments of beauty". Salon journalist Heather Havrilesky said "like a world-weary muse, Ndegéocello taps into something rich and melancholy at the sludgy bottom of our hearts" while possessing a "mellow depth" in her singing. The Washington Post critic Mark Jenkins believed the music's "stripped-down approach accentuated her musical brawn". Noel Murray from The A.V. Club found the album "bracingly unpredictable and persistently enjoyable; it's an art-soul record for those who like to be challenged while they’re tapping their toes. Or vice versa".

In a less enthusiastic review, Andy Gill of The Independent believed the eclectic style on Devil's Halo sounded muddled: "The songs seem to bleed into one another, with too much pointlessly flashy playing leading to polite jazz-rock hell. One's left yearning for a hummable melody that might imprint one of these songs upon one's memory". Mojo wrote that while the lyrics to "her songs are as politically charged as ever, musically they're laboured experiments in style". Robert Christgau from MSN Music was even less receptive, rating the album a "dud", which indicated "a bad record whose details rarely merit further thought".

== Track listing ==
No.	Title	Writer(s)	Length
1.	"Slaughter"	Me'Shell Ndegéocello	2:38
2.	"Tie One On"	Ndegéocello	2:31
3.	"Lola"	Chris Bruce, Ndegéocello	3:11
4.	"Hair of the Dog"	Keefus Ciancia, Keith Ciancia, Lisa Germano, Ndegéocello	1:41
5.	"Mass Transit"	Bruce, Ndegéocello, Deantoni Parks	3:45
6.	"White Girl"	Bruce, Ndegéocello	2:42
7.	"Love You Down"	Melvin Riley	5:22
8.	"Devil's Halo"	Yuval Lion, Ndegéocello	2:22
9.	"Bright Shiny Morning"	Bruce, Eric Elterman, Ndegéocello	3:02
10.	"Blood on the Curb"	Oren Bloedow, Ndegéocello	2:39
11.	"Die Young"	Ciancia, K. Ciancia, Elterman, Ndegéocello	4:20
12.	"Crying in Your Beer"	Bloedow, Bruce, Ndegéocello	2:35

== Personnel ==
Credits are adapted from the album's liner notes.

- Oren Bloedow – vocal arrangements and vocals on "Slaughter"
- Chris Bruce – banjo, bass, guitar, production
- Keith Ciancia – keyboards, production, programming
- Eric Elterman – recording engineer
- Lisa Germano – cello on "Hair of the Dog" and "Bright Shiny Morning" (also violin)
- S. Husky Höskulds – recording engineer
- Me'Shell Ndegéocello – bass, keyboards, production, vocals on all tracks
- Deantoni Parks – drums
- Bob Power – mastering

== Charts ==
Chart (2009)	Peak position
US Billboard 200	185
US Independent Albums (Billboard)	31
US Top R&B/Hip-Hop Albums (Billboard)	31
