= Martha Reeves (album) =

Studio album by Martha Reeves
- Released: 1974
- Recorded: 1973
- Studio: Producers Workshop; Sound Labs; Crystal Sound (all in Los Angeles)
- Genre: R&B; pop; rock
- Length: 39:04
- Label: MCA
- Producer: Richard Perry

Martha Reeves chronology
Martha Reeves (1974)	The Rest of My Life (1976)

Singles from Martha Reeves
- 1. "No One There" Released: March 1973; 2. "Power of Love" Released: March 1974; 3. "Wild Night" Released: August 1974

Professional ratings
Review scores
Source	Rating
AllMusic	3.5/5 stars
Christgau's Record Guide	C+

Martha Reeves is the debut album by singer Martha Reeves, released in 1974 on the MCA label. It is her first album after her position as lead singer in Martha and the Vandellas, who disbanded two years before the album's release. The album peaked at No. 94 in Australia.

== Overview ==
In 1973, Jet magazine reported that Reeves had left Motown to start a solo career with MCA Records, and that the Vandellas disbanded. Reeves entered the studio with Richard Perry to record the album. By the time the album was released, it was a commercial failure. "No One There" peaked at No. 52 in the UK. "Power of Love" peaked at No. 76 on the Pop charts, and on No. 27 on the R&B charts. Reeves covered "Wild Night", a single by Van Morrison, and it was a minor hit on the R&B charts. It peaked at No. 74 on the R&B charts. The song also appeared in the 1991 film Thelma & Louise and was on the soundtrack.

== Track listing ==
1. Wild Night (Van Morrison) 03:28
2. You've Got Me for Company (Billy Preston; Bruce Fisher) 02:34
3. Facsimile (Leon Patillo; Martha Reeves) 03:06
4. Ain't That Peculiar (Marvin Tarplin; Robert Rogers; Smokey Robinson; Warren Moore) 03:27
5. Dixie Highway (Carole King) 03:44
6. Power of Love (Gamble & Huff; Joe Simon) 03:24
7. My Man (You Changed My Tune) (Cynthia Webb; Vini Poncia) 03:38
8. Sweet Misery (Hoyt Axton) 03:52
9. I've Got to Use My Imagination (Barry Goldberg; Gerry Goffin) 04:00
10. Storm In My Soul (John Vastano; Vini Poncia) 04:12
11. Many Rivers to Cross (Jimmy Cliff) 03:43

== Personnel ==
Adapted from liner notes.

- James Jamerson, Henry Davis, Klaus Voormann, Derrek Van Eaton, Basie Green – bass guitar
- Jim Keltner, James Gadson, Travis Fullerton – drums
- Ralph MacDonald, Richard Perry, King Errison – percussion
- Arthur Adams, Lon Van Eaton, Wah Wah Watson, Dennis Coffey, Dean Parks, Hoyt Axton, Derrek Van Eaton, Lloyd Gregory – guitar
- Danny Faragher, William Smith, Billy Preston, Lenny Lee Goldsmith – organ
- Nicky Hopkins, Russ Turner, Clarence McDonald, William Smith, Tom Hensley, Larry Nash, Joe Sample – piano
- Malcolm Cecil, Robert Margouleff – synthesizer
- Milt Holland – vibraphone
- Kenny Asher – clavinet, organ
- Bobby Keys, Steve Madaio – horns
- Clydie King, Sherlie Matthews, Jim Gilstrap, Vini Poncia, Leon Patillo, Carol Kafi – background vocals
- The Avalon Carver Community Choir – choir

== Technical ==
- Producer – Richard Perry
- Arranged By (Horns) – Trevor Lawrence (Tracks 1, 2, 4, 8, 9)
- Arranged By (Horns) – James Taylor (Tracks 6, 9)
- Arranged By (Strings) – Trevor Lawrence (Track 2)
- Conductor – James Taylor (Track 6)
- Engineer (Recording) – Andrew Berliner, Bill Schnee
- Mastered By – Doug Sax
- Mixed By – Bill Schnee
- Art Direction – David Larkham, Ed Caraeff
- Design – David Larkham
- Photography – Ed Caraeff
- Mastered At The Mastering Lab

== Charts ==
Chart (1974)	Peak position
Australia (Kent Music Report)	94

=== Singles ===
Year	Single	Chart positions			
Year	Single	US	US Soul	AUS	UK
1974	"No One There"	–	–	–	52
1974	"Power of Love"	76	27	–	–
1974	"Wild Night"	–	74	95	–
