= The World Has Made Me the Man of My Dreams =

Studio album by Me'shell Ndegeocello
- Released: August 20, 2007
- Label: Bismillah

Me'shell Ndegeocello chronology
The Spirit Music Jamia: Dance of the Infidel (2005)	The World Has Made Me the Man of My Dreams (2007)	Devil's Halo (2009)

Professional ratings
Aggregate scores
Source	Rating
Metacritic	84/100
Review scores
Source	Rating
AllMusic	4/5 stars
Entertainment Weekly	A
Paste	3.5/5 stars
PopMatters	9/10
Rolling Stone	3/5 stars
Spin	6/10
Vibe	4/5 stars

The World Has Made Me the Man of My Dreams is the seventh studio album by the American musician Meshell Ndegeocello. The album was released in August 2007. Five of the tracks were previously released on Meshell's 2006 EP, The Article 3.

In the U.S., The World Has Made Me The Man Of My Dreams peaked at #186 on the Billboard 200 Albums chart and #60 on Billboard's Top R&B Album chart.

== Track listing ==
1. "Haditha"
2. "The Sloganeer: Paradise"
3. "Evolution"
4. "Virgo"
5. "Lovely Lovely"
6. "Elliptical"
7. "Shirk"
8. "Article 3"
9. "Michelle Johnson"
10. "Headline"
11. "Solomon"
12. "Relief: A Stripper Classic

== Personnel ==
- Meshell Ndegeocello – bass, vocals
- Brandon Ross – guitar
- Mike Severson – guitar
- David Gilmore – guitar
- Doyle Bramhall II – guitar
- Hervé Sambe – guitar
- Rhamis Kent – guitar
- Pat Metheny – guitar
- Scott Mann – guitar, keyboards
- Daniel Jones – keyboards
- Jason Lindner – keyboards
- Daniel Jones – vocals, synthesizer
- Robert Glasper – piano
- Mark Kelley – bass
- Hamza Yusuf – voice
- Jack Bean – voice
- Sy Smith – vocals
- Oumou Sangare – vocals
- Thandiswa Mazwai – vocals
- Deantoni Parks – drums
- James Newton – flute
- Oliver Lake – saxophone
- George McMullen – trombone
- Graham Haynes – cornet
- Gilmar Gomes – percussion
- Davi Vieira – percussion
- Chad Royce – percussion
- Rhamis Kent – drums
