= The Spirit Music Jamia: Dance of the Infidel =

Studio album by Me'shell Ndegeocello
- Released: February 14, 2005
- Recorded: March 1–March 4, 2003
- Studios: Chung King Studios, New York City
- Genre: Jazz
- Label: Universal Music
- Producers: Bob Power, Meshell Ndegeocello

Me'shell Ndegeocello chronology
| Comfort Woman (2003) | The Spirit Music Jamia: Dance of the Infidel (2005) | The World Has Made Me the Man of My Dreams (2007) |

Professional ratings
Review scores
| Source | Rating |
|---|---|
| About.com | 2005 |
| Allmusic | 2005 |
| Billboard | (favorable) 2005 |
| New York Times | (favorable) 2005 |
| Past | (favorable) 2005 |
| PopMatters | (8/10) 2005 |

The Spirit Music Jamia: Dance of the Infidel is the sixth album by the American multi-instrumentalist Me'shell Ndegeocello, initially released in France on Universal France on February 14, 2005, and then subsequently on the Shanachie label in the United States on June 21 of the same year (see 2005 in music).

The album is Ndegeocello's first after leaving Maverick Records, her label between 1993 and 2003. The album is completely jazz-based and features a number of noted jazz musicians.

The album peaked at #4 on Billboard's Top Contemporary Jazz Albums chart in the U.S.

== Track listing ==
1. "Mu Min" – 1:54
2. "Al Falaq 13" – 11:47
3. "Aquarium" – 4:43
  - Featuring Sabina Sciubba
4. "Papillon" – 11:32
5. "Dance Of The Infidel" – 7:27
6. "The Chosen" – 6:34
  - Featuring Cassandra Wilson
7. "Luqman" – 11:55
8. "Heaven" – 6:07
  - Featuring Lalah Hathaway

== Personnel ==
- Me'shell Ndegeocello – multi-instrumentalist, arranger, producer, art direction
- Brandon Ross – guitar
- Michael Cain – piano, arranger, keyboards
- Neal Evans – piano, keyboards
- Federico Gonzalez Peña – keyboards
- Didi Gutman – keyboards, programming
- Ron Blake – horn
- Don Byron – horn
- Wallace Roney – horn
- Josh Roseman – horn
- Oran Coltrane – horn
- Oliver Lake – horn
- Kenny Garrett – horn
- Grégoire Maret – harmonica
- Chris Dave – drums
- Jack DeJohnette – drums
- Gene Lake – drums
- Dan Reiser – clay drums
- Pedro Martinez – percussion
- Yosvany Terry – percussion
- Mino Cinelu – percussion
- Lalah Hathaway – vocals
- Cassandra Wilson – vocals
- Sabina Sciubba – vocals
- Matt Garrison – bass guitar
- Dave Meshell – bass, programming
- Takuya Nakamura – programming
- Bob Power – producer, engineer, mixing
- Ari Raskin – programming, engineer, mixing
- Zeke Zima – engineer
- Emily Lazar – mastering
- William Miller – production assistant
- Brian Montgomery – assistant
- Ross Petersen – assistant
- David Swope – assistant
- Dexter Story – management
- Marsha Black – administration
- Kofi Taha – executive producer
- Jason Olaine – A&R
- Rebecca Meek – artwork, art direction, package design
