= Who Is He (And What Is He to You)? =

1972 song performed by Bill Withers

Song by Bill Withers

from the album Still Bill
- Released: May 1972
- Genre: Soul, funk
- Length: 3:12
- Label: Sussex
- Songwriters: William Withers; Stanley McKenny
- Producer: Ray Jackson

"Who Is He (And What Is He to You)?" is a track from Bill Withers' 1972 album, Still Bill. The music was written by Withers along with Stan McKenny, who wrote the lyrics. The song has also been featured on the soundtrack of Quentin Tarantino's Jackie Brown.

== Cover versions ==
"Who Is He and What Is He to You"

Single by Meshell Ndegeocello

from the album Peace Beyond Passion
- Released: 1996
- Genre: Neo soul
- Length: 4:49
- Label: Maverick
- Songwriters: Bill Withers; Stan McKenny

Meshell Ndegeocello singles chronology
| "Wild Night" (1994) | "Who Is He and What Is He to You" (1996) | "Leviticus: Faggot" (1996) |

- In 1973, R&B group Gladys Knight & the Pips recorded a cover for the song on their album, Neither One of Us.
- In 1974, R&B vocal group Creative Source had their biggest hit with the song which peaked at No. 21 on the soul chart and No. 69 on the Hot 100.
- In 1996, Valerie Carter recorded the song under the title "Who Is She (And What Is She to You)" on her third album, The Way It Is.
- In 1996, Meshell Ndegeocello recorded the song for her Peace Beyond Passion CD. Her version was her only number one on the US dance charts as a solo artist, and peaked at No. 34 on the soul chart.

== In popular culture ==
The song appeared in the action-adventure video game Grand Theft Auto IV in the in-game radio station IF99. It was also featured in a 2022 advertisement for Uber Eats.

== See also ==
- List of number-one dance singles of 1996 (U.S.)
