= If That's Your Boyfriend (He Wasn't Last Night) =

Single by Meshell Ndegeocello

from the album Plantation Lullabies
- Released: August 20, 1993
- Recorded: 1992
- Genre: Funk; hip hop; R&B; soul
- Length: 4:33
- Label: Maverick
- Songwriter(s): Meshell Ndegeocello
- Producer(s): Meshell Ndegeocello

Meshell Ndegeocello singles chronology
"Dred Loc" (1993)	"If That's Your Boyfriend (He Wasn't Last Night)" (1993)	"Wild Night" (1994)

"If That's Your Boyfriend (He Wasn't Last Night)" is a single by American recording artist Meshell Ndegeocello. It was released in 1993 on Maverick Records. It also appears on her debut album Plantation Lullabies, that was released on October 19, 1993. The critically acclaimed single reached number 73 on the US Billboard Hot 100, number 74 on the UK Singles Chart, and number 79 in Australia. Its accompanying black-and-white music video was directed by Jean-Baptiste Mondino and won an award at the 1994 Billboard Music Video Awards. The single earned Ndegeocello nominations for both Best R&B Song and Best Female R&B Vocal Performance at the 37th Grammy Awards.

The song was the basis of the Queen Pen song "Girlfriend" on her 1997 album My Melody.

== Critical reception ==
Larry Flick from Billboard magazine wrote, "The track is a banji-girl, cold-clockin' throwdown armed with a fiercely bitchy chorus and a groove that instantly sticks to the brain." He noted that it "cracks cheatin' lovers. Fueled by a chorus structured like a playground limerick, Ndegeocello vamps with an attitude that's half bitchy and half enlightening. All the while, a hard, state-of-the-charts funk/hip-hop beat chugs along; it'll juice the booty of any banj girl worth her salt."

Maria Jimenez from Music & Media said, "Her reputation precedes her and she lives up to all expectations. Me'Shell delivers the musical goods and lyrical content with a cutting story based on personal experience. She flows on the bass and her fluency in R&B, soul and the genres' descendants is apparent throughout." Stephen Dalton from NME wrote, "A smart signing by Madonna and possibly the one to break her Sire-linked Maverick imprint out of vanity label status, Me'Shell's throaty but sophisticated rap style is as hard as mahogany and as cool as liquid nitrogen. Imagine a young Grace Jones laying down feisty rhymes over Arrested Development's stroppier, jazzier beats and you're there." Colin Larkin called it a "provocative post-feminist statement" in his Encyclopedia of Popular Music.

== Music video ==
The music video for "If That's Your Boyfriend (He Wasn't Last Night)" was directed by French fashion photographer and director Jean-Baptiste Mondino and shot in black-and-white. It features Ndegeocello with her guitar, performing the song in front of a black backdrop. In between, close-ups of women of different ethnicities are appearing, lip-synching the lyrics. Ndegeocello's musicians also appears in the video. It won an award for Best New Artist Clip of the Year in the category for R&B/Urban at the 1994 Billboard Music Video Awards.

== Legacy ==
In 2017, Australian Double J ranked "If That's Your Boyfriend (He Wasn't Last Night)" number 27 in their list of "The 50 Most Overlooked Songs of the 90s". Chit Chat Von Loopin Stab wrote, "As a modern guy, I'm probably supposed to say how refreshing it was to have an empowered, talented woman brought to the fore. But, at the time, this song snaked out of my speakers scarier and sexier than anything else of that decade. Me'Shell NdegéOcello was terrifying and alluring. So dangerous. The kind of girl you never marry but you never forget. She'd snap you like a twig and set fire to your life, then, come 2am on a Saturday night, you'd still find you thumb hovering over her number in your phone tempting you to call."

== Track listing ==
1. "If That's Your Boyfriend (He Wasn't Last Night)" (Album Version)
2. "If That's Your Boyfriend (He Wasn't Last Night)" (Mad Sex Mix Extended) (Lil Louis Remix)
3. "If That's Your Boyfriend (He Wasn't Last Night)" (The Gentrified 9 Mix) (David Gamson Remix)
4. "If That's Your Boyfriend (He Wasn't Last Night)" (Existential Meditation on the Probability of You Kissing My Mind) (A-Plus Remix)
5. "If That's Your Boyfriend (He Wasn't Last Night)" (Tiramisu Mix Extended) (Lil Louis Remix)
6. "If That's Your Boyfriend (He Wasn't Last Night)" (Lil Louis Freaky Mix)

== Charts ==
Chart performance for "If That's Your Boyfriend (He Wasn't Last Night)"
Chart (1994)	Peak position
Australia (ARIA)	79
UK Singles (OCC)	74
UK Club Chart (Music Week)	55
US Billboard Hot 100	73
US Dance Singles Sales (Billboard)	18
US Hot Dance Club Play (Billboard)	20
