= Pour une Âme Souveraine: A Dedication to Nina Simone =

Studio album by Meshell Ndegeocello
- Released: 16 October 2012
- Genre: Vocal jazz
- Length: 53:37
- Label: Naïve
- Producer: Meshell Ndegeocello, Chris Bruce

Meshell Ndegeocello chronology
Weather (2011)	Pour une Âme Souveraine: A Dedication to Nina Simone (2012)	Comet, Come to Me (2014)

Professional ratings
Review scores
Source	Rating
AllMusic	4/5 stars
PopMatters	5/10 stars
Slant Magazine	4/5 stars

Pour une Âme Souveraine: A Dedication to Nina Simone is the 10th studio album by American singer Meshell Ndegeocello, released in October 2012 on Naïve label.

== Track listing ==
1. "Please Don't Let Me Be Misunderstood" (Claude Bennie Benjamin, Gloria Caldwell, Sol Marcus) – 4:08
2. "Suzanne" (Leonard Cohen) – 4:27
3. "Real Real" (Nina Simone) – 3:08
4. "House of the Rising Sun" (Josh White, Libby Reynolds Holmes) – 3:36
5. "Turn Me On" (John D. Loudermilk) – 3:08
6. "Feeling Good" (Anthony George Newley, Leslie Bricusse) – 4:10
7. "Don't Take All Night" (Benjamin, Marcus) – 3:28
8. "Nobody's Fault but Mine" (traditional) – 2:37
9. "Be My Husband" (Andrew Benjamin Stroud) – 3:31
10. "Black Is the Colour of My True Loves Hair" (traditional) – 3:53
11. "See Line Woman" (George Bass, Nina Simone) – 5:51
12. "Either Way I Lose" (Van McCoy) – 3:29
13. "To Be Young, Gifted and Black" (Nina Simone) – 3:16
14. "Four Women" (Nina Simone) – 5:02

== Personnel ==
- Meshell Ndegeocello – bass
- Chris Bruce – guitar
- Jebin Bruni – keyboards, piano
- Deantoni Parks – drums
- Toshi Reagon – vocals on "Real Real" and "House of the Rising Sun"
- Sinéad O'Connor – vocals on "Don't Take All Night"
- Lizz Wright – vocals on "Nobody's Fault but Mine"
- Valerie June – vocals on "Be My Husband"
- Tracy Wannomae – soprano saxophone and flute on "See Line Woman" and "To Be Young, Gifted and Black"
- Eric Elterman – engineer (vocals)
- Pete Min – engineer, mixing, mastering
- Hilton Als – liner notes
- Charlie Gross – photography
