= Comfort Woman (album) =

Studio album by Me'shell Ndegeocello
- Released: October 14, 2003
- Studio: Applehead Studios (Woodstock, NY)
- Genre: Soul, reggae soul
- Label: Maverick
- Producer: Me'shell Ndegeocello, Allen Cato

Me'shell Ndegeocello chronology
Cookie: The Anthropological Mixtape (2002)	Comfort Woman (2003)	The Spirit Music Jamia: Dance of the Infidel (2005)

Comfort Woman is the fifth solo album by the American singer-songwriter Me'shell Ndegeocello. It was released on October 14, 2003, on Maverick Records. The album peaked at No. 150 on the Billboard 200 list that year. It also peaked at No. 43 on Billboard's R&B Album chart. It was Ndegeocello's final record released by Maverick.

== Composition ==
=== Musical style ===
Critics compared the album's "austere" style to that of Ndegeocello's third album, Bitter (1999). Writing for Launch, critic Dan Leroy described the album as "spare, dub-influenced soul". Music journalist Jess Mayhugh termed the album's style "reggae soul". A review in Uncut called it Ndegeocello's Let's Get It On and noted the influence of both Ndegeocello's previous work and earlier Black musicians on the album. The album also drew comparison to Imagination's Body Talk (1981).

"Come Smoke My Herb" and "Fellowship" include "reggae-infused sounds". "Body" features half-whispered vocals and keyboards similar to those of Stevie Wonder. Multiple critics compared the guitars on "Liliquoi Moon" to those of Prince. Uncut referred to "Love Song #3" as a "narcotised Prince ballad". "Good Intentions", which features few lyrics, incorporates funk influences and discusses Ndegeocello's devotion to someone.

=== Lyrics ===
In contrast to some of Ndegeocello's previous albums, the lyrics of Comfort Woman are generally apolitical, focusing instead on the subject of love.

== Reception ==
=== Critical ===
Professional ratings
Aggregate scores
Source	Rating
Metacritic	70/100
Review scores
Source	Rating
AllMusic	4.5/5 stars
Blender	4/5 stars
Entertainment Weekly	B+
The Guardian	3/5 stars
Los Angeles Times	3/4 stars
LA Weekly	(favorable)
Rolling Stone	3/5 stars
Village Voice	(dud)
Vibe	3/5 stars

Upon its release, Comfort Woman received generally favorable reviews from music critics. In the November 1, 2003, issue of Billboard, the album received a "Critics' Choice" designation, signifying a recent release "highly recommended because of (its) musical merit."

=== Commercial ===
On the Billboard 200 chart dated November 1, 2003, Comfort Woman debuted and peaked at number 150. That week, it also debuted on the Top R&B/Hip-Hop Albums chart at number 43.

== Track listing ==
1. "Love Song, No. 1" (Me'shell Ndegeocello) – 4:03
2. "Come Smoke My Herb" (Ndegeocello) – 3:53
3. "Andromeda & the Milky Way" (Ndegeocello, Allen Cato) – 4:28
4. "Love Song #2" (Ndegeocello) – 3:47
5. "Body" (Ndegeocello) – 3:42
6. "Liliquoi Moon" (Ndegeocello) – 4:41
7. "Love Song #3" (Ndegeocello, Doyle Bramhall II) – 4:32
8. "Fellowship" (Ndegeocello, Bob Marley) – 3:14
9. "Good Intentions" (Ndegeocello, Chris Dave) – 3:48
10. "Thankful" (Ndegeocello) – 3:25

== Personnel ==
- Me'shell Ndegeocello – bass guitar, vocals, producer, vocal arrangement, additional instrumentation
- Allen Cato – guitar, producer, talk box, drum programming
- Oren Bloedow – guitar
- Doyle Bramhall II – guitar, soloist
- Chris Dave – drums
- Kofi Taha – executive producer
- Jeff Patrick Krasno – executive producer
- Eric Dyba – engineer
- Chris Bittner – assistant engineer
- Ari Raskin – assistant engineer
- Emily Lazar – mastering
- Bob Power – mixing
- Sasha Victory – tracking
- Flem – art direction, design
- Frank Maddocks – art direction, design
- Mark Seliger – photography
