= Leviticus: Faggot =

1996 single by Meshell Ndegeocello

- Cover art for commercial international releases

Single by Meshell Ndegeocello

from the album Peace Beyond Passion
- B-side: "Deuteronomy: Niggerman"
- Released: 1996
- Genre: Neo soul
- Length: 6:08
- Label: Maverick
- Songwriter(s): Meshell Ndegeocello
- Producer(s): David Gamson

Meshell Ndegeocello singles chronology
"Who Is He and What Is He to You" (1996)	"Leviticus: Faggot" (1996)	"Never Miss the Water" (1996)

Music video
- "Leviticus: Faggot" at VH1.com

"Leviticus: Faggot" is a song written and performed by Meshell Ndegeocello, issued as the second single from her second studio album Peace Beyond Passion. The song peaked at number 15 on the Billboard dance chart.

== Music video ==
The official music video for the song was directed by Kevin Bray. The beginning of the video depicts a young man who is thrown out of his house for being gay, and the video concludes with the man (presumably) committing suicide.

=== Controversy ===
Because of the subject matter, the use of the word "faggot" being used so prominently in the song, and presumably the same-sex relations depicted in the video, many music video stations refused to air it without edits. The Box aired the video in its entirety, while MTV aired it but omitted a clip of the male protagonist showing the razor blade he later uses to commit suicide. BET would not air the video at all, with then-music director Gregg Diggs stating that the network's decision not to air it was strictly because of the use of the word "faggot" and not because of "anything sexual". Ndegeocello declared Diggs' explanation "a crock of bull" and further stated that networks that edited the video or did not air the video missed the point that the song and video were making.

== Chart positions ==
Chart (1996)	Peak position
US Dance Music/Club Play Singles (Billboard)	15
