= Bob Power =

American record producer, audio engineer and composer (1952–2026)

- Born: April 5, 1952; Chicago, Illinois, U.S.
- Died: March 1, 2026 (aged 73)
- Occupations: Record producer; audio engineer
- Instruments: Guitar; keyboards; bass guitar; drums
- Years active: 1975–2026
- Website: www.bobpower.com

Robert Power (April 5, 1952 – March 1, 2026) was an American record producer, audio engineer, composer, arranger, performer and music educator.

Some of Power's most notable engineering credits include A Tribe Called Quest's The Low End Theory, De La Soul's De La Soul Is Dead, Erykah Badu's Baduizm, and D'Angelo's Brown Sugar.

== Early life ==
Power was born on April 5, 1952 in Chicago, moved to Rye, New York, then moved to St. Louis, Missouri. He started playing guitar as a young child after his sister got one, attended Webster College, where he studied music theory and composition and joined an R&B band called the New Direction; after college, he moved to San Francisco and immersed himself in jazz.

He also studied classical composition and conducting, alongside playing his own contemporary music. He subsequently obtained a master's degree in jazz from Lone Mountain College (since acquired by University of San Francisco) in San Francisco.

== Career ==
Power stayed in California between 1975 and 1982, scoring music for the PBS television series Over Easy and writing music for broadcast advertising. Power contributed music for advertising campaigns for companies, including AT&T, Casio, Coca-Cola, Elizabeth Arden, Hardee's, Hertz, Intel, Mercedes-Benz, and Purina, as well as The American Cancer Society (Emmy Award winner) and The United States Postal Service.

He then moved to New York City in 1982 to further his music career by playing gigs in a variety of venues, including one performance at a wedding of a member of the Bensonhurst mafia.

Power was asked by the owner of Calliope Studios to sit in as engineer of a music recording session by the group Stetsasonic. Stetsasonic thought so highly of Power's work that he continued to work with them, overseeing the breakthrough sessions for their album On Fire.

He continued his relationships with hip-hop groups thereafter, linking up with the New York City collective Native Tongues, which was a crew of hip-hop groups, including A Tribe Called Quest, Black Sheep, De La Soul, and Jungle Brothers. All of the musical groups within the collective based their music around intricately designed and complex arrangements of sampling.

His most noteworthy project as an engineer is his work on A Tribe Called Quest's sophomore album The Low End Theory, which was recorded between 1990 and 1991 and released in September 1991. Power describes his work on The Low End Theory in the following quotation:

The Low End Theory was an interesting record; in a way, it was "The Sgt. Pepper's" of hip-hop. It's a record that changed the way that people thought about putting music together. I'm not a big hip-hop historian; I just know the stuff that I worked on. Until that point, when people used samples on records, it was pretty much one loop that played throughout. With The Low End Theory, and People's Instinctive Travels to a lesser extent, Q-Tip and Ali Shaheed were at the leading edge of a new wave where people started making elaborate musical constructions out of samples from different places that would not, and in many ways could not, have been played by regular players.

— Bob Power

By the mid-1990s, Power ran a production suite at Sony Music Studios in New York. His profile continued to expand through his record production work with Me'Shell N'degéocello, the Roots, D'Angelo, and Erykah Badu. The latter saw Power get his first number 1 R&B single, "On & On", while N'degéocello's Peace Beyond Passion received a nomination for a Grammy Award as Best Engineered Album.

== Later life and death ==
Power was an Arts Professor at the Clive Davis Institute of Recorded Music at New York University's Tisch School of the Arts located in New York City.

Power died on March 1, 2026, at the age of 73.

== Discography ==
=== Production and engineering credits ===
| Year | Artist | Release | Notes |
|---|---|---|---|
| 1986 | Perfect Stranger | Love Letters / Some People Say | Single |
| 1991 | A Tribe Called Quest | The Low End Theory | Album |
| 1991 | De La Soul | De La Soul is Dead | Album |
| 1993 | A Tribe Called Quest | Midnight Marauders | Album |
| 1993 | De La Soul | Buhloone Mindstate | Album |
| 1993 | Jungle Brothers | J. Beez wit the Remedy | Single |
| 1993 | Jungle Brothers | 40 Below Trooper | Single |
| 1993 | Jungle Brothers | On the Road Again / Simple as That | Q-Tip remix |
| 1993 | Meshell Ndegeocello | Plantation Lullabies | Track: "I'm Diggin' You (Like an Old Soul Record)" |
| 1993 | Meshell Ndegeocello | Call Me | Single |
| 1993 | Meshell Ndegeocello | If That's Your Boyfriend (He Wasn't Last Night) | Track: "Two Lonely Hearts (On the Subway)" |
| 1995 | D'Angelo | Brown Sugar | Track: "Alright" |
| 1995 | Alliance Ethnik | Simple & Funky | Album |
| 1995 | Alliance Ethnik | Respect | Single |
| 1995 | Alliance Ethnik | Honesty & Jalousie (Fais Un Choix Dans La Vie) | Single |
| 1995 | Alliance Ethnik | Le Vent Tourne | Single |
| 1996 | Various artists | High School High (The Soundtrack) | Track: "Your Precious Love" |
| 1996 | China | Time! | Track: "Time" |
| 1996 | D'Angelo | "Me and Those Dreamin' Eyes of Mine" | Single |
| 1997 | Erykah Badu | Baduizm | Track: "On & On" |
| 1997 | Erykah Badu | "Tyrone" | Single |
| 1997 | Bran Van 3000 | Glee | Album |
| 1997 | Lynden David Hall | Medicine 4 My Pain | Track: "Sexy Cinderella" |
| 1998 | Lynden David Hall | "Crescent Moon" | Single |
| 1998 | Market | "M6" | Single |
| 1999 | Rahzel | Make the Music 2000 | Track: "To the Beat" |
| 1999 | Macy Gray | "I Try" | Bob Power remix |
| 1999 | Erykah Badu and D'Angelo | "Your Precious Love" | Single |
| 2000 | Lynden David Hall | The Other Side | Track: "Dead and Gone" |
| 2000 | Syleena Johnson | Chapter 1: Love, Pain & Forgiveness | Album |
| 2000 | Erykah Badu | "Bag Lady" | Single |
| 2000 | D'Angelo | "Untitled (How Does It Feel?)" | "Me and Those Dreamin' Eyes of Mine (Def Squad mix)" |
| 2001 | India.Arie | Acoustic Soul | Track: "Always in My Head" |
| 2001 | Syleena Johnson | "Hit on Me" | Single |
| 2001 | Ozomatli | Embrace the Chaos | Track: "1234" |
| 2001 | Erykah Badu | Mama's Gun | Special edition track: "Drama" |
| 2002 | Citizen Cope | Citizen Cope | Album |
| 2002 | Tre Hardson | Liberation | Track: "Watcha Do" |
| 2002 | Ozomatli | Embrace the Chaos Tour | Promotional release |
| 2002 | Blackalicious | "It's Going Down (Sit Back)" | Radio mix |
| 2003 | Rhian Benson | Gold Coast | Track: "Stealing My Peace of Mind" |
| 2003 | Rhian Benson | Spirit | EP |
| 2004 | Bonnie McKee | Trouble | Track: "January" |
| 2004 | Rhian Benson | "Say How I Feel" | featuring Slum Village and Dwele |
| 2005 | Meshell Ndegeocello | The Spirit Music Jamia: Dance of the Infidel | Track: "Mu-Min" |
| 2005 | Maktub | Say What You Mean | Album |
