= Bitter (Meshell Ndegeocello album) =

Studio album by Meshell Ndegéocello
- Released: August 24, 1999
- Studio: Mad Dog Studios (Burbank, CA); Sunset Sound Factory (Los Angeles, CA); Sear Sound (New York, NY)
- Genre: R&B; neo soul
- Length: 47:36
- Label: Maverick
- Producer: Craig Street

Meshell Ndegéocello chronology
Peace Beyond Passion (1996)	Bitter (1999)	Cookie: The Anthropological Mixtape (2002)

Bitter is the third album by Meshell Ndegeocello. It was released on August 24, 1999, on Maverick Records. The album peaked at #105 on the Billboard Top 200 in 1999. The album also peaked at number 13 on Billboard's Top Internet Albums chart and number 40 on Billboard's R&B Albums chart.

== Critical reception ==
Professional ratings
Review scores
Source	Rating
AllMusic	4/5 stars
Entertainment Weekly	A
Pitchfork	9.2/10
Robert Christgau	(3-star Honorable Mention)
Rolling Stone	3.5/5 stars
Spin	5/10

Billboard called the album "a modern masterpiece," writing that it "shines for its sonic presence as well as its inherent musical quality." The New York Times wrote that "its rhythms flow in circulatory patterns guided by Ms. Ndegeocello's bass playing; guitars, strings and her guarded vocals intertwine like brain waves." The Chicago Tribune called it "one long bittersweet downer." Vibe called Bitter the "Album of the Year." The Hartford Courant wrote that "though Bitter attempts to explore ambitious life themes about loyalty, faith, love and beauty, it instead commits the mortal sin of dullness."

== Track listing ==
1. "Adam" (Meshell Ndegéocello) – 2:24
2. "Fool of Me" (Ndegéocello, Federico González Peña) – 3:30
3. "Faithful" (Ndegéocello, David Gamson) – 4:46
4. "Satisfy" (Ndegéocello, Peña) – 4:05
5. "Bitter" (Ndegéocello) – 4:15
6. "May This Be Love" (Jimi Hendrix) – 5:17
7. "Sincerity" (Ndegéocello, Doyle Bramhall II) – 5:30
8. "Loyalty" (Ndegéocello, Allen Cato) – 4:20
9. "Beautiful" (Ndegéocello) – 2:44
10. "Eve" (David Torn, Roger Moutenot) – 1:23
11. "Wasted Time" (Ndegéocello) – 4:55
12. "Grace" (Ndegéocello) – 4:27

== Personnel ==
=== Musicians ===
(instruments are not stated in the booklet)

- Meshell Ndegéocello – vocals, electric bass, additional instruments
- Lisa Coleman – piano, keyboards
- Wendy Melvoin – guitar
- Chris Bruce – guitar, bass
- Doyle Bramhall II – guitar
- Ronny Drayton – electric guitar
- Greg Leisz – pedal steel guitar (11)
- David Torn – guitar
- Abraham Laboriel Jr. – drums, percussion
- Daniel Sadownick – percussion
- Biti Straug – background vocals
- Arif St. Michael – background vocals
- Joe Henry – vocals (11)
- Sandra Park – violin
- Sharon Yamada – violin
- Robert Rinehart – viola
- Alan Stepansky – cello
- Steve Barber – string arrangements

=== Technical ===
- Craig Street – producer
- Dusty Wakeman – engineer (Mad Dog Studios, Burbank, California)
- S. Husky Höskulds – engineer for additional recordings (Sunset Sound Factory, Los Angeles, California)
- Tom Schick – engineer for additional recordings (Sear Sound, New York)
- Elijah Bradford, Rafael Serrano, Chris Ribando, Joseph Turner – second engineers
- Roger Moutenot – mixing (Sunset Sound Factory, Los Angeles)
- Joseph Turner – mixing assistant
- Greg Calbi – mastering (Sterling Sound, New York)
- Paul Thompson – production assistant
- Kai Morrison – project coordination
- Kevin Reagan – art direction, design
- Gail Swanlund – design
- Sheryl Nields – photography
