= Dance Naked =

Studio album by John Mellencamp
- Released: June 21, 1994
- Recorded: October 1993 – February 1994
- Studios: Belmont Mall (Belmont, Indiana)
- Genre: Rock
- Length: 29:07 (original edition); 32:26 (2005 remastered expanded edition)
- Label: Mercury
- Producers: John Mellencamp; Mike Wanchic

John Mellencamp chronology
Human Wheels (1993)	Dance Naked (1994)	Mr. Happy Go Lucky (1996)

Professional ratings
Review scores
Source	Rating
AllMusic	3/5 stars
Entertainment Weekly	B
Robert Christgau	(choice cut)
Rolling Stone	4/5 stars

Dance Naked is the thirteenth studio album by American singer-songwriter John Mellencamp released on June 21, 1994. The album was released in response to the record company's accusations that Mellencamp's previous album, Human Wheels, didn't "fit the format." Mellencamp was irritated with this remark, feeling that none of his albums ever fit the format. As a result, he wrote several purposely radio-friendly songs and recorded them within the span of 14 days at his Belmont Mall recording studio in Belmont, Indiana, intending to show the lack of effort required to produce the type of album they were asking for. It is also the shortest of Mellencamp's albums, clocking in at just 29 minutes.

Although Mellencamp claims that Dance Naked was merely an easy output to give the record company what they wanted, the album was still well received and earned a Platinum certification by the RIAA. The most notable accomplishment was the largely successful single "Wild Night", a cover of the 1971 song by Van Morrison. The song featured Me'shell Ndegeocello on a duet with Mellencamp as well as the prominent bass lead. The single reached No. 3 on the Billboard Hot 100 and charted at No. 1 on the Adult Contemporary List for 8 weeks.

The album itself reached No. 13 on the Billboard 200 and produced several music videos: two versions for "Wild Night," another for the title track "Dance Naked," and unreleased videos for "L.U.V." and "Another Sunny Day 12/25."

Dance Naked was re-mastered and re-released on July 19, 2005, along with three other Mellencamp albums. The re-mastered edition includes an acoustic version of "Wild Night" as a bonus track.

Spin Magazine named Dance Naked the 20th best album of 1994.

== Background ==
"'Wild Night' has always been one of my favorite songs", Mellencamp told the Boston Globe in 1994. "The ironic thing is that young people think I wrote that song. Think about it. It's 23 years old. Even some of their parents were too young to hear it!" As for Ndegeocello's appearance, Mellencamp said: "I didn't know what I wanted to sing with her, but I just liked her spirit, so I asked her to come in. We don't use guests much. ... So when Me'Shell showed up, I said, 'Hey, let's cut that old Van Morrison song!'"

"This is as naked a rock record as you're going to hear", Mellencamp told Billboard's Jim Bessman in an April 23, 1994, story. "All the vocals are first or second takes, and half the songs don't even have bass parts. Others have just one guitar, bass, and drums, which I haven't done since American Fool. 'Hurts So Good' had one guitar, bass, and drums, and I think one tambourine."

Mellencamp says he and his bandmates "looked back at Human Wheels and said, 'How can we make it more empty?' What you get when you do that is the haunting type of feeling that you won't get with lush productions like Human Wheels and The Lonesome Jubilee, which were big-production records."

In the liner notes to his 2010 box set On the Rural Route 7609, Mellencamp said of "L.U.V.": "It's kind of a comic book song, but in a cartoonish way. It's a graphic novel song." "L.U.V" stands for "Let Us Vote."

== Track listing ==
All tracks are written by John Mellencamp, except where noted.

No.	Title	Writer(s)	Length
1.	"Dance Naked"		3:00
2.	"Brothers"		3:14
3.	"When Margaret Comes to Town"		3:20
4.	"Wild Night"	Van Morrison	3:27
5.	"L.U.V."		3:01
6.	"Another Sunny Day 12/25"	Mellencamp, George M. Green	3:02
7.	"Too Much to Think About"		3:02
8.	"The Big Jack"	Mellencamp, Green	3:23
9.	"The Breakout"	Mellencamp, Green	3:37

2005 re-issue bonus track
No.	Title	Length
10.	"Wild Night" (acoustic, featuring Meshell Ndegeocello)	3:19

== Personnel ==
- John Mellencamp – vocal, guitar
- Kenny Aronoff – drums, percussion
- Toby Myers – bass
- Mike Wanchic – guitars, organ, backing vocals
- Andy York – guitars, organ, bass, percussion
- Mike "Spud" Dupke – drums and percussion on "L.U.V."
- Lisa Germano – backing vocals on "L.U.V."
- Missy – backing vocals on "Dance Naked"
- Me'shell Ndegeocello – bass and vocals on "Wild Night" and "The Big Jack"
- Pat Peterson – backing vocals on "L.U.V."
- Jimmy Ryser – acoustic guitar on "L.U.V."
- Jay Healy – engineer, mixing

== Charts ==
=== Weekly charts ===
Weekly chart performance for Dance Naked
Chart (1994)	Peak position
Australian Albums (ARIA)	6
Canada Top Albums/CDs (RPM)	16
Swedish Albums (Sverigetopplistan)	24
Swiss Albums (Schweizer Hitparade)	32
US Billboard 200	13

=== Year-end charts ===
Year-end chart performance for Dance Naked
Chart (1994)	Position
Canada Top Albums/CDs (RPM)	88
