= Wild Night =

1971 single by Van Morrison

Single by Van Morrison

from the album Tupelo Honey
- B-side: "When That Evening Sun Goes Down"
- Released: September 1971
- Recorded: Early 1971
- Studio: Wally Heider (San Francisco, California)
- Genre: Rock; R&B; blue-eyed soul
- Length: 3:33
- Label: Warner Bros.
- Songwriter: Van Morrison
- Producers: Van Morrison; Ted Templeman

Van Morrison singles chronology
"Call Me Up in Dreamland" (1971)	"Wild Night" (1971)	"Tupelo Honey" (1972)

Audio
- "Wild Night" on YouTube

"Wild Night" is a song written by Northern Irish singer-songwriter Van Morrison and is the opening track on his fifth studio album, Tupelo Honey (1971). It was released as a single in September 1971 by Warner Bros. and reached number 28 on the US Billboard Hot 100. In 2022, the song peaked at number one on the radio top 100 rock songs chart in Canada.

Morrison has continued to perform it in concerts throughout his career and it has been recorded by many artists and bands, including Martina McBride. A version recorded by John Mellencamp and Meshell Ndegeocello in 1994 peaked at numbers three and four on the Billboard Hot 100 and Cash Box Top 100 charts in the summer of that year, and reached number one in Canada for three weeks.

== Recording and composition ==
"Wild Night" was first recorded during a session with Lewis Merenstein as producer at Warners Publishing Studio in New York City in autumn 1968. The version released on Tupelo Honey was recorded in early 1971 at Wally Heider Studios in San Francisco with Ted Templeman as producer.

== Reception ==
Tom Maginnis in AllMusic describes it as: "an effusive three and a half minutes of Stax-inspired R&B, buoyed by a sweet guitar lick from Ronnie Montrose of such quality that would make Steve Cropper proud." Cash Box described the song as an "intriguing self penned composition," praising the "electrifying vocal and musical performance" Record World said that Morrison's voice is in "rare form" and that the "rock and roll flavor [is] sure to please many fans." Record World also highlighted the "weepy sax."

Reviewing Tupelo Honey in Uncut magazine, David Cavanagh wrote of "Wild Night": "Recorded live in the studio (as all Morrison's albums are), it sounds intricately layered, highly sophisticated by 2007's standards, like speeded-up Steely Dan meets Allen Toussaint. It's fluid but meticulous; ultra-rehearsed but effortless. It promises a party to come."

"Wild Night" as originally recorded by Morrison was rated at No. 747 on Dave Marsh's 1989 book, The Heart of Rock and Soul, The 1001 Greatest Singles Ever.

== Other releases ==
"Wild Night" has remained a popular tune performed by Morrison at many of his concerts from 1970 to 2009. It featured as one of the closing songs during his appearance as the first day headline act at the Austin City Limits Music Festival in September 2006. It was included in the Limited Edition Album, Live at Austin City Limits Festival recorded from the performance. The song was used on the soundtrack of the movie Twenty Four Seven and as such is one of the nineteen movie hits featured on Morrison's 2007 compilation album, Van Morrison at the Movies - Soundtrack Hits. The original as remastered in 2007 is one of the hits included on the compilation album, Still on Top - The Greatest Hits. "Wild Night" was included on the 2003 (10 CD) set Ultimate Seventies Collection by Time-Life.

A live performance is also one of the songs performed on Morrison's 1980 concert disc on the Live at Montreux 1980/1974 DVD released in 2006.

== Personnel ==
- Van Morrison – rhythm guitar, vocals
- Ronnie Montrose – electric guitars
- Bill Church – bass
- Luis Gasca – trumpet
- Gary Mallaber – percussion
- John McFee – pedal steel guitar
- Rick Shlosser – drums
- Jack Schroer – alto and baritone saxophones

== Charts ==
Chart (1971)	Peak position
Belgium (Ultratop)	41
Canada Top Singles (RPM)	20
Netherlands (Single Top 100)	24
US Billboard Hot 100	28
US Cash Box Top 100	24

=== Release history ===
Region	Date	Format(s)	Label(s)	Ref.
United States	September 1971	Vinyl	Warner Bros.	
United Kingdom	19 November 1971	Vinyl	Warner Bros.	
Netherlands	November 1971	Vinyl	Warner Bros.	
West Germany	1971	Vinyl	Warner Bros.	
France	1971	Vinyl	Warner Bros.	
Portugal	1971	Vinyl	Warner Bros.	

== Martha Reeves version ==
"Wild Night"
- Italian single sleeve

Single by Martha Reeves

from the album Martha Reeves
- B-side: "Stand by Me"
- Released: 12 July 1974
- Genre: Soul; R&B
- Length: 3:28
- Label: MCA
- Songwriter: Van Morrison
- Producer: Richard Perry

Martha Reeves singles chronology
"Power of Love" (1974)	"Wild Night" (1974)	"Love Blind" (1975)

Audio
- "Wild Night" on YouTube

In 1974, American R&B and pop singer Martha Reeves recorded a version of the song for her self-titled debut solo album, Martha Reeves (1974), and was released as a single. it reached number seventy-four on the US R&B charts and at number 95 in Australia. Reeves' version of the song was featured in the 1991 film Thelma & Louise.

=== Charts ===
Chart (1974)	Peak position
Australia (ARIA)	95
US Hot R&B (Billboard)	74

=== Release history ===
Region	Date	Format(s)	Label(s)	Ref.
United Kingdom	12 July 1974	Vinyl	MCA	
United States	August 1974	Vinyl	MCA	
Australia	August 1974	Vinyl	MCA	
Italy	1974	Vinyl	MCA	
Japan	1974	Vinyl	MCA	
France	1974	Vinyl	MCA	

== John Mellencamp and Meshell Ndegeocello version ==
"Wild Night"

Single by John Mellencamp and Meshell Ndegeocello

from the album Dance Naked
- B-side: "Brothers" (live)
- Released: 10 May 1994
- Genre: Rock
- Length: 3:27
- Label: Mercury
- Songwriter: Van Morrison
- Producers: John Mellencamp; Mike Manchic

John Mellencamp singles chronology
"Baby Please Don't Go" (1994)	"Wild Night" (1994)	"Dance Naked" (1994)

Meshell Ndegeocello singles chronology
"If That's Your Boyfriend (He Wasn't Last Night)" (1993)	"Wild Night" (1994)	"Who Is He and What Is He to You" (1996)

Music videos
- "Wild Night" (Version 1) on YouTube; "Wild Night" (Version 2) on YouTube

American musicians John Mellencamp and Meshell Ndegeocello recorded a version of "Wild Night" and released it as a single in 1994 by Mercury Records. The song was included on Mellencamp's 1994 album, Dance Naked and an "acoustic" remix was released as a promotional single for radio. This version of the song reached number three on the US Billboard Hot 100 in mid-1994 and remained in the top 40 for 33 weeks. It was his final Top 10 hit on the Hot 100. In the same period, the song also reached number four on the Cash Box Top 100 and it topped the Billboard Adult Contemporary chart for eight weeks, the Canadian RPM 100 Hit Tracks chart for three weeks, and the RPM Adult Contemporary chart for one week. It sold 500,000 copies in the US. A live version by Mellencamp and Ndegeocello appears on Mellencamp's 1999 album Rough Harvest.

=== Critical reception ===
Upon the release, Larry Flick from Billboard magazine wrote, "Roots-rocker Mellencamp meets NdegéOcello from rap's new frontier? Uh-huh! And wait'll you hear it. From Me'Shell's sinewy, stinging bass playing to John's neat rhythmic attack, this rollin'-phat-funky duet is an absolutely inspired pairing. The singers' impassioned vocals flex and merge with amazing, gritty grace, and PDs have the cool option of spinning the album version (from Mellencamp's upcoming Dance Naked) or the ingenious, backstreet acoustic bonus track. Exhilarating stuff for top 40, album rock, AC, and top 40/rhythm formats, it'll make summer radios and jukeboxes "roar just like thunder." Pan-European magazine Music & Media commented, "R.O.C.K. in the USA! Mellencamp is back doing what he's best at, three-chord rockers full of Americana. Assisted by Me'Shell Ndegeocello on bass and vocals, he's top five Stateside."

=== Music videos ===
Two music videos were filmed for "Wild Night". The first music video for "Wild Night" features Mellencamp, his backing band, and Ndegeocello performing the song in a hall and basement, and continues throughout the video.

Another video for "Wild Night" was filmed, it begins when a cab driver (portrayed by American model Shana Zadrick) turns on the radio, the song comes on, gets dressed for work (matching with the opening lyrics) and drives around her various fares (with passengers such as a filmmaker, driving past a place with a sign that reads "60s-70s Dance Hits", possibly a reference to the original or Reeves's version, Mellencamp's then-drummer Kenny Aronoff, a newlywed couple, a man and his dogs, a surfer, and many more) intercut with scenes from the first video, with a few minor differences. Dick Miller also makes an appearance.

=== Charts ===
==== Weekly charts ====
Chart (1994–1995)	Peak position
Australia (ARIA)	18
Canada Retail Singles (The Record)	3
Canada Top Singles (RPM)	1
Canada Adult Contemporary (RPM)	1
Europe (Eurochart Hot 100)	82
Europe (European Hit Radio)	18
Germany (GfK)	55
Iceland (Íslenski Listinn Topp 40)	7
Scottish Singles Sales (Official Charts)	24
UK Singles (Official Charts)	34
UK Airplay (Music Week)	20
US Billboard Hot 100	3
US Adult Contemporary (Billboard)	1
US Adult Pop Airplay (Billboard)	30
US Mainstream Rock Airplay (Billboard)	17
US Pop Airplay (Billboard)	2
US Cash Box Top 100	4

==== Year-end charts ====
Chart (1994)	Position
Canada Top Singles (RPM)	6
Canada Adult Contemporary (RPM)	13
Iceland (Íslenski Listinn Topp 40)	83
US Billboard Hot 100	15
US Adult Contemporary (Billboard)	10
US Album Rock Tracks (Billboard)	40
US Cash Box Top 100	11

Chart (1995)	Position
US Adult Contemporary (Billboard)	36

=== Sales ===
Region	Certification	Certified units/sales
United States	—	500,000

=== Release history ===
Region	Date	Format(s)	Label(s)	Ref.
United States	10 May 1994	—N/a	Mercury	
Australia	20 June 1994	CD1; cassette	Mercury	
Australia	1 August 1994	CD2	Mercury	
Japan	24 September 1994	CD	Mercury	
