= Peace Beyond Passion =

Studio album by Me'shell Ndegeocello
- Released: June 25, 1996
- Recorded: 1995–1996
- Studio: Alpha Studios, Conway Studios, David Gamson Studios, Ocean Way, RPM Studios, The Sound Factory
- Genre: Soul; R&B
- Length: 59:10
- Label: Maverick
- Producer: David Gamson

Me'shell Ndegeocello chronology
Plantation Lullabies (1993)	Peace Beyond Passion (1996)	Bitter (1999)

Singles from Peace Beyond Passion
- 1. "Leviticus: Faggot" Released: June 1996; 2. "Who Is He and What Is He to You" Released: November 1996; 3. "Stay" Released: February 1997

Professional ratings
Review scores
Source	Rating
AllMusic	4.5/5 stars
Entertainment Weekly	C+
The Guardian	5/5 stars
Los Angeles Times	4/4 stars
Muzik	5/5 stars
NME	6/10
Q	3/5 stars
Rolling Stone	4/5 stars
The Rolling Stone Album Guide	3.5/5 stars
The Village Voice	B+

Peace Beyond Passion is the second studio album by American musician Me'shell Ndegeocello, released on June 25, 1996, on Maverick Records. The album peaked at No. 63 on the Billboard 200 albums chart and No. 15 on the Top R&B Albums chart in 1996. It went on to become Ndegeocello's most commercially successful album. Widely acclaimed at the time of its release, the album received numerous awards and accolades including a nomination for the Grammy Award for Best R&B Album at the 39th Grammy Awards in 1997.

The first single, "Leviticus: Faggot" peaked at No. 15 on the Billboard Dance Music/Club Play chart in 1996. The second single, a cover of "Who Is He (And What Is He to You)?" by Bill Withers, reached No. 1 on the Billboard Dance Music/Club Play chart in November 1996 and No. 34 on the R&B singles chart. The album's third single, a remix of the ballad "Stay", peaked at No. 15 on the Dance Music/Club Play chart and No. 67 on the R&B singles chart.

The album was released on vinyl for the first time on June 12, 2021, as part of Record Store Day.

== Track listing ==
All songs written by Me'shell Ndegéocello, except where noted.

1. "The Womb" – 1:25
2. "The Way" – 4:58
3. "Deuteronomy: Niggerman" – 4:01
4. "Ecclesiastes: Free My Heart" (Ndegéocello, Torri Ruffin) – 5:22
5. "Leviticus: Faggot" – 6:08
6. "Mary Magdalene" – 5:51
7. "God Shiva" (Ndegéocello, Wendy Melvoin) – 4:09
8. "Who Is He and What Is He to You" (Bill Withers, Stan McKinney) – 4:49
9. "Stay" – 4:30
10. "Bittersweet" – 5:17
11. "A Tear and a Smile" – 3:49
12. "Make Me Wanna Holler" (Ndegéocello, Federico González Peña, Melvin Ragin, Marvin Gaye, James Nyx) – 8:51

== Personnel ==
- Me'Shell Ndegéocello – bass guitar, percussion (#1), drum programming (#2, 11), lead guitar (#5), and all other instruments (#1–11)
- David Gamson – drum programming (#1–3, 9–11), drums and atmosphere (#6)
- Wah Wah Watson – guitar (#1), "wah guitar" (#5, 8, 12), acoustic guitar (#8)
- Wendy Melvoin – guitar (#2, 7, 10), guitar arrangement (#2, 7), acoustic guitar (#6)
- David Fiuczynski – guitar solo (#4, 7)
- Allen Cato – guitar (#4)
- Billy Preston – organ (#3, 8, 11)
- Federico González Peña – Fender Rhodes piano (#4, 5, 12), percussion (#1)
- Joshua Redman – saxophones (#2, 3, 6, 10)
- Bennie Maupin – bass clarinet (#3)
- Oliver Gene Lake – drums (#1, 3–5, 8, 10, 12)
- Luis Conte – percussion (#3–5, 7, 10, 12)
- Daniel Sadownick – percussion (#1)

Arranged by David Gamson and Me'Shell Ndegéocello
Vocals arranged by David Gamson
String arrangements for tracks #5, 8 an 11 by Paul Riser

Production

- Produced by David Gamson
- Recording engineer – Rail Jon Rogut
- Additional engineering – David Gamson and Charles Nasser
- Recording engineer for track #4 – Mike Krowiak, assisted by Suzanne Dyer
- Mixing – Bob Power
- Mastering – Tom Coyne
- Gregory-Trevor Gilmer – art direction
- Guzman (Constance Hansen & Russell Peacock) – photography

== Charts ==
Chart performance for Peace Beyond Passion
Chart (1996)	Peak position
Australian Albums (ARIA)	30
New Zealand Albums (RMNZ)	32
Swedish Albums (Sverigetopplistan)	56
Swiss Albums (Schweizer Hitparade)	46
UK Albums (OCC)	100
US Billboard 200	63
US Top R&B/Hip-Hop Albums (Billboard)	15
