= Plantation Lullabies =

Studio album by Me'Shell NdegéOcello
- Released: October 1993
- Genres: Soul; R&B; neo soul; alternative hip-hop; psychedelic soul
- Length: 53:10
- Label: Maverick
- Producers: David Gamson; André Betts; Bob Power; Me'shell NdegéOcello

Me'Shell NdegéOcello chronology
Plantation Lullabies (1993)	Peace Beyond Passion (1996)

Singles from Plantation Lullabies
- 1. "Dred Loc" Released: 1993; 2. "If That's Your Boyfriend (He Wasn't Last Night)" Released: August 20, 1993; 3. "Outside Your Door" Released: 1993; 4. "Call Me" Released: May 5, 1994

Plantation Lullabies is the debut studio album by American singer-songwriter and bassist Me'shell NdegéOcello. It was released by Maverick Records in October 1993 to widespread critical acclaim and has since been viewed as a landmark neo soul record.

== Music and lyrics ==
NdegéOcello recorded Plantation Lullabies after being one of the first artists to sign with Madonna's Maverick label. She worked with co-producer and multi-instrumentalist David Gamson on much of the record. NdegéOcello was also accompanied in the recording sessions by backing players such as saxophonist Joshua Redman and guitarist Wah Wah Watson. Her music incorporated hip hop, funk, soul, and jazz elements; NdegéOcello was a fan of Prince, Miles Davis, A Tribe Called Quest, Sly Stone, and Parliament. In her songwriting, NdegéOcello explored themes of sexuality, gender, Black pride, and White racism from a perspective she described as Afrocentric.

== Reception and legacy ==
Professional ratings
Review scores
Source	Rating
AllMusic	4/5 stars
Chicago Tribune	3/4 stars
Christgau's Consumer Guide	(2-star Honorable Mention)
The Encyclopedia of Popular Music	4/5 stars
Entertainment Weekly	B+
Rolling Stone	3.5/5 stars
The Rolling Stone Album Guide	4/5 stars
Slant Magazine	4/5 stars

Plantation Lullabies received widespread acclaim from contemporary critics. Rolling Stone was impressed by NdegéOcello's "mellow, majestic cool" style and "confident, intelligent sexuality", finding it "more potent than any crotch-grabbing shtick". Vibe journalist Christian Wright applauded her for fluidly "juxtaposing sound and sensibility that prevents bleeding-heart sentimentality" on an album that "explores the black condition with an intricate, seductive sound". Fellow Vibe critic Greg Tate hailed it as "the future of the funk" and "the Next Wave in Soul Music", while Brian Keizer of Spin deemed it "the kind of deep soul we need in this decade of disintegration", writing that NdegéOcello explores "the wage-slave pits, projects, and reservations of the present-day Pan-African world" with anger, nihilism, and on the romantic ballads, the "sublime grace" of Stevie Wonder. Entertainment Weekly was somewhat less enthusiastic, finding some of the singer's lyrics clichéd, the music overly fashionable, and her voice derivative of proto-rap performers such as Gil Scott-Heron, although the magazine said NdegéOcello "delivers her cool cocktail talk with a winning bluesy resignation". The Washington Post deemed the album "one of the year's most intriguing and often unsettling pop releases." At the end of 1993, Plantation Lullabies appeared on numerous top-10 lists and was voted the year's 27th best album in the Pazz & Jop, an annual poll of American critics nationwide, published by The Village Voice.

Although the album had been acclaimed by music journalists, others criticized NdegéOcello's unapologetic lyrics on songs dealing with race, gender relations, and her own sexuality. A few songs from the album led some to charge her with being racist, which NdegéOcello denied; the lyrics of "Shoot'n Up and Gett'n High" held a racist society responsible for the drug addiction and death of its subject while declaring "the white man shall forever sleep with one eye open". Some African-American critics were angered by the singer's depiction of Black men in "Soul on Ice", which accused them of embracing "white racist standards of beauty" while derisively asking if they date White woman because they "go better with the Brooks Brothers suit?". Ndegeocello was also criticized by some feminists for her boasts of sexual competition on "If That's Your Boyfriend (He Wasn't Last Night)". In response to the criticism, she told the Los Angeles Times in 1994:

"I'm not a feminist, not at all. Feminism is a white concept for white, middle-class women who want to have the same opportunities as their white, male counterparts. We can fight our men, or we can fight the system. I'm not going to fight my brothers; I'm going to try to stand beside them. I try to support my brothers on many terms; I cannot talk bad about them--I refuse, I refuse to. I just hope they turn around and give me the same respect, that's all. A lot of women take issue with what I have to say. To me, an issue is all the women--black and white--who are on welfare. To me, an issue is incorporating the men, who are in control of the patriarchy, into how we feel. If we separate them, they'll never know."

According to NdegéOcello, she was reprimanded by the executives at Maverick for her "outspokenness". Buddy Seigal wrote at the time that "perhaps because of the controversial nature of her work, radio has been slow to add Plantation Lullabies to its playlists". The album charted at number 166 on the Billboard Top 200 in 1994, while the single "If That's Your Boyfriend (He Wasn't Last Night)" was a modest hit, reaching number 73 on the Hot 100. At the end of the year, Plantation Lullabies received a nomination for a 1995 Grammy Award in the category of Best R&B Album; "If That's Your Boyfriend" was nominated for Best Female R&B Vocal Performance and Best R&B Song.

Plantation Lullabies has since been credited as the beginning of the neo soul genre; it was "arguably the first shot in the so-called 'neo-soul' movement", according to Renee Graham of The Boston Globe. In 2002, the album was named one of Vibe's nine "essential black rock recordings". Geoff Himes reflected on the record in The Rolling Stone Album Guide (2004): "Virtually a Prince-like one-person production, it bristled with irresistible hooks -- rhythmic, melodic, and verbal ('I'm digging you like an old soul record'). [NdegéOcello] celebrated African-American culture, but she also criticized its self-betrayals in the form of addiction and misogyny." "NdegéOcello injected hip-hop with the adrenaline of Alternative, organic soul humming with the politics of sex and 'black-on-black love'", Sal Cinquemani wrote in Slant Magazine, calling Plantation Lullabies "the quintessential hip-hop album, mixing the soul of Sly Stone and the funk of James Brown with the pop sensibilities of Prince and the grace of Lena Horne". AllMusic's Michael Gallucci said that in spite of NdegéOcello's occasionally derivative "funky soul" and identity politics, most of the album was "as boundary-busting and as affecting as '90s R&B gets". Robert Christgau remained relatively unimpressed, citing "I'm Diggin' You" and "Picture Show" as highlights while writing, "deprived of womanist rap, we settle for strong-woman singsong".

== Track listing ==
1. "Plantation Lullabies" – 1:31
2. "I'm Diggin You (Like an Old Soul Record)" – 4:25
3. "If That's Your Boyfriend (He Wasn't Last Night)" – 4:31
4. "Shoot'n Up and Gett'n High" – 4:14
5. "Dred Loc" – 4:05
6. Untitled – 1:41
7. "Step into the Projects" – 3:54
8. "Soul on Ice" – 5:08
9. "Call Me" – 4:45
10. "Outside Your Door" – 5:08
11. "Picture Show" – 4:38
12. "Sweet Love" – 4:54
13. "Two Lonely Hearts (On the Subway)" – 4:16

== Personnel ==
=== Musicians ===
- Me'shell NdegéOcello – vocals, bass guitar, additional instruments
- David Gamson – drums
- David "Fuze" Fiuczynski – guitar (on track 1), acoustic guitar (8)
- Wah-Wah Watson – guitar (4, 9, 11)
- Joshua Redman – Tenor saxophone (7, 8, 11)
- Geri Allen – piano (7)
- Bobby Lyle – piano solo (9)
- James "Sleepy Keys" Preston – piano (5)
- André Betts – drum programming (5)
- Luis Conté – congas (4, 7, 9–12)
- Bill Summers – quíca, hands (7), shekeré (11)
- Byron Jackson – background vocals (12)
- DJ Premier – "turntable interpretations" (13)

=== Production ===
- David Gamson and Me'shell NdegéOcello – producer (2, 4, 6–12)
- Bob Power and Me'shell NdegéOcello – producer (1, 13)
- André Betts – producer (3, 5)
- Bob Power – mixer
- Mic Murphy – additional engineering (5)
- George Karas – mixer (3, 5)
- Tom Coyne – mastering
- Bill Toles – executive producer
- Julie Larson – A&R coordinator

== Singles ==
- Dred Loc

US 12" single (1993)  0-41039
1. Dred Loc
2. Dred Loc (Skins I'm In Remix)
3. Dred Loc (Sly N Robbie Remix)
4. Dred Loc (Skins I'm In Instrumental)
5. Dred Loc (Sly N Robbie Instrumental)

- If That's Your Boyfriend (He Wasn't Last Night)
- Outside Your Door

US 12" promo (1993)  PRO-A-6852
1. Outside Your Door (Edit)  4.23
2. Outside Your Door  5.07
3. Outside Your Door (Remix)  5.05

US CD promo (1993)  PRO-CD-6852-R
1. Outside Your Door (Edit)  4.23
2. Outside Your Door (Remix)  5.05
3. Outside Your Door  5.07

- Call Me

UK 12" single (1993)  WO244T

UK CD single (1994)  WO244CD
1. Call Me (Master Mix)
2. Call Me
3. If That's Your Boyfriend (He Wasn't Last Night) (Cool R&B Extended Mix)

== Charts ==
Chart performance for Plantation Lullabies
Chart (1993–1994)	Peak position
Australian Albums (ARIA)	100
US Billboard 200	166
US Top R&B/Hip-Hop Albums (Billboard)	35
