= Weather (Meshell Ndegeocello album) =

Studio album by Meshell Ndegeocello
- Released: November 15, 2011
- Genre: Alternative rock
- Length: 47:33
- Label: Naïve
- Producer: Joe Henry; Keefus Ciancia

Meshell Ndegeocello chronology
Devil's Halo (2009)	Weather (2011)	Pour une Âme Souveraine: A Dedication to Nina Simone (2012)

Weather is the ninth studio album by American singer Meshell Ndegeocello, released on November 15, 2011, on the Naïve label.

== Critical reception ==
Professional ratings
Aggregate scores
Source	Rating
Metacritic	82/100
Review scores
Source	Rating
AllMusic	5/5 stars
Entertainment Weekly	A−
The Guardian	4/5 stars
Mojo	4/5 stars
PopMatters	8/10
Slant Magazine	4.5/5 stars
Spin	8/10
Uncut	3/5 stars

Weather received "universal acclaim" from critics. According to Metacritic, which assigns a weighted average rating out of 100 based on reviews from mainstream publications, the release achieved an average score of 82 based on 15 reviews.

In a review for AllMusic, critic reviewer Andy Kellman wrote: "The wealth of lithe, quiet backdrops played at slow tempos allows Ndegeocello, who switches between husky lower and sweet upper registers with more ease than ever, to tickle the ears. No song rocks, but a few groove." Alex McPherson of The Guardian described Weather as "deeply intimate, wholly engrossing,' going on to say "Ndegéocello's work has often been heavy with mood while elliptical of songcraft, but Weather contains her most direct material since the early 1990s." At Spin, Barry Walters explained: "After kick-starting neo-soul in the '90s, this chimerical bassist shimmied through countless genres as if to dodge and defy any tag — racial, gender, sexual, aesthetic. Here, she teams with producer Joe Henry for a somber mood piece that plays the introspection of singer-songwriter folk as meditative jazz."

=== Accolades ===
Publications' year-end list appearances for Weather
Critic/Publication	List	Rank	Ref
Slant Magazine	Slant Magazine's Top 25 Albums of 2011	13	

== Track listing ==
Weather track listing
No.	Title	Writer(s)	Length
1.	"Weather"	Meshell Ndegeocello; Benji Hughes	2:32
2.	"Objects in Mirror Are Closer Than They Appear"	Ndegeocello; Chris Bruce; Gabe Noel	2:45
3.	"Feeling for the Wall"	Ndegeocello; Joe Henry	3:28
4.	"Chance"	Ndegeocello; Bruce; Deantoni Parks	3:31
5.	"Oysters"	Hughes	2:40
6.	"Rapid Fire"	Ndegeocello; Parks; Chris Connelly	4:56
7.	"Chelsea Hotel"	Leonard Cohen	5:12
8.	"Dirty World"	Ndegeocello; Parks	3:19
9.	"A Bitter Mule"	Ndegeocello; Bruce	2:54
10.	"Crazy and Wild"	Keefus Ciancia; Hughes	4:32
11.	"La Petite Mort"	Ndegeocello; Nicci Kasper	3:31
12.	"Dead End"	Ndegeocello; Bruce; Kasper	5:11
13.	"Don't Take My Kindess for Weakness"	The Soul Children	3:03

== Personnel ==
Musicians

- Meshell Ndegeocello – bass, vocals
- Deantoni Parks – drums
- Nicci Kasper – vocals
- Chris Bruce – guitar, bass
- Keefus Ciancia – piano
- Gabe Noel – cello, bass
- Benji Hughes – piano, vocals
- Jay Bellerose – drums

Production

- Joe Henry – producer
- Ryan Freeland − engineer, mastering, mixer

== Charts ==
Chart performance for Weather
Chart (2011)	Peak position
US Top R&B/Hip-Hop Albums (Billboard)	37
