= Meshell Ndegeocello =

American musician (born 1968)

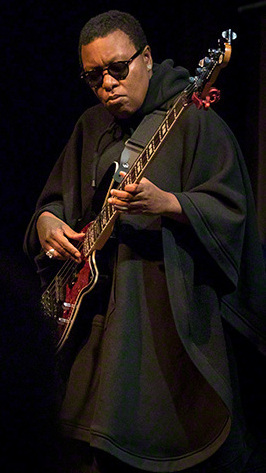
- Ndegeocello performing in 2016

Background information
- Also known as: Meshell Suhaila Bashir-Shakur; Me'Shell Ndegéocello
- Born: Michelle Lynn Johnson; August 29, 1968 (age 58); Berlin, Germany
- Origin: Washington, D.C., United States
- Genres: Progressive soul; jazz; R&B; neo-soul; art pop
- Occupations: Singer-songwriter, spoken word artist, musician
- Instruments: Vocals, bass, keyboards, drums, guitar
- Years active: 1992–present
- Labels: Maverick/Reprise/Warner Bros, Shanachie, EmArcy, Decca/Universal, Mercer Street/Downtown, Naïve, Blue Note
- Website: www.meshell.com

Meshell Ndegeocello (/mɪˈʃɛl ənˌdeɪɡeɪoʊˈtʃɛloʊ/ mish-EL ən-DAY-gay-oh-CHEL-oh; born Michelle Lynn Johnson on August 29, 1968) is an American singer-songwriter, poet, and bassist. She has gone by the name Meshell Suhaila Bashir-Shakur, which is used as a writing credit on some of her mid-career work. Her music incorporates a wide variety of influences, including funk, soul, jazz, hip-hop, reggae and rock. She has received significant critical acclaim throughout her career, being nominated for 13 Grammy Awards, and winning three. She also has been credited for helping to "spark the neo-soul movement".

== Biography ==
Ndegeocello was born Michelle Lynn Johnson in West Berlin, Germany, to US Army Sergeant Major and saxophonist father Jacques Johnson and health care worker mother Helen. She was raised in Washington, D.C., where she attended Duke Ellington School of the Arts and Oxon Hill High School.

Ndegeocello adopted her surname, which she says means "free like a bird" in Swahili. Early pressings of Plantation Lullabies were affixed with stickers to help pronounce her name. The spelling has changed in the hands of record labels a few times during her career; the correct spelling of her stage name as of 2001 is Meshell Ndegeocello.

== Career ==
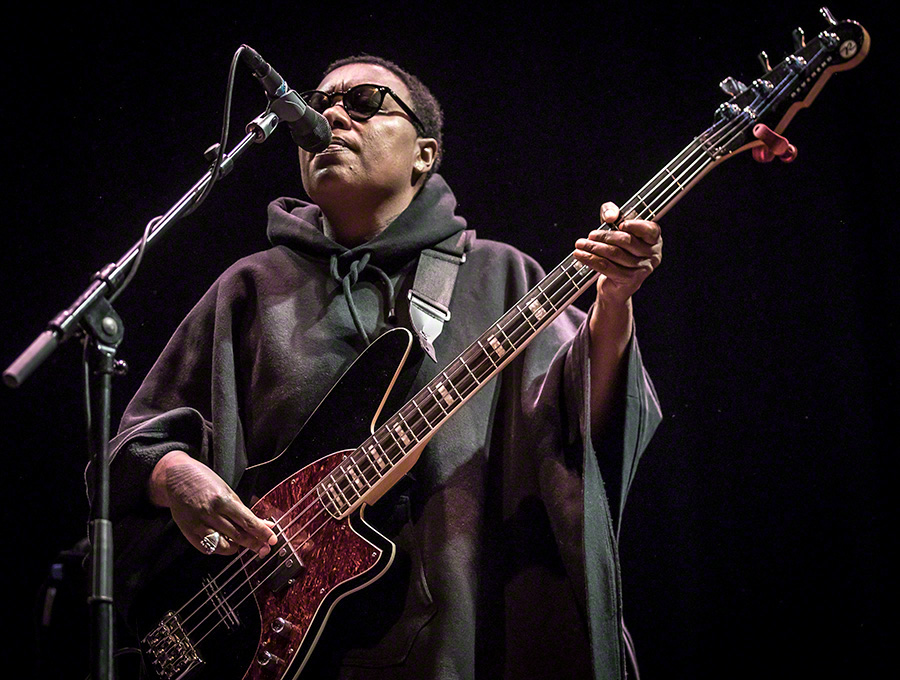
In 2016 at Cosmopolite Scene in Oslo

Ndegeocello honed her skills on the D.C. go-go circuit in the late 1980s with the bands Prophecy, Little Benny and the Masters, and Rare Essence. Going solo, she was one of the first artists to sign with Maverick Records, where she released her debut album, Plantation Lullabies. This recording presented a distinctly androgynous persona.

Her biggest hit is a duet with John Mellencamp, a cover version of Van Morrison's "Wild Night", which reached No. 3 on the Billboard charts. Her only other Billboard Hot 100 appearance has been her self-penned "If That's Your Boyfriend (He Wasn't Last Night)", which peaked at No. 73 in 1994. Also in 1994, Ndegeocello collaborated with Herbie Hancock on "Nocturnal Sunshine," a track for the Red Hot Organization's compilation album, Stolen Moments: Red Hot + Cool. The album, meant to raise awareness and funds in support of the AIDS epidemic in relation to the African American community, was heralded as "Album of the Year" by Time magazine.

She had a No. 1 dance hit in 1996 with a Bill Withers cover song called "Who Is He (And What Is He to You)?" (briefly featured in the film Jerry Maguire) as well as Dance Top 20 hits with "Earth", "Leviticus: Faggot", "Stay" and the aforementioned "If That's Your Boyfriend.. Last Night)". Ndegeocello played bass on the song "I'd Rather be Your Lover" for Madonna on her album Bedtime Stories. Ndegeocello was also tapped, at the last minute, to perform spoken word on the same song. This came after Madonna and producers decided to remove Tupac Shakur's rap (which he did while he and Madonna were dating in 1994), after he had criminal charges filed against him. Ndegeocello also performed spoken word on Chaka Khan's single "Never Miss the Water", from the album Epiphany: The Best of Chaka Khan, Vol. 1, released in 1996. The song reached No. 1 on Billboard's Dance Club Play Chart and No. 36 on the Hot R&B/Hip-Hop Singles Chart.

Her music has been featured in a number of film soundtracks including How Stella Got Her Groove Back, Lost & Delirious, Batman & Robin, Love Jones, Love & Basketball, Talk to Me, Tyler Perry's Daddy's Little Girls, The Best Man, Higher Learning, Down in the Delta, The Hurricane, Noah's Arc: Jumping the Broom, Soul Men, and Biker Boyz.

She has appeared on recordings by Basement Jaxx, Indigo Girls, Scritti Politti, and The Blind Boys of Alabama. On The Rolling Stones' 1997 album Bridges to Babylon she plays bass on the song "Saint of Me". On Alanis Morissette's 2002 album Under Rug Swept, she plays bass on the songs "So Unsexy" and "You Owe Me Nothing in Return". Also that year, she appeared on Gov’t Mule’s record The Deep End, Volume 2, playing on a cover of The Staple Singers’ song "Hammer and Nails". And in 2009, she appeared on Zap Mama's album ReCreation, playing bass on the song "African Diamond".

She can also be seen in the documentary Standing in the Shadows of Motown, singing The Miracles' "You've Really Got a Hold on Me" and The Temptations' "Cloud Nine". In the late 1990s, she toured with Lilith Fair. She also did a remake of the song "Two Doors Down" on the 2003 release Just Because I'm a Woman: Songs of Dolly Parton.

Ndegeocello was also a judge for The 2nd, 12th, 13 and the 2015 14th Annual Independent Music Awards to support independent artists' careers.

Her song "Tie One On" was chosen as the Starbucks iTunes Pick of the Week on February 23, 2010.

In 2016, she provided the theme song, "Nova", for the Oprah Winfrey-produced show Queen Sugar. She also collaborated with French-Cuban duo Ibeyi in the song "Transmission/Michaelion" for the album Ash reciting a poem by Frida Kahlo.

In December 2016, the world premiere of Ndegeocello's Can I Get a Witness? The Gospel of James Baldwin, a new theatrical music and art work, was held in Harlem, New York.

In June 2021, The Beatles Channel on Sirius XM Radio began broadcasting A Shot of Rhythm and Blues: Exploring The Beatles and Black Music, a four-part series hosted by Ndegeocello. The series explores the relationship between the English rock band the Beatles and the black musicians that inspired them.

Ndegeocello joined the Blue Note label with the debut release of her 13th studio album The Omnichord Real Book (2023). The title refers to a set of lead sheets from songs from funk, soul, gospel and more influenced by her father as if a compilation of standards like a real book in jazz repertoire.

== Activism ==
In 2002, Ndegeocello collaborated with Yerba Buena on a track featuring Ron Black for the Red Hot Organization's tribute album to Fela Kuti, Red Hot and Riot. Proceeds from the album went to various AIDS charities, per the Red Hot Organization's mission.

In June 2010, she contributed a cover of U2's "40" to the Enough Project and Downtown Records' Raise Hope for Congo compilation. Proceeds from the compilation fund efforts to make the protection and empowerment of Congo's women a priority, as well as inspire individuals around the world to raise their voice for peace in Congo.

In 2010, Ndegeocello contributed to the essay anthology It Gets Better: Coming Out, Overcoming Bullying, and Creating a Life Worth Living, edited by Dan Savage and Terry Miller in the vein of the It Gets Better Project.

== Personal life ==
Ndegeocello is bisexual and previously had a relationship with feminist author Rebecca Walker. Ndegeocello's first son was born in 1989. He provides backing vocals along with his classmates (credited as The Aeroplane Kids) on the hit song "Aeroplane" by Red Hot Chili Peppers from their 1995 album One Hot Minute. He was classmates with bassist Flea's daughter.

Since 2005, Ndegeocello has been married to Alison Riley, with whom she has a second son.

== Awards and nominations ==
Award	Year	Nominee(s)	Category	Result	Ref.
Billboard Music Video Awards	1994	"If That's Your Boyfriend (He Wasn't Last Night)"	Best R&B/Urban Clip New Artist	Won	
California Music Awards	2000	Bitter	Outstanding R&B Album	Won	
Cash Box Year-End Awards	1994	Herself	Urban Singles: Top Rap Female Artist	Nominated	
Cash Box Year-End Awards	1994	Herself	Urban Singles: Top New Rap Female Artist	Nominated	
Cash Box Year-End Awards	1994	"Wild Night"	Top Pop Single	Nominated	
GLAAD Media Awards	1997	"Leviticus: Faggot"	Outstanding Music Song	Won	
GLAAD Media Awards	2000	Bitter	Outstanding Music Artist	Nominated	
GLAAD Media Awards	2003	Cookie: The Anthropological Mixtape	Outstanding Music Artist	Nominated	
GLAAD Media Awards	2004	Comfort Woman	Outstanding Music Artist	Nominated	
Grammy Awards	1995	Plantation Lullabies	Best R&B Album	Nominated	
Grammy Awards	1995	"If That's Your Boyfriend (He Wasn't Last Night)"	Best R&B Song	Nominated	
Grammy Awards	1995	"If That's Your Boyfriend (He Wasn't Last Night)"	Best Female R&B Vocal Performance	Nominated	
Grammy Awards	1995	"Wild Night" (with John Mellencamp)	Best Pop Collaboration with Vocals	Nominated	
Grammy Awards	1997	Peace Beyond Passion	Best R&B Album	Nominated	
Grammy Awards	1997	"Never Miss the Water" (with Chaka Khan)	Best R&B Performance By A Duo Or Group With Vocals	Nominated	
Grammy Awards	2003	Cookie: The Anthropological Mixtape	Best Contemporary R&B Album	Nominated	
Grammy Awards	2006	The Spirit Music Jamia: Dance of the Infidel	Best Contemporary Jazz Album	Nominated	
Grammy Awards	2008	"Fantasy"	Best Urban/Alternative Performance	Nominated	
Grammy Awards	2019	Ventriloquism	Best Urban Contemporary Album	Nominated	
Grammy Awards	2021	"Better Than I Imagined"	Best R&B Song	Won	
Grammy Awards	2024	The Omnichord Real Book	Best Alternative Jazz Album	Won	
Grammy Awards	2025	No More Water: The Gospel of James Baldwin	Best Alternative Jazz Album	Won	
MTV Video Music Awards	1994	"If That's Your Boyfriend (He Wasn't Last Night)"	Best Female Video	Nominated	
MTV Video Music Awards	1994	"If That's Your Boyfriend (He Wasn't Last Night)"	Best New Artist	Nominated	
Soul Train Music Awards	1995	Plantation Lullabies	Best R&B/Soul Album – Female	Nominated	
Soul Train Music Awards	1997	Peace Beyond Passion	Best R&B/Soul Album – Female	Nominated	

== Discography ==
=== Albums ===
Year	Album	Label	Chart positions							
Year	Album	Label	US	US R&B	US Jazz	AUS	BEL	FRA	SWI	UK
1993	Plantation Lullabies	Maverick	166	35	—	100	—	—	—	—
1996	Peace Beyond Passion	Maverick	63	15	—	30	—	—	46	100
1999	Bitter	Maverick	105	40	—	—	—	—	—	—
2002	Cookie: The Anthropological Mixtape	Maverick	67	21	—	—	—	—	—	—
2003	Comfort Woman	Maverick	150	43	—	—	—	—	—	—
2005	The Spirit Music Jamia: Dance of the Infidel	Shanachie	—	—	9	—	—	127	—	—
2007	The World Has Made Me the Man of My Dreams	Bismillah / EmArcy	186	60	—	—	—	92	—	—
2009	Devil's Halo	Mercer Street	185	64	—	—	—	—	—	—
2011	Weather	Naïve	—	37	—	—	—	—	—	—
2012	Pour une Âme Souveraine: A Dedication to Nina Simone	Naïve	—	46	—	—	190	117	—	—
2014	Comet, Come to Me	Naïve	161	22	—	—	194	—	—	—
2018	Ventriloquism	Naïve	—	—	—	—	86	—	62	—
2023	The Omnichord Real Book	Blue Note	—	—	—	—	—	—	—	—
2024	Red Hot & Ra: The Magic City	Red Hot Org.	—	—	—	—	—	—	—	—
2024	No More Water: The Gospel of James Baldwin	Blue Note	—	—	—	—	—	—	67	—
2026	Synonym	Blue Note	—	—	—	—	113	—	68	—

=== Singles ===
Year	Title	Chart positions					Album
Year	Title	US	US R&B	US Dance	AUS	UK	Album
1993	"Dred Loc"	—	86	—	134	—	Plantation Lullabies
1993	"If That's Your Boyfriend (He Wasn't Last Night)"	73	20	23	79	74	Plantation Lullabies
1993	"Outside Your Door"	113	41	—	149	—	Plantation Lullabies
1994	"Call Me"	—	—	—	—	—	Plantation Lullabies
1994	"Wild Night" (with John Mellencamp)	3	—	—	18	34	Dance Naked (John Mellencamp)
1996	"Who Is He and What Is He to You"	—	34	1	115	80	Peace Beyond Passion
1996	"Leviticus: Faggot"	—	—	15	—	—	Peace Beyond Passion
1996	"Never Miss the Water" (with Chaka Khan)	102	36	1	—	59	Non-album single
1997	"Stay"	—	67	15	—	—	Peace Beyond Passion
1999	"Grace"	—	—	—	—	—	Bitter
2002	"Pocketbook" (featuring Missy Elliott, Tweet and Redman)	—	116	—	—	—	Cookie: The Anthropological Mixtape
2002	"Earth"	—	—	29	—	—	Cookie: The Anthropological Mixtape
2006	The Article 3 (EP)	—	—	—	—	—	Non-album singles
2006	Exit Music – Songs with Radio Heads EP 2	—	—	—	—	—	Non-album singles
2007	"Lovely Lovely"	—	—	—	—	—	The World Has Made Me the Man of My Dreams
2014	"Conviction"	—	—	—	—	—	Comet, Come to Me
2018	"Tender Love"	—	—	—	—	—	Ventriloquism
2018	"Sometimes It Snows in April"	—	—	—	—	—	Ventriloquism
2018	"Waterfalls"	—	—	—	—	—	Ventriloquism
2019	"True Vine" (featuring Justin Hicks and Kenita Miller)	—	—	—	—	—	Non-album single
2023	"Virgo"	—	—	—	—	—	The Omnichord Real Book
2023	"Vuma" (featuring Thandiswa and Joel Ross)	—	—	—	—	—	The Omnichord Real Book
2023	"The 5th Dimension" (featuring the HawtPlates)	—	—	—	—	—	The Omnichord Real Book
2023	"Clear Water" (featuring Deantoni Parks, Jeff Parker, and Sanford Biggers)	—	—	—	—	—	The Omnichord Real Book
"—" denotes a release that did not chart.

=== Other appearances ===
- 1994 – Madonna, Bedtime Stories: "I'd Rather Be Your Lover" (Maverick/Sire/Warner Bros.)
- 1994 – Stolen Moments: Red Hot + Cool: "Nocturnal Sunshine" with Herbie Hancock
- 1995 – Higher Learning (soundtrack): "Soul Searchin' (I Wanna Know If It's Mine)" (Epic)
- 1995 – Jazzmatazz, Vol. 2: The New Reality: "For You" with Guru (Chrysalis)
- 1995 – White Man's Burden: "Time Has Come Today" (Chrysalis)
- 1995 – Panther (soundtrack): "Freedom (Theme)" (Mercury)
- 1997 – Love Jones (soundtrack): "Rush Over" with Marcus Miller (Columbia)
- 1997 – Money Talks (soundtrack): "The Teaching" (Arista)
- 1997 – Batman & Robin (soundtrack): "Poison Ivy" (Warner Bros.)
- 1997 – Queen Pen, My Melody: "Girlfriend" (Interscope)
- 1998 – How Stella Got Her Groove Back (soundtrack): "Let Me Have You" (Flyte Tyme/MCA)
- 1998 – Down in the Delta (soundtrack): "My Soul Don't Dream" (Virgin)
- 1999 – Scritti Politti, Anomie & Bonhomie: "Die Alone" (Virgin)
- 1999 – The Best Man (soundtrack): "Untitled" (Sony)
- 1999 – Eric Benét, A Day in the Life: "Ghetto Girl" (Warner Bros.)
- 2000 – Love & Basketball (soundtrack): "Fool of Me" (New Line)
- 2001 - Lamb, What Sound: "Sweet" (Mercury)
- 2002 – Gov’t Mule, The Deep End, Volume 2: "Hammer & Nails" (Ato)
- 2003 – The Blind Boys of Alabama, Go Tell It on the Mountain: "Oh Come All Ye Faithful", vocals and piano (Real World)
- 2005 – Joshua Redman, Momentum: "Greasy G", bass (Nonesuch)
- 2007 – Instant Karma: The Amnesty International Campaign to Save Darfur: "Imagine" by John Lennon (Warner Bros.)
- 2007 – Talk to Me (soundtrack): "Compared to What" with Terence Blanchard (Atlantic)
- 2012 – Robert Glasper Experiment, Black Radio: "The Consequences of Jealousy"
- 2014 – Jason Moran, All Rise: A Joyful Elegy for Fats Waller: producer with Don Was, and vocals (Blue Note)
- 2020 – Pat Metheny, From This Place: "From This Place" (Nonesuch)
- 2022 – Antonio Sanchez, SHIFT (Bad Hombre Vol. II): "Comet, Come to Me" (Warner Bros.)
- 2022 – Robert Glasper, Black Radio III: "Better Than I Imagined" with H.E.R. (Lomo Vista)
- 2024 – Robert Glasper, Let Go: "Breathing Underwater" (Lomo Vista)
