= Federico González Peña =

Uruguayan-Argentine jazz pianist

Federico González Peña (born c. 5 February 1966) is a Uruguayan-Argentine jazz pianist and keyboardist. After being taught by the renowned classical pianist Antonio De Raco, he moved to the United States in 1984 to pursue his studies at the Berklee College of Music, and has since played in numerous groups. He played in the trio Gaïa with harmonica player Grégoire Maret and drummer Gene Lake. He is best known though for his work with the Marcus Miller band.
