= John Mellencamp discography =

Cataloging of published recordings by John Mellencamp

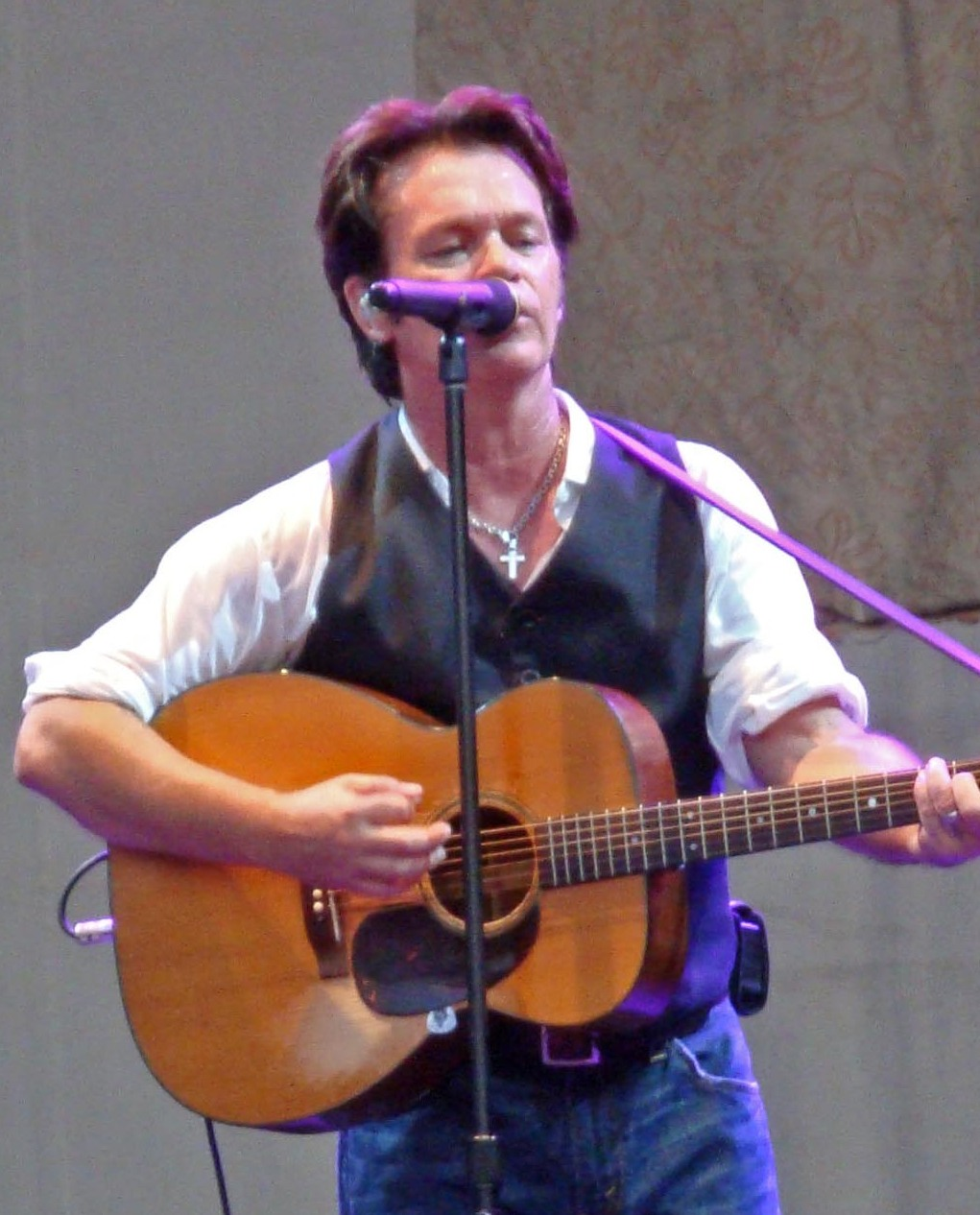
- Studio albums: 25
- Live albums: 2
- Compilation albums: 5
- Tribute albums: 1
- Singles: 71
- Music videos: 55
- Guest singles: 1

The following is a comprehensive discography of John Mellencamp, an American singer-songwriter. During Mellencamp's career in the recording industry, he has released 25 studio albums, two live albums, four compilation albums, 71 singles and 55 music videos.

Mellencamp's first album to chart on the Billboard 200 was the self-titled John Cougar album in 1979; the album was certified gold by the RIAA. Mellencamp's major commercial breakthrough came in 1982 with American Fool, which reached number one on the Billboard 200 and yielded two singles, "Hurts So Good" and "Jack & Diane", which reached number two and number one respectively on the Billboard Hot 100. American Fool would eventually sell 10 million copies worldwide (five million in the US alone). From 1983 to 1987, Mellencamp released three consecutive albums—Uh-Huh (1983), Scarecrow (1985), and The Lonesome Jubilee (1987)—which were all certified triple platinum by the RIAA. Combined, the three albums spawned sixteen singles, seven of which—"Crumblin' Down", "Pink Houses", "Lonely Ol' Night", "Small Town", "R.O.C.K. in the U.S.A.", "Paper in Fire" and "Cherry Bomb"—became top 10 hits in the US. In 1997, Mellencamp released his first-ever greatest hits collection entitled The Best That I Could Do 1978–1988.

Mellencamp has charted 28 singles on the Billboard Hot 100, including 22 hits in the Top 40, 17 in the Top 20 and 10 in the top 10. He has scored 22 albums on the Billboard 200, including 17 in the Top 20 and 11 in the Top 10. Mellencamp has sold about 30 million albums in the US and over 60 million worldwide.

== Studio albums ==
=== 1970s ===
Year	Album details	Peak chart positions			Certifications
Year	Album details	US	AUS	CAN	Certifications
1976	Chestnut Street Incident: Release date: October 1, 1976; Label: MCA	—	—	—	
1978	A Biography: Release date: March 6, 1978; Label: Riva	—	19	19	
1979	John Cougar: Release date: July 27, 1979; Label: Riva; Released as Miami in Australia	64	77	77	RIAA: Gold
"—" denotes releases that did not chart

=== 1980s ===
Year	Album details	Peak chart positions										Certifications
Year	Album details	US	AUS	CAN	GER	NL	NOR	NZ	SWE	SWI	UK	Certifications
1980	Nothin' Matters and What If It Did: Release date: September 15, 1980; Label: Riva	37	—	—	—	—	—	—	—	—	—	RIAA: Platinum
1982	American Fool: Release date: April 12, 1982; Label: Riva	1	18	1	—	—	—	—	30	—	37	RIAA: 5× Platinum; MC: 5× Platinum
1983	The Kid Inside: Release date: January 27, 1983; Label: MainMan	—	—	—	—	—	—	—	—	—	—	
1983	Uh-Huh: Release date: October 23, 1983; Label: Riva	9	57	9	—	—	—	—	24	—	92	RIAA: 3× Platinum; MC: 5× Platinum
1985	Scarecrow: Release date: July 31, 1985; Label: Riva	2	2	2	—	—	—	14	9	—	—	RIAA: 5× Platinum; ARIA: 4× Platinum; MC: 5× Platinum
1987	The Lonesome Jubilee^{[A]}: Release date: August 24, 1987; Label: Mercury	6	2	1	41	34	16	3	6	10	31	RIAA: 3× Platinum; ARIA: Platinum; MC: 6× Platinum
1989	Big Daddy: Release date: May 9, 1989; Label: Mercury	7	1	3	27	33	12	6	6	11	25	RIAA: Platinum; ARIA: Platinum; MC: 2× Platinum
"—" denotes releases that did not chart

=== 1990s ===
Year	Album details	Peak chart positions										Certifications
Year	Album details	US	AUS	CAN	FIN	GER	NL	NZ	SWE	SWI	UK	Certifications
1991	Whenever We Wanted: Release date: October 8, 1991; Label: Mercury	17	3	8	—	44	—	40	19	16	39	RIAA: Platinum; ARIA: Platinum; MC: Platinum
1993	Human Wheels: Release date: September 7, 1993; Label: Mercury	7	7	6	—	48	87	—	8	18	37	RIAA: Platinum; MC: Platinum
1994	Dance Naked: Release date: June 21, 1994; Label: Mercury	13	6	17	—	—	—	—	24	32	—	RIAA: Platinum; MC: Platinum
1996	Mr. Happy Go Lucky: Release date: September 10, 1996; Label: Mercury	9	11	11	26	53	—	36	26	37	82	RIAA: Platinum; ARIA: Gold; MC: Platinum
1998	John Mellencamp: Release date: October 6, 1998; Label: Columbia	41	41	37	—	—	—	—	—	48	108	RIAA: Gold
1999	Rough Harvest: Release date: August 17, 1999; Label: Mercury	99	131	—	—	—	—	—	—	—	—	
"—" denotes releases that did not chart

=== 2000s ===
Year	Album details	Peak chart positions						Certifications
Year	Album details	US	US Rock	AUS	GER	SWE	UK	Certifications
2001	Cuttin' Heads: Release date: October 16, 2001; Label: Columbia	15	—	131	99	—	—	RIAA: Gold
2003	Trouble No More: Release date: June 3, 2003; Label: Columbia	31	—	159	—	—	—	
2007	Freedom's Road: Release date: January 23, 2007; Label: Universal South Records	5	3	145	—	—	—	
2008	Life, Death, Love and Freedom: Release date: July 15, 2008; Label: Hear Music	7	3	21	—	53	162	
"—" denotes releases that did not chart

=== 2010s ===
Year	Album details	Peak chart positions									
Year	Album details	US	US Folk	US Rock	AUS	GER	NL	NOR	SWE	SWI	UK
2010	No Better Than This: Release date: August 17, 2010; Label: Rounder	10	—	5	83	62	93	29	33	83	138
2014	Plain Spoken: Release date: September 23, 2014; Label: Republic	18	2	5	—	84	—	—	—	58	169
2017	Sad Clowns & Hillbillies: Release date: April 28, 2017; Label: Republic	11	1	3	—	52	—	—	—	28	78
2018	Other People's Stuff: Release date: December 7, 2018; Label: Republic	7	1	1	—	—	—	—	—	70	—
"—" denotes releases that did not chart

=== 2020s ===
Year	Album details	Peak chart positions				
Year	Album details	US	US Folk	US Rock	GER	SWI
2022	Strictly a One-Eyed Jack: Release date: January 21, 2022; Label: Republic	196	5	30	24	6
2023	Orpheus Descending: Release date: June 16, 2023; Label: Republic	—	—	—	79	93

== Compilation albums ==
Year	Title	Peak chart positions						Certifications
Year	Title	US	US Rock	AUS	CAN	NZ	UK	Certifications
1997	The Collection: Release date: 1985; label: Castle	—	—	—	—	—	—	BPI: Silver
1997	The Best That I Could Do 1978–1988: Release date: November 18, 1997; label: Mercury	33	37	5	9	19	25	RIAA: 3× Platinum; ARIA: 2× Platinum; BPI: Silver; MC: Platinum
2004	Words & Music: John Mellencamp's Greatest Hits: Release date: October 19, 2004; Label: Island/UTV	13	—	93	—	—	—	RIAA: Platinum
2010	20th Century Masters – The Millennium Collection: The Best of John Mellencamp: Release date: January 4, 2010; Label: Universal	—	—	—	—	—	—	
2010	On the Rural Route 7609: Release date: June 15, 2010; Label: Island Def Jam	—	—	—	—	—	—	
"—" denotes releases that did not chart

== Live albums ==
Year	Album details
2009	Life, Death, Live and Freedom: Release date: June 23, 2009; Label: Hear Music
2014	Performs Trouble No More Live at Town Hall: Release date: July 8, 2014; Label: Mercury
2018	Plain Spoken: From the Chicago Theatre: Release date: May 11, 2018; Label: Eagle Rock
2021	The Good Samaritan Tour 2000: Release date: August 27, 2021; Label: Republic

== Singles ==
=== 1970s singles ===
Year	Single	Peak chart positions		Album
Year	Single	US	AUS	Album
1978	"I Need a Lover"	—	5	A Biography
1978	"Factory"	—	—	A Biography
1979	"Miami"	—	31	John Cougar
1979	"I Need a Lover"	28	—	John Cougar
1979	"Taxi Dancer"	—	—	John Cougar
"—" denotes releases that did not chart

=== 1980s singles ===
Year	Single	Peak chart positions										Certifications	Album
Year	Single	US	US Main	US AC	US Country	CAN	UK	IRE	AUS	NZ	GER	Certifications	Album
1980	"Small Paradise"	87	—	—	—	—	—	—	—	—	—		John Cougar
1980	"A Little Night Dancin'"	105	—	—	—	—	—	—	—	—	—		John Cougar
1980	"This Time"	27	—	—	—	—	—	—	43	—	—		Nothin' Matters and What If It Did
1981	"Ain't Even Done with the Night"	17	44	—	—	15	—	—	—	—	—		Nothin' Matters and What If It Did
1981	"Hot Night in a Cold Town"	—	—	—	—	—	—	—	—	—	—		Nothin' Matters and What If It Did
1982	"Hurts So Good"	2	1	—	—	3	—	—	5	39	—	RIAA: Gold; MC: Platinum; RMNZ: 3× Platinum	American Fool
1982	"Jack & Diane"	1	3	—	—	1	25	7	7	—	—	RIAA: Gold; BPI: Silver; MC: Platinum; RMNZ: 4× Platinum	American Fool
1982	"Thundering Hearts"	—	36	—	—	—	—	—	—	—	—		American Fool
1982	"Hand to Hold On to"	19	—	—	—	41	89	26	97	—	—		American Fool
1983	"Crumblin' Down"	9	2	—	—	9	—	—	42	—	—		Uh-huh
1983	"Pink Houses"	8	3	—	—	15	—	—	69	—	—		Uh-huh
1984	"Serious Business"	—	34	—	—	—	—	—	—	—	—		Uh-huh
1984	"Play Guitar"	—	28	—	—	—	—	—	—	—	—		Uh-huh
1984	"Authority Song"	15	15	—	—	41	—	—	93	—	—		Uh-huh
1985	"Lonely Ol' Night"	6	1	37	—	7	138	—	32	50	—		Scarecrow
1985	"Small Town"	6	2	13	—	13	53	—	80	40	—	RMNZ: Platinum	Scarecrow
1985	"Justice and Independence '85"	—	28	—	—	—	—	—	—	—	—		Scarecrow
1986	"Minutes to Memories"	—	14	—	—	—	—	—	—	—	—		Scarecrow
1986	"R.O.C.K. in the U.S.A. (A Salute to '60s Rock)"	2	6	36	—	7	67	—	18	17	—	MC: Gold	Scarecrow
1986	"Under the Boardwalk"	—	19	—	—	—	—	—	18	—	—		non-album
1986	"Rain on the Scarecrow"	21	16	—	—	—	—	—	34	—	—		Scarecrow
1986	"Rumbleseat"	28	4	—	—	—	—	—	84	—	—		Scarecrow
1987	"Paper in Fire"	9	1	—	—	3	86	—	13	16	—		The Lonesome Jubilee
1987	"Cherry Bomb"	8	1	12	—	5	—	—	20	4	—	MC: Gold; RMNZ: Platinum	The Lonesome Jubilee
1987	"Hard Times for an Honest Man"	—	10	—	—	—	—	—	—	—	—		The Lonesome Jubilee
1987	"The Real Life"	—	3	—	—	—	—	—	—	—	—		The Lonesome Jubilee
1988	"Check It Out"	14	3	—	—	10	96	—	22	18	—	MC: Gold	The Lonesome Jubilee
1988	"Rooty Toot Toot"	61	7	—	—	19	124	—	54	10	—		The Lonesome Jubilee
1988	"Rave On"	—	17	—	—	18	—	—	—	7	—		Cocktail soundtrack
1989	"Pop Singer"	15	2	—	—	1	93	—	8	1	87		Big Daddy
1989	"Jackie Brown"	48	20	31	82	23	—	—	47	30	—		Big Daddy
1989	"Martha Say"	—	8	—	—	—	—	—	—	—	—		Big Daddy
1989	"Let It Out (Let It All Hang Out)"	—	42	—	—	83	—	—	—	—	—		Big Daddy
"—" denotes releases that did not chart

=== 1990s singles ===
Year	Single	Peak chart positions									Album
Year	Single	US	US Main	US AC	US Adult	CAN	UK	AUS	NZ	GER	Album
1991	"Get a Leg Up"	14	1	—	—	4	—	21	—	—	Whenever We Wanted
1991	"Love and Happiness"	—	5	—	—	54	—	—	—	—	Whenever We Wanted
1992	"Again Tonight"	36	1	46	—	8	—	39	—	—	Whenever We Wanted
1992	"Last Chance"	—	12	—	—	73	—	—	—	—	Whenever We Wanted
1992	"Now More Than Ever"	—	3	—	—	29	76	61	—	—	Whenever We Wanted
1993	"Human Wheels"	48	2	40	—	3	—	40	—	—	Human Wheels
1993	"What If I Came Knocking"	—	1	—	—	23	—	—	—	—	Human Wheels
1993	"When Jesus Left Birmingham"	—	35	—	—	21	—	—	—	—	Human Wheels
1994	"Junior"	—	35	—	—	45	—	—	—	—	Human Wheels
1994	"Baby, Please Don't Go"	—	—	—	—	72	—	—	—	—	Blue Chips soundtrack
1994	"Wild Night" (featuring Me'Shell Ndegéocello)	3	17	1	30	1	34	18	—	55	Dance Naked
1994	"Dance Naked"	41	21	37	—	7	—	79	—	—	Dance Naked
1996	"Key West Intermezzo (I Saw You First)"	14	10	15	4	1	92	21	35	—	Mr. Happy Go Lucky
1997	"Just Another Day"	46	13	24	13	1	—	81	—	—	Mr. Happy Go Lucky
1997	"Without Expression"	—	25	—	—	14	—	—	—	—	The Best That I Could Do
1998	"Your Life Is Now"	—	15	19	23	3	—	136	—	92	John Mellencamp
1999	"I'm Not Running Anymore"	—	37	22	22	—	—	196	—	100	John Mellencamp
"—" denotes releases that did not chart

=== 2000s singles ===
Year	Single	Peak chart positions					Album
Year	Single	US	US Main	US AC	US Adult	US Country	Album
2000	"Yours Forever"	—	—	—	—	—	The Perfect Storm soundtrack
2001	"Peaceful World" (featuring India.Arie)^{[B]}	—	38	27	11	—	Cuttin' Heads
2003	"To Washington"	—	—	—	—	—	Trouble No More
2003	"Teardrops Will Fall"	—	—	—	—	—	Trouble No More
2004	"Walk Tall"	—	—	25	26	—	Words & Music
2006	"Our Country"	88	—	16	—	39	Freedom's Road
2007	"The Americans"	—	—	—	—	55	Freedom's Road
2007	"Someday"	—	—	—	—	—	Freedom's Road
2008	"My Sweet Love"	—	—	25	—	—	Life, Death, Love and Freedom
2008	"Troubled Land"	—	—	—	—	—	Life, Death, Love and Freedom
2009	"A Ride Back Home" (featuring Karen Fairchild)	—	—	—	—	—	Life, Death, Love and Freedom
"—" denotes releases that did not chart

=== 2010s and 2020s singles ===
Year	Single	Album
2010	"No Better Than This"	No Better Than This
2010	"Save Some Time to Dream"	No Better Than This
2014	"Troubled Man"	Plain Spoken
2020	"A Pawn in the White Man's Game"	non-album
2021	"Wasted Days" (featuring Bruce Springsteen)	Strictly a One-Eyed Jack
2021	"Chasing Rainbows"	Strictly a One-Eyed Jack
2022	"Did You Say Such a Thing" (featuring Bruce Springsteen)	Strictly a One-Eyed Jack
2023	"Hey God"	Orpheus Descending
2023	"The Eyes of Portland"	Orpheus Descending

== Featured singles ==
Year	Single	Artist	Peak chart positions	Album
Year	Single	Artist	US Country	Album
1992	"Sweet Suzanne"	Buzzin' Cousins	68	Falling from Grace soundtrack
2004	"What Say You"^{[C]}	Travis Tritt	21	My Honky Tonk History

== Other appearances ==
Year	Song	Album
1987	"I Saw Mommy Kissing Santa Claus"	A Very Special Christmas
1994	"Pink Houses" (live version)	The Unplugged Collection, Volume One
2007	"This Land Is Your Land"	Song of America
2009	"Pink Houses" (live version)	The Official Inaugural Celebration (DVD)

== Music videos ==
Year	Title	Director	Album
1978	"I Need a Lover"	David McMahon	A Biography
1979	"Miami"	Bruce Gowers	John Cougar
1980	"Small Paradise"	Bruce Gowers	John Cougar
1980	"This Time"	Bruce Gowers	Nothin' Matters and What If It Did
1981	"Ain't Even Done with the Night"	Bruce Gowers	Nothin' Matters and What If It Did
1982	"Hurts So Good"	Bruce Gowers	American Fool
1982	"Hand to Hold Onto"	Bruce Gowers	American Fool
1982	"Jack and Diane"	Bruce Gowers	American Fool
1983	"Crumblin' Down"	Chris Gabrin	Uh-huh
1983	"Pink Houses"	Chris Gabrin	Uh-huh
1984	"Authority Song"	Jay Dubin	Uh-huh
1985	"Lonely Ol' Night"	Jonathan Kaplan	Scarecrow
1985	"Small Town"	Jonathan Kaplan	Scarecrow
1986	"R.O.C.K. in the USA (A Salute to '60s Rock)"	John Mellencamp	Scarecrow
1986	"Rain on the Scarecrow"	Jonathan Kaplan	Scarecrow
1986	"Rumbleseat"	Faye Cummins	Scarecrow
1987	"Paper in Fire"	Jonathan Dark	The Lonesome Jubilee
1987	"Cherry Bomb"		The Lonesome Jubilee
1987	"I Saw Mommy Kissing Santa Claus"		A Very Special Christmas
1988	"Check It Out"	Jonathan Dark	The Lonesome Jubilee
1988	"Rooty Toot Toot"	Jonathan Dark	The Lonesome Jubilee
1989	"Pop Singer"	Jonathan Dark	Big Daddy
1989	"Jackie Brown"	John Mellencamp	Big Daddy
1989	"Let It Out (Let It All Hang Out)"	Wayne Maser	Big Daddy
1991	"Get a Leg Up"		Whenever We Wanted
1991	"Love and Happiness"		Whenever We Wanted
1992	"Again Tonight"	Dennis Virkler	Whenever We Wanted
1992	"Now More Than Ever"		Whenever We Wanted
1992	"Sweet Suzanne" (Buzzin' Cousins)	Marty Callner	Falling from Grace soundtrack
1993	"Human Wheels"		Human Wheels
1993	"When Jesus Left Birmingham"		Human Wheels
1994	"Baby, Please Don't Go"		Blue Chips soundtrack
1994	"Wild Night" (with Meshell Ndegeocello)		Dance Naked
1994	"Dance Naked"		Dance Naked
1996	"Key West Intermezzo (I Saw You First)"		Mr. Happy Go Lucky
1996	"Just Another Day"		Mr. Happy Go Lucky
1998	"Your Life Is Now"	Samuel Bayer	John Mellencamp
1999	"I'm Not Running Anymore"	Robert Duffy	John Mellencamp
2001	"Peaceful World" (with India.Arie)		Cuttin' Heads
2003	"To Washington"		Trouble No More
2003	"Teardrops Will Fall"		Trouble No More
2004	"What Say You" (with Travis Tritt)	Chris Lenz	My Honky Tonk History
2004	"Walk Tall"		Words & Music
2006	"Our Country"	Deaton Flanigen	Freedom's Road
2007	"The Americans"	Eric de Fino	Freedom's Road
2008	"My Sweet Love"		Life, Death, Love and Freedom
2008	"Troubled Land"		Life, Death, Love and Freedom
2009	"A Ride Back Home" (with Karen Fairchild)	Jamie Anderson	Life, Death, Love and Freedom
2010	"No Better Than This"	Ian and Kurt Markus	No Betther Than This
2014	"Troubled Man"		Plain Spoken
2017	"Easy Target"		Sad Clowns & Hillbillies
2020	"A Pawn in the White Man's Game"		non-album
2021	"Wasted Days" (with Bruce Springsteen)		Strictly a One-Eyed Jack
2023	"Hey God"		Orpheus Descending
2023	"The Eyes of Portland"		Orpheus Descending

== See also ==
- Falling from Grace
- Ghost Brothers of Darkland County

== Notes ==
- A The Lonesome Jubilee also reached number 63 on the Billboard Top Country Albums chart.
- B "Peaceful World" did not enter the Billboard Hot 100, but peaked at number 4 on the Bubbling Under Hot 100; an extension of the Hot 100 chart.
- C "What Say You" did not enter the Billboard Hot 100, but peaked at number 17 on the Bubbling Under Hot 100; an extension of the Hot 100 chart.
