= Words & Music: John Mellencamp's Greatest Hits =

2004 greatest hits album by John Mellencamp

Greatest hits album by John Mellencamp
- Released: October 19, 2004
- Recorded: 1978–2004
- Genre: Rock; heartland rock; roots rock; folk rock
- Length: 147:41
- Label: Island; UTV
- Producer: Malcolm Burn; Steve Cropper; Kenneth "Babyface" Edmonds; Don Gehman; David Leonard; John Mellencamp; Paul Mahern; John Punter; Junior Vasquez; Mike Wanchic

John Mellencamp chronology
Trouble No More (2003)	Words & Music: John Mellencamp's Greatest Hits (2004)	Freedom's Road (2007)

Professional ratings
Review scores
Source	Rating
411mania.com	(9/10)
AllMusic	4.5/5 stars
The A.V. Club	(mixed)
The Guardian	4/5 stars
Rolling Stone	4/5 stars

Words & Music: John Mellencamp's Greatest Hits is a two-disc greatest hits album by the American singer-songwriter John Mellencamp, released on October 19, 2004 on the Island and UTV Records labels.

It is a retrospective of Mellencamp's career at the time of its release, and features at least one song from each of his studio albums released between 1978's A Biography and 2003's Trouble No More. Two songs: "Walk Tall" and "Thank You", were recorded exclusively for this album. No songs are included from Mellencamp's 1976 debut album Chestnut Street Incident or 1983's The Kid Inside. Also omitted is Mellencamp's cover of "Without Expression", which was released on his previous compilation album The Best That I Could Do 1978–1988. Initial pressings of the album included a bonus DVD that contained the music videos for "Crumblin' Down", "R.O.C.K. in the U.S.A.", "Rain on the Scarecrow", "Check It Out", and "Key West Intermezzo (I Saw You First)".

AllMusic's Stephen Thomas Erlewine gave the compilation a positive review, describing it as more thorough than The Best That I Could Do 1978–1988, but criticized its non-chronological track listing. In December 2004, the album was certified Platinum by the RIAA.

== Track listing ==
All songs written by John Mellencamp, except where noted.

=== Disc one ===
1. "Walk Tall" – 3:45
  - (previously unreleased)
2. "Pink Houses" – 4:45
  - (from Uh-Huh, 1983)
3. "Lonely Ol' Night" – 3:46
  - (from Scarecrow, 1985)
4. "Jackie Brown" – 4:03
  - (from Big Daddy, 1989)
5. "Rain on the Scarecrow" (Mellencamp, George M. Green) – 3:46
  - (from Scarecrow, 1985)
6. "Love and Happiness" – 3:54
  - (from Whenever We Wanted, 1991)
7. "Check It Out" – 4:21
  - (from The Lonesome Jubilee, 1987)
8. "Peaceful World" – 4:06
  - (from Cuttin' Heads, 2001)
9. "Paper in Fire" – 3:52
  - (from The Lonesome Jubilee, 1987)
10. "Your Life Is Now" (Mellencamp, Green) – 3:59
  - (from John Mellencamp, 1998)
11. "Human Wheels" (Mellencamp, Green) – 5:36
  - (from Human Wheels, 1993)
12. "When Jesus Left Birmingham" – 5:16
  - (from Human Wheels, 1993)
13. "Authority Song" – 3:50
  - (from Uh-Huh, 1983)
14. "What If I Came Knocking" – 5:06
  - (from Human Wheels, 1993)
15. "Crumblin' Down" (Mellencamp, Green) – 3:36
  - (from Uh-Huh, 1983)
16. "Small Town" – 3:42
  - (from Scarecrow, 1985)
17. "R.O.C.K. in the U.S.A." – 2:55
  - (from Scarecrow, 1985)
18. "Cherry Bomb" – 4:49
  - (from The Lonesome Jubilee, 1987)
19. "Pop Singer" – 2:46
  - (from Big Daddy, 1989)

=== Disc two ===
1. "Thank You" – 3:38
  - (previously unreleased)
2. "Martha Say" – 3:43
  - (from Big Daddy, 1989)
3. "Key West Intermezzo (I Saw You First)" (Mellencamp, Green) – 4:54
  - (from Mr. Happy Go Lucky, 1996)
4. "Hand to Hold On to" – 3:25
  - (from American Fool, 1982)
5. "I Need a Lover" – 5:36
  - (from A Biography, 1978 & John Cougar, 1979)
6. "Hurts So Good" (Mellencamp, Green) – 3:41
  - (from American Fool, 1982)
7. "Get a Leg Up" – 3:47
  - (from Whenever We Wanted, 1991)
8. "Wild Night" (Van Morrison) – 3:28
  - (from Dance Naked, 1994)
9. "Dance Naked" – 3:01
  - (from Dance Naked, 1994)
10. "Teardrops Will Fall" (David Allard, Marion Smith) – 4:20
  - (from Trouble No More, 2003)
11. "Ain't Even Done with the Night" – 4:38
  - (from Nothin' Matters and What If It Did, 1980)
12. "Just Another Day" – 3:31
  - (from Mr. Happy Go Lucky, 1996)
13. "Jack & Diane" – 4:17
  - (from American Fool, 1982)
14. "Rumbleseat" – 2:59
  - (from Scarecrow, 1985)
15. "I'm Not Running Anymore" – 3:27
  - (from John Mellencamp, 1998)
16. "Again Tonight" – 3:18
  - (from Whenever We Wanted, 1991)
17. "This Time" – 4:20
  - (from Nothin' Matters and What If It Did, 1980)
18. "Now More Than Ever" – 3:43
  - (from Whenever We Wanted, 1991)

== Personnel on 2004 tracks ==
=== "Walk Tall" ===
- John Mellencamp – lead vocals
- Kenneth "Babyface" Edmonds – guitar, background vocals
- Reggie Hamilton – bass
- Ricky Lawson – drums
- Michael Ramos – organ
- Miriam Sturm – violin
- Andy York – guitar

=== "Thank You" ===
- John Mellencamp – lead vocals
- Kenneth "Babyface" Edmonds – guitar, background vocals
- Ricky Lawson – drums
- Michael Ramos – organ, background vocals
- Miriam Sturm – violin
- Mike Wanchic – guitar, background vocals
- Andy York – guitar, background vocals
- Jane McLeod – background vocals
- Sonja Rasmussen – background vocals
- Laurie Robert-Glug – background vocals
- Susan Swaney – background vocals

== Charts ==
2004 chart performance for Words & Music: John Mellencamp's Greatest Hits
Chart (2004)	Peak position
Australian Albums (ARIA)	93
US Billboard 200	13

2025 chart performance for Words & Music: John Mellencamp's Greatest Hits
Chart (2025)	Peak position
Greek Albums (IFPI)	2
