= The Best That I Could Do 1978–1988 =

Greatest hits album by John Mellencamp
- Released: November 18, 1997
- Recorded: 1977–1997
- Studios: Various: AIR Studios (London, England); Cherokee Studios (Los Angeles, California); Criteria Studios (Miami, Florida); TRC Studios (Indianapolis, Indiana); The Shack (Brownstown, Indiana); Belmont Mall (Nashville, Indiana)
- Genres: Rock, heartland rock
- Length: 58:51
- Label: Mercury
- Producers: John Punter; Steve Cropper; John Mellencamp; Don Gehman; Mike Wanchic
- Compiler: John Mellencamp

John Mellencamp chronology
Mr. Happy Go Lucky (1996)	The Best That I Could Do 1978–1988 (1997)	John Mellencamp (1998)

The Best That I Could Do 1978–1988 is the first greatest hits compilation album by American singer-songwriter John Mellencamp, released by Mercury Records in 1997 (see 1997 in music). It compiles Mellencamp's most popular material recorded during his first decade with Riva and Mercury Records, beginning with 1978's A Biography, up through 1987's The Lonesome Jubilee, with a new recording of Terry Reid's "Without Expression". Mellencamp picked the songs for the album and also came up with the title for the album. The album reached No. 33 on the Billboard 200. This album and Rough Harvest came about because, after leaving Mercury Records for Columbia Records, Mellencamp still owed the label two more albums.

== Reception ==
Professional ratings
Review scores
Source	Rating
AllMusic	4.5/5 stars
Robert Christgau	(1-star Honorable Mention)
Entertainment Weekly	B
The Rolling Stone Album Guide	4/5 stars

Stephen Thomas Erlewine of AllMusic.com said that the album's title was suitable and while it did not include all of Mellencamp's hits, it is a good summary of Mellencamp's "remarkably consistent" work. Robert Christgau described it as the best of John Mellencamp, which to him is not saying much. Entertainment Weekly gave the album a "B" rating, describing it as "uncomplicated but sophisticated."

== Track listing ==
=== Original release ===
All tracks are written by John Mellencamp, except where noted.

No.	Title	Original release	Length
1.	"I Need a Lover"	A Biography	5:38
2.	"Ain't Even Done with the Night"	Nothin' Matters and What If It Did	4:37
3.	"Hurts So Good" (Mellencamp, George Green)	American Fool	3:39
4.	"Jack and Diane"	American Fool	4:16
5.	"Crumblin' Down" (Mellencamp, Green)	Uh-Huh	3:36
6.	"Pink Houses"	Uh-Huh	4:45
7.	"Authority Song"	Uh-Huh	3:50
8.	"Lonely Ol' Night"	Scarecrow	3:46
9.	"Small Town"	Scarecrow	3:41
10.	"R.O.C.K. in the U.S.A."	Scarecrow	2:55
11.	"Paper in Fire"	The Lonesome Jubilee	3:53
12.	"Cherry Bomb"	The Lonesome Jubilee	4:49
13.	"Check It Out"	The Lonesome Jubilee	4:20
14.	"Without Expression" (Terry Reid)	Previously unreleased	5:06

=== Japanese edition ===
The version released in Japan features two additional songs ("Miami" and a cover of "Under the Boardwalk," tracks 2 and 15, respectively), and places "Lonely Ol' Night" before "Authority Song".

No.	Title	Original release	Length
1.	"I Need a Lover"	A Biography	5:38
2.	"Miami"	John Cougar	3:53
3.	"Ain't Even Done with the Night"	Nothin' Matters and What If It Did	4:37
4.	"Hurts So Good" (Mellencamp, George Green)	American Fool	3:39
5.	"Jack and Diane"	American Fool	4:16
6.	"Crumblin' Down" (Mellencamp, Green)	Uh-Huh	3:36
7.	"Pink Houses"	Uh-Huh	4:45
8.	"Lonely Ol' Night"	Scarecrow	3:46
9.	"Authority Song"	Uh-Huh	3:50
10.	"Small Town"	Scarecrow	3:41
11.	"R.O.C.K. in the U.S.A."	Scarecrow	2:55
12.	"Paper in Fire"	The Lonesome Jubilee	3:53
13.	"Cherry Bomb"	The Lonesome Jubilee	4:49
14.	"Check It Out"	The Lonesome Jubilee	4:20
15.	"Under the Boardwalk" (Resnick, Kenny Young)	"R.O.C.K. in the U.S.A." B-Side	3:57
16.	"Without Expression" (Terry Reid)	Previously unreleased	5:06

== Personnel ==
Adapted from the album's liner notes.

- John Mellencamp (a.k.a. "Little Bastard" on some tracks) – vocals, guitar, songwriter, producer
- Larry Crane – guitars, harmonica, background vocals, flutophone
- Tom Knowles – drums on "I Need a Lover"
- Robert "Ferd" Frank – bass, background vocals on "I Need a Lover"
- Brian Bekvar – keyboards on "I Need a Lover"
- John Punter – producer, engineer on "I Need a Lover"
- Rick Shlosser – drums on "Ain't Even Done with the Night"
- Mike Wanchic – guitars, background vocals; producer on "Without Expression"
- Kenny Aronoff – vibes on "Ain't Even Done with the Night", drums, background vocals, hammer dulcimer
- Eric Rosser – keyboards
- Steve Cropper – producer on "Ain't Even Done with the Night"
- Bruce Robb – engineer on "Ain't Even Done with the Night"
- Dee Robb – engineer on "Ain't Even Done with the Night"
- George "Chocolate" Perry – bass on "Hurts So Good"
- Dave Parman – background vocals on "Hurts So Good"
- Don Gehman – producer/engineer on "Hurts So Good" thru "Check It Out"
- George Tutko – engineer on "Hurts So Good"
- Mick Ronson – guitar and background vocals on "Jack and Diane"
- Toby Myers – bass, background vocals
- Carroll Sue Hill – keyboards, background vocals
- Greg Edward – engineer
- David Thoener – engineer on "Pink Houses"
- Sarah Flint – background vocals on "R.O.C.K. in the U.S.A."
- John Cascella – keyboards, accordion
- Lisa Germano – violin
- Pat Peterson – background vocals
- Crystal Taliefero – background vocals
- Dane Clark – drums on "Without Expression"
- Miriam Sturm – violin on "Without Expression"
- Andy York – guitars, background vocals on "Without Expression"
- Moe Z – keyboards, background vocals on "Without Expression"
- Corsillo/Manzobe-Design Monsters – art direction
- Paul Jasmin – photography

== Charts ==
=== Weekly charts ===
Chart (1997–1998)	Peak position
Australian Albums (ARIA)	5
Canada Albums (RPM)	9
New Zealand Albums (RMNZ)	19
Scottish Albums (Official Charts)	33
UK Albums (Official Charts)	25
US Billboard 200	33

=== Year-end charts ===
Chart (1997)	Position
Australian Albums (ARIA)	52
Chart (1998)	Position
Australian Albums (ARIA)	58

== Certifications ==
Certifications for The Best That I Could Do 1978–1988
Region	Certification	Certified units/sales
Australia (ARIA)	2× Platinum	140,000^{^}
Canada (Music Canada)	Platinum	100,000^{^}
United Kingdom (BPI)	Silver	60,000^{‡}
United States (RIAA)	3× Platinum	3,000,000^{^}
^{^} Shipments figures based on certification alone.^{‡} Sales+streaming figures based on certification alone.
