= Lonely Ol' Night =

Single by John Cougar Mellencamp

from the album Scarecrow
- B-side: "The Kind of Fella I Am"
- Released: August, 1985
- Recorded: April 9, 1985 at Belmont Mall, Belmont, Indiana
- Genre: Heartland rock
- Length: 3:45
- Label: Riva
- Songwriter: John Mellencamp
- Producers: Little Bastard, Don Gehman

John Cougar Mellencamp singles chronology
"Authority Song" (1984)	"Lonely Ol' Night" (1985)	"Small Town" (1985)

Music video
- "Lonely Ol' Night" on YouTube

"Lonely Ol' Night" is a rock song written and performed by singer-songwriter John Mellencamp. It appeared on his 1985 album Scarecrow and was released as the album's lead single, peaking at number 6 on the Billboard Hot 100. It also reached number 1 on the Top Rock Tracks chart, staying at the top spot for five weeks.

== Background and recording ==
The title of "Lonely Ol' Night" was inspired by a scene in the 1963 film Hud starring Paul Newman, based on the 1961 novel Horseman, Pass By by Larry McMurtry. John Cougar Mellencamp had seen the film many times as a young man, and its portrayal of Newman's character Hud Bannon's strained relationship with his father Homer Bannon (Melvyn Douglas) affected Mellencamp deeply, inspiring many of his song ideas.

The recording of "Lonely Ol' Night" occurred on April 9, 1985, according to the Scarecrow liner notes. The song was recorded at Belmont Mall in Belmont, Indiana, was produced by Mellencamp (under the alias "Little Bastard") and Don Gehman, engineered by Gehman and Greg Edward. Backing Mellencamp were Kenny Aronoff (drums), Toby Myers (bass), Larry Crane (guitar), and Mike Wanchic (guitar, background vocals).

== Release and charts ==
"Lonely Ol' Night" was the lead single from Scarecrow, following his previous hit single "Authority Song" (from 1983's Uh-Huh) to the Billboard Hot 100, where it debuted August 24, 1985. It peaked at number 6 on that chart and reached number 1 on the Top Rock Tracks chart, staying at the top spot for five weeks. It was Mellencamp's second chart-topper on the Top Rock Tracks chart, following 1982's "Hurts So Good".

Cash Box called it "a chugging track which portrays love as the all important link of life."

=== Chart performance ===
Chart (1985–1986)	Peak position
Australia (Kent Music Report)	32
Canada (RPM100 Singles)	7
New Zealand (Recorded Music NZ)	50
US Billboard Hot 100	6
US Billboard Top Rock Tracks	1
US Billboard Adult Contemporary	37

Year-end chart (1985)	Rank
US Top Pop Singles (Billboard)	86

== Music video ==
The video for "Lonely Ol' Night" was shot in and around Bloomington, Indiana. Kathryn Green, the wife of lyricist George Green, friend of Mellencamp's and co-writer of "Hurts So Good," "Crumblin' Down," and "Rain on the Scarecrow", appeared as Mellencamp's girlfriend in the video. According to the Mellencamp biography Born in a Small Town, Green's wife had told Mellencamp not to put "pretty girls" in the video, as it would be unrealistic to suggest their nights would be lonely; Mellencamp replied by offering her a role in the video.

In 1985, Mellencamp performed "Lonely Ol' Night" at the 1985 MTV Video Music Awards. The song has since become a concert highlight of Mellencamp's. It has also appeared on Mellencamp's greatest hits compilations The Best That I Could Do 1978–1988 and Words & Music: John Mellencamp's Greatest Hits.
