= Other People's Stuff =

2018 compilation album by John Mellencamp

Compilation album by John Mellencamp
- Released: December 7, 2018
- Studios: Belmont Mall Studios, Belmont, Indiana
- Genre: Roots rock
- Length: 34:18
- Language: English
- Label: Republic
- Producer: John Mellencamp

John Mellencamp chronology
Plain Spoken: From the Chicago Theatre (2018)	Other People's Stuff (2018)	Strictly a One-Eyed Jack (2022)

Other People's Stuff is a compilation album of cover songs by American roots rock musician John Mellencamp. The collection was released by Republic Records on December 7, 2018. The album collects cover songs that Mellencamp previously recorded for various tribute albums, a documentary soundtrack and four of his own studio albums over the past 25 years. The album contains only one song not previously available—a 2012 studio recording of “Eyes on the Prize”, which was the album's only single.

Several of the songs have been at least slightly remixed from their initial release. The CD version of “Teardrops Will Fall,” originally released on Mellencamp's 2003 covers album Trouble No More, is recast as a duet with Karen Fairchild from Little Big Town, with her newly recorded vocal remixed in with Mellencamp's original 2003 vocal. The vinyl and digital versions of the album do not include Fairchild's contribution.

While "I Don't Know Why I Love You" was originally released in 2003, Mellencamp recorded it in 1987 during the sessions for his The Lonesome Jubilee album.

== Reception ==
Stephen Thomas Erlewine of AllMusic gave the album three out of five stars, calling it a "summation of what Mellencamp loves about America." In Paste, Lee Zimmerman gave the recording a 7.2 out of 10, writing that several songs "maintain that sense of resolve, yet still offer due reverence to the originals."

The album debuted at the top of the Top Rock Albums chart.

== Track listing ==
1. "To the River" – 3:32 (originally from 1993's Human Wheels)
2. "Gambling Bar Room Blues" – 3:14 (originally from 1997's The Songs of Jimmie Rodgers – A Tribute)
3. "Teardrops Will Fall" – 4:16 (originally from 2003's Trouble No More)
4. "In My Time of Dying" – 3:01 (originally from 1999's Rough Harvest)
5. "Mobile Blue" – 3:01 (originally from 2017's Sad Clowns & Hillbillies)
6. "Eyes on the Prize" – 2:45 (new recording, song previously performed at The White House in 2010)
7. "Dark as a Dungeon" – 4:10 (originally from the 2017 National Geographic Channel documentary From the Ashes)
8. "Stones in My Passway" – 3:13 (originally from 2003's Trouble No More)
9. "Wreck of the Old 97" – 3:58 (originally from 2004's The Rose and The Briar)
10. "I Don't Know Why I Love You" – 3:08 (originally from 2003's An Interpretation of Stevie Wonder's Songs)

== Personnel ==
- John Mellencamp – vocals, guitar, paintings, art direction, production

=== Additional musicians ===
- Kenny Aronoff
- Carlene Carter
- John Cascella
- Dane Clark
- Michael Clark
- Larry Crane
- Lisa Germano
- David Grissom
- John Gunnell
- Heather Headley
- Janas Hoyt
- Courtney Kaiser
- Troye Kinnett
- Paul Mahern (also engineering)
- Toby Myers
- Pat Peterson
- Michael Ramos
- The Reverend Peyton's Big Damn Band
- Miriam Sturm
- Mike Wanchic
- Andy York

=== Technical personnel ===
- Scott Davis – assistant engineering
- Rick Fettig – assistant engineering
- Ray Kennedy – engineering
- David Leonard – engineering
- Joe Spix – art direction and design
- Myrna Suarez – photography

== Charts ==
=== Weekly charts ===
Chart (2018)	Peak position
Swiss Albums (Schweizer Hitparade)	70
US Billboard 200	7
US Top Rock Albums (Billboard)	1

=== Year-end charts ===
Chart (2019)	Position
US Top Rock Albums (Billboard)	90
