= Performs Trouble No More Live at Town Hall =

Live album by John Mellencamp
- Released: July 8, 2014
- Recorded: July 31, 2003
- Venue: Town Hall in New York City
- Genre: Blues; folk
- Label: Mercury

John Mellencamp chronology
No Better Than This (2010)	Performs Trouble No More Live at Town Hall (2014)	Plain Spoken (2014)

Performs Trouble No More Live at Town Hall is a live album by singer-songwriter John Mellencamp released on July 8, 2014 on Mercury Records. The album captures Mellencamp's live performance at Town Hall in New York City on July 31, 2003, in which he performed every track from his 2003 Trouble No More covers album as well as several other songs, including his own "Small Town", "Paper in Fire", and "Pink Houses".

The album omits two songs he performed on the night—renditions of "House of the Rising Sun", a traditional folk song made popular by The Animals, and "The End of the World", a 1962 Skeeter Davis hit that was on the original Trouble No More album.

In his original review of this performance in The New York Times, Jon Pareles wrote that Mellencamp's "scruffy baritone and its deep-seated rasp are rooted in 1960s soul, and he treated the old songs the way he would treat his own: adding instrumental hooks and often using a broad-shouldered beat direct from the Rolling Stones. He was seeking the spirit of the music, not its original performance style."

== Track listing ==
=== CD and digital version ===
1. "Stones in My Passway" (Robert Johnson)
2. "Death Letter" (Son House)
3. "To Washington" (Traditional; new lyrics by Mellencamp)
4. "Highway 61 Revisited" (Bob Dylan)
5. "Baltimore Oriole" (Hoagy Carmichael/Paul Francis Webster)
6. "Joliet Bound" (Kansas Joe McCoy/Memphis Minnie)
7. "Down in the Bottom" (Willie Dixon)
8. "Johnny Hart" (Woody Guthrie)
9. "Diamond Joe" (Traditional; new lyrics by Mellencamp)
10. "John the Revelator" (Traditional)
11. "Small Town" (Mellencamp)
12. "Lafayette" (Lucinda Williams)
13. "Teardrops Will Fall" (Gerry Granahan/Marion Smith)
14. "Paper in Fire" (Mellencamp)
15. "Pink Houses" (Mellencamp)

=== Vinyl version ===
Side one

1. "Stones in My Passway" (Robert Johnson)
2. "Death Letter" (Son House)
3. "Joliet Bound" (Kansas Joe McCoy/Memphis Minnie)
4. "Highway 61 Revisited" (Bob Dylan)
5. "Baltimore Oriole" (Hoagy Carmichael/Paul Francis Webster)

Side two

1. "Diamond Joe" (Traditional; new lyrics by Mellencamp)
2. "Down in the Bottom" (Willie Dixon)
3. "Small Town" (Mellencamp)
4. "Paper in Fire" (Mellencamp)
5. "Pink Houses" (Mellencamp)
