= Mr. Happy Go Lucky =

Studio album by John Mellencamp
- Released: September 10, 1996
- Recorded: January 1995 – June 1996
- Studio: Belmont Mall (Belmont, Indiana)
- Genre: Rock
- Length: 47:34
- Label: Mercury
- Producers: John Mellencamp; Mike Wanchic; Junior Vasquez

John Mellencamp chronology
Dance Naked (1994)	Mr. Happy Go Lucky (1996)	The Best That I Could Do 1978–1988 (1997)

Professional ratings
Review scores
Source	Rating
AllMusic	2.5/5 stars
Entertainment Weekly	B−
Q	3/5 stars
Rolling Stone	4/5 stars

Mr. Happy Go Lucky is the fourteenth studio album by American singer-songwriter and musician John Mellencamp. It was released on September 10, 1996. It was his first album released after his heart attack in 1994. Mellencamp's music on the album is said to reflect his brush with death. The album was recorded in Belmont, Indiana, in Mellencamp's Belmont Mall recording studio. The first single from the album, "Key West Intermezzo (I Saw You First)," peaked at No. 14 on the Billboard Hot 100 and is his last Top 40 single in the United States to date. "Just Another Day" was the album's second single and stalled at No. 46 on the Billboard Hot 100.

Mellencamp told the Associated Press of his concept for Mr. Happy Go Lucky: "When we started making this record, I thought I'd marry the rhythm of black music of the '90s, which is rap, and the sounds of black blues music of the '30s and '40s. We'd have Robert Johnson-type guitar licks playing with this rap rhythm underneath it. It didn't always work out that way, but that's the place we started from."

An outtake from Mr. Happy Go Lucky, "All Night Talk Radio," was included on Mellencamp's 2017 album Sad Clowns & Hillbillies.

== Artwork controversy ==
After being released into stores nationwide, Wal-Mart found the depiction of the Devil and Jesus on the cover to be offensive, additionally stating that it looked as if the baby in the photo was dead. Mellencamp responded the baby was his son, Hud, who was only sleeping; however, he was not upset at the cover being changed since he did not design or decide on it, and since the music was not required to be changed. In newer versions of the cover art the Devil and Jesus have been removed.

== Songs ==
Mellencamp commented on all the songs on Mr. Happy Go Lucky for a September 1996 feature in the Indianapolis Star. Below are the highlights from the insights Mellencamp shared with writer Marc D. Allan:

Overture: "I noticed when we were making this record ... that these melodies were real easy to recall. When we were looking at a way to start the record, I called up Miriam (Sturm, his then-new violinist) and said, 'I'm going to send you the entire album. See if you can't take the main melody of each song and put it together for us.' And that's what she did."

Jerry: "Songwriting, to me, has turned out to be an assortment of noodlings. When you write a good song – and I've written a lot of bad ones, so I know the difference – you kind of become elevated for a moment. I don't mean that in any grandiose way. But it's like, 'I'd better get this down now.' When that starts happening, like it did with 'Jerry' and a lot of the songs on this record, I have to say that I really had no intention of writing anything in particular. I didn't go in and think, 'Today I'll write a song about a guy who won't grow up.' I just picked up a guitar, started playing some chords (and sang) 'Jerry's yelling at the man in the moon.' It was just noodling. And I did it religiously on this record, until I was satisfied that I had written enough songs. I would get up every morning and instead of going into the art studio and painting, I went out and wrote songs. Then I'd work until I had something or until I was convinced that I wasn't going to get anything. Then I'd come back in, eat lunch, go back out and start the process again. Sometimes there'd be days – three, four, five days – where I had nothing. I'd tell (his wife) Elaine, 'Everything I write is terrible.' But then there were days – I think I wrote 'The Full Catastrophe' and 'Jerry' in the same day. It was a good day. I remember telling Elaine, 'These songs can't be any good. I've never been able to write two or three good songs in a day.'"

Key West Intermezzo (I Saw You First): "It was written by George (Green) and I. Like all the songs that George and I have written that were any good, it basically was written out of table talk. When George and I wrote 'Rain on the Scarecrow,' it was out of a big, long conversation about the plight of the farmers. (For Key West) George called me the next morning and said, 'I've got about half a set of lyrics written. I think it's really great.' When I come to play these songs for the guys in the band, it's like bringing a little baby in. I was singing, 'I saw you first,' and barely even strumming. All it takes for a song to die is somebody to go, 'I don't know.' If you've got to talk yourself into it, then let's go to the next song. I'll have lots of songs, and I don't want to waste time. Everybody sits here, reads the lyrics as I sing. I'll play it two times, nobody says a word. Then all of a sudden people start beating on their legs, or they'll get a guitar and start playing along. It just grows."

Just Another Day: "That was what the record company wanted to put out as the first single. (They said,) 'It sounds familiar.'"

This May Not Be the End of the World: "My favorite song on the record. That was the last song we recorded. We were using a kid, Moe Z. M.D., to come in and do the programming and help with the (drum) loops. He's in the band now, he liked it so much. ... I'm playing the song on acoustic guitar: 'This may not be the end of the world/but you can see it from here.' It was like a folk song. He must have been like, 'What is going on?' Don't forget: All these young kids start their songs with a loop. Everything starts with the rhythm. That's just about the last thing we always put on. He hears the song, goes back there (in the studio) and starts programming. Within an hour, he had what I think is the coolest groove on the record. I knew we needed an organ part – all these grooves are programmed on keyboards. So I said, 'Moe, can you play the organ?' ... The guy goes out there and it was like Billy Preston with the Beatles, a big, religious, gospel sound. He played it through one time, and it was like magic."

Emotional Love (written by Mellecamp's bassist Toby Myers, marking the first time Mellencamp recorded one of his band member's songs): "I've always encouraged everyone in the band, for years, to go out and do their own thing. Toby's been with the band for a long time. Toby has written songs forever ... One day he asked me, 'Is it all right if I go out to Belmont and record?' I said yeah. I knew he was out here messing around, and one night I get a phone call. He says, 'Hey, come out here, I want you to listen to something I wrote.' My reaction was, 'I'm having dinner. I had planned to play with the boys.' He said, 'It would really mean a lot to me.' So I come out here. He's out here by himself and he's got all the machines going. I came out here and he said, 'Help me write this song.' So we wrote a song and it wasn't very good. I said, 'Is this all you've got done?' And he said, 'No, I've got something I want to play you.' He played me 'Emotional Love,' and I (couldn't believe it). . . . We took his track, took his voice off and put mine on, added some guitars and some background vocal parts. Then Junior (Vasquez, who co-produced the album) added a loop and some percussion. The song is so different for me. I would never write a song so non-linear as that."

Mr. Bellows: "I remember the day I wrote it, I said, 'Where is this song coming from?' I was noodling and all of a sudden it was, 'Her majesty the queen's a pretty nice babe/I'd like to take her down to St. Petersburg some day. 'It came in minutes. I played it for Elaine and I said, 'Can I write this? Do you think this is too weird?' I was sitting at a picnic table when I wrote it, maybe around this time last year. I have to give the nod to Sympathy for the Devil, because I came to the conclusion that probably Mr. Bellows was the devil.

(The song ends with elderly people talking about their lives when a bittersweet violin plays underneath.) I told Rick, a guy who works here, 'Take a tape recorder and go to some old-folks homes and ask these folks if they're happy. We'll see what they say.' I was curious to see what someone in their 80s, living in an old-folk's home, might think of life. Then Miriam wrote the violin part. She had never heard the people talking. I said, "Play me what old people talking would sound like.'"

The Full Catastrophe: "That's my second-favorite song on the record. For a while, after I had my heart attack, I was going to see a psychiatrist, (wondering) 'How am I going to deal with this?' That came out of a conversation I had with him. He was saying, 'You've got to be able to suffer through, and enjoy, the full catastrophe of life.' I thought, 'Yeah, he's right. You can try to make the bad stuff good, you can really live that, really say, 'This is (screwed) up, so what? I can make something good out of it.' Consequently, seeing this guy a couple, three-dozen times, was about the best thing I could have done. He helped me come to that realization. I finally asked him, 'Where'd you get that line?' He said it was in Zorba the Greek. So I watched 'Zorba the Greek' and there it is. He's asked, 'Are you married?' He says, 'Oh, yeah. Houses, kids, wives. The full catastrophe.' I thought, 'OK, yeah. I'll use that. Thanks.' When I first wrote it, it was much sadder than it is now. I put too much of myself into it. So I went back the next day, took myself out of it and rewrote it. It became a much better, broader song."

Large World Turning: "That's one of those songs that took three minutes to write. Now that I listen to it, it's probably not one of the best songs on the record. But it's funny – each song in sequence has a job to do. It does its job."

Jackamo Road: "That song had an entire arrangement with the band, but it just wasn't any good. The only time the song sounded remotely good at all was when I played it on acoustic guitar – the way it ended up on the record. We spent six days in here, 12–13 hours a day, sequencing this record. That was something I'd never done before. We'd always sequenced the other records in an afternoon – Scarecrow, The Lonesome Jubilee and all those other records. There was about that much thought that went into it. When we got to the end of the record, I thought, 'We need something to happen here that hasn't happened.' So I just ran out and recorded 'Jackamo Road' in two minutes. I tried to sing it as country as I could, just to make it the opposite of the song I knew was going to come after it, 'Life Is Hard,' which is as urban-sounding a song as we've got. I'm still agonizing over 'Jackamo Road' because I wish I'd said another word. I think it says, 'I'd like to buy you a cabin cruiser/we could sail around.' You don't sail a cabin cruiser. When I sang it, it never dawned on me. But when I got it home, I thought, I'm going to have to record it again. But then I thought, 'Nobody's going to know.'"

Life Is Hard: "'Life Is Hard' was referred to as the worst song on the record by everybody. That song could have been replaced by any of four songs. I was doing an interview with Musician magazine; the guy was in the studio with us. I was in New York, doing mixing. I said, "What do you think is the worst song on the record?" I've known this guy a long time. He wouldn't make a commitment. So I said, 'I think 'Life Is Hard' is the worst song, so let's work on that.' I have to tip my hat to Junior. Junior saved that song. In a matter of two hours, it went from not going to make the record to one of my favorite songs on the record. He put a couple of loops on there and then we all sat there – me and Mike and Junior and Andy – and started cutting up these weird holes in the song. It was all Junior's inspiration."

== Critical reception ==
AllMusic gave the album a mixed review, claiming: "John Mellencamp responded to his massive heart attack and close-call with death with 'Mr. Happy Go Lucky,' the most overtly ambitious album in his career." Entertainment Weekly also gave a mixed review, proclaiming: "Mr. Happy Go Lucky is, disappointingly, not the groundbreaker it promised to be."

However, the album also garnered numerous positive reviews, including a four-star review from Rolling Stone, which stated: "There's nothing here with the bull's-eye appeal of 1982's 'Hurts So Good,' no adolescent anthems like Mellencamp's No. 1 single 'Jack and Diane.' Now in his mid-40s, Mellencamp has turned his back on calculated Top 40 gestures in favor of mature theatrics and a thick sonic gumbo. A little uneven but unrepentant, Mr. Happy Go Lucky is a mixed bag in the best sense: rife with ghosts, a healthy fear and a cocky embrace of middle age."

== Track listing ==
All tracks are written by John Mellencamp, except where noted.

No.	Title	Writer(s)	Length
1.	"Overture"	Mellencamp; arranged by Miriam Sturm	1:56
2.	"Jerry"		4:24
3.	"Key West Intermezzo (I Saw You First)"	Mellencamp, George M. Green	4:54
4.	"Just Another Day"		3:28
5.	"This May Not Be The End of the World"	Mellencamp, Green	5:29
6.	"Emotional Love"	Toby Myers	3:20
7.	"Mr. Bellows"		4:26
8.	"The Full Catastrophe"		3:11
9.	"Circling Around the Moon"	Mellencamp, Green	5:48
10.	"Large World Turning"		3:55
11.	"Jackamo Road"		1:37
12.	"Life Is Hard"		3:15

2005 re-issue bonus track
No.	Title	Length
13.	"What If I Came Knocking?" (live)	5:26

== Personnel ==
- John Mellencamp – vocals, guitar
- Mike Wanchic – guitars, dobro, background vocals, mellotron, organ, mandolin
- Andy York – guitars, background vocals, chamberlain, organ, harmonica, mandolin, mellotron, percussion
- Toby Myers – bass, background vocals, keyboards, percussion
- Kenny Aronoff – drums, percussion, loops, vibes
- Moe Z M.D. – loops, organ, backing vocals
- Raphael Saadiq – bass, backing vocals
- Miriam Sturm – violin
- Milton Davis – bass
- Jimmy Ryser – violin, backing vocals
- Lonnie Pitchford – slide guitar
- Pat Peterson – backing vocals
- Jeff Pedersen – organ
- Harvey Phillips – tuba
- Tim Riggins – trombone
- Dennis Riggins – saxophone

== Charts ==
Chart performance for Mr. Happy Go Lucky
Chart (1996)	Peak position
Australian Albums (ARIA)	11
Canada Top Albums/CDs (RPM)	11
Finnish Albums (Suomen virallinen lista)	26
German Albums (Offizielle Top 100)	53
New Zealand Albums (RMNZ)	36
Swedish Albums (Sverigetopplistan)	26
Swiss Albums (Schweizer Hitparade)	37
UK Albums (Official Charts)	82
US Billboard 200	9

== Certifications ==
Sales certifications for Mr. Happy Go Lucky
Region	Certification	Certified units/sales
Australia (ARIA)	Gold	35,000^{^}
Canada (Music Canada)	Platinum	100,000^{^}
United States (RIAA)	Platinum	1,000,000^{^}
^{^} Shipments figures based on certification alone.
