= Roadmaster (band) =

American rock band

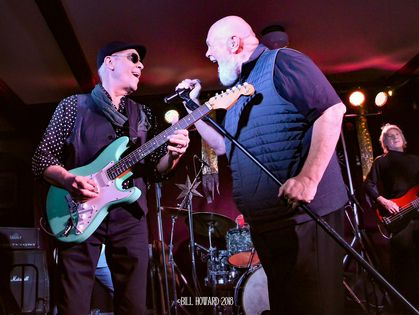
- Roadmaster, February 2018. Rick Benick (left) and Asher "Adam Smasher" Benrubi.

Background information
- Also known as: Pure Funk (until 1974)
- Origin: Indianapolis, Indiana, United States
- Genres: Pop rock, hard rock, arena rock, soft rock
- Years active: 1969–1983 (reunions: 1989, 1990, 1993, 1998, 2018)
- Labels: Village, Mercury, RDM, Retrospect, Utopia Naz Runt
- Past members: Rick Benick; Bobby Johns; Steve “Mac” McNally; Toby Myers; Michael Read; Asher “Adam Smasher” Benrubi; Steve Riley; Rob Swaynie; Tim Berry; Craig Watson; Frank Bradford; Peter Bailey; John Gennell; Tony Burton

Roadmaster was an American rock band from Indianapolis, Indiana, that was popular in the Midwest in the late 1970s and early 1980s. They recorded four albums for Village/Mercury Records. Members of the band played for several other successful rock acts with Midwestern roots from the ‘70s to the 1990s.

== History ==
Roadmaster started as Pure Funk, a popular Indiana college funk band, founded in 1969 by keyboard player Michael Read, vocalist Asher “Adam Smasher” Benrubi, and guitarist Rob Swaynie. Bassist Toby Myers joined the band in 1971. Guitarist Rick Benick met Read in the early 1970s when Benick moved to Indiana to join the Kokomo, Indiana rock band Nebula Spoon, but some time thereafter joined Pure Funk. Drummer Steve Riley rounded out their lineup. In 1974 the band changed its name to Roadmaster and its musical style began to evolve into a big guitar and keyboard-centered “arena” rock sound.

Roadmaster was discovered by Todd Rundgren, who invited the band to New York to record a demo, which led to a contract with Indianapolis record label Village Records. Rundgren produced three songs on their eponymous 1976 debut album. After that release, Smasher left the band, ultimately to pursue a career as a radio DJ, and former Nebula Spoon vocalist, Steve “Mac” McNally, replaced him. Riley also left, to be replaced by former Exile drummer Bobby Johns. With that lineup, Roadmaster recorded one more album for Village and two more for Mercury Records (which had acquired Village) from 1978 to 1980.

In the late ‘70s, Roadmaster toured with Pat Travers and Blue Öyster Cult and opened throughout the Midwest for mainstream rock acts such as The Cars, Cheap Trick, Peter Frampton, Eddie Money, Todd Rundgren, Rush, and ZZ Top. The band members wrote their own songs and their sound was similar to that of popular arena rock acts like Styx, Foreigner (their early material), Kansas (their hits), and REO Speedwagon. Their most popular songs included “Doesn’t Mean a Thing,” “Higher, Higher,” “Say You Wanna Be With Me,” “Hey World,” and their signature anthem, “Sweet Music.” Although they were very popular at home, Roadmaster was unable to break through nationally and their record deal with Mercury ended in 1980. Soon afterwards, McNally left the band. Craig Watson and Frank Bradford sang with the band after his departure. Tim Berry also replaced Johns as the band's drummer. In 1982, Toby Myers left to play for the next decade and a half with Seymour, Indiana native John Mellencamp. He was replaced by Peter Bailey and then by John Gennell. Roadmaster carried on for another year but broke up in 1983.

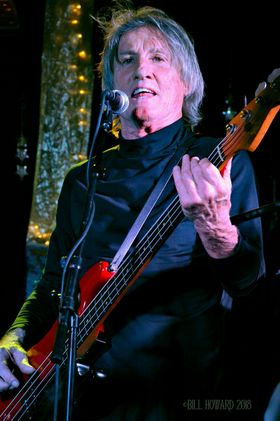
Toby Myers

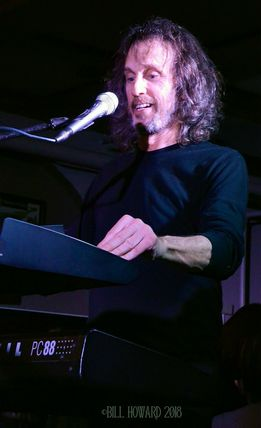
Michael Read

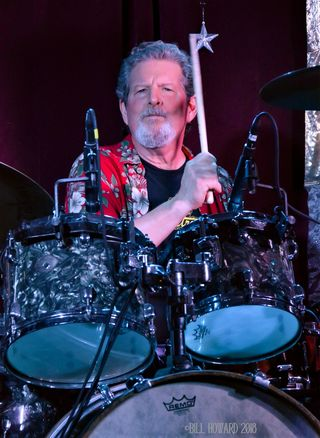
Bobby Johns

After the breakup, Benick, Read, and Berry played dates with Mitch Ryder. Mac McNally sang briefly in the early ‘80s with former members of The Knack in The Game. In the late ‘80s and early ‘90s, Myers, Benick, and Read played with Brazil, Indiana, rocker, Henry Lee Summer. Original drummer, Steve Riley, played with W.A.S.P. in the mid-‘80s; in the late ‘80s he joined L.A. Guns and remained with them until recently. Later in the ‘90s through the early 2000s, Summer, Benick and Read, along with former Faith Band vocalist, Carl Storie, played in the Indianapolis cover band, the Alligator Brothers.

Roadmaster reunited for several shows in 1988-90, 1993, 1998, and 2018. In 1989, with their ’78-’80 lineup, they recorded their last album, which included live performances of their most popular songs. In April 1990, they appeared at Farm Aid IV in Indianapolis. Videos of their 1993 performances were recorded and published by Retrospect Records. Mac McNally died of pancreatic cancer in 1998. Most recently, in February 2018, surviving members of the band reunited for a benefit concert for Rick Benick, who had been diagnosed with leukemia. Benick died in June 2018.

Steve Riley died in October 2023. Toby Myers died in January 2025.

== Band members ==
- Michael Read – keyboards, backing vocals (1969–1983, 1989, 1990, 1993, 1998, 2018)
- Steve Riley – drums (1969–1976; died 2023)
- Asher "Adam Smasher" Benrubi – vocals (1969–1976, 1998, 2018)
- Rob Swaynie – guitar (1969–1971)
- ??? – bass (1969–1971)
- Toby Myers – bass, backing vocals (1971–1982, 1989, 1990, 1993, 1998, 2018, died 2025)
- Rick Benick – guitar, backing vocals (1971–1983, 1988–1990, 1993, 1998, 2018, died 2018)
- Steven "Mac" McNally – vocals (1976–1980, 1989, 1990, 1993; died 1998)
- Bobby Johns – drums (1977–1980, 1989, 1990, 1993, 1998, 2018)
- Tim Berry – drums (1980–1983)
- Craig Watson – vocals (1980–1982)
- Frank Bradford – vocals (1982–1983)
- Peter Bailey – bass, backing vocals (1982)
- John Gennell – bass, backing vocals (1983)

== Discography ==
Albums

Year	Title	Label
1976	Roadmaster	Village
1978	Sweet Music	Village
1979	Hey World	Mercury
1980	Fortress	Mercury
1989	Live + 5	RDM
1994	Live! One for the Road	Retrospect
2010	ST + Sweet Talk	Utopia Naz Runt

Singles

Year	Title	Album
1976	"That Magic Feeling"	Roadmaster
1976	"Who Can Sing Like Fatboy Do"	Roadmaster
1978	"It Doesn't Mean A Thing"	Sweet Music
1978	"Circle Of Love"	Sweet Music
1979	"Hey World"	Hey World
1982	"Back In My Arms Again"	Single Only
