= R.O.C.K. in the U.S.A. =

"R.O.C.K. in the U.S.A. (A Salute to 60's Rock)"

Single by John Cougar Mellencamp

from the album Scarecrow
- B-side: "Under the Boardwalk"
- Released: January 1986
- Recorded: April 25, 1985
- Studio: Belmont Mall Studio (Belmont, Indiana)
- Genre: Heartland rock; rock and roll
- Length: 2:55 (album version); 2:48 (7" single)
- Label: Riva
- Songwriter: John Mellencamp
- Producers: John Mellencamp (a.k.a. "Little Bastard"); Don Gehman

John Cougar Mellencamp singles chronology
"Small Town" (1985)	"R.O.C.K. in the U.S.A. (A Salute to 60's Rock)" (1986)	"Rain on the Scarecrow" (1986)

Music video
- "R.O.C.K. in the U.S.A." on YouTube

"R.O.C.K. in the U.S.A.", subtitled "A Salute to 60's Rock", is a rock song written and performed by John Mellencamp. It was the third single from his 1985 album Scarecrow and a top-ten hit on both the Billboard Hot 100 and Top Rock Tracks charts, peaking at number 2 and number 6 respectively. In Australia, the single effectively became a double-A side when the B-side "Under the Boardwalk" received significant airplay and both tracks were listed together on the singles chart, reaching #18.

== Background and recording ==
According to the John Mellencamp biography Born in a Small Town, Mellencamp was initially reluctant to include "R.O.C.K. in the U.S.A." on Scarecrow, feeling the song was too light-hearted to include alongside the otherwise grim songs such as "Rain on the Scarecrow" and "Face of the Nation". Mellencamp told Timothy White in a 1986 article for the Illinois Entertainer of his decision to include "R.O.C.K. in the U.S.A." on Scarecrow: "It was one of those absolute last-split-second decisions. I was only including it on the cassette and CD copies of Scarecrow as a bonus party track, but my manager loved the energy of it and I thought, 'Yeah! What the hell!'"

Mellencamp required his band to learn how to play about 100 songs from the 1960s before recording Scarecrow, and the song includes several direct musical references to 1960s songs, including The Troggs' "Wild Thing".

The song was recorded at Belmont Mall in Belmont, Indiana. The recording was produced by Mellencamp (under the alias "Little Bastard") and Don Gehman, engineered by Gehman and Greg Edward; backing Mellencamp on the recording were Kenny Aronoff (drums), Toby Myers (bass), Mike Wanchic (guitars, background vocals), Larry Crane (guitars, flutophone), John Cascella (keyboards), and Sarah Flint (background vocals).

== Reception ==
Cash Box called it a "no-holds-barred rocker." Billboard said that it "evokes, without quite quoting, reference points from 'La Bamba' to '96 Tears.'"

== Chart performance ==
=== Weekly charts ===
Chart (1986)	Peak position
Australia (Australian Music Report)	18
Canada (RPM) Top Singles	7
United Kingdom (Top 100)	67
U.S. Billboard Hot 100	2
U.S. Billboard Adult Contemporary	36
New Zealand (Top 50)	17
Netherlands (Top 100)	42

=== Year-end charts ===
Charts (1986)	Rank
Australia (Kent Music Report)	50
US Top Pop Singles (Billboard)	66

== Music video ==
A music video for the single was released in 1986. The video was directed by Mellencamp and Faye Cummings, and it was filmed using a kinescope camera. It featured an African American-vocal group and a Caucasian-instrumental group with the two groups playing together at the end of the video.

== In popular culture ==
During George W. Bush's first presidential campaign, "R.O.C.K. in the U.S.A." was played at a campaign event. While Mellencamp had denied the request of President Ronald Reagan to use "Pink Houses" as a campaign song in 1984 during his presidential re-election campaign, he expressed reluctance to object to Bush's use of "R.O.C.K. in the U.S.A." at the event, telling Rolling Stone that despite his opposition to Bush's political positions, "I don't see any sense in being silly about it. It's entertainment. It's a song."
