= Human Wheels =

Studio album by John Mellencamp
- Released: September 7, 1993
- Recorded: 1992–1993
- Genre: Rock
- Length: 45:17
- Label: Mercury
- Producers: John Mellencamp; Malcolm Burn; David Leonard; Mike Wanchic

John Mellencamp chronology
Whenever We Wanted (1991)	Human Wheels (1993)	Dance Naked (1994)

Professional ratings
Review scores
Source	Rating
AllMusic	link
Entertainment Weekly	A
Q	4/5 stars
Robert Christgau	(dud)
Rolling Stone	4/5 stars

Human Wheels is the twelfth studio album by American singer-songwriter John Mellencamp. Released on Mercury Records on September 7, 1993, it peaked at No. 7 on the Billboard 200. The single "What If I Came Knocking" was Mellencamp's last No. 1 single on the Album Rock Tracks chart, staying atop for two weeks in the summer of 1993. The album has been certified Platinum by the RIAA for sales of 1,000,000 copies.

Entertainment Weekly gave the record an "A" rating, stating: "John Mellencamp's last album was more or less straight-ahead rock, but there's something dark and unshaven about his new one, 'Human Wheels.' Oddball instruments — pennywhistles, mandolins — pop up like disordered wraiths over gritty drum tracks that sound like they were recorded in a cluttered cellar. Mellencamp himself mutters and snarls in a voice of tangled complexity, worrying his way through songs about trouble."

Spin Magazine named Human Wheels the fifth best album of 1993.

== Background ==
The title track was borne out of a poem Mellencamp's friend George Green wrote as a eulogy he delivered at the grave site upon the death of his grandfather. "He had no intention of using it as a song," Mellencamp said in a 2008 interview with the Bloomington Herald Times. "He had me read it and I said, 'These are the best lyrics you ever wrote.' He said, 'They're not lyrics' and I said, 'I can make them lyrics.' I took it and kind of cut it up and wrote the chorus." Mellencamp gave additional insight into the writing process of "Human Wheels" in a 2004 American Songwriter interview, saying: "I wrote that song without a guitar or anything. I just sang that melody. I figured out the cadence in my head, and then I went to my guitar to figure out the chords."

"To me, this record is very urban," Mellencamp told Billboard Magazine's Craig Rosen in a July 3, 1993, story. "We had a lot of discussions about the rhythm and blues music of the day. We explored what a lot of these current bands are doing—these young black bands that are doing more than just sampling.

"The rhythms in songs like 'Birmingham' or 'French Shoes' or 'Junior' are R&B, but to me, R&B is the basic beat that propels the human body. Sly & the Family Stone also deserve a tip of the hat here, because as a kid when I heard Sly sing 'hot fun at the country fair,' I said, 'Man, that's for me!' Years later, I saw that there was a lot more subtlety and intensity to his music than I first realized. And whether you hear the influence in Tone Loc or Arrested Development, Sly remains an under-credited inspiration in '90s rock 'n roll. He made street music, and I wanted things like 'Birmingham' to have the rhythm of the streets."

Of the lead track, "When Jesus Left Birmingham", Mellencamp told Billboard: "I wrote 'When Jesus Left Birmingham' in Amsterdam in 1992 after driving back at 2 a.m. from a concert we'd done down in The Hague. When we got to the hotel, it looked like Sodom and Gomorrah, with dozens of well-dressed businessmen all around the area picking up prostitutes and going wild. I thought, 'There's something wrong here: It's a Wednesday night, at an hour when anybody sane is asleep, and these people are just getting started!' It gave you the sense that there's no bottom line anymore in anyone's behavior."

On the reflective "Sweet Evening Breeze," Mellencamp said in the liner notes to his 2010 box set On the Rural Route 7609: "Can you name another song that sounds like that? I think that song is beautifully produced and arranged."

The album is dedicated to band member John Cascella, who died unexpectedly about halfway through the production of the album.

== Promotion ==
Mercury Records utilized a unique (for the time period) two-tiered singles campaign to promote the album. They released "What if I Came Knocking" to radio in July 1993, and followed it up a month later with a second single, "Human Wheels", which charted at No. 48 on the Billboard Hot 100. "The whole idea came from Jimi Hendrix," Mellencamp told Billboard. "He put out a single, and said, 'I did pretty good with that one, let's make another one.' Then they made an album."

== Track listing ==
All tracks are written by John Mellencamp, except where noted.

No.	Title	Writer(s)	Length
1.	"When Jesus Left Birmingham"		5:16
2.	"Junior"		4:08
3.	"Human Wheels"	Mellencamp; George Green	5:33
4.	"Beige to Beige"		3:52
5.	"Case 795 (The Family)"		5:15
6.	"Suzanne and the Jewels"		3:55
7.	"Sweet Evening Breeze"		4:51
8.	"What If I Came Knocking"		5:05
9.	"French Shoes"		3:41
10.	"To the River"	Janis Ian; John Vezner; Mellencamp	3:33

2005 re-issue bonus track
No.	Title	Length
11.	"When Jesus Left Birmingham" (featuring Sounds of Blackness)	3:58

== Personnel ==
- John Mellencamp – vocals, guitar
- Kenny Aronoff – drums, percussion
- David Grissom – guitars, mandolin, bass
- Lisa Germano – violin, mandolin, penny whistle, zither, background vocals
- Toby Myers – bass, background vocals
- Pat Peterson – background vocals, accordion, maracas, co-lead vocals on "Case 795 (The Family)", "French Shoes"
- Mike Wanchic – guitars, dobro, dulcimer, background vocals
- Malcolm Burn – organ, guitar, harmonica, synthesizer
- John Cascella – accordion, organ, background vocals, penny whistle, melodica
- Janas Hoyt – harmony vocals

== Charts ==
=== Weekly charts ===
Weekly chart performance for Human Wheels
Chart (1993)	Peak position
Australian Albums (ARIA)	7
Canada Top Albums/CDs (RPM)	6
German Albums (Offizielle Top 100)	48
Dutch Albums (Album Top 100)	87
Swedish Albums (Sverigetopplistan)	8
Swiss Albums (Schweizer Hitparade)	18
UK Albums (Official Charts)	37
US Billboard 200	7

=== Year-end charts ===
Year-end chart performance for Human Wheels
Chart (1993)	Position
Canada Top Albums/CDs (RPM)	33
