= Key West Intermezzo (I Saw You First) =

1996 single by John Mellencamp

Single by John Mellencamp

from the album Mr. Happy Go Lucky
- B-side: "Like a Rolling Stone"
- Released: August 13, 1996
- Length: 4:54
- Label: Mercury
- Songwriters: John Mellencamp; George Green
- Producer: Little Bastard

John Mellencamp singles chronology
"Dance Naked" (1994)	"Key West Intermezzo (I Saw You First)" (1996)	"Just Another Day" (1997)

Music video
- "Key West Intermezzo (I Saw You First)" on YouTube

"Key West Intermezzo (I Saw You First)" is a song by American rock musician John Mellencamp. It was released in August 1996 by Mercury Records, as the first single from his 14th studio album, Mr. Happy Go Lucky (1996), and peaked at numbers 13 and 14 on the US Cash Box Top 100 and Billboard Hot 100 charts, making it his final top-40 hit in the US. In Canada, it gave Mellencamp his fourth number-one single on the RPM 100 Hit Tracks chart, staying at number one for five weeks. It additionally reached the top 40 in Australia and New Zealand. The song's music video features American actor Matthew McConaughey.

== Track listings ==
- US CD and cassette single; Australasian CD single
1. "Key West Intermezzo (I Saw You First)" (edit) – 4:14
2. "Like a Rolling Stone" – 6:28
- US maxi-CD single; UK CD1; and Japanese CD single
1. "Key West Intermezzo (I Saw You First)" (edit)
2. "Wild Night" (live)
3. "What If I Came Knocking" (live)
4. "Small Town" (acoustic)
- US 7-inch single

A. "Key West Intermezzo (I Saw You First)" (edit) – 4:14
B. "Just Another Day" – 3:28

- UK CD2
1. "Key West Intermezzo (I Saw You First)" (edit) – 4:15
2. "Cold Sweat" (live) – 3:23
3. "Check It Out" (live) – 6:14
4. "Like a Rolling Stone" (live) – 6:27

== Charts ==
=== Weekly charts ===
Chart (1996)	Peak position
Australia (ARIA)	21
Canada Top Singles (RPM)	1
Canada Adult Contemporary (RPM)	3
Iceland (Íslenski Listinn Topp 40)	24
New Zealand (Recorded Music NZ)	35
UK Singles (Official Charts)	83
US Billboard Hot 100	14
US Adult Alternative Airplay (Billboard)	1
US Adult Contemporary (Billboard)	15
US Adult Pop Airplay (Billboard)	4
US Mainstream Rock Airplay (Billboard)	10
US Pop Airplay (Billboard)	12
US Cash Box Top 100	13
US CHR/Pop Top 50 (Radio and Records)	9

=== Year-end charts ===
Chart (1996)	Position
Canada Top Singles (RPM)	8
Canada Adult Contemporary (RPM)	26
US Billboard Hot 100	71
US Adult Top 40 (Billboard)	30
US Mainstream Rock Tracks (Billboard)	58
US Top 40/Mainstream (Billboard)	56
US Triple-A (Billboard)	3

=== Decade-end charts ===
Chart (1990–1999)	Position
Canada (Nielsen SoundScan)	19

== Release history ==
Region	Date	Format(s)	Label(s)	Ref(s).
United States	July 30, 1996	Top 40; triple A; AC; hot AC; rock; active rock radio	Mercury	
United States	August 13, 1996	CD	Mercury	
Japan	November 25, 1996	CD	Mercury	
