= On the Rural Route 7609 =

2010 compilation album by John Mellencamp

Box set by John Mellencamp
- Released: June 15, 2010
- Recorded: 1976–2009
- Genre: Rock, heartland rock, folk
- Label: Island Def Jam
- Producer: John Mellencamp

John Mellencamp chronology
Life, Death, Live and Freedom (2009)	On the Rural Route 7609 (2010)	No Better Than This (2010)

On the Rural Route 7609 is a box set by rock singer/songwriter John Mellencamp that was released on June 15, 2010. The first part of the title refers to the song "Rural Route" (which is included in two versions) from his 2007 album Freedom's Road and the fact that Mellencamp's music and lifestyle have always been very rural in nature, and 7609 references that the set spans Mellencamp's entire recording career from 1976 to 2009. Said Mellencamp in the set's liner notes: "I started making records in '76, and the most recent track on the collection was done in '09. So Rural Route 7609; it's like an address. I thought it sounded cool."

The liner notes for On the Rural Route 7609 were penned by veteran rock journalist Anthony DeCurtis, who also wrote the liner notes for Eric Clapton's Crossroads and Billy Joel's My Lives. DeCurtis wrote a 4,500-word essay on Mellencamp, and Mellencamp provides track-by-track commentary.

== Summary ==
This box set contains four discs and 54 tracks and each disc is set up as an individual album with common themes rather than being presented in chronological order. The purpose behind this set is to highlight Mellencamp's songwriting.

While there are many standard album tracks included on the set, there is also quite a bit of previously unreleased material, although no new unreleased songs. Highlights include Mellencamp's newly recorded version of "Colored Lights" (a song he wrote for The Blasters in 1985), "Jenny at 16" (a demo which ultimately became "Jack and Diane"), and recently recorded solo acoustic versions of "Sugar Marie" and "To M.G. (Wherever She May Be)".

== Reception ==
Professional ratings
Review scores
Source	Rating
AllMusic	4.0/5 stars
Rolling Stone	4.0/5 stars
Goldmine Magazine	4.0/5 stars
Blurt Magazine	9.0/10 stars

Rolling Stone magazine senior editor David Fricke gave On the Rural Route 7609 four stars in the July 8, 2010 issue. Fricke wrote:

"These four CDs come in a hardcover book with the heft and texture of a Dust Bowl-family photo album. The setting suits the purpose. This is a study in storytelling – Mellencamp's drive to probe and capture, with folk grit and a great rock band, the gross injustices and precious victories of American life. The hits come with context: "Jack and Diane" appears with two formative demos. But there is more emphasis on honoring, in songs like "Rural Route" and "Ghost Towns Along the Highway", "the Woody Guthrie ideal": a melody and truth to move the world."

== Track listing ==
=== Disc one ===
1. Longest Days
2. Grandma's Theme – In the Baggage Coach Ahead (Alternate mix, without simulated record crackle)
3. Rural Route
4. Jackie Brown
5. Rain on the Scarecrow (Rough Harvest version)
6. Jim Crow - lyrics read by Cornel West **
7. Jim Crow
8. Big Daddy of Them All
9. Deep Blue Heart
10. Forgiveness
11. Don't Need This Body
12. Jenny at 16 (demo) *
13. Jack & Diane (writing demo)*
14. Jack & Diane

=== Disc two ===
1. The Real Life - lyrics read by Joanne Woodward **
2. Ghost Towns Along the Highway
3. The Full Catastrophe
4. Authority Song (writing demo)*
5. Troubled Land
6. To Washington
7. Our Country (alternative version)*
8. Country Gentlemen
9. Freedom's Road
10. Mr. Bellows (remixed version) *
11. Rodeo Clown
12. Love and Happiness (Rough Harvest version)
13. Pink Houses

=== Disc three ===
1. If I Die Sudden (live)
2. Someday
3. Between a Laugh and a Tear (Rough Harvest version)
4. Void in My Heart * (Recorded live at Chess Studios in May 1989)
5. Death Letter
6. Sugar Marie (2009 acoustic) *
7. Theo and Weird Henry
8. When Jesus Left Birmingham
9. L.U.V.
10. Thank You
11. Women Seem
12. The World Don't Bother Me None (from the 2004 film America's Heart and Soul)*
13. Cherry Bomb (writing demo)*
14. Someday the Rains Will Fall (recorded in 2009 in room 636 Gunter Hotel, San Antonio, Texas) on NCIS: The Official TV Soundtrack – Vol. 2 (2009)
15. A Ride Back Home

=== Disc four ===
1. My Aeroplane
2. Colored Lights (2009 recording. Written in 1985 for The Blasters) *
3. Just Like You
4. Young Without Lovers
5. To M.G. (Wherever She May Be) (2009 acoustic) *
6. Sweet Evening Breeze
7. What If I Came Knocking
8. County Fair
9. Peaceful World (acoustic) *
10. Your Life Is Now
11. For the Children
12. Rural Route (alternative version) *

* = Previously unreleased
** = Reading of lyrics
