= Rough Harvest =

Studio album by John Mellencamp
- Released: August 17, 1999
- Recorded: 1986, 1994, 1997
- Genre: Americana
- Length: 50:01
- Label: Mercury
- Producer: John Mellencamp, Mike Wanchic, Don Gehman (Track 12)

John Mellencamp chronology
John Mellencamp (1998)	Rough Harvest (1999)	Cuttin' Heads (2001)

Rough Harvest is the 16th album by American singer John Mellencamp, a collection of alternate, acoustic arrangements of his favorite tracks, as well as several covers, released on August 17, 1999. Recorded mostly in 1997 (with the exception of "Under the Boardwalk", which was recorded in 1986, and "Wild Night" in 1994), the album fulfilled Mellencamp's contractual obligation with Mercury Records.

"It was very easy for me," Mellencamp told the St. Louis Post-Dispatch's Kevin C. Johnson of the acoustic arrangements on Rough Harvest in a September 30, 1999, article. "Actually, every song I ever wrote I wrote on acoustic guitar first. That's pretty much how the songs sound before I put electricity to them. When I start arranging, it's a big step when you have to add a band to the song."

On his cover of "Under the Boardwalk," which was originally the B-side of his 1986 hit "R.O.C.K. in the U.S.A." and was performed live on the Scarecrow Tour and The Lonesome Jubilee Tour, Mellencamp told the Post-Dispatch: "God bless the Drifters, but I thought the song was a little slow. I think that suited the times very well. I was a kid at the time, and that groove was a very urban groove, a very black groove, and what I did was take that groove and record it with a rock groove."

Professional ratings
Review scores
Source	Rating
AllMusic	3/5 stars
Entertainment Weekly	B−
The Rolling Stone Album Guide	3/5 stars

== Track listing ==
1. "Love and Happiness" (John Mellencamp) – 3:37
2. "In My Time of Dying" (Traditional) – 3:03
3. "Between a Laugh and a Tear" (Mellencamp) – 2:53
4. "Human Wheels" (Mellencamp, Green) – 5:15
5. "Rain on the Scarecrow" (Mellencamp, Green) – 3:18
6. "Farewell Angelina" (Bob Dylan) – 4:36
7. "Key West Intermezzo (I Saw You First)" (Mellencamp, Green) – 4:34
8. "Jackie Brown" (Mellencamp) – 3:50
9. "When Jesus Left Birmingham" (Mellencamp) – 3:35
10. "The Full Catastrophe" (Mellencamp) – 3:17
11. "Minutes to Memories" (Mellencamp, Green) – 4:29
12. "Under the Boardwalk" (Resnick, Kenny Young) – 3:57
13. "Wild Night" (Live) (Van Morrison) – 3:37
14. "Seventh Son" (2005 reissue bonus track) – 2:43

== Personnel ==
- John Mellencamp – vocals, guitar
- Mike Wanchic – guitar, vocals
- Andy York – guitar
- Dane Clark – drums
- Toby Myers – bass guitar
- Miriam Sturm – violin
- Moe Z M.D. – keyboards
- Janas Hoyt – backing vocals
- Me'shell Ndegeocello – bass guitar and vocals on "Wild Night"
