= John Mellencamp (album) =

Studio album by John Mellencamp
- Released: October 6, 1998
- Recorded: 1998
- Genre: Rock
- Length: 45:56
- Label: Columbia
- Producer: John Mellencamp

John Mellencamp chronology
| The Best That I Could Do 1978–1988 (1997) | John Mellencamp (1998) | Rough Harvest (1999) |

Professional ratings
Review scores
| Source | Rating |
|---|---|
| AllMusic | 3/5 stars |
| Entertainment Weekly | B |
| Rolling Stone | 4/5 stars |

John Mellencamp is the 15th album by American singer-songwriter and musician John Mellencamp, released on October 6, 1998. It was the first of three albums Mellencamp would record for Columbia Records. "On this record, we ended up quite a bit away from where we started," Mellencamp told Guitar World Acoustic in 1998. "Initially, I wanted to make a record that barely had drums on it. Donovan made a record (in 1966), Sunshine Superman, and I wanted to start with that same kind of vibe—Eastern, very grand stories, fairy tales. We ended up with a few Eastern instruments. But everybody prepared to make that record. After the last tour, I gave everybody Sunshine Superman, and I said: 'Listen to this record, because you're going to need to know it.'"

While it is unusual for an artist to release a self-titled album this late in their career, Mellencamp was asked by Columbia Records to self-title his debut album for them to mark a fresh start and a creative rebirth.

== Track listing ==
CD
| No. | Title | Writer(s) | Length |
|---|---|---|---|
| 1. | "Fruit Trader" | John Mellencamp | 3:57 |
| 2. | "Your Life Is Now" | Mellencamp, George Green | 3:59 |
| 3. | "Positively Crazy" | Mellencamp, Green, Andrew York | 4:09 |
| 4. | "I'm Not Running Anymore" | Mellencamp | 3:26 |
| 5. | "It All Comes True" | Mellencamp, Green | 3:58 |
| 6. | "Eden Is Burning" | Mellencamp | 3:50 |
| 7. | "Where the World Began" | Mellencamp; Green | 3:29 |
| 8. | "Miss Missy" | Mellencamp | 3:40 |
| 9. | "Chance Meeting at the Tarantula" | Mellencamp | 4:05 |
| 10. | "Break Me Off Some" | Mellencamp; Moe Z M.D.; Green | 4:10 |
| 11. | "Summer of Love" | Mellencamp; York | 4:01 |
| 12. | "Days of Farewell" | Mellencamp; Toby Myers | 3:12 |
| Total length: | | | 45:56 |

== Personnel ==
- John Mellencamp – vocals, guitar

Band

- Dane Clark – drums, percussion
- Toby Myers – bass, vocals
- Miriam Sturm – violin, keys, vocals
- Mike Wanchic – guitars, vocals
- Andy York – guitars, Indian instruments, keys, vocals
- Moe Z M.D. – keys, loops, vocals

Guests

- Lisa Germano – violin, harmonica on "Miss Missy"
- Janas Hoyt – vocals
- Killa – vocals
- Stan Lynch – drums on "Miss Missy"
- Pat Peterson – vocals on "Miss Missy"
- Vess "Elvis" Ruhtenberg – bass on "It All Comes True"
- Jimmy Ryser – vocals
- Izzy Stradlin – guitar on "Miss Missy"

== Charts ==
Chart performance for John Mellencamp
| Chart (1998) | Peak position |
|---|---|
| Australian Albums (ARIA) | 41 |
| Canada Top Albums/CDs (RPM) | 37 |
| Swiss Albums (Schweizer Hitparade) | 48 |
| US Billboard 200 | 41 |
