= Walk Tall (John Mellencamp song) =

Single by John Mellencamp

from the album Words & Music: John Mellencamp's Greatest Hits
- Released: 2004
- Studio: Belmont Mall Studio, Bloomington, Indiana
- Genre: Folk rock
- Length: 3:45
- Label: Island
- Songwriter(s): John Mellencamp
- Producer(s): Babyface

John Mellencamp singles chronology
"Teardrops Will Fall" (2003)	"Walk Tall" (2004)	"What Say You" (2004)

"Walk Tall" is a song by American singer-songwriter John Mellencamp, from his 2004 compilation Words & Music: John Mellencamp's Greatest Hits. Mellencamp wrote the track as an inspirational, folk rock song, and recruited Babyface to give the song R&B-style production.

The single was favorably received by critics and became a top 40 hit on the Adult Contemporary, Adult Top 40, and Adult Alternative Airplay charts in the United States, peaking at number three on the latter. An accompanying music video starred Peter Dinklage as a milkman in a 1950s-style world where height is the basis of discrimination. It went into rotation on MTV, VH1, and CMT, and was nominated for an award at the 2005 CMT Music Awards.

== Writing and production ==
In a 2004 interview with CMT, Mellencamp said that in writing the song, he was inspired by Woody Guthrie. Mellencamp reflected that Guthrie had said that "it was important for him to write songs about people and try to make them feel good about themselves", which led him to write "Walk Tall" as an inspirational song. For production, Mellencamp worked with R&B producer Babyface, telling American Songwriter that he immediately knew that he "wanted to have an R&B feel for that song" and so played it for Babyface and asked him to "see what kind of R&B feel you can put to it". Mellencamp recalled that he played Babyface "one verse and one chorus and he had already come up with the feel. And that happened within, no exaggeration, thirty seconds of him hearing the song... he was already playing that rhythm against my folk rhythm. So I looked at him at that point and said, 'I’ll see you in Indiana in a few weeks.'"

Billboard critic Jim Bessman described the song as "politically charged" and "spiritually uplifting". In a review for PopMatters, Hank Kalet deemed the song a "political folk rocker".

== Reception ==
Critics reviewed the song favorably. In a four-star review of Words & Music, Rolling Stone critic David Wild called the song "encouragingly vital". Bessman, in a review for Billboard, pointed to the song as evidence that Mellencamp "has managed to remain current for a quarter-century". Commercially, "Walk Tall" reached number 25 on the Adult Contemporary chart, as well as number 26 on the Adult Top 40 and number 3 on the Adult Alternative Airplay chart. On the Adult Alternative Airplay chart, it became his sixth top five hit, as well as his first since 2001's "Peaceful World" with India Arie.

During a concert in July 2006, former vice president Dan Quayle walked out as Mellencamp performed the song after he introduced it as being for "those being ignored by the current administration." Subsequent comments by Quayle called Mellencamp's performance "not very good to begin with" and opined that Mellencamp's "comment put it over the top."

== Music video ==
A music video for the song, directed by Chris Milk and produced by Gina Leonard, was filmed in Hanford, California, in September 2004. The filming site was selected for its "small town feel". The video, shot mostly in black and white, has been described as a "period piece against prejudice", set in an alternative 1950s where discrimination takes place because of height, rather than race. It follows a milkman with dwarfism (played by Peter Dinklage) as he flees a lynch mob and reunites with his girlfriend, who uses a wheelchair. The video went into rotation on MTV, CMT, and VH1. For the week ending November 7, 2004, it was among the 30 most-played videos on both MTV and VH1. It continued to be among the most-played videos on VH1 and CMT the week ending February 13, 2005.

At the 2005 Music Video Production Association Awards, "Walk Tall" was nominated for Adult Contemporary Video of the Year, while Milk was nominated for Director of the Year for his work on the video among others. The video won Adult Contemporary Video of the Year. At the 2005 CMT Music Awards, Mellencamp was a first-round nominee for multiple awards, including "most inspiring video of the year" for "Walk Tall". Following fan voting, the video failed to qualify for the top-four second round. Although the video was not nominated for an award at the 2005 MTV Video Music Awards, an article by the Associated Press argued that it should win Best Male Video.

== Track listing ==
- UK Promotional CD single
1. Walk Tall (Radio Edit) — 3:43
- US Promotional CD single
1. Mellencamp Medley — 2:24
2. Walk Tall (Radio Edit) — 3:43

== Credits ==
Adapted from CD single liner notes.

- Kenneth "Babyface" Edmonds — guitars, background vocals
- Reggie Hamilton — bass
- Rick Lawson — drums
- John Mellencamp — vocals
- Michael Ramos — keyboards
- Miriam Sturm — violin
- Andy York — guitars

== Charts ==
Chart (2005)	Peak position
US Adult Alternative Airplay (Billboard)	3
US Adult Contemporary (Billboard)	25
US Adult Pop Airplay (Billboard)	26
