= Cherry Bomb (John Mellencamp song) =

1987 single by John Mellencamp

Single by John Cougar Mellencamp

from the album The Lonesome Jubilee
- B-side: "Shama Lama Ding Dong"
- Released: October 24, 1987
- Studio: Belmont Mall (Indiana, US)
- Genre: Rock; heartland rock
- Length: 4:47
- Label: Mercury
- Songwriter: John Mellencamp
- Producers: John Mellencamp, Don Gehman

John Cougar Mellencamp singles chronology
| "Paper in Fire" (1987) | "Cherry Bomb" (1987) | "Check It Out" (1988) |

Music video
- John Mellencamp - Cherry Bomb (Official Music Video) on YouTube

"Cherry Bomb" is a song by American rock singer John Mellencamp. It was released as the second single from Mellencamp's ninth studio album, The Lonesome Jubilee (1987). The single was released in the United States in October 1987, backed with the B-side "Shama Lama Ding Dong".

== Background ==
"Cherry Bomb" features a female voice (Mellencamp background singer Crystal Taliefero) and two other male voices (band members Toby Myers and Mike Wanchic) in addition to Mellencamp's on the second verse. Mellencamp told GQ magazine in 2022 what inspired him to have voices other than his own take turns singing lead: "Sly and the Family Stone. He had all those hit records when I was in junior high, and I love the fact that all of a sudden there's a female voice, then a male voice."

== Lyrics ==
"Cherry Bomb" is a nostalgic song that reflects on Mellencamp's teenage years hanging out at the Last Exit Teen Club. The opening line of the chorus, "That's when a sport was a sport" is often misinterpreted as "That's when a smoke was a smoke."

== Chart performance ==
Upon its release, "Cherry Bomb" reached number one on the Billboard Album Rock Tracks chart, number 12 on the Adult Contemporary chart, and number eight on the Hot 100. Internationally, "Cherry Bomb" peaked at number four in New Zealand and number five in Canada, earning a gold certification in the latter country.

== Music video ==
The music video for the song features an interracial couple dancing intimately with one another near a jukebox while Mellencamp dances by himself, switching to Mellencamp and his band playing the song on a beach, interspersed with vintage video clips. Mellencamp spent years in an interracial band and felt it was important to make a statement about music’s effect on people and the benefits of different kinds of music coming together.

== Charts ==
=== Weekly charts ===
| Chart (1987–1988) | Peak position |
|---|---|
| Australia (Australian Music Report) | 20 |
| Canada Top Singles (RPM) | 5 |
| Netherlands (Single Top 100) | 64 |
| New Zealand (Recorded Music NZ) | 4 |
| US Billboard Hot 100 | 8 |
| US Adult Contemporary (Billboard) | 12 |
| US Mainstream Rock (Billboard) | 1 |
| US Cash Box Top 100 | 18 |

=== Year-end charts ===
| Chart (1988) | Position |
|---|---|
| Canada Top Singles (RPM) | 66 |
| US Billboard Hot 100 | 92 |

== Certifications ==
| Region | Certification | Certified units/sales |
|---|---|---|
| Canada (Music Canada) | Gold | 50,000^{^} |
| New Zealand (RMNZ) | Platinum | 30,000^{‡} |
^{^} Shipments figures based on certification alone.^{‡} Sales+streaming figures based on certification alone.
