= Belmont Mall Studio =

Recording studio in Indiana

Coordinates: 39.14795°N 86.33776°W

- Type: Recording studio
- Industry: Music
- Founded: 1984 (42 years ago)
- Founder: John Mellencamp
- Headquarters: Belmont, Indiana, U.S.

Belmont Mall Studio is a recording studio in Belmont, Indiana, United States. Located on West Lower Schooner Road, it was founded in 1984 by John Mellencamp. Albums which have been recorded there include John Mellencamp's Scarecrow (1985) and R.E.M.'s Lifes Rich Pageant (1986). R.E.M. chose the studio because they wanted to work with Mellencamp's producer, Don Gehman, who built the studio.

Mellencamp has recorded every album since 1985's Scarecrow at Belmont Mall, with the exception of 2010's No Better Than This, which was recorded at three historic musical locations.

== Layout and design ==
The studio consists of two clapboard buildings around a pebbled courtyard. A sign on a parking space says it is "reserved for Elvis."

When designing the studio, Mellencamp wanted the control room to have the same look and feel as that of Studio B at Rumbo Recorders, a three-room building in Canoga Park, California.
