= Crumblin' Down =

Single by John Cougar Mellencamp

from the album Uh-Huh
- B-side: "Golden Gates"
- Released: October 1983
- Genre: Heartland rock
- Length: 3:33
- Label: Riva
- Songwriters: John Mellencamp, George Green
- Producers: John Mellencamp, Don Gehman

John Cougar Mellencamp singles chronology
"Hand to Hold on To" (1982)	"Crumblin' Down" (1983)	"Pink Houses" (1983)

"Crumblin' Down" is a rock song co-written and performed by John Cougar Mellencamp, released as the lead single from his 1983 album Uh-Huh. It was a top-ten hit on both the US Billboard Hot 100 and Canadian pop charts, and it reached #2 on the US Mainstream Rock charts.

== Background ==
"Crumblin' Down" was written by John Mellencamp and longtime writing partner George Green. It was the last song recorded for Uh-Huh; after listening to the masters for the other tracks recorded, Mellencamp decided that the album needed a song that would work as the album's lead single. He contacted Green, with whom he had previously written "Hurts So Good," to solicit ideas. Green had begun a song with lines about walls crumbling down; he and Mellencamp then built the song by trading lines, attempting to top one another.

According to Green, the song attempts to answer the question of what to do when success eventually fades, and "the big-time deal falls through." The song touches on Mellencamp's fame as well as the frustrations of losing one's livelihood: the lyrics were inspired, in part, by Mellencamp's cousin losing his job as an electrical engineer.

In a 2016 Mellencamp-dedicated exhibit at the Rock and Roll Hall of Fame, a display was emblazoned with the following quote from Mellencamp: "Crumblin' Down is a very political song that I wrote with my childhood friend George Green. Reagan was president - he was deregulating everything and the walls were crumbling down on the poor. The song was the last one recorded and the first single. It was a hit immediately. I felt like I was pulling the wool over everyone's eyes."

The video for "Crumblin' Down" received heavy play on MTV. It featured a chain-smoking Mellencamp in intentionally ripped denim jeans, dancing and kicking over chairs on a stage in an empty auditorium. As the video progresses, he dances among a row of parking meters, climbs and descends a tall stepladder, and gains a three-piece backing band as accompaniment for the final chorus. "Crumblin' Down" was the first single released by Mellencamp to include his real last name: previous releases were credited to "John Cougar."

"Crumblin' Down" was the lead single from Uh-Huh, following his previous hit single "Hand to Hold on To" (from 1982's American Fool) to the Billboard Top 40 on the Hot 100, where it debuted October 22, 1983. It peaked at number 9 on that chart and at number 2 on the Mainstream Rock chart.

"Crumblin' Down" is also included on Mellencamp's greatest hits compilations The Best That I Could Do 1978–1988 and Words & Music: John Mellencamp's Greatest Hits.

== Charts ==
=== Weekly charts ===
Chart (1983–1984)	Peak position
Argentina	7
Canada Top Singles (RPM)	9
US Billboard Hot 100	9
US Mainstream Rock (Billboard)	2

=== Year-end charts ===
Chart (1983)	Position
Canada Top Singles (RPM)	91

== Popular culture ==
- In the Season 2 of the hit 1980s TV series Knight Rider, an episode titled "White Line Warriors" features the song playing on the radio when burglaries in a small town take place.
