= Rumbleseat (John Mellencamp song) =

Single by John Cougar Mellencamp

from the album Scarecrow
- B-side: "Cold Sweat"
- Released: June 1986
- Recorded: 1985
- Studio: Belmont Mall Studio (Belmont, Indiana)
- Genre: Heartland rock, rockabilly
- Length: 2:59
- Label: Riva
- Songwriter: John Mellencamp
- Producers: John Mellencamp, Don Gehman

John Cougar Mellencamp singles chronology
"Rain on the Scarecrow" (1986)	"Rumbleseat" (1986)	"Paper in Fire" (1987)

"Rumbleseat" is a song by American singer-songwriter John Mellencamp. It was released in June 1986 as the fifth single from his eighth studio album, Scarecrow (1985). The song peaked at number 28 on the Billboard Hot 100 and number 4 on the Billboard Album Rock Tracks chart.

== Background and release ==
"Rumbleseat" was issued as a 7-inch single. Its B-side was a cover of "Cold Sweat" by James Brown.

== Critical reception ==
Cash Box said that "the distinctive, rocking style of Mellencamp is put to great effect." Billboard described it as "stripped down rockabilly with a moral to it."

== Music video ==
The music video for "Rumbleseat", it was directed by Mellencamp himself and was aired on MTV.

== Charts ==
Chart (1986)	Peak position
US Billboard Hot 100	28
US Mainstream Rock (Billboard)	4

== Track listing ==
7-inch single

- A-side: "Rumbleseat" – 2:59
- B-side: "Cold Sweat" – 3:23

== Personnel ==
- John Mellencamp – vocals, acoustic guitar
- Kenny Aronoff – drums
- Larry Crane – guitar
- Mike Wanchic – guitar
- Toby Myers – bass
- John Cascella – keyboards

== See also ==
- Heartland rock
