= No Better Than This =

Studio album by John Mellencamp
- Released: August 17, 2010
- Recorded: July and August 2009
- Studio: First African Baptist Church, Savannah, Georgia; Sun Studio, Memphis, Tennessee; Gunter Hotel, San Antonio, Texas
- Genre: Americana; country blues; heartland rock
- Length: 53:50
- Label: Rounder
- Producer: T Bone Burnett

John Mellencamp chronology
On the Rural Route 7609 (2010)	No Better Than This (2010)	Performs Trouble No More Live at Town Hall (2014)

Professional ratings
Aggregate scores
Source	Rating
Metacritic	(78/100)
Review scores
Source	Rating
AllMusic	4/5 stars
American Songwriter	4.5/5 stars
Chatham Daily News	4/4 stars
Chicago Tribune	3.5/4 stars
Entertainment Weekly	A−
Los Angeles Times	3.5/4 stars
Metro Canada	4.5/5 stars
PopMatters	9/10 stars
Rolling Stone	3.5/5 stars
Salt Lake Tribune	B+
Slant Magazine	3.5/5 stars
Toronto Sun	4/5 stars
USA Today	3.5/4 stars

No Better Than This is the 21st album by American singer-songwriter and musician John Mellencamp. Produced by T Bone Burnett, the album was released on August 17, 2010. It was recorded at several historic locations throughout the United States. The title track was the album's first single and was sent to multiple radio formats on June 28, 2010.

Mellencamp said that the album is "as American folk as I've ever been". He also told Rolling Stone in July 2009 that he is not concerned whether or not there's a large audience for such a raw, simple record. "I am done being a rock star", Mellencamp said. "I have no interest in that, in having the biggest concerts. I have only one interest: to have fun while we're doing this and maybe have something that somebody might discover."

Rolling Stone placed No Better Than This at No. 12 on its list of the best albums of 2010.

== Recording and production ==
Mellencamp wrote over 30 songs for potential inclusion on the album but only 13 made the final cut. He debuted the first of those, "Save Some Time to Dream", on May 17, 2009, at a political fundraiser for President Barack Obama at the Westin Hotel in downtown Indianapolis. "It's about individual freedom and thought—and controlling our own lives", Mellencamp said of "Save Some Time to Dream", which he performed solo on acoustic guitar throughout much of his 2009 summer tour with Bob Dylan and Willie Nelson.

During breaks on the Nelson/Dylan tour, Mellencamp recorded No Better Than This at historic locations, such as the First African Baptist Church in Savannah, Georgia, as well as at the historic Sun Studios in Memphis and the Sheraton Gunter Hotel in San Antonio, where blues pioneer Robert Johnson recorded blues staples such as "Sweet Home Chicago" and "Cross Road Blues". Mellencamp recorded the album using a 1955 Ampex portable recording machine and only one microphone, requiring all the musicians to gather together around the mic. The album was recorded in mono, the same manner as the classic folk and blues recordings of the 1930s and 1940s.

Mellencamp wrote one song specifically for Room 414 at the Gunter Hotel, which is the exact room where Johnson recorded in November 1936. He told the San Antonio Express-News, "It's called 'Right Behind Me' or 'Right Behind Us,' I haven't decided yet. I wrote it just for this room. I could have done this in my studio. But I want to do it this way, and if I can't do what I want at this point, I'm not going to do it. If it's not fun, I'm not going to do it. I'm through digging a ditch".

"John is a really great singer and I'm always happy working with him in any environment", T Bone Burnett told the Express-News. "The fact he chose these historic locations is a big plus. The stories that have come out of the sessions are extraordinary. The First African Baptist Church was started in 1775. It was an important stop on the Underground Railroad and central to the civil rights movement. Sun Studio, from a completely different angle, was also important to the civil rights movement and, from another angle, so were Robert Johnson's recordings at the Gunter."

During Mellencamp's session at Sun Studios in late July 2009, he recorded several songs including "Each Day of Sorrow", "No One Cares About Me", "The West End", and "Easter Eve", which Rolling Stone magazine's David Fricke compared to "one of Bob Dylan's talking blues". Regarding this session, Mellencamp told the magazine, "[T Bone] and I were laughing. We got five songs here last night. We asked ourselves, 'What the fuck were we doing in the 70s and 80s, spending days and days on a drum sound, when it was all right here the whole time?'"

"Everything was set up exactly as Johnny Cash and Elvis Presley recorded. They had 'X' marks made with electrical tape on the floor where Elvis and his musicians stood and where the instruments were placed, because Sam Philips walked around the room and decided where everything sounded best".

Mellencamp wanted to record at the now-derelict Brunswick Records Building in Dallas, where Robert Johnson cut his final sessions in 1937, but the current owner of the building denied him permission to record there.

As for the organic recording process of the album, Mellencamp says it's unique for this day and age. "The same mic I was singing into is the same mic that recorded the drums at the same time," Mellencamp said on his website. "And everything was cut live with no overdubs or studio nothing! These are real songs being performed by real musicians—an unheard-of process in today's world. Real music, for real people!"

Mellencamp has said in interviews to promote the album that the song "The West End" is not about a certain part of town but rather about America, which is the west end of the world.

== Promotion and release ==
The album was released on August 17, 2010, on the Rounder Records label.

Mellencamp gave the first live performance of the song "Save Some Time to Dream" for a concert audience on July 10, 2009, in Dayton, Ohio. He subsequently performed the song at several other concerts, including Farm Aid 2009 and a tribute to Myles Brand at Conseco Fieldhouse. He has also completed a painting entitled "Save Some Time to Dream".

In October 2009, it was announced that a song recorded during the sessions for the album, entitled "Someday the Rains Will Fall", would be featured in an episode of NCIS and would appear on the album NCIS: The Official TV Soundtrack – Vol. 2. "Someday the Rains Will Fall" is not included on No Better Than This, but it is found on Mellencamp's four-disc box set, On the Rural Route 7609.

The album's first single, "No Better Than This", was released to radio stations on June 28, 2010.

== Film ==
Mellencamp's 2009 summer tour of minor league baseball parks with Willie Nelson and Bob Dylan and the recording sessions for this album were filmed by renowned photographer Kurt Markus, who released a documentary titled John Mellencamp: It's About You that premiered in New York City and Los Angeles in January 2012 and was released on DVD and Blu-ray in June 2012. "It's not about me but about Kurt being with me—which is a whole different slant than these kinds of movies usually have", Mellencamp said. Markus had previously directed the music video for Mellencamp's 2001 single "Peaceful World". Mellencamp showed "It's About You" before his performance each night during his 2010–2011 No Better Than This theater tour, which began on October 29, 2010, in his hometown of Bloomington, Indiana.

== Track listing ==
All songs written by John Mellencamp.

1. "Save Some Time to Dream" – 4:30
2. "The West End" – 3:58
3. "Right Behind Me" – 4:00
4. "A Graceful Fall" – 3:20
5. "No Better Than This" – 3:12
6. "Thinking About You" – 3:28
7. "Coming Down the Road" – 4:45
8. "No One Cares About Me" – 6:11
9. "Love at First Sight" – 4:37
10. "Don't Forget About Me" – 3:14
11. "Each Day of Sorrow" – 2:36
12. "Easter Eve" – 6:30
13. "Clumsy Ol' World" – 3:29

== Personnel ==
- John Mellencamp – vocals and acoustic guitar
- Andy York – acoustic and electric guitars
- Marc Ribot – electric guitar and banjo
- T Bone Burnett – acoustic and electric guitars
- David Roe – bass
- Jay Bellerose – drums and percussion
- Miriam Sturm – violin

== Charts ==
Chart performance for No Better Than This
Chart (2010)	Peak position
Australian Albums (ARIA)	83
Dutch Albums (Album Top 100)	93
German Albums (Offizielle Top 100)	62
Italian Albums (FIMI)	47
Norwegian Albums (VG-lista)	29
Swedish Albums (Sverigetopplistan)	33
Swiss Albums (Schweizer Hitparade)	83
UK Albums (OCC)	25
US Billboard 200	10
US Top Rock Albums (Billboard)	5
