= Scarecrow (John Mellencamp album) =

Studio album by John Cougar Mellencamp
- Released: July 31, 1985
- Studio: Belmont Mall Studio (Belmont, Indiana)
- Genres: Heartland rock; folk rock; roots rock
- Length: 41:07
- Label: Riva
- Producers: John Mellencamp; Don Gehman

John Cougar Mellencamp chronology
Uh-Huh (1983)	Scarecrow (1985)	The Lonesome Jubilee (1987)

Singles from Scarecrow
- 1. "Lonely Ol' Night" Released: August 1985; 2. "Small Town" Released: November 2, 1985; 3. "R.O.C.K. in the U.S.A." Released: January 1986; 4. "Rain on the Scarecrow" Released: April 1986; 5. "Rumbleseat" Released: June 1986

Professional ratings
Review scores
Source	Rating
AllMusic	4.5/5 stars
Kerrang!	5/5 stars
Pitchfork	8.1/10
Robert Christgau	B+
Rolling Stone	(favorable)
The Rolling Stone Album Guide	4/5 stars

Scarecrow is the eighth studio album by American singer-songwriter John Cougar Mellencamp. Released on July 31, 1985, it peaked at number two on the US Billboard 200. The album contained three top-ten hits: "R.O.C.K. in the U.S.A.", which peaked at No. 2 on the US Billboard Hot 100; "Lonely Ol' Night", which peaked at number six; and "Small Town", which also peaked at number six. "Lonely Ol' Night" also peaked at number one on the Mainstream Rock Tracks chart, his second chart-topping single on this chart.

In The Village Voice's annual Pazz & Jop critics poll for the year's best albums, Scarecrow finished at No. 3. In 1989, Rolling Stone magazine ranked Scarecrow number 95 on its list of the 100 greatest albums of the 1980s, saying: "Scarecrow consolidated the band's rugged, roots-rock thrash and the ongoing maturation of Mellencamp's lyrics."

A remastered version was released May 24, 2005, on Mercury/Island/UMe and includes one bonus track. On November 4, 2022, a "deluxe" two-CD remastered and remixed version of the album was released.

== Background ==
Rolling Stone also reported that John Cougar Mellencamp's band spent a month in rehearsals, playing a hundred rock and roll songs from the 1960s before going into the studio. According to the record's producer, Don Gehman, the idea was to "learn all these devices from the past and use them in a new way with John's arrangements." The album was recorded at Mellencamp's own Belmont Mall Studio in Belmont, Indiana.

The overall theme of the album is the fading of the American Dream in the face of corporate greed. Rolling Stone wrote that songs such as "Face of the Nation", "Minutes to Memories" and "Small Town" have a "bittersweet, reflective tone".

In his 2016 Rock and Roll Hall of Fame exhibit, Mellencamp said: "With Scarecrow, I was finally starting to find my feet as a songwriter. Finally, for the first time, I realized what I thought I wanted to say in song. ...I wanted it to be more akin to Tennessee Williams, John Steinbeck, Faulkner, as opposed to The Rolling Stones or Bob Dylan."

== Songs ==
"I wrote a song called 'Stand for Something'," Mellencamp explained to Creem magazine in late 1985, "but I never did say what you should stand for – except your own truth. That song was supposed to be funny, too, and I hope people got that. But I think that's the key to the whole LP – suggesting that each person come to grips with their own individual truth – and try to like themselves a little bit more. Find out what you as a person are – and don't let the world drag you down. People should have respect for and believe in themselves."

Mellencamp told Creem that he was "kinda disappointed" in "R.O.C.K. In The U.S.A." and "Justice and Independence '85", saying: "I don't think people are getting the idea of what the song's about, so I must've not done a very good job."

Cash Box said of the single "Rain on the Scarecrow" that it's "solid, riveting rock and roll from an American treasure" and represents an "impassioned plea on behalf of America’s small farmers." Billboard said it consists of "raw rage and bleak visions of a disintegrating way of life."

Cash Box said of the single "Rumbleseat" that "the distinctive, rocking style of Mellencamp is put to great effect." Billboard said that it's "stripped down rockabilly with a moral to it."

The 2005 remaster of the album adds an additional track: an acoustic version of "Small Town" that one reviewer calls the album's "best moment". The 2022 remastered and remixed version of the album on CD includes all of the 13 tracks of the 2005 remaster as its first disc. A second disc of b-sides, demos and alternative versions, some previously unreleased, is also included. A simultaneous release of these songs was also made in 24bit-96 kHz high-resolution audio. The album was also released on one LP with the 11 tracks of the original LP plus "The Kind Of Fella I Am". New liner notes by music critic Anthony DeCurtis accompany the physical releases.

== Track listing ==
All songs written by John Mellencamp, except where noted.

=== Original release ===
Side one
No.	Title	Length
1.	"Rain on the Scarecrow" (Mellencamp, George M. Green)	3:46
2.	"Grandma's Theme" (traditional (Note: "Grandma's Theme" is the first verse of the 1896 song "In The Baggage Coach Ahead" with lyrics and music by Gussie L. Davis.))	0:56
3.	"Small Town"	3:41
4.	"Minutes to Memories" (Mellencamp, Green)	4:11
5.	"Lonely Ol' Night"	3:45
6.	"The Face of the Nation"	3:13

Side two
No.	Title	Length
7.	"Justice and Independence '85"	3:32
8.	"Between a Laugh and a Tear"	4:32
9.	"Rumbleseat"	2:58
10.	"You've Got to Stand for Somethin'"	4:32
11.	"R.O.C.K. in the U.S.A. (A Salute to 60's Rock)"	2:54

Cassette and CD bonus track
No.	Title	Length
12.	"The Kind of Fella I Am" ( (Note: "The Kind of Fella I Am" also appears as the B-side to "Lonely Ol' Night".))	2:55

=== Re-releases ===
2005 remastered and expanded edition
No.	Title	Length
13.	"Small Town" (acoustic version)	4:14

2022 remastered and remixed deluxe edition – disc two
No.	Title	Length
1.	"Under the Boardwalk" (Kenny Young, Arthur Resnick)	3:54
2.	"Lonely Ol' Night" (Rough Mix)	3:48
3.	"Between a Laugh and a Tear" (Writer's Demo)	1:15
4.	"Carolina Shag"	3:34
5.	"Cold Sweat" (James Brown, Alfred Ellis)	3:25
6.	"Rumbleseat (Writer's Demo)"	2:00
7.	"Smart Guys"	3:07
8.	"R.O.C.K. in the U.S.A. (A Salute to 60's Rock)" (Rough Mix)	2:47
9.	"Minutes to Memories" (Rough Mix)	4:13
10.	"Shama Lama Ding Dong" (Mark Davis)	3:21
11.	"Small Town (Writer's Demo)"	1:21

== Personnel ==
- John Mellencamp – vocals, guitar, harmonica on "Small Town"
- Larry Crane – electric guitars, acoustic guitars, backing vocals
- Kenny Aronoff – drums, tambourine, vibes, backing vocals
- Mike Wanchic – electric guitars, backing vocals
- Toby Myers – electric bass, backing vocals
- John Cascella – keyboards
- Rickie Lee Jones – vocals on "Between a Laugh and a Tear"
- Sarah Flint – background vocals on "R.O.C.K. in the U.S.A."
- Laura Mellencamp (John Mellencamp's grandmother) – lead vocal on "Grandma's Theme"
- Mimi Mapes – backing vocals on "Minutes to Memories"
- A. Jack Wilkins – saxophone on "Justice and Independence '85"
- Richard Fanning – trumpet on "Justice and Independence '85"
- Ry Cooder – slide guitar on "The Kind of Fella I Am"

== Charts ==
=== Weekly charts ===
Weekly chart performance for Scarecrow
Chart (1985–1986)	Peak position
Australian Albums (Kent Music Report)	2
Canada Top Albums/CDs (RPM)	2
Dutch Albums (Album Top 100)	71
New Zealand Albums (RMNZ)	14
Swedish Albums (Sverigetopplistan)	9
US Billboard 200	2

=== Year-end charts ===
Year-end chart performance for Scarecrow
Chart (1985)	Position
Canada Top Albums/CDs (RPM)	14
Chart (1986)	Position
Canada Top Albums/CDs (RPM)	19
US Billboard 200	3

== Certifications ==
Certifications for Scarecrow
Region	Certification	Certified units/sales
Australia (ARIA)	4× Platinum	280,000^{^}
Canada (Music Canada)	5× Platinum	500,000^{^}
United States (RIAA)	5× Platinum	5,000,000^{^}
^{^} Shipments figures based on certification alone.
