= Small Town =

Single by John Cougar Mellencamp

from the album Scarecrow
- B-side: "Small Town" (acoustic version)
- Released: November 1985
- Recorded: 1985
- Studio: Belmont Mall Studio (Belmont, Indiana)
- Genre: Heartland rock; folk rock
- Length: 3:42
- Label: Riva Records
- Songwriter: John Mellencamp
- Producers: John Mellencamp; Don Gehman

John Cougar Mellencamp singles chronology
"Lonely Ol' Night" (1985)	"Small Town" (1985)	"R.O.C.K. in the U.S.A." (1986)

"Small Town" is a 1985 song written and recorded by John Mellencamp and released on his eighth album Scarecrow. The song reached number 6 on the US Billboard Hot 100 chart and number 13 on the Adult Contemporary chart.

== Content ==
John Cougar Mellencamp wrote the song about his experiences growing up in a small town in Indiana, having been born in Seymour, Indiana, and living in Bloomington, Indiana, which, at the time of the release of the song, was larger. The music video has references to both towns. The song highlights the strong sense of community and shared values that can characterize a small town.

== Backstory ==
"I wrote that song in the laundry room of my old house," Mellencamp told American Songwriter magazine in 2004. "We had company, and I had to go write the song. And the people upstairs could hear me writing and they were all laughing when I came up. They said, 'You've got to be kidding.' What else can you say about it?" Mellencamp later told The Wall Street Journal that he had written the lyrics using an electronic typewriter that beeped whenever he misspelled a word, which had amused the people listening upstairs; however, they were silenced when he played the song to them. In 2013, Mellencamp told Rolling Stone, "I wanted to write a song that said, 'You don't have to live in New York or Los Angeles to live a full life or enjoy your life.' I was never one of those guys that grew up and thought, 'I need to get out of here.' It never dawned on me. I just valued having a family and staying close to friends."

== Reception ==
Cash Box called it "a rocking homage to the small town of the artist’s life and the small towns of America," saying that it is "infectious, meaningful and especially topical."

== Charts ==
=== Weekly charts ===
Chart (1985–1986)	Peak position
Australia (Australian Music Report)	80
Canada (RPM)	13
United Kingdom (Top 100)	53
U.S. Billboard Hot 100	6
U.S. Billboard Top Rock Tracks	2
U.S. Billboard Adult Contemporary	13
New Zealand (Top 50)	40

=== Year-end charts ===
Chart (1986)	Rank
US Top Pop Singles (Billboard)	72

== Certifications ==
Region	Certification	Certified units/sales
New Zealand (RMNZ)	Platinum	30,000^{‡}
^{‡} Sales+streaming figures based on certification alone.

== In popular culture ==
In February 2020, the Michael Bloomberg 2020 presidential campaign released a campaign advertisement pitched at small American towns with declining economies, backed by Mellencamp singing "Small Town".

Minnesota governor and 2024 vice presidential candidate Tim Walz used the song as his walk-on theme for rallies during the 2024 election, as a reference to his roots in small-town Nebraska.
