= George Green (songwriter) =

American songwriter

- Born: George Michael Green; January 28, 1952; Seymour, Indiana, U.S.
- Died: August 28, 2011 (aged 59) Albuquerque, New Mexico, U.S.
- Genres: Rock, heartland rock, roots rock, folk rock
- Occupation: Songwriter

George Michael Green (January 28, 1952 – August 28, 2011) was an American songwriter. His collaborations with his childhood friend John Mellencamp include the top 10 Billboard hits "Crumblin' Down" and "Hurts So Good", as well as "Key West Intermezzo (I Saw You First)", a No. 1 hit in Canada.

== Career ==
Green was John Mellencamp's long-time writing partner. He was a classmate and childhood friend of Mellencamp's from Seymour, Indiana. In 1985, Green's wife appeared in the video for Mellencamp's top 10 hit "Lonely Ol' Night". In addition to writing with Mellencamp, Green also wrote songs recorded by Barbra Streisand, Level 42, Hall & Oates, Jude Cole, Vanessa Williams, Percy Sledge, Gary Morris, and the Oak Ridge Boys among others.

=== Credits ===
Green's songwriting credits with Mellencamp include:

- "Dream Killing Town" and "Sad Lady" from Chestnut Street Incident (1976)
- "Hurts So Good" (#2 Billboard hit) and "Thundering Hearts" from American Fool (1982)
- "Crumblin' Down" (#9 Billboard hit) and "Warmer Place to Sleep" from Uh-Huh (1983)
- "Rain on the Scarecrow" (#21 Billboard hit) and "Minutes to Memories" from Scarecrow (1985)
- "Empty Hands" from The Lonesome Jubilee (1987)
- "Human Wheels" from Human Wheels (1993)
- "Another Sunny Day 12/25", "The Big Jack" and "The Breakout" from Dance Naked (1994)
- "Key West Intermezzo (I Saw You First)" (#14 Billboard hit), "This May Not Be the End of the World" and "Circling Around the Moon" from Mr. Happy Go Lucky (1996)
- "Your Life Is Now", "Positively Crazy", "It All Comes True", "Where the World Began" and "Break Me Off Some" from John Mellencamp (1998)

Green's songwriting credits with Carla Olson include:

- "The Grand Blvd." recorded by Percy Sledge on his 1994 album Blue Night
- "Secret Graves" which Olson included on her 1988 self-titled album a.k.a. Sweden USA
- "The Bell Hotel Is Burning" on the 2023 album Night Comes Falling by Stephen McCarthy and Olson (McCarthy is the third writer of the song)

== Death ==
Green died on August 28, 2011, in Albuquerque, New Mexico at the age of 59 after suffering from a rapid-forming small cell lung cancer.
