= Trouble No More (John Mellencamp album) =

Studio album by John Mellencamp
- Released: June 3, 2003
- Recorded: February 10–27, 2003
- Genre: Rock; heartland rock; blues; folk rock
- Length: 47:11
- Label: Columbia
- Producer: John Mellencamp

John Mellencamp chronology
Cuttin' Heads (2001)	Trouble No More (2003)	Words & Music: John Mellencamp's Greatest Hits (2004)

Professional ratings
Aggregate scores
Source	Rating
Metacritic	(68/100)
Review scores
Source	Rating
AllMusic	3.5/5 stars
Blender	3.5/5 stars
Entertainment Weekly	B+
PopMatters	6/10 stars
Robert Christgau	(dud)
Rolling Stone	3/5 stars
Uncut	2/5 stars
USA Today	3/4 stars

Trouble No More is American singer-songwriter and musician John Mellencamp's 18th studio album and his final recording for Columbia Records, released in 2003. It consists of blues and folk covers.

A re-working of "To Washington" featuring new lyrics critical of President George W. Bush and the Iraq War, generated much controversy upon the album's release.

In addition to the album, a documentary titled Trouble No More: The Making of a John Mellencamp Album was produced and directed by Ron Osgood, along with students from his documentary course at Indiana University. The documentary won a Regional Emmy and several small festival awards in 2004 and 2005.

== Track listing ==
1. "Stones in My Passway" (Robert Johnson) – 3:17
2. "Death Letter" (Son House) – 6:14
3. "Johnny Hart" (Woody Guthrie) – 4:31
4. "Baltimore Oriole" (Hoagy Carmichael, Paul Francis Webster) – 3:54
5. "Teardrops Will Fall" (Dicky Doo, Marion Smith) – 4:24
6. "Diamond Joe" (Traditional; new lyrics by Mellencamp) – 4:37
7. "The End of the World" (Sylvia Dee, Arthur Kent) – 3:24
8. "Down in the Bottom" (Willie Dixon) – 3:31
9. "Lafayette" (Lucinda Williams) – 3:55
10. "Joliet Bound" (Kansas Joe McCoy, Memphis Minnie) – 3:34
11. "John the Revelator" (Traditional) – 3:19
12. "To Washington" (Traditional; new lyrics by Mellencamp) – 2:39

== Personnel ==
=== Musicians ===
- John Mellencamp – vocals, guitar
- Andy York – guitars, bass
- Dane Clark – drums, percussion
- Miriam Sturm – violin, viola
- Michael Ramos – accordion, organ
- Toby Myers – upright bass
- John Gunnell – electric bass
- Pat Peterson – background vocals, tambourine
- Courtney Kaiser – background vocals, tambourine
- Heather Headley – background vocals
- Janas Hoyt – background vocals
- Michael Clark – pedal steel
- T. Blayde – kazoo

=== DVD ===
- Producer and Director: Ron Osgood
- Associate Producer: Will Deloney
- Assistant Directors: Matt Bockelman, Brian Rogat
- Head Writer: Chris Booker
- Senior Photographer: Ron Prickel
- Location Sound: Stuart Notion
- Graphics and Effects: Abbie Harmon, Scott Carmichael
- Post-Production Sound: Charlie Hoyt
- Special Thanks: Indiana University
- Booklet Photos: Elaine Mellencamp
- Design: Design Monsters
- Management: Hoffman Entertainment

== Charts ==
Album – Billboard (United States)

Year	Chart	Position
June 21, 2003	The Billboard 200	31
