= Check It Out (John Mellencamp song) =

Single by John Cougar Mellencamp

from the album The Lonesome Jubilee
- B-side: "We Are the People"
- Released: 1988
- Studio: Belmont Mall (Indiana, US)
- Genre: Heartland rock
- Length: 4:19
- Label: Mercury
- Songwriter: John Mellencamp
- Producers: John Mellencamp, Don Gehman

John Cougar Mellencamp singles chronology
"Cherry Bomb" (1987)	"Check It Out" (1988)	"Rooty Toot Toot" (1988)

"Check It Out" is a 1987 song by John Mellencamp released as the third single from his album The Lonesome Jubilee in 1988. The single was a top 20 hit, reaching number 14 on the Billboard Hot 100.

== Lyrics and music ==
According to Mellencamp biographer David Masciotra, the song "describes the rewards and punishments of a typical American middle-class family" and professes that "our attempts to solve the mysteries of the heart and grasp the truth of humanity are fraught with disaster and disappointment." Mellencamp biographer Paul Rees called its sound "uplifting".

== Reception ==
Cash Box said that Mellencamp's rough county-ish feel takes you into the heartland [of America]" and that the song "features a nice instrumental hook line that sounds like an otherworldly bagpipe and leads into the verses."

Masciotra calls it "a uniquely powerful testament to the mystery of inner life".

== Music video ==
The video was shot as a live performance at Market Square Arena in Indianapolis on December 11, 1987, during Mellencamp's massive Lonesome Jubilee tour.

== Charts ==
Chart (1987–1988)	Peak position
Italy Airplay (Music & Media)	16
US Cashbox	14
US Billboard Hot 100	14
