= Rain on the Scarecrow =

Single by John Cougar Mellencamp

from the album Scarecrow
- B-side: "You've Got to Stand for Somethin'"
- Released: 1986
- Recorded: 1985
- Studio: Belmont Mall Studio (Belmont, Indiana)
- Genre: Rock and roll; heartland rock
- Length: 3:46
- Label: Riva
- Songwriters: John Mellencamp, George M. Green
- Producers: John Mellencamp, Don Gehman

John Cougar Mellencamp singles chronology
"R.O.C.K. in the U.S.A." (1986)	"Rain on the Scarecrow" (1986)	"Rumbleseat" (1986)

"Rain on the Scarecrow" is a song by American singer-songwriter John Cougar Mellencamp, released in 1985 as the fourth single from his eighth studio album, Scarecrow. The song reached number 21 on the Billboard Hot 100 and was notable for its powerful social commentary on the collapse of rural farming communities in the United States during the 1980s.

== Background and themes ==
Written by John Cougar Mellencamp and lyricist George M. Green, "Rain on the Scarecrow" reflects the economic and emotional toll of the 1980s farm crisis and the wave of farm foreclosures affecting Midwestern farmers. Released in 1986 during the 1980s U.S. farm crisis, the song is a vivid narrative about generational loss, pride, and despair. Mellencamp later explained that the song was a response to what he saw happening in Indiana and across America.

== Composition and style ==
The song blends elements of heartland rock with stark lyrical storytelling. Built on minor-key guitar riffs and atmospheric keyboards, it features urgent vocal delivery and vivid imagery. Lines such as “This land fed a nation, this land made me proud” underscore the broader cultural identity of the American family farm.

== Critical reception ==
Cash Box said of the single that it's "solid, riveting rock and roll from an American treasure" and called it an "impassioned plea on behalf of America's small farmers." Billboard said it consists of "raw rage and bleak visions of a disintegrating way of life."

== Charts ==
Chart (1986)	Peak position
US Billboard Hot 100	21

== Legacy ==
"Rain on the Scarecrow" is widely regarded as one of his most socially resonant songs. It is often cited alongside Bruce Springsteen's "The River" and Neil Young's "Rockin’ in the Free World" as part of a canon of 1980s protest songs rooted in working-class struggle.

== Track listing ==
7" single

- A-side: "Rain on the Scarecrow" – 3:46
- B-side: "You've Got to Stand for Somethin'" – 4:32

== See also ==
- Heartland rock
- Farm Aid
