= Uh-huh =

Uh-Huh

Studio album by John Cougar Mellencamp
- Released: October 25, 1983
- Recorded: Jackson County, Indiana; July 1983
- Genres: Rock; heartland rock
- Length: 32:59
- Label: Riva
- Producers: John Mellencamp; Don Gehman

John Cougar Mellencamp chronology
The Kid Inside (1983)	Uh-Huh (1983)	Scarecrow (1985)

Singles from Uh-Huh
- 1. "Crumblin' Down" Released: 1983; 2. "Pink Houses" Released: 1983; 3. "Serious Business" Released: 1984; 4. "Play Guitar" Released: 1984; 5. "Authority Song" Released: 1984

Professional ratings
Review scores
Source	Rating
AllMusic	4.5/5 stars
Robert Christgau	B
Rolling Stone	4/5 stars

Uh-Huh is a 1983 album by John Cougar Mellencamp and a transition from his early work under the names Johnny Cougar and John Cougar. It was Mellencamp's seventh studio album and the first in which he used his real last name. It charted at No. 9 on the Billboard 200.

Uh-Huh contains three top 20 Billboard Hot 100 hits: "Crumblin' Down" (No. 9), "Pink Houses" (No. 8), and "Authority Song" (No. 15). In 1989, it was ranked No. 32 on Rolling Stone magazine's list of the 100 Greatest Albums of the '80s.

The remastered version was released on March 29, 2005 on Mercury/Island/UMe and includes one bonus track.

== Songwriting collaborations ==
John Mellencamp almost always writes all of his own material. However, Uh-Huh saw him engage in one-time collaborations with two distinctly different songwriters: the well-known John Prine on "Jackie O", and the unknown Will Cary on "Lovin' Mother fo Ya".

Of "Jackie O", Mellencamp said on The Bob & Tom Show in November 2004: "I can't take credit – John Prine wrote most of that song."

Mellencamp had written "Lovin' Mother fo Ya" and was playing it live on his 1982 American Fool Tour before it was even recorded (and before Cary had anything to do with the song). According to a 2003 article on LouisvilleMusic.com, Cary sent Mellencamp's guitarist Mike Wanchic a copy of Out of My Dreams, an album he had recorded with his band the Nightcrawlers. Out of My Dreams contained a song called "Cruisin' in the Park", which Mellencamp liked. This led to a phone call regarding Mellencamp's wanting to record "Cruisin' in the Park" as the first single from Uh-Huh. Cary recalled, "He ended up using the fourth verse from my song to start his song, 'Lovin Mother fo Ya'." A writing-credit deal was signed and Cary got 15% royalties for that song.

In addition, Mellencamp turned a song his hairdresser Dan Ross (also lead singer in a local Indiana band) had started into "Play Guitar". Mellencamp's guitar player, Larry Crane, added to the music of "Play Guitar", which has numerous musical similarities to Van Morrison's "Gloria".

== Songs ==
Cash Box reviewed the single release of "Authority Song", writing, "Opening with a twanging country riff, this rocker jumps off the vinyl with the authority that Cougar-Mellencamp is singing against: 'I fight authority, and authority always wins!'" Cash Box especially praised the "pounding rhythm section and percussion work."

Cash Box also said that "with a resounding bass line and lyrics that bite, 'Serious Business' is the kind of all-out rocking that Mellencamp makes his own as he renders some of the finest rock artistry around."

== Track listing ==
All songs written by John Mellencamp; except where noted.

1. "Crumblin' Down" (Mellencamp, George Green) – 3:33
2. "Pink Houses" – 4:43
3. "Authority Song" – 3:49
4. "Warmer Place to Sleep" (Mellencamp, Green) – 3:48
5. "Jackie O" (Mellencamp, John Prine) – 3:04
6. "Play Guitar" (Larry Crane, Mellencamp, Dan Ross) – 3:25
7. "Serious Business" – 3:25
8. "Lovin' Mother fo Ya" (Will Cary, Mellencamp) – 3:06
9. "Golden Gates" – 4:04
10. "Pink Houses" (acoustic version, 2005 re-issue bonus track) – 3:45

== Personnel ==
- John Mellencamp – vocals, guitar, tambourine
- Larry Crane – guitar
- Kenny Aronoff – drums, percussion
- Toby Myers – bass
- Mike Wanchic – guitar, background vocals
- Louis Johnson – bass
- Caroll Sue Hill – vocals
- Maggie Ryder – vocals
- Jay Ferguson – vocals

== Charts ==
=== Weekly charts ===
Chart (1984)	Peak position
Australian (Kent Music Report)	57
Canada Top Albums/CDs (RPM)	9
Swedish Albums (Sverigetopplistan)	24
UK Albums (Official Charts)	92
US Billboard 200	9

=== Year-end charts ===
Chart (1984)	Position
Canada Top Albums/CDs (RPM)	47
US Billboard 200	19

== Certifications ==
Certifications for Uh-huh
Region	Certification	Certified units/sales
Canada (Music Canada)	5× Platinum	500,000^{^}
United States (RIAA)	3× Platinum	3,000,000^{^}
^{^} Shipments figures based on certification alone.
