= Paper in Fire =

1987 single by John Cougar Mellencamp

Single by John Cougar Mellencamp

from the album The Lonesome Jubilee
- B-side: "Never Too Old"
- Released: August 15, 1987
- Studio: Belmont Mall (Indiana, US)
- Genre: Heartland rock; roots rock; country rock
- Length: 3:51
- Label: Mercury
- Songwriter: John Mellencamp
- Producers: John Mellencamp; Don Gehman

John Cougar Mellencamp singles chronology
| "Rumbleseat" (1986) | "Paper in Fire" (1987) | "Cherry Bomb" (1987) |

"Paper in Fire" is a song by American rock singer John Mellencamp, released on August 15, 1987, as the first single from his ninth studio album The Lonesome Jubilee. The song was a commercial success, reaching number nine on the US Billboard Hot 100 chart and number one on the Billboard Album Rock Tracks chart. It was also successful in Canada, where it topped The Record's singles chart and peaked at number three on the RPM 100 Singles chart.

The song received a music video that was directed by Jonathan Dark, produced by Priscilla French, and filmed by Vivid Productions in Savannah, Georgia.

== Background and composition ==
Mellencamp biographer David Masciotra called "Paper in Fire" a "ferocious song" that is the "aural equivalent of a wild beast breaking out of its cage." Masciotra describes it as having a libertarian theme. Mellencamp has said that the song is about his uncle Joe Mellencamp, who could be cruel to others and his own worst enemy, saying that "'Paper in Fire' is about Joe, and the family's ingrained anger...It is tragic when families don't grow up."

== Critical reception ==
Cash Box said that "AOR will undoubtedly benefit from this one - as will Top 40 radio, music video saturation is guaranteed." Billboard called the song a "quick-paced roots-rocker".

== Track listings ==
7-inch single

1. "Paper in Fire" – 3:53
2. "Never Too Old" – 3:45

CDV single

1. "Paper in Fire" – 3:48
2. "Never Too Old" – 3:43
3. "Under the Boardwalk" – 3:51
4. "Cold Sweat" – 3:23
5. "Paper in Fire" (video) – 3:57

== Charts ==
=== Weekly charts ===
| Chart (1987) | Peak position |
|---|---|
| Australia (Australian Music Report) | 13 |
| Canada (The Record) | 1 |
| Canada Top Singles (RPM) | 3 |
| Netherlands (Dutch Top 40) | 30 |
| Netherlands (Single Top 100) | 29 |
| New Zealand (Recorded Music NZ) | 16 |
| South Africa (Springbok Radio) | 8 |
| UK Singles (Official Charts) | 86 |
| US Billboard Hot 100 | 9 |
| US Mainstream Rock (Billboard) | 1 |
| US Cash Box Top 100 | 10 |

=== Year-end charts ===
| Chart (1987) | Position |
|---|---|
| Australia (Australian Music Report) | 79 |
| Canada Top Singles (RPM) | 43 |
| US Album Rock Tracks (Billboard) | 10 |
