= Belmont, Indiana =

- Unincorporated community
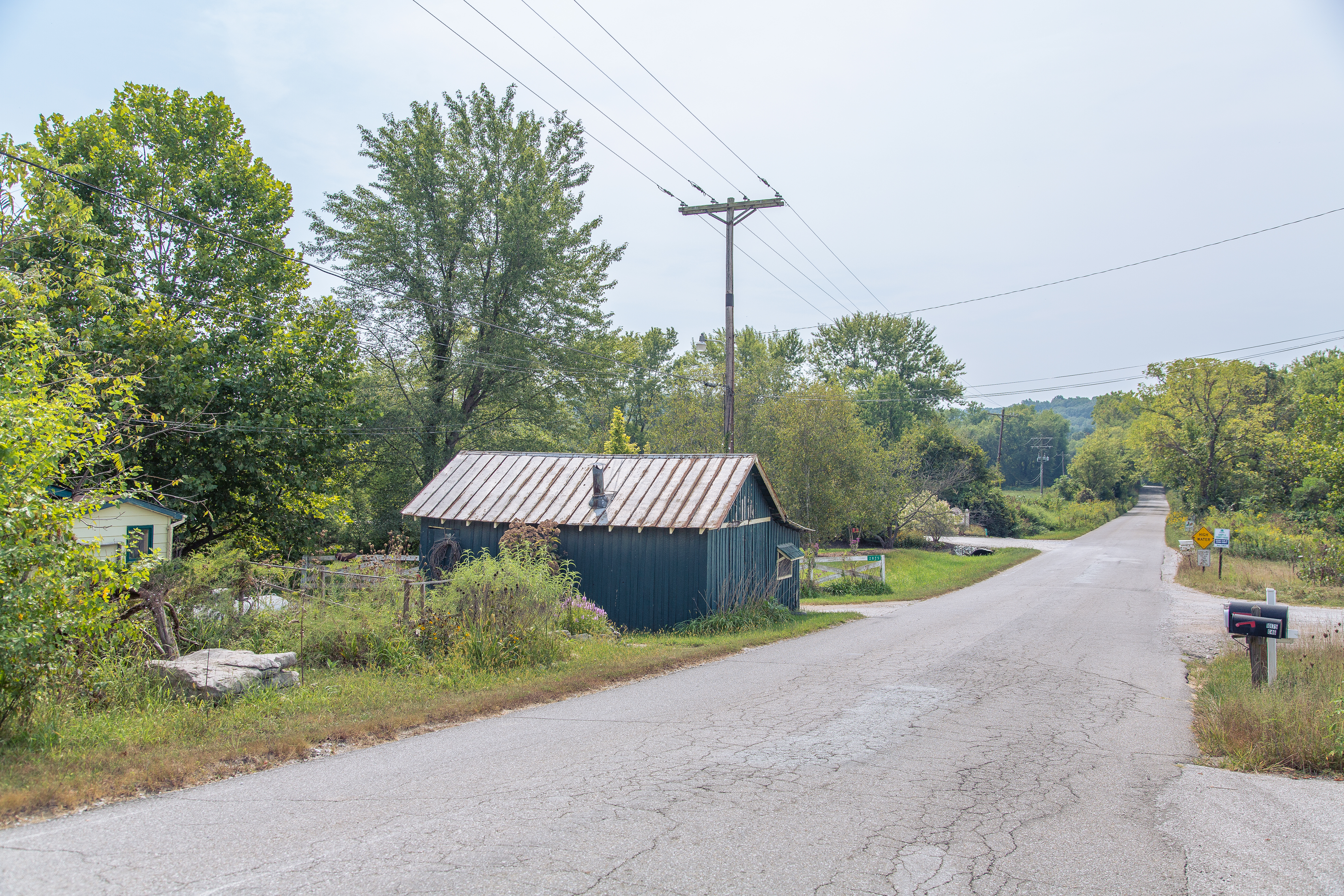

- Brown County's location in Indiana

- Location in Brown County
- Coordinates: 39°09′07″N 86°20′50″W
- Country: United States
- State: Indiana
- County: Brown
- Township: Washington
- Elevation: 574 ft (175 m)
- Time zone: UTC-5 (Eastern (EST))
  - Summer (DST): UTC-4 (EDT)
- ZIP code: 47448
- Area codes: 812 & 930
- FIPS code: 18-04564
- GNIS feature ID: 430784

Belmont is an unincorporated community in Washington Township, Brown County, in the U.S. state of Indiana.

== History ==
A post office was established at Belmont in 1884, and remained in operation until it was discontinued in 1916.

In 1907 Hoosier Group artist T. C. Steele and his wife, Selma Neubacher Steele, moved into newly built studio and home on 60 acres (24 hectares) of hilltop land one and a half miles south of Belmont. They named their summer retreat the House of the Singing Winds; it became their year-round residence in 1912. After purchasing additional acreage in 1911 to increase their Brown County property to 211 acres (85 hectares) of land, they made further improvements that included an enlarged home surrounded by expansive gardens, a large studio-gallery, and several other outbuildings. In July 1945 Selma donated the entire property and more than 300 of her husband's paintings to the Indiana Department of Conservation (the present-day Indiana Department of Natural Resources) to preserve it as the T. C. Steele State Historic Site. It was listed on the National Register of Historic Places in 1973. The T. C. Steele Memorial Cemetery, which is also in the state historic site near Belmont, includes the graves of T. C. and Selma Steele.

== Geography ==
Belmont is located on State Road 46, halfway between Nashville and Bloomington in west-central Brown County.
