= Toby Myers =

American musician (1949–2025)

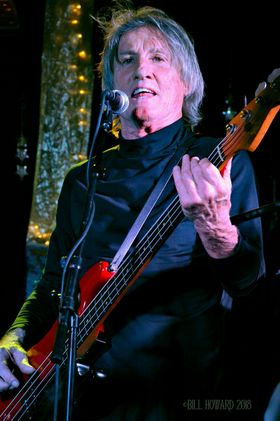
- Myers performing with Roadmaster in 2018

Background information
- Birth name: Jeffrey Glenn Myers
- Born: September 26, 1949; Indianapolis, Indiana, U.S.
- Died: January 16, 2025 (aged 75); Nashville, Indiana, U.S.
- Genres: Rock; heartland rock; hard rock; roots rock; folk rock; country rock; arena rock; album-oriented rock; pop rock
- Occupations: Musician; songwriter; actor
- Instruments: Bass guitar; vocals
- Years active: 1971–2018

Jeffrey Glenn Myers (September 26, 1949 – January 16, 2025), known professionally as Toby Myers, was an American musician known as the bassist for Roadmaster and John Cougar Mellencamp.

== Life and career ==
Myers was born and raised in the Indianapolis, Indiana, area where he attended art school at the John Herron School of Art from 1968 to 1971. He developed an interest in music and began playing bass in a music shop next to the laundromat where his mother did the family's laundry. Myers began playing in bands in high school.

Myers lived next door to keyboard player Michael Read, one of the founding members of Pure Funk, a popular Indianapolis college funk band. Myers joined Pure Funk as their bass player in 1971. In 1974, Pure Funk had changed its name to Roadmaster. Roadmaster was a fairly successful pomp rock band which was discovered by Todd Rundgren and ultimately recorded four albums for Village/Mercury Records.

When Roadmaster's fourth album (Fortress) failed to hit the charts in the early 80's Mercury Records dropped the band. Nine months later Myers was recruited by members of John Mellencamp's band in Bloomington, Indiana to play bass for "John Cougar," as Mellencamp was then known. After only a few weeks of rehearsal with the band, Myers' first gig with Mellencamp was their appearance on Saturday Night Live on April 10, 1982. In 1983, Myers – along with Larry Crane and Mike Wanchic on guitars, Kenny Aronoff on drums and percussion, and John Cascella on keyboards – recorded Mellencamp's 1983 album Uh-Huh. This was the backing band Mellencamp settled on and would retain for the next several albums. In 1988, Rolling Stone magazine called this version of Mellencamp's band "one of the most powerful and versatile live bands ever assembled."

Myers toured and recorded with John Mellencamp from 1982 to 1999. His final show with John was the sold out New Year's Eve show in Indianapolis. In 1992, Myers appeared as "Luke" in the John Mellencamp-directed movie, Falling from Grace.

Myers celebrated his 60th birthday in 2009 with a large party in Nashville, Indiana, where he resided until his death on January 16, 2025, following a battle with cancer. He was 75.
