= Objects in the Mirror Are Closer Than They Appear =

Objects in the Mirror Are Closer Than They Appear may refer to:

- Objects in the Mirror Are Closer Than They Appear (Confrontation Camp album), 2000
- Objects in the Mirror Are Closer Than They Appear (Nancy Moran album), 1993

== See also ==
- Objects in mirror are closer than they appear, a safety warning
- "Objects in the Rear View Mirror May Appear Closer than They Are", a song by Meat Loaf
- "Objects in the Mirror" (song), a 2002 song by Prince from the album One Nite Alone...
