= Murder of James Byrd Jr. =

1998 lynching and hate crime in Jasper, Texas, US

James Byrd Jr.
- Born: May 2, 1949; Beaumont, Texas, U.S.
- Died: June 7, 1998 (aged 49); Jasper, Texas, U.S.
- Cause of death: Murder by dragging
- Resting place: Jasper City Cemetery
- Occupation: Vacuum salesman
- Children: 3

James Byrd Jr. (May 2, 1949 – June 7, 1998) was an African-American man who was murdered by three men, two of whom were avowed white supremacists, in Jasper, Texas, on June 7, 1998. Shawn Berry, Lawrence Brewer, and John King dragged him for 3 miles (5 kilometers) behind a Ford pickup truck along a dirt road. Byrd, who remained conscious for much of his ordeal, was killed about halfway through the dragging when his body hit the edge of a culvert, severing his right arm and head. The murderers drove on for another 1 1/2 miles (2.5 kilometers) before dumping his torso in front of a Black cemetery.

Brewer and King are among the few white men to be executed for killing a Black person in Texas since the death penalty was reinstated in the 1970s. In 2001, Byrd's lynching-by-dragging led the state of Texas to pass a hate crimes law, which later led the United States Congress to pass the Matthew Shepard and James Byrd Jr. Hate Crimes Prevention Act in 2009. Brewer was executed by lethal injection for his part in the murder on September 21, 2011. King was executed by lethal injection at the state penitentiary in Huntsville, Texas, on April 24, 2019. Berry was sentenced to life imprisonment and will be eligible for parole in 2038.

== Victim background ==
James Byrd Jr. was born on May 2, 1949, in Beaumont, Texas, the third of nine children, to Stella Mae Sharp and James Byrd Sr. His mother was a Sunday School teacher and his father was a deacon at the Greater New Bethel Church. Byrd graduated from Jasper Rowe High School in 1967, the last segregated class. After graduating from high school, he married and had three children: Renee, Ross, and Jamie. Between 1969 and 1996, Byrd was incarcerated several times for various offenses, including theft, forgery, and violation of parole. After his divorce and a fall which left him disabled, he lived alone in Jasper. Byrd worked as a vacuum salesman, and according to friends and family, was a talented singer and trumpet and piano player who often performed at birthday parties and other events. He was a cousin of Dennetta Lyles King, who was Rodney King's first wife and mother to his daughter Lora King.

Ross Byrd, James Byrd's only son, has been involved with "Murder Victims' Families for Reconciliation", an organization that opposes capital punishment. He campaigned to spare the lives of those who murdered his father and appeared briefly in the documentary Deadline.

== Murder ==
On June 7, 1998, Byrd, age 49, accepted a ride from Shawn Berry (age 23), Lawrence Brewer (age 31), and John King (age 23). Berry, who was driving, was acquainted with Byrd from around town. Instead of taking Byrd home, the three men took Byrd to a remote county road out of town, beat him severely, and chained him by his ankles to their pickup truck before dragging him for about three miles (five kilometers) on Huff Creek Road (County Road 278). Brewer later claimed that Byrd's throat had been slashed by Berry before he was dragged. However, forensic evidence suggests that Byrd had been attempting to keep his head up while being dragged, and an autopsy suggested that Byrd was alive during much of the dragging. Byrd died about halfway along the route of his dragging, when his right arm and head were severed as his body hit a culvert. While almost all of Byrd's ribs were fractured, his brain and skull were found intact, further suggesting that he maintained consciousness while he was being dragged.

Berry, Brewer, and King dumped the mutilated remains of Byrd's body in front of an African-American cemetery on Huff Creek Road, then drove off to a barbecue. A motorist found Byrd's decapitated remains the following morning. Along the area where Byrd was dragged, police found a wrench with "Berry" written on it. They also found a lighter that was inscribed with "Possum", which was King's prison nickname. The police found 81 places that included portions of Byrd's remains. Since Brewer and King were well-known white supremacists, it was determined by state law enforcement officials that the murder was a hate crime. They called upon the Federal Bureau of Investigation less than 24 hours after the discovery of Byrd's remains. The special agent in charge of the FBI's Houston office said that they were assisting because of the case's "extreme circumstances".

Berry, Brewer, and King were tried and convicted for Byrd's murder. Brewer and King received the death penalty, while Berry was sentenced to life in prison. Brewer was executed by lethal injection on September 21, 2011, and King was executed on April 24, 2019.

== Perpetrators ==
=== Shawn Berry ===
During the trial of Shawn Allen Berry, the prosecution conceded that he was not a white supremacist, but argued that he was just as responsible for Byrd's murder as the other men and suggested that he still might have been influenced by racism or perhaps been a thrill killer.

"Maybe some of what they were saying rubbed off on him. Maybe he was a thrill seeker... Maybe he wanted to play with a rattlesnake and see what happened."

Berry's attorneys had three Black men who knew him testify that he was not a racist. Berry claimed that Brewer and King were almost entirely responsible for the crime. He said he tried to stop them from attacking Byrd until Brewer threatened to do the same to him. Brewer, however, testified that Berry had cut Byrd's throat before he was tied to the truck. The jury decided that minimal evidence supported this claim. Berry had also cooperated with the police and was the only perpetrator to show any remorse. As a result, Berry was sentenced to life in prison rather than death. As of 2020, Berry is living in protective custody at the Texas Department of Criminal Justice's Ramsey Unit, and he will be eligible for parole in June 2038, by which time he will be 63 years old. He spends 23 hours per day in a cell measuring 8 by 6 feet (2.4 by 1.8 meters), with one hour for exercise. Berry married Christie Marcontell by proxy.

=== Lawrence Brewer ===
Lawrence Russell Brewer (March 13, 1967 – September 21, 2011) was a white supremacist who, prior to Byrd's murder, had served prison time for drug possession and burglary. He was paroled in 1991, but was reincarcerated three years later for breaching his parole conditions. During this incarceration, Brewer befriended King in the Beto Unit and, according to his own court testimony, joined a white supremacist prison gang to protect himself from other inmates. A psychiatrist testified that Brewer did not appear repentant for his crimes. During the trial, the prosecution labeled him a "racist psychopath". Brewer was ultimately convicted and sentenced to death. He spent 12 years on death row at the Polunsky Unit before being executed by lethal injection in the Huntsville Unit on September 21, 2011. On the day before his execution, Brewer told KHOU 11 News: "As far as any regrets, no, I have no regrets. No, I'd do it all over again, to tell you the truth."

Notably, Brewer requested a lavish last meal – two chicken-fried steaks, a triple-patty bacon cheeseburger, a cheese omelette, a bowl of fried okra, a pound of barbecued meat, three fajitas, a meat-lover's pizza, a pint of ice cream, a slab of peanut-butter fudge, and three root beers – but declined to eat any of it, citing a lack of appetite. In response to this, State Senator John Whitmire asked Texas prison officials to abolish the state's long-standing practice of granting personalized last meals to condemned inmates. Brad Livingston, the executive director of the prison agency, concurred with this request, stating that inmates facing execution would henceforth receive the same meal as other prisoners in their unit.

=== John King ===
John William "Bill" King (November 3, 1974 – April 24, 2019) was Berry's longtime friend. He was accused of beating Byrd with a bat and then dragging him behind a pickup truck until he died. Recently released from a Texas prison prior to the murder, King alleged that he was gang raped by Black inmates multiple times while incarcerated. He was found guilty and sentenced to death for his role in Byrd's kidnapping and murder, and was on death row at the Polunsky Unit.

King had several racist tattoos, including a Black man hanging from a tree, Nazi symbols, the words "Aryan Pride", and the insignia of a white supremacist prison gang known as the Confederate Knights of America. In a jailhouse letter to Brewer that was intercepted by jail officials, King boasted of the crime's impact and his willingness to die for it, writing, "Regardless of the outcome of this, we have made history. Death before dishonor. Sieg Heil!" An officer investigating the case also testified that King referenced The Turner Diaries, a notorious white supremacist novel, after beating Byrd.

King was executed by lethal injection at the Huntsville Unit on April 24, 2019. His appeals to both the Texas Court of Criminal Appeals and the Texas Board of Pardons and Paroles were denied two days before.

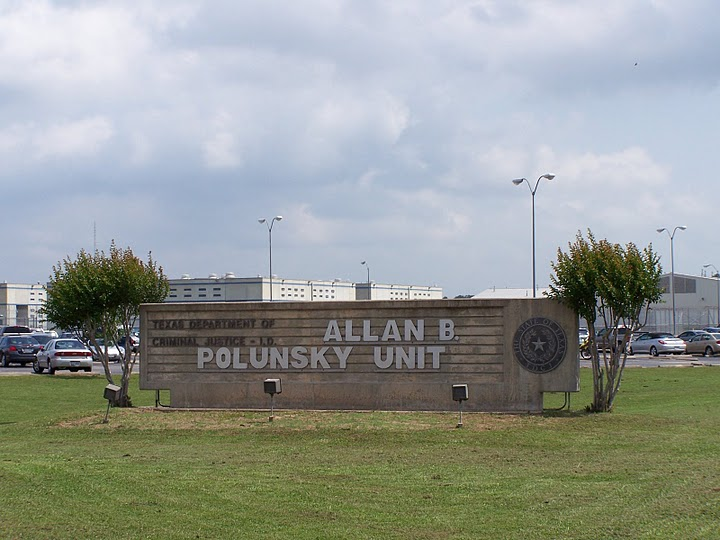
The condemned perpetrators were held at the Allan B. Polunsky Unit.

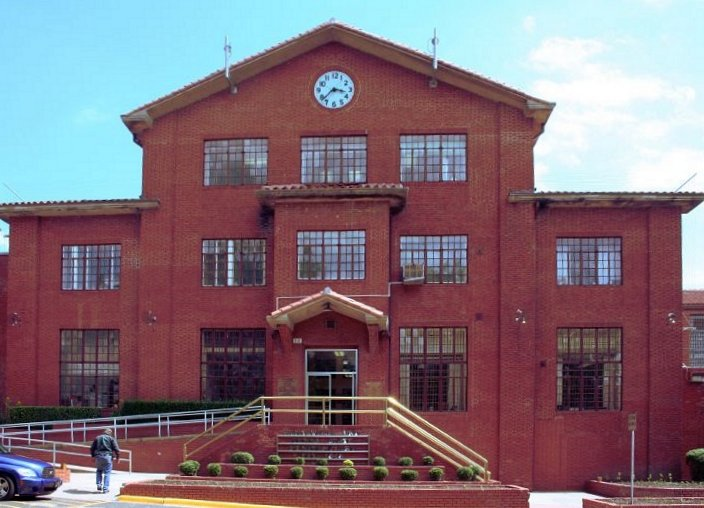
Huntsville Unit, where Brewer and King were executed

== Reactions ==
Numerous aspects of the Byrd murder echo lynching traditions that were common in the post-Civil War south. These include mutilation or decapitation and revelry, such as a barbecue or a picnic, either during or after a lynching. Byrd's murder was strongly condemned by Jesse Jackson and the Martin Luther King Center as an act of vicious racism. It also focused national attention on the prevalence of white supremacist prison gangs.

Three of Byrd's sisters are Jehovah's Witnesses, and in a joint statement said: "Having a loved one tortured and lynched produced an unimaginable sense of loss and pain. How does one respond to such a brutal act? Retaliation, hateful speech, or promotion of hate-ridden propaganda never entered our mind. We thought: 'What would Jesus have done? How would he have responded?' The answer was crystal clear. His message would have been one of peace and hope."

The victim's family created the James Byrd Foundation for Racial Healing after his death. Basketball star Dennis Rodman paid their funeral expenses and gave Byrd's family $25,000. Fight promoter Don King gave Byrd's children $100,000 to be put towards their educational expenses. On the 25th anniversary of Byrd's death, family members reflected in a 2023 interview for the Texas Tribune that fundraising for the foundation had become much harder as knowledge of Byrd's murder fades; one sister reflected that there was less awareness among the public of hatred in the community: "People don't want to fund it because they think there's no hate in the world", she was quoted as saying. A reporter visiting Jasper in 2018 noted that several residents denied Byrd's death had any relation to racism or hate crimes. Writing for the Pacific Standard magazine, John Savage said:

... a dozen white residents have told me that racial hatred wasn't the principal motivation of Byrd's killers. Most of them say the murder was simply the result of a drug deal gone wrong. King's lawyer made the same argument to the Fifth U.S. Circuit Court of Appeals ...

On October 7, 1998, an episode of Law & Order titled "DWB" (driving while Black) referenced the murder within the plot. Instead of three white supremacists, however, the killers were three white New York City police officers. As the plot goes, the officers stop and arrest a Black man for no reason, and then proceed to drag him to his death, after tying him to the car.

In 1999, the documentary Journey to a Hate Free Millennium was released, showcasing three United States hate crimes: the shootings at Columbine High School; the death of a gay student, Matthew Shepard; and the murder of Byrd. The same year, the city of Jasper named a local park the "James Byrd Jr. Memorial Park" in his honor.

In 2003, a movie about the crime, titled Jasper, Texas, was produced and aired on Showtime. The same year, a documentary titled Two Towns of Jasper, made by filmmakers Marco Williams and Whitney Dow, premiered on PBS's P.O.V. series.

While employed as a radio DJ at station WARW in Washington, DC, Doug Tracht (also known as the "Greaseman") made a derogatory comment referring to Byrd after playing Lauryn Hill's song "Doo Wop (That Thing)". The February 1999 incident proved catastrophic to Tracht's radio career, igniting protests from Black and white listeners alike. He was quickly fired from WARW and lost his position as a volunteer deputy sheriff in Falls Church, Virginia.

In May 2004, two white teens, Joshua Lee Talley and John Matthew Fowler, were arrested and charged with criminal mischief for desecrating Byrd's grave with racial slurs and profanities. According to a 2023 report in the Texas Tribune, Byrd's grave has been desecrated on at least one other occasion; as a result of the desecrations, his family had a gated iron-railing enclosure placed around it.

=== Effect on US politics ===
Some advocacy groups, such as the NAACP National Voter Fund, made an issue of this case during George W. Bush's presidential campaign in 2000. They accused Bush of implicit racism, since as governor of Texas, he opposed hate-crime legislation. Bush, who also opposed federal hate crime laws after becoming president, insisted that "all crimes are hate crimes." Also, citing a prior commitment, Bush did not appear at Byrd's funeral. Because two of the three murderers were sentenced to death and the third murderer was sentenced to life in prison (all three of them were charged with and convicted of capital murder, the highest felony level in Texas), Governor Bush maintained, "we don't need tougher laws". The 77th Texas Legislature passed the James Byrd Jr. Hate Crimes Act. With the signature of Governor Rick Perry, who inherited the balance of Bush's unexpired term, the act became Texas state law in 2001. In 2009, the Matthew Shepard and James Byrd Jr. Hate Crimes Prevention Act expanded the 1969 United States federal hate-crime law to include crimes which are motivated by a victim's actual or perceived gender, sexual orientation, gender identity, or disability.

=== Musical and poetry tributes ===
On the 2001 album Pieces of Me by singer-songwriter Lori McKenna, the song "Pink Sweater" is dedicated to Byrd; it condemns his murderers and references their death-penalty convictions with the raucous refrain, "I'll be the one in the pink sweater, dancing around when you're gone." In 2010, Alabama musician Matthew Mayfield wrote, recorded, and released a song in Byrd's honor. The tune, titled "Still Alive", is the fourth track on Mayfield's EP You're Not Home. "Still Alive" clearly related a stark bitterness towards racism and equated such hate crimes with genocide. "Tell Me Why", featuring Mary J. Blige, mentions Byrd on Will Smith's fourth album, Lost and Found. Byrd's son Ross recorded the rap album Undeniable Resurrection and dedicated it to his father.

"Jasper", by Confrontation Camp, is the fifth track on the album Objects in the Mirror Are Closer Than They Appear (2000). "Guitar Drag" by sound artist Christian Marclay is a video- and sound-installation about the murder of James Byrd, in which a guitar was hooked to the back of a truck and dragged down a road, producing feedback and noise. "I Heard 'Em Say" by Ryan Bingham is about Byrd's murder and the racially charged climate around Jasper following the crime (2012).

Byrd's murder is the subject of Lucille Clifton's poem "jasper texas 1998".

The Geto Boys track "Eye 4 An Eye" from Da Good da Bad & da Ugly refers to Byrd's manner of death in its second verse.

The story of Byrd's murder, and that of Matthew Shepard, are told in a verse of the song "Trouble the Waters" by Big Country on their album Driving to Damascus (named John Wayne's Dream in its US release).

Byrd's murder is depicted in Nia DaCosta's 2021 film Candyman, featuring him resurrected as one of the souls trapped in the Candyman "hive": in his Candyman form, with his skull exposed, Byrd uses the hook and cables involved in his murder to kill his murderers, ascending into legend. Depicted in the film's mid-credits scene in the form of shadow puppetry, Byrd's murder was previously featured in DaCosta's 2020 promotional short film of the same name. Before that, the murder had been depicted in the film Citizen Toxie: The Toxic Avenger IV which was filmed a year after the murder.

Andrea Gibson makes multiple references to James Byrd Jr.'s murder in their poem Letter to White Queers. The absence of a major reaction to Byrd's murder, along with other instances of anti-Black racism, among queer, white Americans is contrasted with the response to Shephard's killing.

== See also ==
- Hate crime laws in the United States
- List of lynching victims in the United States
- List of people executed in Texas, 2010–2019
- List of people executed in the United States in 2011
- List of people executed in the United States in 2019
- List of white defendants executed for killing a black victim
- Race and capital punishment in the United States
- Racism against African Americans
