= 2001 United States Grand Prix =

Coordinates: 39°47′42″N 86°14′05″W

Race 16 of 17 in the 2001 Formula One World Championship
← Previous race	Next race →

Race details
- Date: September 30, 2001
- Official name: 2001 SAP United States Grand Prix
- Location: Indianapolis Motor Speedway; Speedway, Indiana
- Course: Permanent racing facility
- Course length: 4.192 km (2.605 miles)
- Distance: 73 laps, 306.016 km (190.150 miles)
- Weather: Sunny, cool, Air: 19–22 °C (66–72 °F); Track 27–28 °C (81–82 °F)
- Attendance: 175,000–200,000

Pole position
Driver	(Germany) Michael Schumacher	Ferrari
- Time: 1:11.708

Fastest lap
Driver	(Colombia) Juan Pablo Montoya	Williams-BMW
- Time: 1:14.448 on lap 35

Podium
First	(Finland) Mika Häkkinen	McLaren-Mercedes
Second	(Germany) Michael Schumacher	Ferrari
Third	(United Kingdom) David Coulthard	McLaren-Mercedes

The 2001 United States Grand Prix (formally the 2001 SAP United States Grand Prix) was a Formula One motor race held on September 30, 2001, at the Indianapolis Motor Speedway in Speedway, Indiana. It was the 16th and penultimate round of the 2001 Formula One World Championship, and the second United States Grand Prix hosted at Indianapolis. It was the first international sporting event to take place in the United States since the September 11 attacks, which occurred 19 days before the Grand Prix. McLaren's Mika Häkkinen won the 73-lap race after starting fourth. Ferrari's Michael Schumacher finished second, while Häkkinen's teammate David Coulthard was third.

Michael Schumacher took pole position after setting the fastest qualifying lap, with Häkkinen second. Häkkinen's best time, however, was deleted by the stewards after he was penalized for a pit lane infraction during the warm-up session and dropped to fourth on the basis of his second-best qualifying lap. Michael Schumacher led the opening four laps before relinquishing the lead to teammate Rubens Barrichello. Before his first of two pit stops on lap 27, Barrichello had built up a significant lead over his teammate. Häkkinen used his engine's low fuel usage to take the lead and keep it until his lone pit stop on the 46th lap, when he dropped to second. Barrichello retook the lead for four laps, and Häkkinen led the rest of the race to claim his second victory of the season and the 20th (and final) of his career after Barrichello was forced to retire two laps from the finish due to an engine failure.

The final result meant that Michael Schumacher broke the all-time record for most points scored in a season, which he shared with Nigel Mansell. Coulthard increased his lead over Barrichello in the World Drivers' Championship by four championship points in the battle for second. McLaren's performance in Indianapolis clinched the team second in the World Constructors' Championship from Williams with one round remaining in the season.

== Background ==
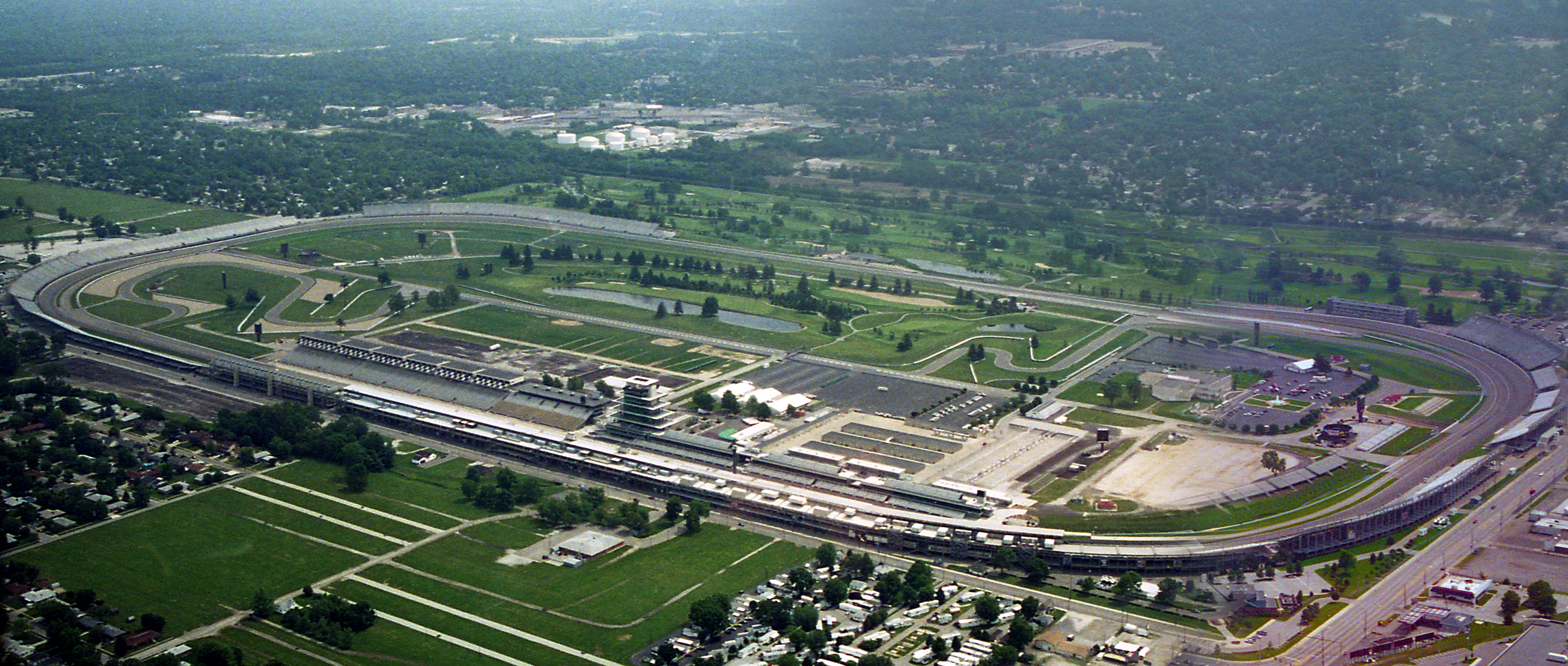
The Indianapolis Motor Speedway, where the race was held

The 2001 United States Grand Prix was the penultimate round of the 2001 Formula One World Championship, held on September 30, 2001, at the 4.192 km (2.605 mi) Indianapolis Motor Speedway (IMS) road course in Speedway, Indiana. It was the second United States Grand Prix to take place at Indianapolis, which had previously hosted the Indianapolis 500 as part of the Formula One World Championship from 1950 to 1960. The Porsche Supercup and the Ferrari Challenge held support races during the weekend. Bridgestone brought the soft and hard compound tires to the Grand Prix while Michelin supplied the "Prime" and "Option" compounds.

Before the race, both the World Drivers' Championship and World Constructors' Championship were already won, with Ferrari driver Michael Schumacher having secured the World Drivers' Championship three rounds earlier in the Hungarian Grand Prix and Ferrari took the World Constructors' Championship at the same race, with McLaren too many championship points behind to be able to catch them.

Following the Italian Grand Prix on 16 September, the Arrows, Benetton, British American Racing (BAR), Jordan, Jaguar and McLaren teams tested over three days at the Silverstone Circuit in England to prepare for the United States Grand Prix. Wet weather affected all three days, and teams only got the final day to run on a dry track. Jordan's Jean Alesi led the first day of testing, while McLaren test driver Alexander Wurz led the remaining two days. The Williams team tested its Michelin tyres, chassis, and engine at the Circuito do Estoril with regular driver Ralf Schumacher, test driver Marc Gené, and Formula 3000 drivers Antônio Pizzonia and Ricardo Sperafico. Sauber developed the C20 car for the American race for four days at the Mugello Circuit in Italy, first with Italian Formula 3000 driver Felipe Massa and then with regular driver Nick Heidfeld. Ferrari test driver Luca Badoer spent five days at the Fiorano Circuit in Italy evaluating the F2001's electronics systems, engine mapping, tire evaluations, and components for the F2002 car.

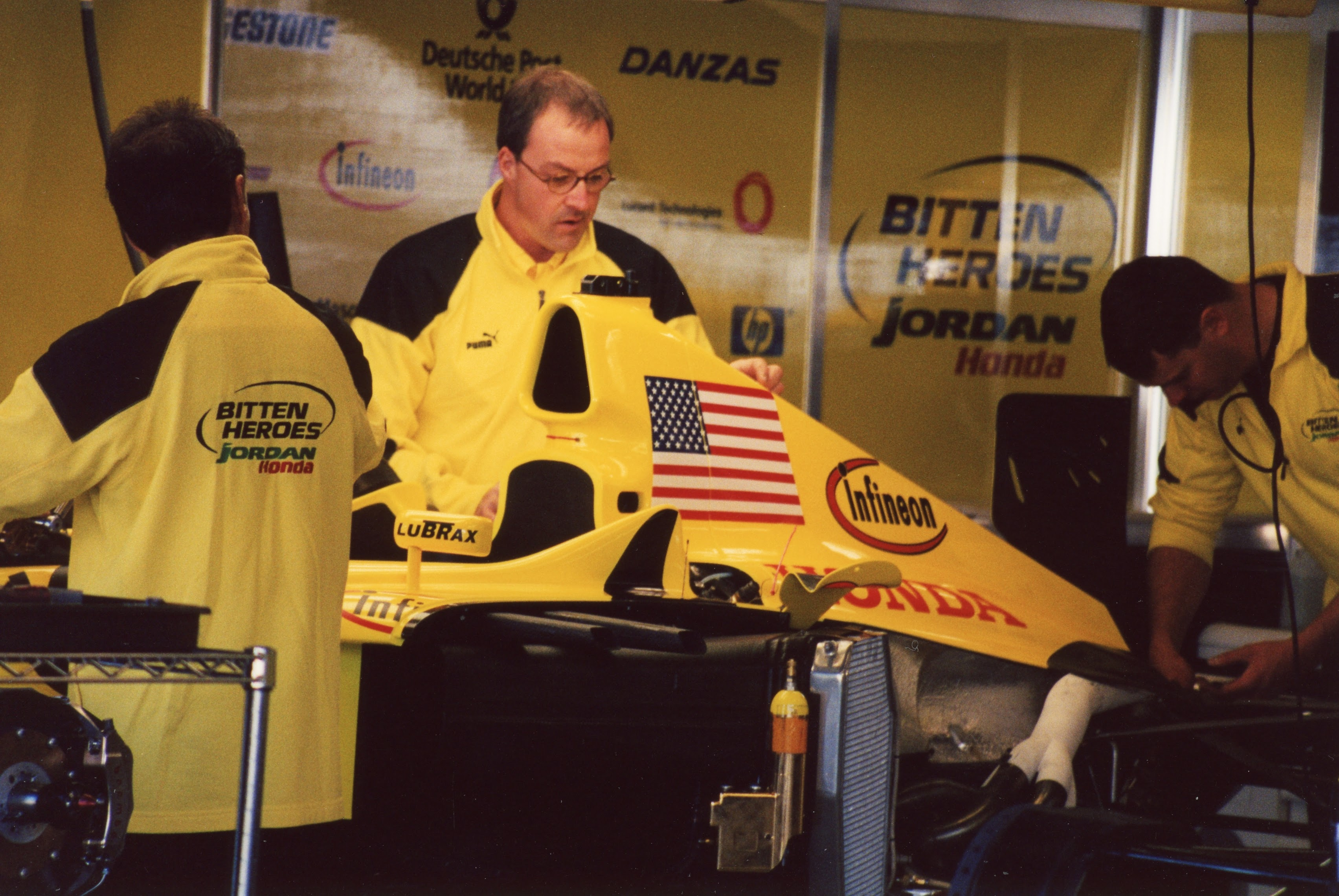
A tribute to the victims of the September 11 attacks on the engine cover of the Jordan EJ11 car

The September 11 attacks occurred 19 days before the race, forcing several teams to be hesitant to send workers to Indianapolis amid security concerns at the circuit. Some drivers and team principals publicly questioned the race's viability due to concerns about behavior and personal safety but others believed it had to be held to show support for the United States. The race went on as planned, with additional security measures implemented by local, state, and federal law enforcement to protect spectators and participating teams. It was the United States's first major international sporting event since the attacks, and no security incidents occurred. According to IMS president Tony George, he never considered cancelling the race after talking to Fédération Internationale de l'Automobile (FIA; Formula One's governing body) president Max Mosley and Formula One commercial rights holder Bernie Ecclestone. Several participants paid respect to the victims of the September 11 attacks by putting American flags on their racing helmets and cars. The Grand Prix Drivers' Association donated personal racing items to raise funds for the victims.

Eleven constructors entered two drivers each for the event; six of the entered drivers had not driven on the Indianapolis road course before and two were past Indianapolis 500 winners. Michael Schumacher and Williams driver Juan Pablo Montoya were the British bookmakers' joint favourites to win the race. FIA doctor Gary Hartstein ordered Luciano Burti to rest until at least the end of December 2001, and he was replaced for the season's final two races by Czech driver Tomáš Enge. Minardi ran into problems with preparation because half of their personnel did not have visas. The issue was later resolved and the team travelled to Indianapolis. Because of the terrorist attacks, Michael Schumacher was given the option to withdraw from the Grand Prix by Ferrari, who had Badoer on standby to replace him if necessary. He ultimately went to the race. Ralf Schumacher, his brother, also competed despite calling Formula One's plans to hold the race a "bad joke."

Some teams modified their cars for the race, with most concentrating on adapting them to the Indianapolis road course. Ferrari and Williams brought technical innovations that they intended to use in the 2002 season. Ferrari introduced a revised steering wheel with four additional buttons, two of which were for adjusting the traction control system. The team also installed a new extractor profile and a rear wing similar to the one used at the Canadian Grand Prix. Williams fitted new engine exhausts, similar to those built by Ferrari. It also made two chassis available to their drivers but without new bodywork because some bulky radiators were difficult to mount. Jordan installed new Ferrari-style brake ducts on their EJ11 car for qualifying and Minardi supplied titanium gearboxes to their drivers.

== Practice ==
There were two one-hour sessions on Friday and two 45-minute sessions on Saturday morning before the race on Sunday. Friday's two practice sessions were held in cool, overcast weather, with fewer spectators in the grandstands because of the September 11 attacks. The circuit was relatively dirty, so most of the first practice session was spent cleaning it and laying tire rubber on it. The lack of grip on the dusty surface meant several drivers lost control of their cars but no one crashed. Michael Schumacher set the fastest lap of 1:14.085 late in the session. He was followed by McLaren's David Coulthard, Rubens Barrichello (Ferrari), Benetton's Giancarlo Fisichella, Sauber's Kimi Räikkönen and his teammate Heidfeld, as well as Jordan's Jarno Trulli, Benetton's Jenson Button and Arrows's Jos Verstappen. Mika Häkkinen's McLaren was on the jacks due to a pneumatic valve gear failure, requiring the mechanics to change the engine in 45 minutes to resolve the issue; this restricted him to four laps and was 14th-fastest.

Drivers continued to tweak their setups around the circuit during the second practice session. Häkkinen set the day's fastest time, a 1:13:387, with twelve minutes remaining. Michael Schumacher, Barrichello, Coulthard, Jaguar's Eddie Irvine, Heidfeld, Prost's Heinz-Harald Frentzen, Irvine's teammate Pedro de la Rosa and the Williams duo of Ralf Schumacher and Montoya were in positions two through ten. Fisichella's session was cut short after five minutes after his Benetton car went into the gravel at turn four. Enge spun through 180 degrees at the exit of turn eight due to oversteer. Just as Enge was able to turn his car in the right way, two Jaguars narrowly missed hitting the rear of his car, causing him to stall and necessitating the assistance of marshals. An electrical fault caused Verstappen to stop his car at the pit lane entry with two minutes left.

During Saturday's practice sessions, which were held in dry and sunny conditions, Ferrari were the only team to test rear brake lights, although no concrete conclusions were drawn from their use. Michael Schumacher set the quickest lap at 1:12.078 a third of the way through the third practice session. His brother Ralf Schumacher, Barrichello, Häkkinen, Coulthard, Button, Heidfeld, Fisichella and Trulli followed in positions two to ten. Montoya lost control of his car's rear while braking due to oversteer and spun through 180 degrees at turn six, although he continued driving without damage. Trulli spun between turns nine and ten before Bernoldi spun backwards onto the turn eight escape road and stalled the engine.

Due to an oil pump failure caused by a loss in oil pressure, Michael Schumacher abandoned his Ferrari on the grass beside the pit lane exit in the final practice session. This necessitated an engine change for qualifying but he remained fastest overall. Häkkinen was faster and moved to second place. Heidfeld, Ralf Schumacher, Barrichello, Montoya, Fisichella, Coulthard, Button, and Räikkönen completed the top ten. Häkkinen skidded into the gravel trap between turns three and four before rejoining the track, and Alex Yoong spun twice in his Minardi midway through the race but continued without stalling.

== Qualifying ==
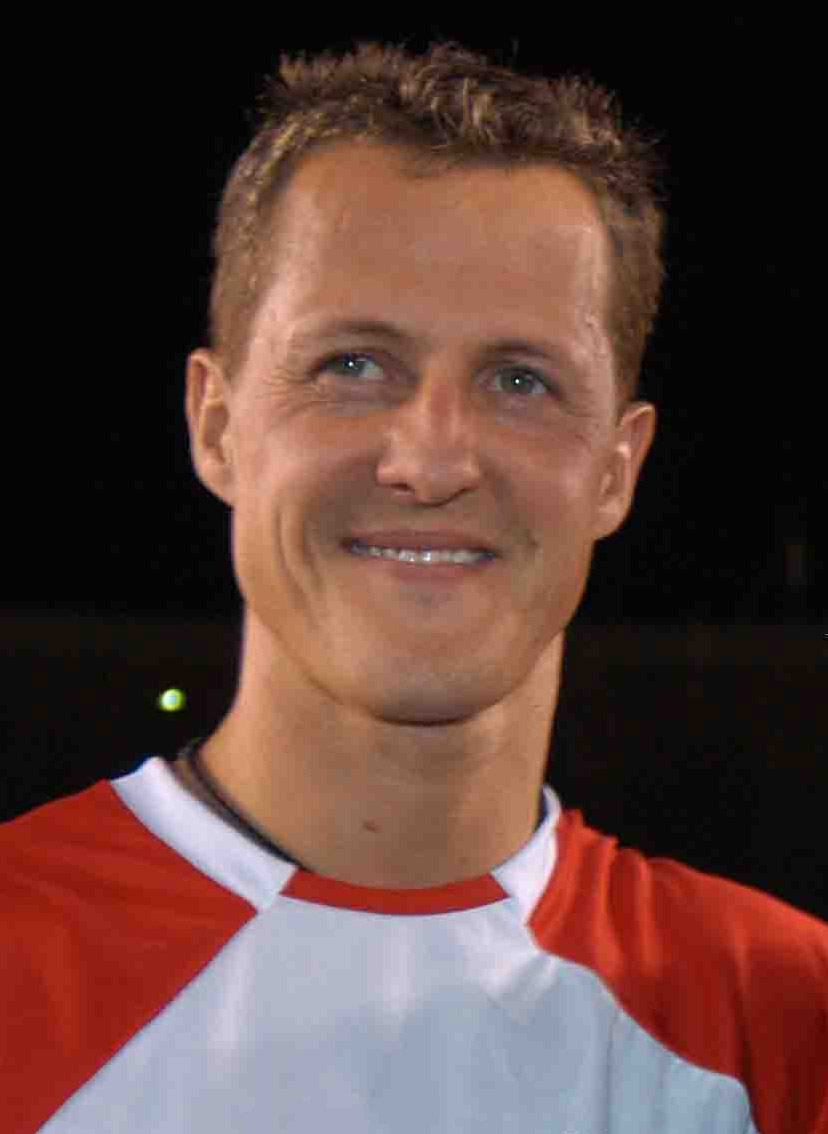
Michael Schumacher (pictured in 2005) qualified on pole position for the tenth time in the 2001 season.

During Saturday's one-hour qualifying session, each driver was limited to twelve laps, with the starting positions determined by the drivers' fastest laps. The 107% rule was in force during this session, forcing each driver to stay within 107% of the quickest lap time in order to qualify for the race. The session was held in clear weather. Michael Schumacher was unaffected by slower cars, securing his tenth pole position of the season in 16 races and 42nd of his career with a time of 1:11.708 set on his third quick lap with nine minutes remaining. He made no further runs, telling Ferrari that he had exhausted his car's capability. He was provisionally joined on the grid's front row by Häkkinen, who challenged Schumacher for pole until the latter set the pole-deciding lap. Häkkinen made no attempt to lap quicker after setting his fastest time since he knew he could not go faster. Ralf Schumacher took third after a braking error into turn four stopped him from lapping faster. His teammate Montoya, fourth, had handling issues, slower cars on his third run, and made a driver error on his final run. Barrichello was fifth after failing to slipstream teammate Michael Schumacher on his second run when he encountered Trulli. Heidfeld equalled his best qualifying result of the season, taking sixth. He felt he could have gone faster if he had not had to lose two-tenths of a second by braking early on his fastest lap due to an accident involving Enge. Coulthard in seventh had a car setup that failed to eliminate oversteer on a light fuel load. Jordan teammates Alesi (in his 200th Grand Prix start) and Trulli were eighth and ninth, respectively, due to poor infield performance due to a lower downforce configuration for higher top speed on the main straight; Trulli aborted his final run due to the presence of slower cars. Button improved his car during qualifying and took tenth, his first top ten start of the season.

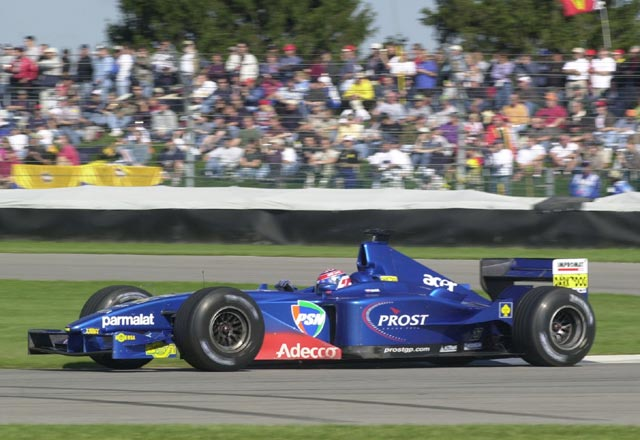
Tomáš Enge damaged his Prost car against the turn eight tire barrier during qualifying

Räikkönen, 11th, was the fastest non-top-ten qualifier, unable to establish the optimal chassis balance after small setup changes proved ineffective and had handling issues. Fisichella finished 12th after encountering yellow flags for Enge's crash, forcing him to slow down during his final run. Part of his engine cover detached on the main straight. BAR's Olivier Panis lacked grip and began from 13th. Irvine, 14th, experienced understeer and significant front-end vibration after a setup adjustment for his fourth run, in which he lost time on the banking. Frentzen in 15th reported that his team adjusted the balance of his car. De la Rosa was 16th after encountering traffic on his final run and failing to generate heat in his tyres. Minardi's Fernando Alonso secured 17th on his final attempt after suspecting an engine problem in his race chassis on his third run and switching to the team's spare car with an older gearbox. Panis's teammate Jacques Villeneuve in 18th drove a car lacking grip after an incorrect chassis setup and tried the spare BAR vehicle. The Arrows duo of Enrique Bernoldi and Verstappen qualified 19th and 20th; Bernoldi's engine developed a chronic misfire and entered the garage to switch to the team's spare car for the rest of the session. Verstappen made a minor error on his first run and was delayed by Montoya at turn three on his last run. Enge, 21st, experienced a right-front brake failure on his final quick lap and collided head-on with the left-hand turn eight tire barrier at the end of the back straight. He was unhurt, and his car was repaired in time for the warm-up session. Yoong completed the starting grid in 22nd after lapping faster on each of his runs despite car balance problems. Tire advancements meant 21 of the 22 qualifiers were faster than the 2000 pole lap.

=== Qualifying classification ===
Pos	No.	Driver	Constructor	Lap	Gap	Grid
1	1	(Germany) Michael Schumacher	Ferrari	1:11.708	—	1
2	5	(Germany) Ralf Schumacher	Williams-BMW	1:11.986	+0.278	2
3	6	(Colombia) Juan Pablo Montoya	Williams-BMW	1:12.252	+0.544	3
4	3	(Finland) Mika Häkkinen^{1}	McLaren-Mercedes	1:12.309	+0.601	4
5	2	(Brazil) Rubens Barrichello	Ferrari	1:12.327	+0.619	5
6	16	(Germany) Nick Heidfeld	Sauber-Petronas	1:12.434	+0.726	6
7	4	(United Kingdom) David Coulthard	McLaren-Mercedes	1:12.500	+0.792	7
8	11	(Italy) Jarno Trulli	Jordan-Honda	1:12.605	+0.897	8
9	12	(France) Jean Alesi	Jordan-Honda	1:12.607	+0.899	9
10	8	(United Kingdom) Jenson Button	Benetton-Renault	1:12.805	+1.097	10
11	17	(Finland) Kimi Räikkönen	Sauber-Petronas	1:12.881	+1.173	11
12	7	(Italy) Giancarlo Fisichella	Benetton-Renault	1:12.942	+1.234	12
13	9	(France) Olivier Panis	BAR-Honda	1:13.122	+1.414	13
14	18	(United Kingdom) Eddie Irvine	Jaguar-Cosworth	1:13.189	+1.481	14
15	22	(Germany) Heinz-Harald Frentzen	Prost-Acer	1:13.281	+1.573	15
16	19	(Spain) Pedro de la Rosa	Jaguar-Cosworth	1:13.679	+1.971	16
17	21	(Spain) Fernando Alonso	Minardi-European	1:13.991	+2.283	17
18	10	(Canada) Jacques Villeneuve	BAR-Honda	1:14.012	+2.304	18
19	15	(Brazil) Enrique Bernoldi	Arrows-Asiatech	1:14.129	+2.421	19
20	14	(Netherlands) Jos Verstappen	Arrows-Asiatech	1:14.138	+2.430	20
21	23	(Czech Republic) Tomáš Enge	Prost-Acer	1:14.185	+2.477	21
22	20	(Malaysia) Alex Yoong	Minardi-European	1:15.247	+3.539	22
107% time: 1:16.728

Notes

- ^1 – Mika Häkkinen's fastest qualifying lap time of 1:11.945 was deleted for ignoring a red light during the warm-up session. This demoted him from second to fourth on the grid.

== Warm-up ==
A half hour warm-up session was held on September 30 at 08:30 Eastern Standard Time (UTC−05:00). It took place in sunny and bright weather, with temperatures steadily dropping. Drivers were slower than in qualifying due to the reduced track temperature. Ralf Schumacher set the fastest overall time of 1:13.912, followed by McLaren's Coulthard and Häkkinen, Michael Schumacher and Verstappen. Some drivers lost control of their cars during warm-up, with Coulthard damaging his undertray mounting the turn five high kerb. Montoya's engine failed in the spare Williams car setup for him eight minutes into the session, dropping oil and metal debris on the track between the banked turn 13 and the main straight. Race officials stopped the session for 15 minutes to allow marshals to clean the circuit. Häkkinen damaged the spare McLaren's right-hand side against the turn eight metal barrier shortly before warm-up ended. He was unhurt.

An hour before the race began, the stewards deleted Häkkinen's fastest qualifying lap for not noticing the red light situated on the left-hand side at the pit lane exit and overtaking cars stopped in a line waiting for the session to restart following Montoya's engine failure. His final grid position of fourth was determined by his second-fastest qualifying lap of 1:12.309. This promoted Williams teammates Ralf Schumacher and Montoya to second and third, respectively. McLaren did not appeal the penalty; the penalty angered Häkkinen, saying he believed it was unfair because his vision was impaired by the low sun's glare.

== Race ==
The 73-lap. 306.016 km (190.150 mi) race, began at 13:00 local time, an hour earlier than other Grands Prix to accommodate European television viewers. The weather on the grid were dry and sunny before the race; the air temperature was between 19 and 22 °C (66 and 72 °F) and the track temperature from 27 to 28 °C (81 to 82 °F). The pre-race ceremony, named United We Stand to commemorate "the international community as well as the United States and its heroes" was hosted by women's soccer player Brandi Chastain. Recording artist Patti LaBelle opened the ceremony by singing "God Bless America". Singer and Indiana native John Mellencamp performed his single "Peaceful World" from his album "Cuttin' Heads" and then the American Cabaret Theatre sung a patriotic melody. IMS pastor Mike Welch from the St. Christopher's Catholic Church delivered a sermon before the Indianapolis Children's Choir performed the American National Anthem.

Approximately between 175,000 and 200,000 spectators attended the race, with 1,000 free tickets given to off-duty police officers. Most spectators were from the United States, as most Europeans did not attend the event due to worries over possible airline cancellations following the September 11 attacks. Ferrari ran the harder Bridgestone tire compound while McLaren chose the softer option. When the race began, Montoya overtook teammate Ralf Schumacher off the line on the side of the track that offered him more grip and slipstreamed Michael Schumacher, who prevented him from trying a pass on the outside by driving across him to lead into the first corner. Behind them, Barrichello moved from fifth to third. Enge was stationary on the grid due to a clutch issue and had to start manually to get away from his starting spot, losing him ten seconds. Entering turn eight, Bernoldi avoided colliding with De la Rosa's Jaguar. At the end of the first lap, Michael Schumacher led Montoya by eight-tenths of a second, followed by Barrichello, Ralf Schumacher, Häkkinen and Coulthard.

The Sauber duo of Heidfeld and Räikkönen, as well as Trulli, went three-wide on the drive into turn one at the start of the second lap. Räikkönen was blocked off by Trulli's pincer manoeuvre (when attempting to pass him on the outside) and damaged his front wing against his teammate's rear-left wheel. When the lap ended, Räikkönen made an unscheduled pit stop to replace the front wing, but he retired on lap three after his left-rear driveshaft broking from colliding with Trulli. Heidfeld and Trulli's cars were undamaged. Barrichello was lapping faster than Montoya due to his smaller fuel load as a result of his two-stop strategy, and slipstreamed past him on the outside at the first turn for second to begin lap three. Both Ferraris began to distance themselves from Montoya, who showed signs of tire trouble, delaying his teammate Ralf Schumacher on a lesser fuel load and allowing Häkkinen and Coulthard to stay in contention. This came just as Barrichello began gaining on his teammate Michael Schumacher.

Further back, Button overtook Trulli for eighth while Irvine was passed by Alesi for eleventh. On lap five, Michael Schumacher realized that Barrichello was faster than him because of the latter's two-stop strategy and slowed slightly, letting his teammate by on the inside approaching turn eight at the end of the back straight and into the lead. Barrichello's string of fastest laps allowed him to draw away from the rest of the field and lead by 5.2 seconds on the tenth lap. Heideld attempted to pass Coulthard on the inside into turn one on lap nine. Despite failing to complete the manoevure, Heidfeld battled Coulthard for the next eight laps. Between the 13th and 14th laps, Alesi overtook Benetton teammates Button and Fisichella after braking on the inside into turn one, as the Benetton cars were difficult to drive due to rear tire wear. As the ambient temperature rose, the field became more dispersed by lap 19. As the tires degraded and cars became lighter when their fuel loads reduced, Montoya and Ralf Schumacher gained on Michael Schumacher by setting personal fastest laps from around lap 20. Because the wear and balance on the Williams cars remained consistent, Montoya's performance on the Michelin tires improved with time.

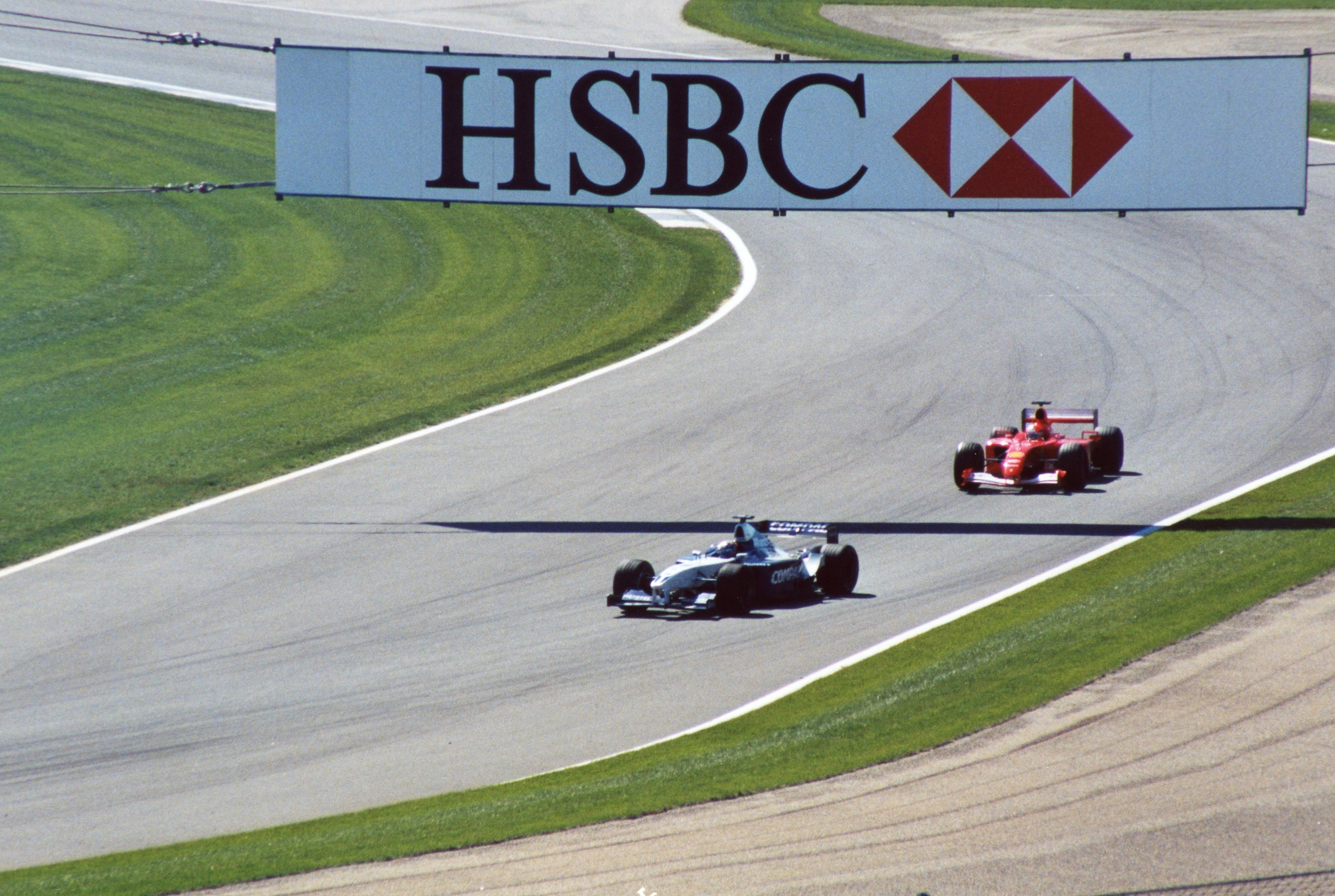
Juan Pablo Montoya leads Michael Schumacher through the infield section during the 2001 United States Grand Prix

Ralf Schumacher was the first of the leading drivers to enter the pit lane at the end of lap 23 for the first of two scheduled pit stops. He stopped for 12.5 seconds due to Williams mechanics struggling to replace the left-rear wheel because of a faulty wheel gun. Ralf Schumacher rejoined the track in ninth place. Barrichello led by 12.5 seconds when he made the first of two scheduled pit stops on lap 27. He rejoined the race in fifth behind Coulthard after a 8.6 second stop. Michael Schumacher led the next seven laps under pressure from Montoya, who had tried to slow him to allow Barrichello to make his pit stop. Montoya fell behind Michael Schumacher on lap 32 after losing control of his car in the infield section. As they came up to lap Yoong, Montoya slipstreamed past Michael Schumacher on the inside at the end of the main straight into turn one with his front tires locked through braking later than the latter for the lead on the 34th lap, with Schumacher giving Montoya enough space to avoid a crash. Montoya began pulling away from Michael Schumacher, setting the race's fastest lap and a new lap record of 1:14.448 on lap 35. He made his only scheduled pit stop for fuel and tires when lap 36 concluded because Williams were unable to take advantage of the full capacity of the car's large fuel tank at Indianapolis since it would have worn out the rear Michelin tyres if they put a large amount of fuel in. Montoya fell to fifth, behind Coulthard, and Michael Schumacher retook the lead.

On lap 37, Ralf Schumacher lost control of his car after locking the brakes into turn six, and his race finished in the gravel. Alonso entered the pit lane for a planned pit stop but was unable to continue due to a driveshaft failure a lap later. Michael Schumacher made his only stop on lap 39 and Häkkinen took the lead. He returned to the circuit in fourth. On the same lap, smoke billowed from the rear of Montoya's car going through the banked turn 13 due to faulty hydraulics, stopping after crossing the start-finish line. Double waved yellow flags came out as marshals moved Montoya's car from the circuit to avoid the deployment of the safety car. The yet-to-stop McLarens of Häkkinen and Coulthard continued to hold first and second through the low fuel consumption of their Mercedes engines and lapping quickly enough to exploit the situation but they encountered De la Rosa, Villeneuve and Alesi's slower cars. At this point, most drivers had yet to make another pit stop. Häkkinen had waited until the circuit was to his liking and was less hampered by traffic than teammate Coulthard, prompting the latter to make a 9.5-second pit stop on lap 43. Coulthard fell to fourth, behind Michael Schumacher.

Yoong retired his car with gearbox issues on the 44th lap. Häkkinen lapped faster than Barrichello since his car had less fuel, and he made his only pit stop from the lead when lap 45 concluded. His pit stop lasted 9.6 seconds and his pit crew's efficiency meant he rejoined in second, ahead of Michael Schumacher. De la Rosa and Villeneuve collided at the end of the back straight in turn eight on lap 43 as the former attempted to overtake the latter on the inside. Both drivers kept their engines running and continued. Villeneuve made a pit stop for a cursory examination of his car on the following lap but retired in the garage one lap later with left-front suspension damage. Verstappen retired on lap 47 due to a minor airbox bay fire. After Häkkinen's pit stop, Barrichello retook the lead and had to lead by half a minute to stay ahead of the Finn, having lost two or three seconds in his first two stints. His final pit stop came on lap 50, when he was over 22 seconds ahead of Häkkinen. The stop lasted 8.2 seconds and Barrichello fell to second, behind Häkkinen.

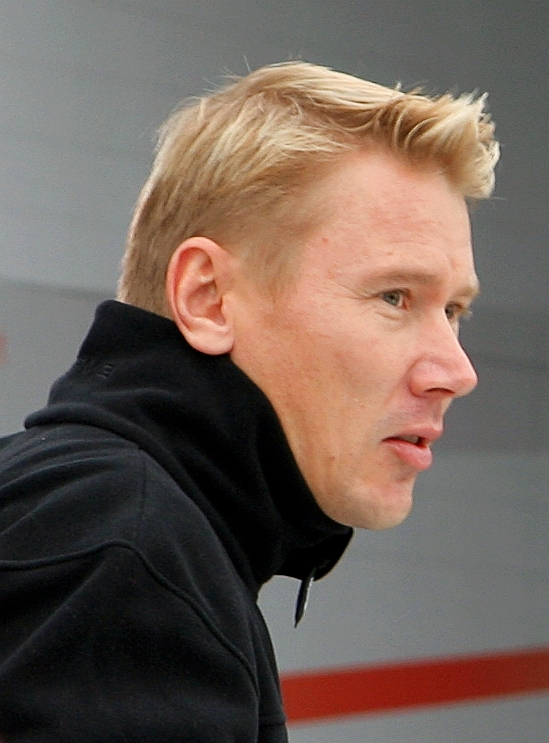
Mika Häkkinen (pictured in 2006) took the 20th and his final Grand Prix victory of his career despite being demoted from second to fourth on the grid for a pit lane infringement he committed during the warm-up session.

Irvine was the final driver to make a scheduled pit stop on lap 52, as part of Jaguar's strategy of going as far as possible without stopping. He fell from fifth to seventh. Irvine's tires were almost worn down to the canvas at this time, and the FIA officials took notice. On lap 56, Heidfeld lost sixth to Irvine at turn 11, who held off Heidfeld. Initially, it appeared that Barrichello would be unable to gain on Häkkinen, but he later lapped faster than the latter. Barrichello was 2.2 seconds behind Häkkinen on lap 61, when blue smoke began emanating from the rear of his Ferrari which gradually became larger but no oil was laid on the track. His engine began sounding rough on the front straight and he slowed considerably. Barrichello let Michael Schumacher through into second on the main straight on lap 70 and defended from Coulthard until he overtook him into the banked turn 13 for third on the next lap. On lap 72, Barrichello attempted to nurse his car to the finish by short-shifting to preserve the engine, and score some championship points to keep him in contention for second in the World Drivers' Championship but his engine seized on the back straight due to the loss of oil, locking his tires. He abandoned his Ferrari on the inside of the circuit before turn eight after spinning 90 degrees. This promoted Trulli to fourth, Irvine to fifth and Heidfeld to sixth.

Häkkinen kept the lead he had held for 23 laps and won his second race of the season and 20th (and final) victory of his career before going on a sabbatical from the 2002 season. Michael Schumacher finished second, 11 seconds behind, and held off the closing Coulthard in third. Trulli was provisionally fourth, Irvine fifth, and Heidfeld, after losing three gears, completed the points scorers in sixth place. Alesi lapped similarly to his teammate and finished seventh, ahead of the Benetton duo of Fisichella (who nursed a blistered rear tire) and Button in eighth and ninth, respectively. Frentzen, Panis and De la Rosa took the next three places. Bernoldi finished 13th in the spare Arrows car after hitting a piece of bodywork from De la Rosa's Jaguar that had detached on the front straight and became lodged in his radiator, causing his car to overheat. Enge and Barrichello (despite retiring) were the final classified finishers.

== Post-race ==
The top three drivers appeared on the podium to collect their trophies and spoke to the media in the subsequent press conference. Häkkinen characterized the win "one of the highlights of the season for me" and "one of my most important victories", saying it had been his objective to win the British Grand Prix and the United States Grand Prix in 2001. He said that he did not overthink victory while running fifth early in the race, instead focusing on his lap times and consistency. Michael Schumacher called his race "pretty straightforward" and added that he was struggling to cope with slower traffic prior to his first pit stop. He admitted that he was fortunate to finish second following Montoya's retirement. Coulthard stated that he benefited from events such as driver retirements, but acknowledged that he was fortunate to finish third as a result of that element, adding, "you have to take the results as they come."

Barrichello voiced his disappointment at retiring the Grand Prix two laps early, saying: "The feeling is horrible. It's very difficult to express what I'm feeling right now. I have shown that whenever I have the chance to win, I'm going for it." Montoya was philosophical, stating he could have won his second race in a row if his car had not suffered from hydraulic troubles, "I wanted to really go for the win here and it's a big disappointment we couldn't finish the race. My second F-1 win and two back-to-back here would have been brilliant." Trulii expressed satisfaction with finishing fourth and said that he set up his car to accommodate for the laying of tire rubber onto the track surface during the race. Irvine set his objective to pass Benetton for seventh in the World Constructors' Championship at the following Japanese Grand Prix after coming fifth. Villeneuve and De la Rosa blamed each other for their collision on lap 46.

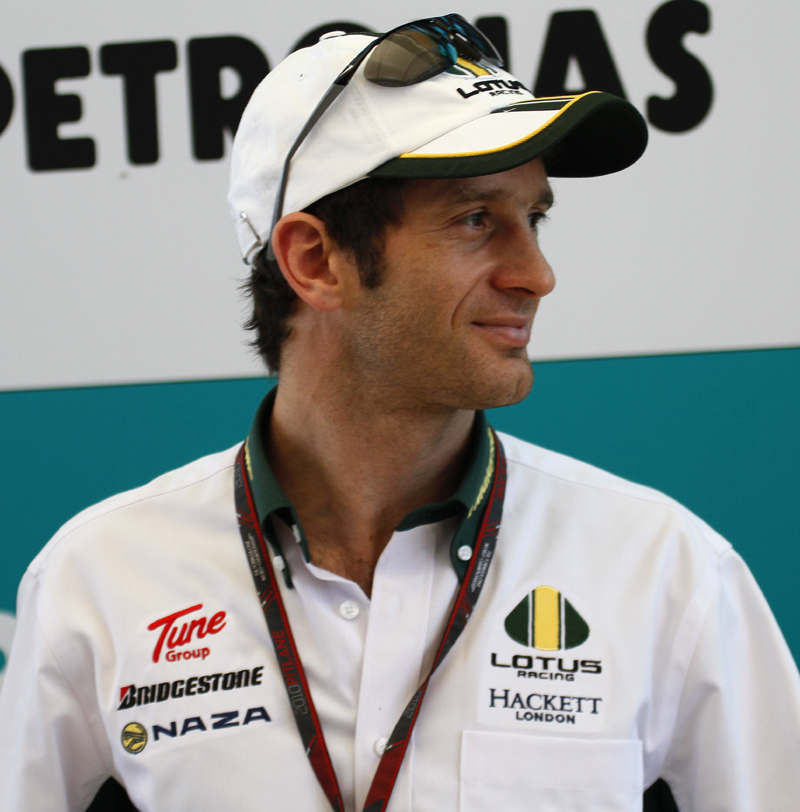
Jarno Trulli (pictured in 2010) was disqualified from fourth because of excess skid block wear but was reinstated on appeal due to a procedural error.

Several hours after the race, the thickness surrounding the rear hole of the wooden skid block (plank) fastened to the underside of Trulli's car was found to be 1.5 mm (0.059 in) greater than the minimum allowed by the regulations, possibly caused by the loosening of two fasteners designed to prevent such wear. As a result, the race stewards disqualified Trulli and promoted Irvine to fourth, Heidfeld to fifth, and Alesi to sixth. Team principal Eddie Jordan wrote in his 2007 autobiography An Independent Man that he received an anonymous telephone call suggesting the team should forensically review the three signatures on the FIA bulletin because a steward whose signature was on that bulletin was absent from the meeting with team manager Trevor Foster since he had left Indianapolis. Jordan appealed the decision through the Royal Irish Automobile Club, claiming that the rear fasteners broke loose during the race and caused the excessive wear. Three judges from the FIA International Court of Appeal met in Paris to hear the appeal on October 26. The FIA general secretary ruled that Trulli's disqualification should be reversed due to "a breach of the right of defence" since a steward was absent at the initial post-race hearing, a violation of the International Sporting Code. As a result, the stewards' decision was overturned, and Trulli returned to fourth.

Michael Schumacher's second-place final increased his championship points tally to 113, breaking the record he shared with Nigel Mansell for the most championship points scored in a single season by five points. Coulthard was now seven championship points ahead of Barrichello in the battle for second while Ralf Schumacher in fourth was another six points behind. Ferrari continued to lead the World Constructors' Championship with 167 championship points. McLaren's performance in Indianapolis secured them second place from Williams in the standings with one round remaining in the season.

== Race classification ==
Drivers who scored championship points are denoted in bold.

Pos	No.	Driver	Constructor	Tyre	Laps	Time/Retired	Grid	Points
1	3	(Finland) **Mika Häkkinen**	**McLaren-Mercedes**	B	73	1:32:42.840	4	10
2	1	(Germany) **Michael Schumacher**	**Ferrari**	B	73	+11.046	1	6
3	4	(United Kingdom) **David Coulthard**	**McLaren-Mercedes**	B	73	+12.043	7	4
4	11	(Italy) **Jarno Trulli**	**Jordan-Honda**	B	73	+57.423	8	3
5	18	(United Kingdom) **Eddie Irvine**	**Jaguar-Cosworth**	M	73	+1:12.434	14	2
6	16	(Germany) **Nick Heidfeld**	**Sauber-Petronas**	B	73	+1:12.996	6	1
7	12	(France) Jean Alesi	Jordan-Honda	B	72	+1 lap	9	
8	7	(Italy) Giancarlo Fisichella	Benetton-Renault	M	72	+1 lap	12	
9	8	(United Kingdom) Jenson Button	Benetton-Renault	M	72	+1 lap	10	
10	22	(Germany) Heinz-Harald Frentzen	Prost-Acer	M	72	+1 lap	15	
11	9	(France) Olivier Panis	BAR-Honda	B	72	+1 lap	13	
12	19	(Spain) Pedro de la Rosa	Jaguar-Cosworth	M	72	+1 lap	16	
13	15	(Brazil) Enrique Bernoldi	Arrows-Asiatech	B	72	+1 lap	19	
14	23	(Czech Republic) Tomáš Enge	Prost-Acer	M	72	+1 lap	21	
15	2	(Brazil) Rubens Barrichello	Ferrari	B	71	Engine	5	
Ret	10	(Canada) Jacques Villeneuve	BAR-Honda	B	45	Suspension / collision damage	18	
Ret	14	(Netherlands) Jos Verstappen	Arrows-Asiatech	B	44	Engine	20	
Ret	20	(Malaysia) Alex Yoong	Minardi-European	M	38	Gearbox	22	
Ret	6	(Colombia) Juan Pablo Montoya	Williams-BMW	M	38	Hydraulics	3	
Ret	21	(Spain) Fernando Alonso	Minardi-European	M	36	Driveshaft	17	
Ret	5	(Germany) Ralf Schumacher	Williams-BMW	M	36	Spun off	2	
Ret	17	(Finland) Kimi Räikkönen	Sauber-Petronas	B	2	Driveshaft	11	

== Championship standings after the race ==
Drivers' Championship standings

+/–	Pos	Driver	Points
	1	(Germany) Michael Schumacher*	113
	2	(United Kingdom) David Coulthard	61
	3	(Brazil) Rubens Barrichello	54
	4	(Germany) Ralf Schumacher	48
1	5	(Finland) Mika Häkkinen	34

Constructors' Championship standings

+/–	Pos	Constructor	Points
	1	(Italy) Ferrari*	167
	2	(United Kingdom) McLaren-Mercedes	95
	3	(United Kingdom) Williams-BMW	73
	4	(Switzerland) Sauber-Petronas	21
1	5	(Republic of Ireland) Jordan-Honda	19
Sources:

- Note: Only the top five positions are included for both sets of standings.
- Bold text and an asterisk indicates the 2001 World Champions.

Previous race: 2001 Italian Grand Prix	FIA Formula One World Championship; 2001 season	Next race: 2001 Japanese Grand Prix
Previous race: 2000 United States Grand Prix	United States Grand Prix	Next race: 2002 United States Grand Prix
