= Peaceful World (John Mellencamp song) =

Single by John Mellencamp featuring India Arie

from the album Cuttin' Heads
- Released: August 2001
- Genre: Rock, soul
- Length: 4:04
- Label: Columbia
- Songwriter: John Mellencamp
- Producer: John Mellencamp

John Mellencamp featuring India Arie singles chronology
"Yours Forever" (2000)	"Peaceful World" (2001)	"To Washington" (2003)

"Peaceful World" is a song written and recorded by the American rock artist John Mellencamp and India.Arie, which appeared on Mellencamp's album Cuttin' Heads. Mellencamp also included the track on his 2007 album 20th Century Masters: The Millennium Collection: The Best of John Mellencamp. The single was nominated for a Grammy Award for Best Male Rock Vocal Performance, but lost to "Dig In" by Lenny Kravitz.

The song was first played during the 2001 Indianapolis 500, during a commercial for the Indy Racing League, which Mellencamp's wife, Elaine Irwin Mellencamp, was a spokesperson for at the time. The song went on to be the official song of the League for the remainder of the 2001 Indy Racing League season.

== Background ==
"'Peaceful World' was extracted from a conversation with Pat Peterson, who's been singing backup in my touring band since 1981," Mellencamp explained to the Denver Post in an August 2001 feature. "She's my age, and I asked her, 'What's the one thing that's really disturbing to you?' There was no question about it - it's how this new rap music is really harmful to the black race.

"You have the new Uncle Tom, the guy wagging the $200,000 watch and saying, ... 'Gimme the money, man, look what I got that you ain't got ... I'll say whatever you want me to say, and when this (ends), I'll just go back to whatever I'm doing, and I don't care about the damage that I've done.' Meanwhile, white kids in suburbs who buy these records find it entertaining if not comical half the time. They have a really distorted view of what the black race is about. It's a very bad thing."

== Composition ==
The song's lyrics, which are sung in a duet form between Mellencamp and Arie, primarily deal with issues of race and prejudice.

The lyrics led it to be somewhat of a song of comfort following the September 11, 2001 attacks, being performed during The Concert for New York City along with a live acoustic version without Arie being included in Columbia Records' October 2001 benefit album God Bless America. Mellencamp also performed the song during the 2001 United States Grand Prix, which was held 3 weeks after the attacks.

== Music video ==
The music video of "Peaceful World", directed by Kurt Markus, shows Mellencamp and Arie in a mostly dark room, with only their faces shown. The two sing as selected lyrics from the song are flashed in front of them in light.

== Charts ==
Chart	Peak position
U.S. Billboard Adult Top 40	11
U.S. Billboard Hot Adult Contemporary Tracks	27
U.S. Billboard Mainstream Rock Tracks	38
U.S. Billboard Hot 100	104
