= Objects in the Mirror Are Closer Than They Appear (Confrontation Camp album) =

Studio album by Confrontation Camp
- Released: July 25, 2000
- Genre: Rap rock
- Length: 40:37
- Label: Artemis
- Producer: Chuck D; Kyle Jason; Professor Griff

Professional ratings
Review scores
Source	Rating
AllMusic	2/5 stars
Pitchfork Media	2.2/10
Robert Christgau	(2-star Honorable Mention)

Objects in the Mirror Are Closer Than They Appear is the only studio album by American rap rock supergroup Confrontation Camp. It was released on July 25, 2000 via Artemis Records. Production was handled by all the three members Professor Griff, Chuck D and Kyle Jason. The title is derived from the US safety warning for convex side mirrors in vehicles, "Objects in mirror are closer than they appear".

== Track listing ==
No.	Title	Writer(s)	Length
1.	"In"		0:24
2.	"Jailbreak"	Kyle Jason; Carlton Ridenhour; Richard Griffin; Brian Hardgrove	3:08
3.	"Break the Law"	Jason; Ridenhour; Griffin; Hardgrove; Jafar Mahmud; Wesley Little; Lord Aswod	3:47
4.	"Carry My Load"	Jason; Ridenhour; Griffin; Hardgrove	3:38
5.	"Jasper"		4:07
6.	"Che"		3:54
7.	"Against the Elements"		3:48
8.	"When the Shit Hits the Fans"		3:48
9.	"Babies Makin Babies Killin Babies"		4:00
10.	"Grudge"		3:23
11.	"U R Us"		2:44
12.	"Out"		0:37
13.	"Super Egoman"		3:19
Total length:			40:37

== Personnel ==
Confrontation Camp

- Kyle Jason — vocals, guitar, programming
- Richard "Professor Griff" Griffin — rap vocals, programming
- Carlton "Mistachuck" Ridenhour — rap vocals

Chaingang

- Brian Hardgroove — bass guitar
- Jafar A. Mahmud — guitar
- Wes Little — drums
- DJ Lord Aswod — turntables

Additional musicians

- Stian Lorentzen — guitar
