= The Blues: Godfathers and Sons =

2003 documentary film

Godfathers and Sons
- Directed by: Marc Levin
- Produced by: Daphne Pinkerson; Marc Levin
- Starring: Marshall Chess; Chuck D
- Cinematography: Mark Benjamin
- Edited by: Bob Eisenhardt
- Release date: October 2, 2003
- Running time: 133 minutes

Godfathers and Sons is a documentary directed by Marc Levin. The film is part of The Blues, a seven part PBS series, with Martin Scorsese as executive producer.

== Synopsis ==
Godfathers and Sons follows Producer Marshall Chess as he remembers his father Leonard Chess' contribution to Chicago blues history as the co-founder of Chess Records, and his own production of the controversial album Electric Mud. Chess organizes a reunion of the musicians that made Electric Mud to record new versions of Muddy Waters's blues standard "Mannish Boy," with contributions by hip hop artists, including Chuck D of Public Enemy, Common & Kyle Jason. The film includes never-before-seen archival footage of Howlin' Wolf, Muddy Waters and the Paul Butterfield Blues Band, and original performances by Koko Taylor, Otis Rush, Magic Slim, Ike Turner, and Sam Lay.

== Critical reception ==
Variety (September 2, 2003): "Bonus is Levin’s technique — he adds a cinema verite take on the city’s contempo club scene to his blues ‘n’ rap story and adds a few B&W clips from the 1960s that make the blues appear regal, vital and thriving. For story and filmmaking technique alone, “Godfathers & Sons” is the crown jewel in the Scorsese series."
