= 2001 Japanese Grand Prix =

Final round of the 2001 Formula One season

Coordinates: 34°50′35″N 136°32′26″E

Race 17 of 17 in the 2001 Formula One World Championship
| ← Previous race | Next race → |

Race details
- Date: 14 October 2001
- Official name: 2001 Fuji Television Japanese Grand Prix
- Location: Suzuka Circuit, Suzuka, Mie, Japan
- Course: Permanent racing facility
- Course length: 5.859 km (3.641 miles)
- Distance: 53 laps, 310.331 km (192.831 miles)
- Weather: Cloudy, mild, dry, air temp: 24°C
- Attendance: 310,000

Pole position
| Driver | (Germany) Michael Schumacher | Ferrari |
- Time: 1:32.484

Fastest lap
| Driver | (Germany) Ralf Schumacher (Note: Juan Pablo Montoya originally set the fastest lap 1:36.450, but his time was discredited due to him cutting the chicane. Ralf Schumacher, initially having the second-fastest lap, was recognised for setting the fastest lap of the race.) | Williams-BMW |
- Time: 1:36.944 on lap 46

Podium
| First | (Germany) Michael Schumacher | Ferrari |
| Second | (Colombia) Juan Pablo Montoya | Williams-BMW |
| Third | (United Kingdom) David Coulthard | McLaren-Mercedes |

The 2001 Japanese Grand Prix (formally the 2001 Fuji Television Japanese Grand Prix) was a Formula One motor race held before 150,000 spectators on 14 October 2001, at the Suzuka Circuit in Suzuka, Mie, Japan. It was the 17th and final round of the 2001 Formula One World Championship. Ferrari's Michael Schumacher won the 53-lap race from pole position. Williams driver Juan Pablo Montoya finished in second and McLaren's David Coulthard was third.

World Drivers' Champion Michael Schumacher qualified on pole position by setting the fastest lap time in the one-hour qualifying session. Montoya started from second, alongside Schumacher. The Ferrari driver held off Montoya's attack to take the lead on the first lap, losing it only during the race leaders' two pit stops. Schumacher won the race, with Montoya 3.1 seconds behind. Coulthard finished third, having been let past by McLaren teammate Mika Häkkinen in the final five laps of the Grand Prix, with the latter competing in his final Formula One Grand Prix, having won 20 races and two World Drivers' Championships throughout his ten-year career.

Schumacher's victory was his ninth of the season, tying his own record of most wins in one season from 1995 and 2000 and Nigel Mansell from 1992. As a consequence of the race, Schumacher finished the year with a season-record 123 championship points scored in the World Drivers' Championship, breaking Alain Prost's all-time record for most career points scored. Coulthard finished the season as the runner-up, 56 points behind Schumacher. Ferrari finished 77 points ahead of McLaren in the World Constructors' Championship.

== Background ==
The 2001 Japanese Grand Prix was the 17th and final Formula One race of the 2001 Formula One World Championship, held on 14 October 2001, at the 5.859 km (3.641 mi) Suzuka Circuit in Suzuka, Mie, Japan. Some news websites incorrectly reported that the event would be postponed due to the United States invasion of Afghanistan after the previous month's September 11 attacks in the United States but the Fédération Internationale de l'Automobile (FIA; Formula One's governing body) issued a statement refuting the reports.

Before the race, both the World Drivers' Championship and World Constructors' Championship were already won, with Ferrari driver Michael Schumacher having secured the World Drivers' Championship four races earlier in the Hungarian Grand Prix and Ferrari took the World Constructors' Championship at the same event, with McLaren too many championship points behind to be able to catch them. In the battle for the runner-up spot, McLaren's David Coulthard led Ferrari's Rubens Barrichello by seven points. To gain second place in the championship, Barrichello had to win the Grand Prix and Coulthard finish fifth or below. Sauber were battling Jordan for fourth position in the World Constructors' Championship and were five points ahead, but an appeal against Jarno Trulli's disqualification from the preceding United States Grand Prix would have reduced their advantage by two points if successful.

Following the United States Grand Prix on 30 September, between 2 October and 6, most teams evaluated car components, aerodynamic packages, racing setups and tyres at various European racing circuits at several European racetracks in preparation for the Japanese Grand Prix. British American Racing (BAR), Sauber and Jordan each tested for three days at Italy's Mugello Circuit, while Benetton, Jaguar, McLaren and Williams were at Spain's Circuit de Catalunya for three days. Ferrari spent six days at the Italian Fiorano Circuit with test driver Luca Badoer and Michael Schumacher. The Arrows, Minardi and Prost teams did not test at the period, instead focussing on the development of their 2002 cars.

The press speculated whether Michael Schumacher would help his teammate Barrichello become the championship runner-up in Japan. Michael Schumacher commented he was "only interested in winning" but added there was a small possibility Ferrari could help Barrichello finish second. Barrichello had been asked twice to aid Michael Schumacher this season and wanted to secure second in the standings without his teammate's assistance, saying, "After the team won the championship with Michael it has been proved that with a little bit of help and a little bit more attention I can do the job. But at the end of the day I have to win the race and David has to finish fifth or lower, so it's a hard task." Coulthard stated that he came to Japan to win the Grand Prix and finish second in the championship.

There were eleven two-driver teams, each representing a different constructor, with no changes to the entry list from the previous race. This was the final Grand Prix for Jordan's Jean Alesi and McLaren's two-time World Champion Mika Häkkinen. It was also the last Grand Prix for the Prost squad, who went bankrupt and closed down the following off-season, and for the Benetton team as it was renamed as Renault in deference to the team's French owners for 2002. Several teams used experimental solutions to Japan to guide the development of their 2002 vehicles. Ferrari brought a lighter, more rigid F2001 chassis while McLaren introduced no particular innovations and Williams used a top-exit exhaust featured at the United States Grand Prix on both their racing cars. Honda supplied BAR and Jordan with a new V10 engine specification while Cosworth did the same for Jaguar. Renault provided Benetton with a new qualifying engine for the team's final race. Arrows installed the aerodynamic package used at the Hungarian Grand Prix on their A22 cars and Minardi installed new titanium gearboxes in both cars.

== Practice ==
A total of four practice sessions preceded Sunday's race, two one-hour sessions on Friday and two 45-minute sessions on Saturday. The first practice session took place on Friday morning in sunny weather. Michael Schumacher posted the quickest lap time of 1:37.443 44 minutes in, 0.355 seconds ahead of Häkkinen. They were ahead of Williams's Juan Pablo Montoya, Barrichello, Alesi, Coulthard, Montoya's teammate Ralf Schumacher, Prost's Heinz-Harald Frentzen, Jaguar's Pedro de la Rosa and Sauber's Nick Heidfeld. Some drivers went off the track during the session. With one minute left, Tomáš Enge lost control of his Prost car at an apex, going off the racing line and oversteering across the gravel trap at 130R corner. He struck the tyre barrier at high speed, removing his two right-hand side wheels. Enge complained of neck pain, but exited the car unaided as practice was red-flagged. He did not participate in the second practice session.

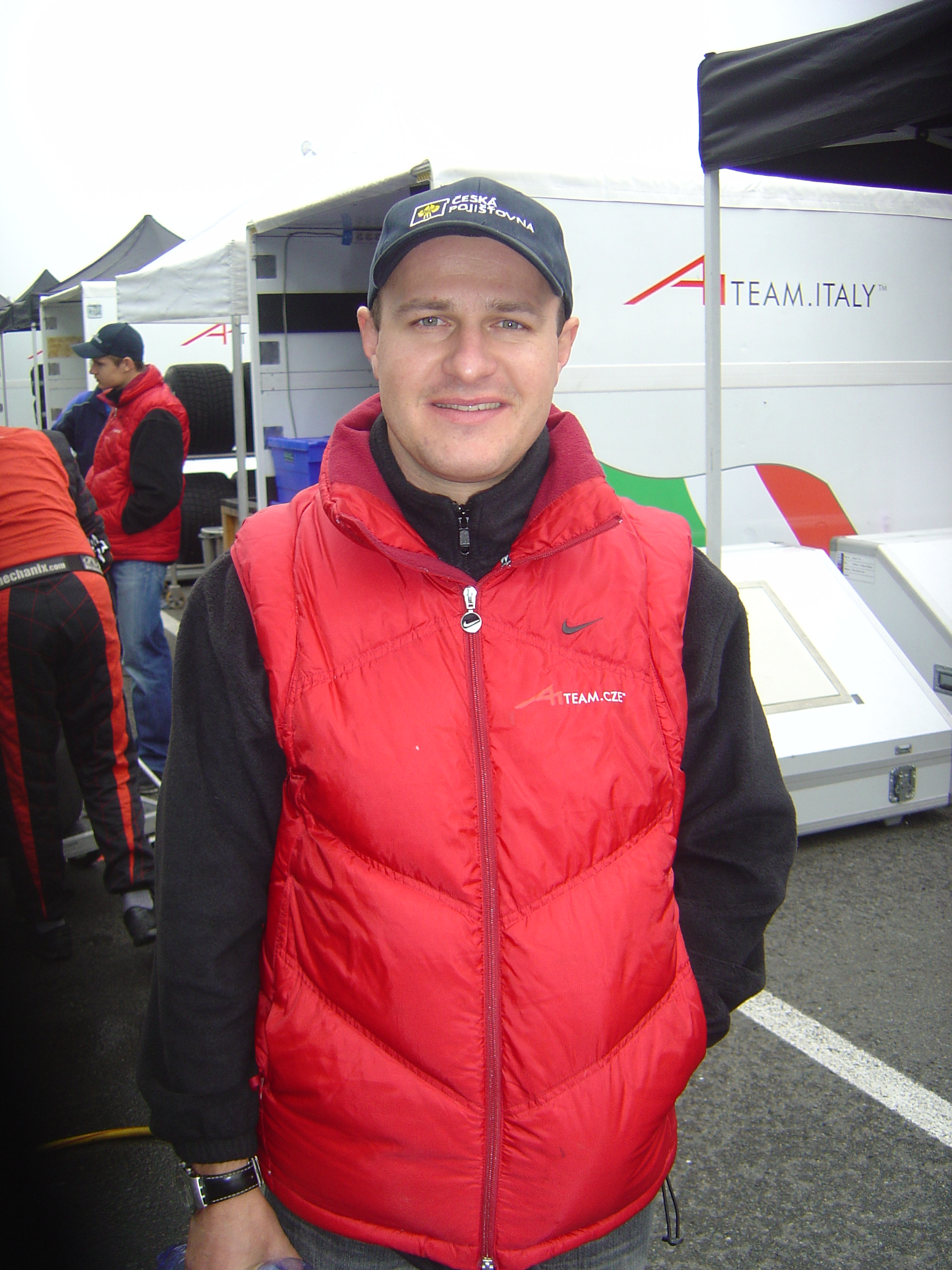
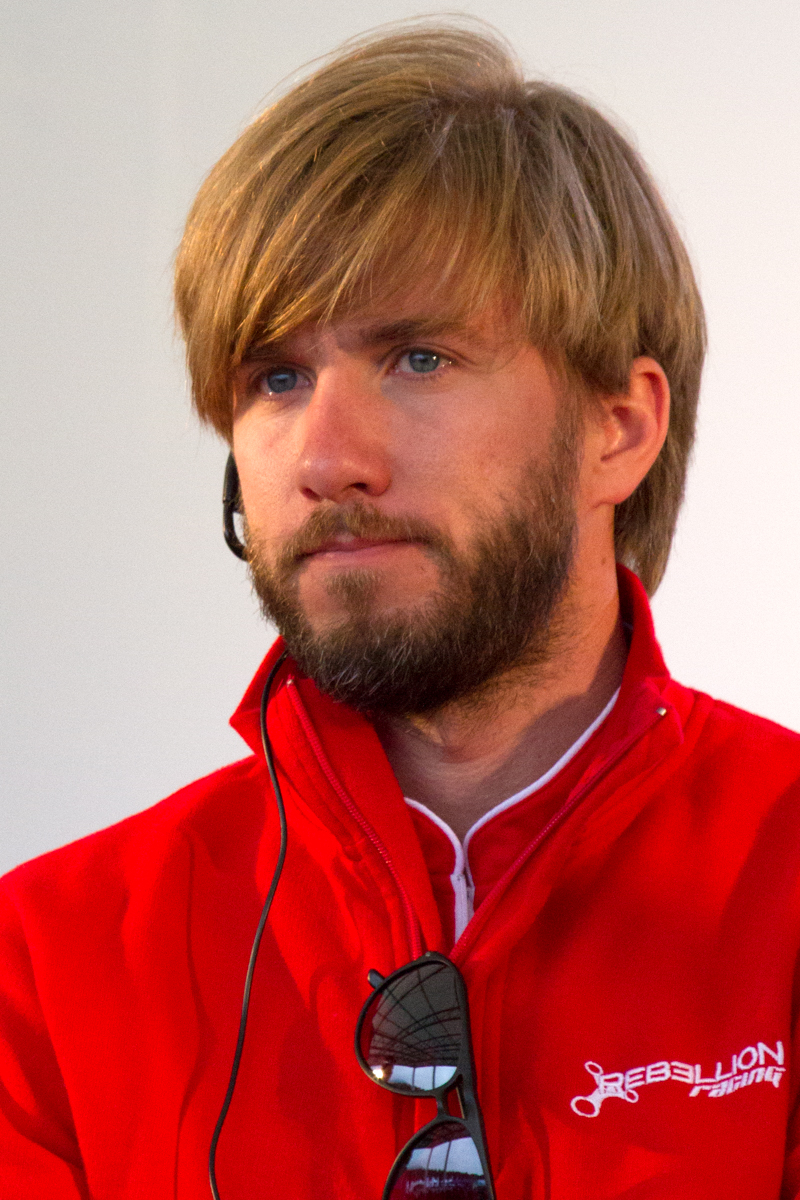
Tomáš Enge (left) and Nick Heidfeld (right) both sustained heavy accidents during the two free practice sessions held on the Friday before the race.

The weather remained sunny for the afternoon's second session. On a light fuel load, Alesi set the day's fastest lap time of 1:35.454, 0.523 seconds faster than the second-placed Montoya. De la Rosa, Häkkinen, Frentzen, Jaguar's Eddie Irvine, Coulthard, Michael Schumacher, Ralf Schumacher and Barrichello followed in the top ten. Halfway through the session, Heidfeld was on his first quick lap on a new set of soft Bridgestone tyres when he lost control of his vehicle's front into the final right-hand corner in the S-Curve section and spun backwards into the inside tyre barrier at 150 mph (240 km/h). He stopped in the circuit's centre, suffering a minor headache and debris was littered across the track. Heidfeld was transported to the medical centre, and practice was stopped for ten minutes. Late in the session, Coulthard spun into the turn two gravel trap; his right-front brake assembly caught fire in the pit lane when a stretch of trap tape that had not been entirely ripped from a duct became entangled in the brake cooling duct and was ignited by the brake's heat.

The third practice session was held on Saturday morning in sunny conditions. Michael Schumacher was the first driver to lap under 1:35 all weekend, and he was also the fastest, lapping at 1:34.711 with eight minutes left. He was 0.332 seconds faster than Häkkinen, who was followed by Barrichello, Coulthard, the Williams combination of Ralf Schumacher and Montoya, Sauber's Kimi Räikkönen, Trulli, Benetton's Jenson Button and Frentzen in third to tenth. With three minutes left in the final session, Ralf Schumacher set the first sub-1:34 lap in Suzuka history, at 1:33.969. He outpaced teammate Montoya, Coulthard, Michael Schumacher, Button, Trulli, Heidfeld, Häkkinen, Barrichello, and BAR's Jacques Villeneuve in the next nine positions.

== Qualifying ==
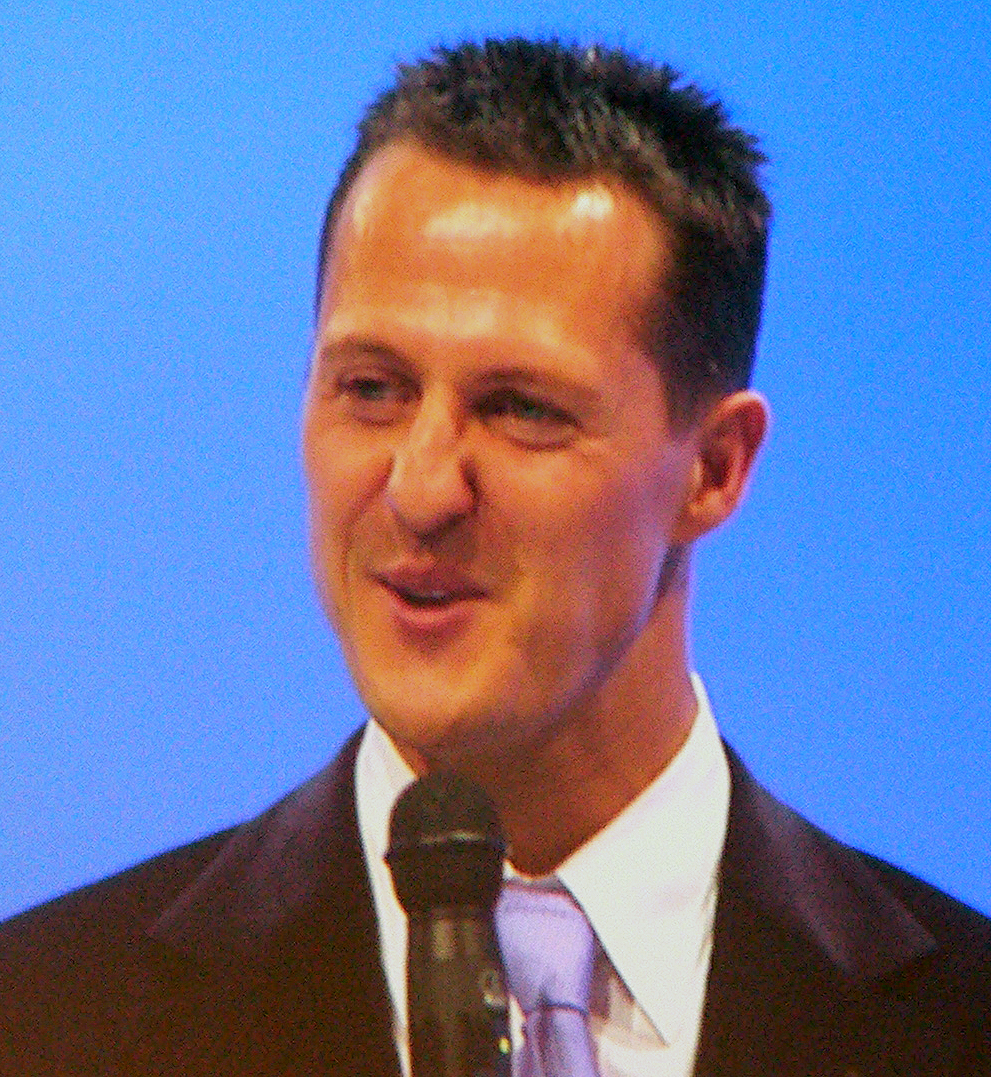
Michael Schumacher (pictured in 2007), the 2001 World Drivers' Championship, qualified on pole position and went on to win the race the following day.

During Saturday's one-hour qualifying session, each driver was limited to twelve laps, with the starting positions determined by the drivers' fastest laps. The 107% rule was in force during this session, forcing each driver to stay within 107% of the quickest lap time in order to qualify for the race. Michael Schumacher improved his lap time in three of his four runs, and clinched his 11th pole position of the season and the 43rd of his career with a time of 1:32.484 on a new set of tyres. He broke Gerhard Berger's all-time lap record on the circuit, set in 1991. Montoya had a minor car balance issue on a low fuel load than Michael Schumacher, although he was faster in the track's faster sectors. He was seven-tenths of a second behind in second, having been unable to improve on his final run. Ralf Schumacher was 0.111 seconds slower than his teammate in third, but he was pleased that no one was blocking him to the end of qualifying. Barrichello was unable to eliminate the understeer in his Ferrari, preventing him from lapping faster, and qualified fourth. Häkkinen, fifth, had his car's ride height and tyre pressures adjusted but his understeer persisted. Giancarlo Fisichella took sixth after Renault's new engine was fitted in his Benetton car. Coulthard qualified in seventh. Trulli, eighth, was hampered somewhat by slower cars in the second sector during his quickest lap. Button achieved his best qualifying result of the season in ninth, citing excess oversteer on his team's setup. Heidfeld took 10th, having encountered slower cars on his final run and lost downforce.

Alesi finished 11th in his final Formula One qualifying session, despite working with race engineer David Brown to unsuccessfully narrow the gap on teammate Trulli. Räikkönen learnt his car was 12 kg (26 lb) overweight anda an understeer on his last run slowed him through the Esses, leaving him in 12th. Irvine trailed his teammate De la Rosa by half a second in engine power but qualified ahead of him in 13th. Villenueve, 14th, was pleased with his car's balance and made setup tweaks that did not produce the predicted results. Frentzen's first run placed him 15th, and he was unable to lap quicker due to understeer on the soft Michelin tyres. De la Rosa took 16th, with his best lap coming on his third attempt, after failing to find a suitable balance for his car's tyres. BAR's Olivier Panis reported that his car felt slightly better en route to 17th. Fernando Alonso extracted additional performance from his Minardi car and improved on each lap to qualify 18th. Enge drove the spare Prost AP04 car following his accident the day before, setting his fastest lap on his first run before being stopped by modifications and claiming 19th. The Arrows duo of Enrique Bernoldi and Jos Verstappen qualified 20th and 21st, respectively. Bernoldi had slower cars on his fastest lap, but Verstappen drove a car lacking in pace but had decent handling. Minardi's Alex Yoong completed the starting order in 22nd, expressing disappointment over not improving greatly on each of his runs and traffic possibly stopping him from lapping faster during his third run.

=== Qualifying classification ===
| Pos | No | Driver | Constructor | Lap | Gap | Grid |
|---|---|---|---|---|---|---|
| 1 | 1 | (Germany) Michael Schumacher | Ferrari | 1:32.484 | — | 1 |
| 2 | 6 | (Colombia) Juan Pablo Montoya | Williams-BMW | 1:33.184 | +0.700 | 2 |
| 3 | 5 | (Germany) Ralf Schumacher | Williams-BMW | 1:33.297 | +0.813 | 3 |
| 4 | 2 | (Brazil) Rubens Barrichello | Ferrari | 1:33.323 | +0.839 | 4 |
| 5 | 3 | (Finland) Mika Häkkinen | McLaren-Mercedes | 1:33.662 | +1.178 | 5 |
| 6 | 7 | (Italy) Giancarlo Fisichella | Benetton-Renault | 1:33.830 | +1.346 | 6 |
| 7 | 4 | (United Kingdom) David Coulthard | McLaren-Mercedes | 1:33.916 | +1.432 | 7 |
| 8 | 11 | (Italy) Jarno Trulli | Jordan-Honda | 1:34.002 | +1.518 | 8 |
| 9 | 8 | (United Kingdom) Jenson Button | Benetton-Renault | 1:34.375 | +1.891 | 9 |
| 10 | 16 | (Germany) Nick Heidfeld | Sauber-Petronas | 1:34.386 | +1.902 | 10 |
| 11 | 12 | (France) Jean Alesi | Jordan-Honda | 1:34.420 | +1.936 | 11 |
| 12 | 17 | (Finland) Kimi Räikkönen | Sauber-Petronas | 1:34.581 | +2.097 | 12 |
| 13 | 18 | (United Kingdom) Eddie Irvine | Jaguar-Cosworth | 1:34.851 | +2.367 | 13 |
| 14 | 10 | (Canada) Jacques Villeneuve | BAR-Honda | 1:35.109 | +2.625 | 14 |
| 15 | 22 | (Germany) Heinz-Harald Frentzen | Prost-Acer | 1:35.132 | +2.648 | 15 |
| 16 | 19 | (Spain) Pedro de la Rosa | Jaguar-Cosworth | 1:35.639 | +3.155 | 16 |
| 17 | 9 | (France) Olivier Panis | BAR-Honda | 1:35.766 | +3.282 | 17 |
| 18 | 21 | (Spain) Fernando Alonso | Minardi-European | 1:36.410 | +3.926 | 18 |
| 19 | 23 | (Czech Republic) Tomáš Enge | Prost-Acer | 1:36.446 | +3.962 | 19 |
| 20 | 15 | (Brazil) Enrique Bernoldi | Arrows-Asiatech | 1:36.885 | +4.401 | 20 |
| 21 | 14 | (Netherlands) Jos Verstappen | Arrows-Asiatech | 1:36.973 | +4.489 | 21 |
| 22 | 20 | (Malaysia) Alex Yoong | Minardi-European | 1:38.246 | +5.762 | 22 |
107% time: 1:38.958

== Warm-up ==
On race morning, teams had a half-hour warm-up session to fine-tune their cars for the event in sunny weather. Michael Schumacher was the fastest driver in the session, with a lap time of 1:36.231. Coulthard was 0.454 seconds slower in second position. Heidfeld set a lap late on to go third-fastest. Trulli, Alesi, Häkkinen, Barrichello, Frentzen, Räikkönen and De la Rosa in the highest-placed Michelin-shod car occupied positions four to ten. During the session, no incidents occurred, and some drivers drove their team's spare cars, with the majority of Michelin-shod cars having their tyres scrubbed.

== Race ==
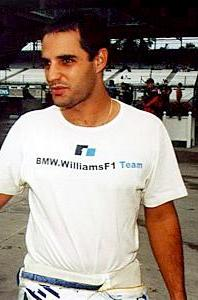
Juan Pablo Montoya (pictured in 2002) finished in second position

The 53-lap race began at 14:30 local time and drew 150,000 spectators. The weather was fine and dry, with the air temperature 24 °C (75 °F) and the track temperature was between 26 and 27 °C (79 and 81 °F). Yoong started from the pit lane in Alonso's spare Minardi car when his crew identified an electrical problem with his race car's gearbox. Bernoldi stalled on the dummy grid and could not restart his car, thus he was pushed into a gap into the pit lane, where he began. When the red lights went out to start the race, Michael Schumacher veered to the right to the inside line, blocking the fast-starting Montoya, to keep the race lead into the first corner. Ralf Schumacher briefly challenged his teammate but remained in third place. Fisichella made a fast start due to his car's powerful launch control system, passing Häkkinen for fifth. Barrichello had a small fuel load since Ferrari had put him on a three-stop strategy to try to move to the front of the field. He overtook Ralf Schumacher on the inside for third into the left-hand 130R turn.

Michael Schumacher had a 3.6-second lead over Montoya after the first lap. The two drivers were in turn followed by Barrichello, Ralf Schumacher, Fisichella and Häkkinen. Michael Schumacher began to pull away from the rest of the field, because he was on a new set of tyres and not affected by aerodynamic turbulence, whilst Montoya began the race on a set of scrubbed tyres that required longer to operate in comparison to the Bridgestones. On lap two, Barrichello overtook Montoya on the inside on the approach to the chicane for second place, avoiding contact with the Williams driver by placing two wheels off the circuit. However, Montoya had greater speed coming out of the chicane on the following lap, allowing him to slipstream by Barrichello and retake second at the end of the start-finish straight into the first corner. During the same lap, Fisichella spun 180 degrees leaving the Denger Curve corner. He was able to continue driving, but dropped from fifth to 12th. Frentzen had an unplanned pit stop on lap four to replace a dislodged nose cone after swerving to avoid colliding with De la Rosa at the chicane to finish lap two. Panis overtook Alonso for 17th on the same lap.

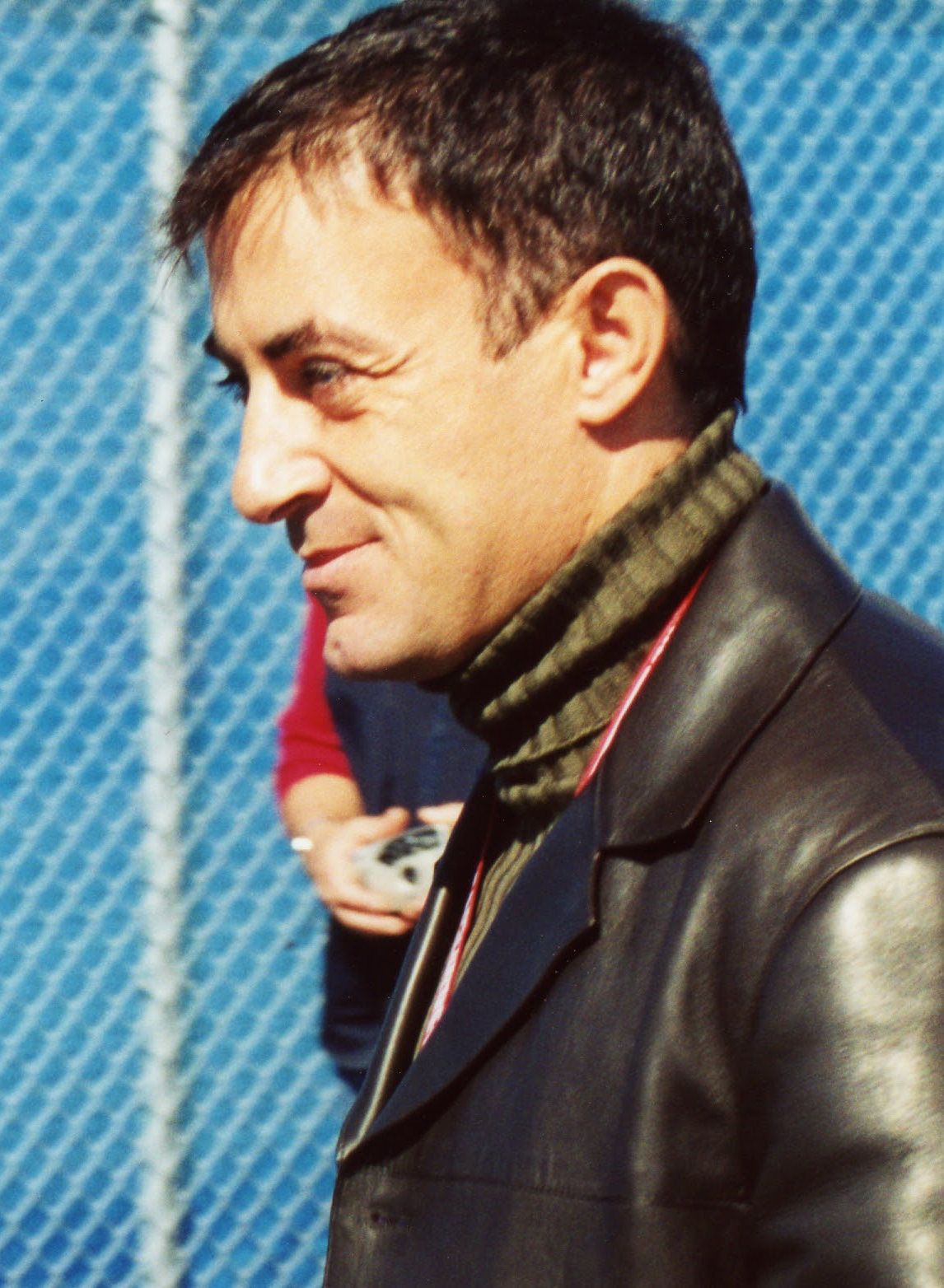
Jean Alesi was battling Sauber driver Kimi Räikkönen for ninth when Räikkönen lost control of his car on lap six and Alesi was caught up in the accident.

On lap six, Räikkönen, in ninth, suffered a left-rear suspension failure due to a bump at the exit of the Dunlop Curve. His car immediately went into a high-speed spin. Alesi was battling Räikkönen for position and steered right. However, he collided with the right-rear of Räikkönen's car at 125 mph (201 km/h) as they slid off to the outside of the track. Both men struck the barriers, littering debris and wheels on the track and one avoided hitting another driver. Räikkönen's nose cone grazed Alesi's helmet. Approaching cars had to take evasive measures to avoid the detached wheels, but officials did not use the safety car to close the field after determining that debris had not encroached onto the track. Räikkönen complained of head and neck pains and was transported to the medical centre. Meanwhile, Fisichella passed Irvine for ninth as they passed through the accident scene. Michael Schumacher slid on the grass on lap nine after missing his braking point for the final chicane. He remained in the lead. Montoya began to stabilise the deficit on Michael Schumacher from lap ten, as his Michelin tyres appeared to perform better as they wore down.

Fisichella overtook his teammate Button for eighth on lap 12. Barrichello was unable to pass Montoya, thus the plan for Michael Schumacher to let him past was abandoned. On lap 16, he entered the pit lane for the first of three scheduled stops. Barrichello's stop lasted 7.2 seconds and fell from third to eighth, just behind the duel between Trulli and Fisichella. He passed Fisichella for seventh at the chicane as both Fisichella and Trulli entered the pit lane on lap 17. Michael Schumacher entered the pit lane after the next lap ended to make the first of two scheduled pit stops. The stop lasted 8.8 seconds and he rejoined the circuit in fourth, behind Häkkinen. Montoya took the race lead and held it for three laps before making his first pit stop on lap 21, dropping him to fifth, ahead of Barrichello but behind Coulthard. This put his teammate Ralf Schumacher in front until his own pit stop two laps later. Häkkinen took the lead on lap 24, but his pit stop returned Michael Schumacher to the lead. He had held off Michael Schumacher for the previous five laps, during which Schumacher was unable to use his new tyres correctly, losing more than a second per lap.

Irvine retired in the pit lane on lap 25 when the two Intertechnique fuel rig power sources failed, preventing Jaguar from inserting fuel into his car. During a battle with Barrichello, the FIA stewards placed Ralf Schumacher under investigation for repeatedly cutting the final chicane and gaining an advantage; the stewards had previously notified the Williams team of the infringement by email. He was assessed a ten-second stop-and-go penalty on lap 28, serving it two laps later. At the same time, Barrichello made his second pit stop. As both drivers exited the pit lane, Barrichello's engine either died or his pit lane speed limiter activated, taking Ralf Schumacher by surprise and passing him. Ralf Schumacher crossed to the right over the white line separating the pit lane from the race circuit. The FIA stewards decided not to penalise Ralf Schumacher, deeming him to have not anticipated Barrichello going slowly.

On lap 32, Barrichello overtook Ralf Schumacher for fifth place on the inside into the last chicane. Ralf Schumacher cut the chicane for the third time to stay ahead of Barrichello and avoid a collision, retaking the position. Barrichello managed to slipstream by Ralf Schumacher on the inside at the end of the start-finish straight. Ralf Schumacher was not penalised for cutting the chicane on that occasion. Michael Schumacher became the first of the leading drivers to make a second pit stop on lap 36. The stop lasted nine seconds and fell to third, behind Häkkinen. This returned Montoya to the race lead, but he was hampered by slower vehicles, preventing him from extracting the necessary pace to keep the lead. Both he and Häkkinen entered the pit lane for their second pit stops on lap 38. Michael Schumacher thus returned to first place, as Coulthard made his final pit stop on the 40th lap. Barrichello was the final front runner to enter the pit lane for a second pit stop two laps later. He rejoined in fifth, ahead of Ralf Schumacher but behind Coulthard.

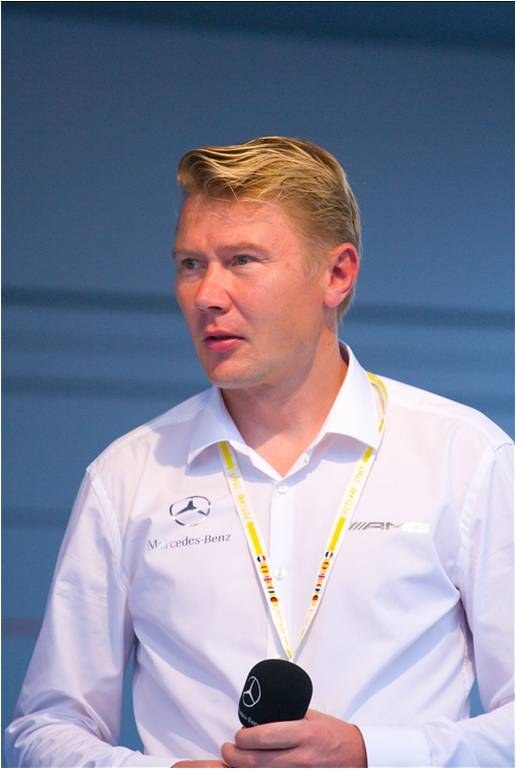
Mika Häkkinen (pictured in 2009) allowed his McLaren teammate David Coulthard to take third place in the final five laps of the race.

After all of the leading drivers had completed their second pit stops, Michael Schumacher led Montoya, Häkkinen, Coulthard, Barrichello, and Ralf Schumacher. Enge retired from the race in the Prost garage with a brake issue on lap 46. Another retirement occurred when De la Rosa parked his car, which lacked downforce and had an oil leak, after 45 laps. Fisichella was in seventh when he lost fourth gear and slowed on track on lap 48. He entered the pit lane, marking the Grand Prix's final retirement. That promoted Fisichella's teammate Button into seventh. On lap 49, while on the start-finish straight, Häkkinen pulled over and let his teammate Coulthard past into third position. Häkkinen wanted to repay Coulthard for assisting him to win the 1997 European Grand Prix and the 1998 Australian Grand Prix. On lap 50, Villeneuve lost ninth to Heidfeld after losing control of his car at the final chicane.

Montoya pushed hard and closed on Michael Schumacher, but the former held on for the rest of the race to win his ninth race of the season and 53rd overall. He equalled his own record of the most wins in one season in 1995 with Benetton, 2000 with Ferrari and Nigel Mansell with Williams in 1992. Montoya came in second, 3.1 seconds behind, while Coulthard finished third. Häkkinen was fourth, with Barrichello fifth and Ralf Schumacher completing the points-paying positions in sixth. Button took seventh with Trulli eighth. Heidfeld took ninth after losing downforce and Villeneuve was tenth. Alonso finished 11th because cars ahead of him retired. Frentzen was 12th with Panis 13th after chassis adjustments slowed him. Bernoldi and Verstappen of Arrows finished 14th and 15th, respectively, after serving ten-second stop-and-go penalties and experiencing power steering failures. Yoong took 16th, registering his first Formula One finish; he was in pain since his seat position had given him a back cramp. Despite retiring, Fisichella was the final classified finisher.

=== Post-race ===
The top three drivers appeared on the podium to collect their trophies and spoke to the media at the press conference held afterwards. Michael Schumacher agreed that winning the Grand Prix was the conclusion "to the perfect Formula One season", adding, "Obviously, we've had maybe two races which have been a little bit difficult for us, Monza and Indianapolis, now we're back to normality and that's a great end and a great result for the championship we have achieved, to finish off the season for the team, for everyone." Montoya thought it was "a good race" to its conclusion and commented on the Michelin tyres, "The car was good, but while the tyres come in, we lose so much time, as we saw with Michael. When he was on new tyres and I was on scrubbed tyres, while the tyres take five or six laps to come in, there's just no competition." Coulthard said that finishing second in the championship was the best possible result for him, adding, "It's nice to finish the season, as Michael said, on the podium. To win would have been fantastic but I've never been that good around Suzuka, so it isn't a bad result."

Alesi's crash with Räikkönen on lap six prevented him from being the first driver since Richie Ginther in 1964 to finish every race of the season. He commented that he was "so relieved that I did not hurt him as he spun right in front of me and there was no way I could avoid him. It is sad to finish my career this way, but that is motor racing and I have to accept this situation." Räikkönen said he was unsure as to what caused the crash but called it "a pretty big shunt and I have a bit of a head and neck ache, but otherwise I'm fine." Eddie Jordan, Jordan team principal, said he sympathised with Alesi but noticed the driver was philosophical about the crash. According to journalist David Tremayne of The Independent, the accident involving Alesi and Räikkönen prompted questions about the effectiveness of wheel tethers in the event of a car crash.

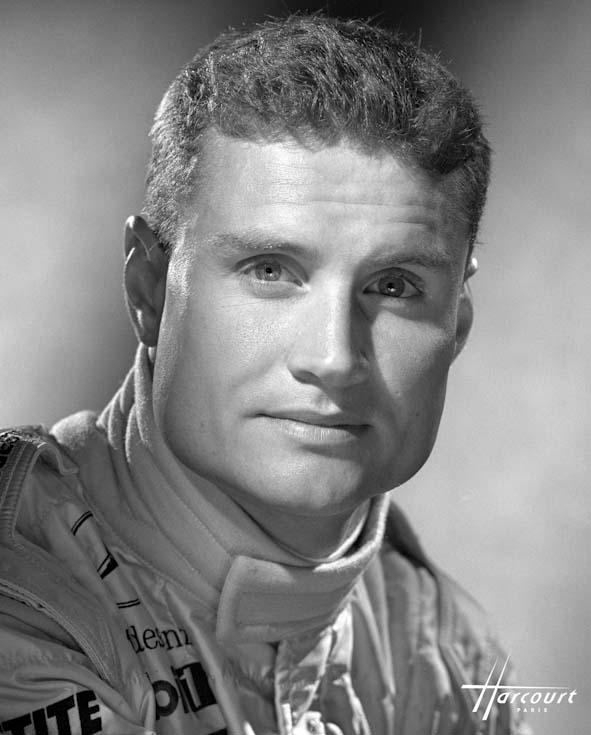
David Coulthard (pictured in 1999) finished in third place to end the season as runner-up in the World Drivers' Championship.

Häkkinen commented on his final race, "I want to thank everybody who I have worked with for the past nine years for all the effort they put into making my career so successful. I'm happy that David finished on the podium, and I must admit that by letting him past I wanted to give him something back for the occasions in the past when he has helped me." McLaren team principal Ron Dennis felt Häkkinen had much personal discipline and was hard-working to become a Grand Prix winner. Coulthard confessed that he would probably not fully appreciate Häkkinen as a teammate if that was no longer the case. However, he noted that Häkkinen had been his benchmark for measuring how well he performed, and he was unhappy that his teammate was going before he got the chance to beat him.

Ferrari honoured their 2001 season achievements in front of Ferrari fans at the Monza Circuit on 21 October. Following their duel during the race, Barrichello stated that he regarded Ralf Schumacher as "a bad loser," adding that he was ahead of the Williams driver at the final chicane and thought it unjust that he went straight. Ferrari technical director Ross Brawn acknowledged to taking a big risk by planning a three-stop strategy for Barrichello, believing he would be delayed behind the Williams cars, "The only way he was going to finish second in the Championship was to win the race so we chose an extreme strategy." Nevertheless, Ferrari sporting director Jean Todt praised Barrichello's performance in Japan, saying, "I wish to thank Rubens for the great contribution he has made to the team. He has finished third in the drivers' championship at the end of a faultless year."

Michael Schumacher finished the season with a season-record 123 points in the World Drivers' Championship, and the 10 points he gained for winning the Grand Prix helped him break Alain Prost's all-time record for most career points scored. Coulthard's third-place finish put him second in the championship with 65 points, with Barrichello third with 56. Ferrari won the World Constructors' Championship by 77 points over McLaren while Williams finished third. With BAR and Jordan not scoring any points, Sauber secured fourth place, their best-ever finish.

=== Race classification ===
Drivers who scored championship points are denoted in bold.

| Pos | No | Driver | Constructor | Tyre | Laps | Time/Retired | Grid | Points |
|---|---|---|---|---|---|---|---|---|
| 1 | 1 | (Germany) **Michael Schumacher** | **Ferrari** | B | 53 | 1:27:33.298 | 1 | 10 |
| 2 | 6 | (Colombia) **Juan Pablo Montoya** | **Williams-BMW** | M | 53 | +3.154 | 2 | 6 |
| 3 | 4 | (United Kingdom) **David Coulthard** | **McLaren-Mercedes** | B | 53 | +23.262 | 7 | 4 |
| 4 | 3 | (Finland) **Mika Häkkinen** | **McLaren-Mercedes** | B | 53 | +35.539 | 5 | 3 |
| 5 | 2 | (Brazil) **Rubens Barrichello** | **Ferrari** | B | 53 | +36.544 | 4 | 2 |
| 6 | 5 | (Germany) **Ralf Schumacher** | **Williams-BMW** | M | 53 | +37.122 | 3 | 1 |
| 7 | 8 | (United Kingdom) Jenson Button | Benetton-Renault | M | 53 | +1:37.102 | 9 | |
| 8 | 11 | (Italy) Jarno Trulli | Jordan-Honda | B | 52 | +1 lap | 8 | |
| 9 | 16 | (Germany) Nick Heidfeld | Sauber-Petronas | B | 52 | +1 lap | 10 | |
| 10 | 10 | (Canada) Jacques Villeneuve | BAR-Honda | B | 52 | +1 lap | 14 | |
| 11 | 21 | (Spain) Fernando Alonso | Minardi-European | M | 52 | +1 lap | 18 | |
| 12 | 22 | (Germany) Heinz-Harald Frentzen | Prost-Acer | M | 52 | +1 lap | 15 | |
| 13 | 9 | (France) Olivier Panis | BAR-Honda | B | 51 | +2 laps | 17 | |
| 14 | 15 | (Brazil) Enrique Bernoldi | Arrows-Asiatech | B | 51 | +2 laps | PL^{1} | |
| 15 | 14 | (Netherlands) Jos Verstappen | Arrows-Asiatech | B | 51 | +2 laps | 21 | |
| 16 | 20 | (Malaysia) Alex Yoong | Minardi-European | M | 50 | +3 laps | PL^{1} | |
| 17 | 7 | (Italy) Giancarlo Fisichella | Benetton-Renault | M | 47 | Gearbox | 6 | |
| Ret | 19 | (Spain) Pedro de la Rosa | Jaguar-Cosworth | M | 45 | Oil leak | 16 | |
| Ret | 23 | (Czech Republic) Tomáš Enge | Prost-Acer | M | 42 | Brakes | 23^{2} | |
| Ret | 18 | (United Kingdom) Eddie Irvine | Jaguar-Cosworth | M | 24 | Fuel rig | 13 | |
| Ret | 17 | (Finland) Kimi Räikkönen | Sauber-Petronas | B | 5 | Collision/suspension | 12 | |
| Ret | 12 | (France) Jean Alesi | Jordan-Honda | B | 5 | Collision | 11 | |

Notes

- **^1** – Enrique Bernoldi and Alex Yoong started the race from the pit lane.
- **^2** – Tomáš Enge started the race from the back of the grid (23rd position), although he started the formation lap from his 19th position.

== Final Championship standings ==
Drivers' Championship standings

| +/– | Pos | Driver | Points |
|---|---|---|---|
| | 1 | (Germany) Michael Schumacher* | 123 |
| | 2 | (United Kingdom) David Coulthard | 65 |
| | 3 | (Brazil) Rubens Barrichello | 56 |
| | 4 | (Germany) Ralf Schumacher | 49 |
| | 5 | (Finland) Mika Häkkinen | 37 |

Constructors' Championship standings

| +/– | Pos | Constructor | Points |
|---|---|---|---|
| | 1 | (Italy) Ferrari* | 179 |
| | 2 | (United Kingdom) McLaren-Mercedes | 102 |
| | 3 | (United Kingdom) Williams-BMW | 80 |
| | 4 | (Switzerland) Sauber-Petronas | 21 |
| | 5 | (Republic of Ireland) Jordan-Honda | 19 |
Sources:

- Note: Only the top five positions are included for both sets of standings.
- Bold text and an asterisk indicates the 2001 World Champions.

== Notes ==
| Previous race: 2001 United States Grand Prix | FIA Formula One World Championship; 2001 season | Next race: 2002 Australian Grand Prix |
| Previous race: 2000 Japanese Grand Prix | Japanese Grand Prix | Next race: 2002 Japanese Grand Prix |
