= Cuttin' Heads =

Studio album by John Mellencamp
- Released: October 16, 2001
- Recorded: July 2000 – June 2001
- Genre: Heartland rock
- Length: 40:02
- Label: Columbia
- Producer: John Mellencamp

John Mellencamp chronology
Rough Harvest (1999)	Cuttin' Heads (2001)	Trouble No More (2003)

Professional ratings
Aggregate scores
Source	Rating
Metacritic	73/100
Review scores
Source	Rating
AllMusic	4/5 stars
Billboard	favorable
Blender	4/5 stars
E! Online	B+
Entertainment Weekly	B+
Nude as the News	8/10
Q	4/5 stars
Rolling Stone	3.5/5 stars
USA Today	3.5/4 stars

Cuttin' Heads is the 17th album by American singer-songwriter and musician John Mellencamp, released on October 16, 2001. It was his second album for Columbia Records, and it peaked at No. 15 on the Billboard 200 in early November 2001. The album contains only one single, the India.Arie duet "Peaceful World".

== Background ==
"'Peaceful World' was extracted from a conversation with Pat Peterson, who's been singing backup in my touring band since 1981," Mellencamp explained to the Denver Post in an August 2001 feature. "She's my age, and I asked her, 'What's the one thing that's really disturbing to you?' There was no question about it – it's how this new rap music is really harmful to the black race. You have the new Uncle Tom, the guy wagging the $200,000 watch and saying, ... 'Gimme the money, man, look what I got that you ain't got ... I'll say whatever you want me to say, and when this (ends), I'll just go back to whatever I'm doing, and I don't care about the damage that I've done.' Meanwhile, white kids in suburbs who buy these records find it entertaining if not comical half the time. They have a really distorted view of what the black race is about. It's a very bad thing."

Chuck D of the rap group Public Enemy sang a verse on the album's title track, which addresses Mellencamp's annoyance and chagrin at the use of the "N" word in rap music. "They just had a rap seminar in New York, and Chuck got up and said, 'Hey, look, I just came back from the cornfields of Indiana, and Mellencamp said something in a song that you guys should have been saying about yourselves 10 years ago!,'"

Mellencamp told the Denver Post, "I'm just an observer here – I thought coming from me alone, it would be obtuse. But Chuck is the conscience of the whole black community. He was the only choice to do this song with me, because he's the only guy that never participated in it, always kept his integrity and his wits about him.

"Columbia Records died when they heard it. They don't want any problems because of this song. But they were very understanding – they just said, 'Why do you want to do this?' I said, 'Hey, man, I'm a ... folk singer. If I'm not going to have some issues here, that makes me a puppet.'"

Cuttin' Heads is also noteworthy for "Deep Blue Heart", a love song that Mellencamp recorded as a duet with country star Trisha Yearwood. "He played me this song," Yearwood told Country.com, "and he said, 'I kind of have an idea of like when Emmylou Harris sang on Bob Dylan's record, just kind of harmony all the way through.'"

Mellencamp said of "Deep Blue Heart" in a November 2001 interview with the Indianapolis Star: "When I wrote that song, I thought, 'Wow, this is kind of good for this type of song.' I like what it says, I like the imagery of it, and I like how it conveys a little bit of what everyone would like to feel."

Mellencamp picked Yearwood as his duet partner on "Deep Blue Heart" because of the rawness of her voice. "I suppose a lot of women could have sung that song," he told the Indianapolis Star. "But she has that nice, low register - kind of raspy. I guess it's sexy, but honest. It's not put-on sexy. It makes you feel that you're actually listening to a woman."

== Track listing ==
All songs written by John Mellencamp, except where noted.

1. "Cuttin' Heads" (Mellencamp, Ridenhour, Kyle Jason) – 5:03
2. "Peaceful World" – 4:05
3. "Deep Blue Heart" – 3:29
4. "Crazy Island" – 3:47
5. "Just Like You" – 4:04
6. "The Same Way I Do" – 3:20
7. "Women Seem" – 5:14
8. "Worn Out Nervous Condition" – 3:32
9. "Shy" – 3:25
10. "In Our Lives" – 4:03

Best Buy bonus disc

Initial copies of the album sold at Best Buy contained a bonus CD with two live recordings taken from Mellencamp's Good Samaritan Tour in August 2000.

1. "In My Time of Dying" (Traditional) – 2:27
2. "Hey Gib" (Traditional) – 3:28

== Personnel ==
- John Mellencamp – vocals, guitar
- Andy York – electric and acoustic guitars, mandolin, banjo, lap steel, bass, keyboards, percussion, backing vocals
- Steve Jordan – drums and percussion
- Willie Weeks – bass
- Miriam Sturm – violin, keyboards, percussion, backing vocals
- Jenn Cristy – flute, percussion, background vocals, piano, organ, violin
- Moe Z M.D. – organ, clavinet, drums, percussion, backing vocals
- Pat Peterson – background vocals
- Courtney "PeeWee" Kaiser – background vocals
- Mike Wanchic – guitar, backing vocals
- Dane Clark – drums, percussion
- John Gunnell – bass
- Kenny Childers – acoustic guitar, background vocals
- David Wierhake – accordion on "Peaceful World" and "In Our Lives"
- Chuck D – vocals on "Cuttin' Heads"
- India.Arie – vocals on "Peaceful World"
- Trisha Yearwood – vocals on "Deep Blue Heart"

== Charts ==
Album – Billboard (United States)

Year	Chart	Position
November 3, 2001	The Billboard 200	15
