= Objects in mirror are closer than they appear =

Safety warning on convex mirrors

Indian-specification vehicle's side-view mirror with the eponymous legend

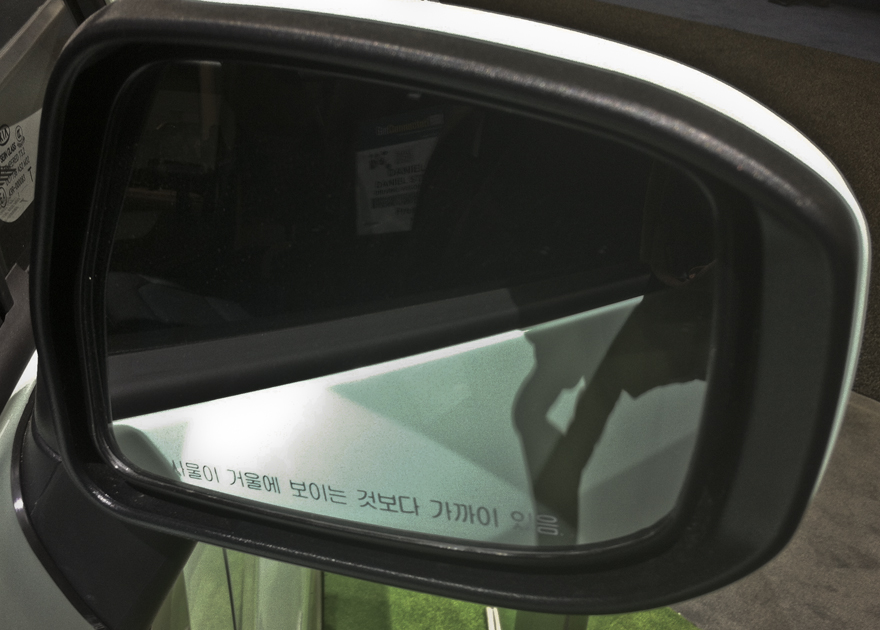
Wing mirror on a South Korean-specification vehicle. Legend in Korean reads "Objects in mirror are closer than they appear".

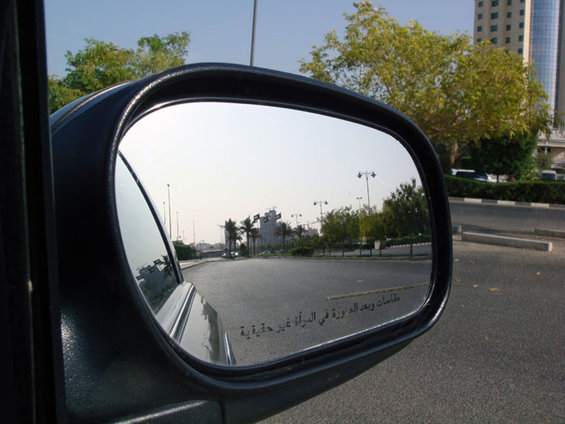
Arabic-language "Objects in mirror are closer than they appear" warning

The phrase "objects in (the) mirror are closer than they appear" is a safety warning that is required (Note: For example, in the US, Part 571 - Federal Motor Vehicle Safety Standards, Section 571.111 S5.4.2. Retrieved 8 March 2023. "Each convex mirror shall have permanently and indelibly marked at the lower edge of the mirror's reflective surface, in letters not less than 4.8 mm nor more than 6.4 mm high the words 'Objects in Mirror Are Closer Than They Appear.'") to be engraved on convex mirrors, often times on the passenger side, of motor vehicles in many places such as the United States, Canada, Nepal, India, and South Korea. It is present because while these mirrors' convexity gives them a useful field of view, it also makes objects appear smaller than in a plane mirror. Since smaller-appearing objects seem farther away than they actually are, a driver might make a maneuver such as a lane change assuming an adjacent vehicle is a safe distance behind, when in fact it is quite a bit closer. The warning serves as a reminder to the driver of this potential problem.

== In popular culture ==
Despite its origin as a utilitarian safety warning, the phrase has become a well known catch phrase that has been used for many other purposes. These include books, films (including non-English ones), (Note: Such as the Iranian film Objects in Mirror) cartoons, (Note: Probably the most famous instance in pop culture was showing the approach of a Tyrannosaurus rex in the 1993 film Jurassic Park, which was parodied in Toy Story 2. In the 1980s, Gary Larson, in his syndicated cartoon series The Far Side, published a cartoon showing a rear view mirror inscribed with the warning, filled with a giant eye.) songs, (Note: "Objects in the Rear View Mirror May Appear Closer Than They Are," a 1994 song written by Jim Steinman and performed by Meat Loaf.) music albums, (Note: For example, Objects in the Mirror Are Closer Than They Appear, a 1993 album by Nancy Moran.) and other contexts. (Note: "Subjects in the mirror are more far than they appear" the title of experimental visual project by Hungarian director/production designer Pater Sparrow.)

== See also ==
- Vehicle blind spot – Area around vehicle that cannot be directly observed by the driver while at the controls
- Blind spot monitor – Vehicle-based sensor device
- Parking sensor – Proximity sensor
- Pedestrian safety through vehicle design
- Rear-view mirror – Mirror in vehicles that allows the driver to see rearwards
- Road traffic safety – Methods and measures for reducing the risk of death and injury on roads
- Mind the gap – Warning to train passengers boarding and disembarking, another safety warning used at various London Underground stations that has also become a well-known catchphrase.
