= Confrontation Camp =

American rap rock group

- Origin: Long Island, New York, U.S.
- Genres: Rap rock
- Label: Artemis
- Members: Kyle Jason : Vocals, guitar, programming Professor Griff : Rap vocals programming Mistachuck (aka Chuck D) : Rap vocals Brian Hardgroove : Bass guitar Jafar Mahmud : Guitar; Wes Little : Drums; DJ Lord : Turntables

Confrontation Camp is an American rap rock group consisting of Kyle Jason and Public Enemy members Chuck D (under the name Mistachuck), Professor Griff and DJ Lord. The group's debut album, Objects in the Mirror Are Closer Than They Appear, was released on Artemis Records on July 25, 2000.

== Sources ==
- Inside Mista Chuck's Hard Rock Confrontation Camp, Rolling Stone (2000)
- Allmusic
- Chuck D's Confrontation Camp Leaves Warped Tour, MTV.com
