= Kyle Jason =

Kyle Jason is a singer, songwriter, musician and performer from Roosevelt, New York as well as the videographer for Public Enemy's productions. He was the host of The Kyle Jason Show on Air America Radio. The program was broadcast every Saturday night from 2004 until January 2006. He is famous for "the Martini Swing" and plays in various styles, from jazz to Rhythm and Blues. He released the CDs Generations (1997), on which Chuck D and Bootsy Collins appear, Revolution of the Cool (2005), which features the documentary "Coming From The Soul", People, People (2010), After Midnight and Something That Matters (both in 2011). He started his career opening for fellow Roosevelt native Eddie Murphy. He has appeared on Public Enemy's There's a Poison Goin' On (2004), Bootsy Collins's Fresh Outta 'P' University (1997), Confrontation Camp's Objects in the Mirror Are Closer Than They Appear (2000) and in the movies Bloom (2000), Lost Money (2001), Snitch in New York (2002), Dirty Shield (2003), God Fathers and Sons (2003), American Gangster (2007) and The Quiet Arrangement (2009).
