= DJ Lord =

American DJ and turntablist

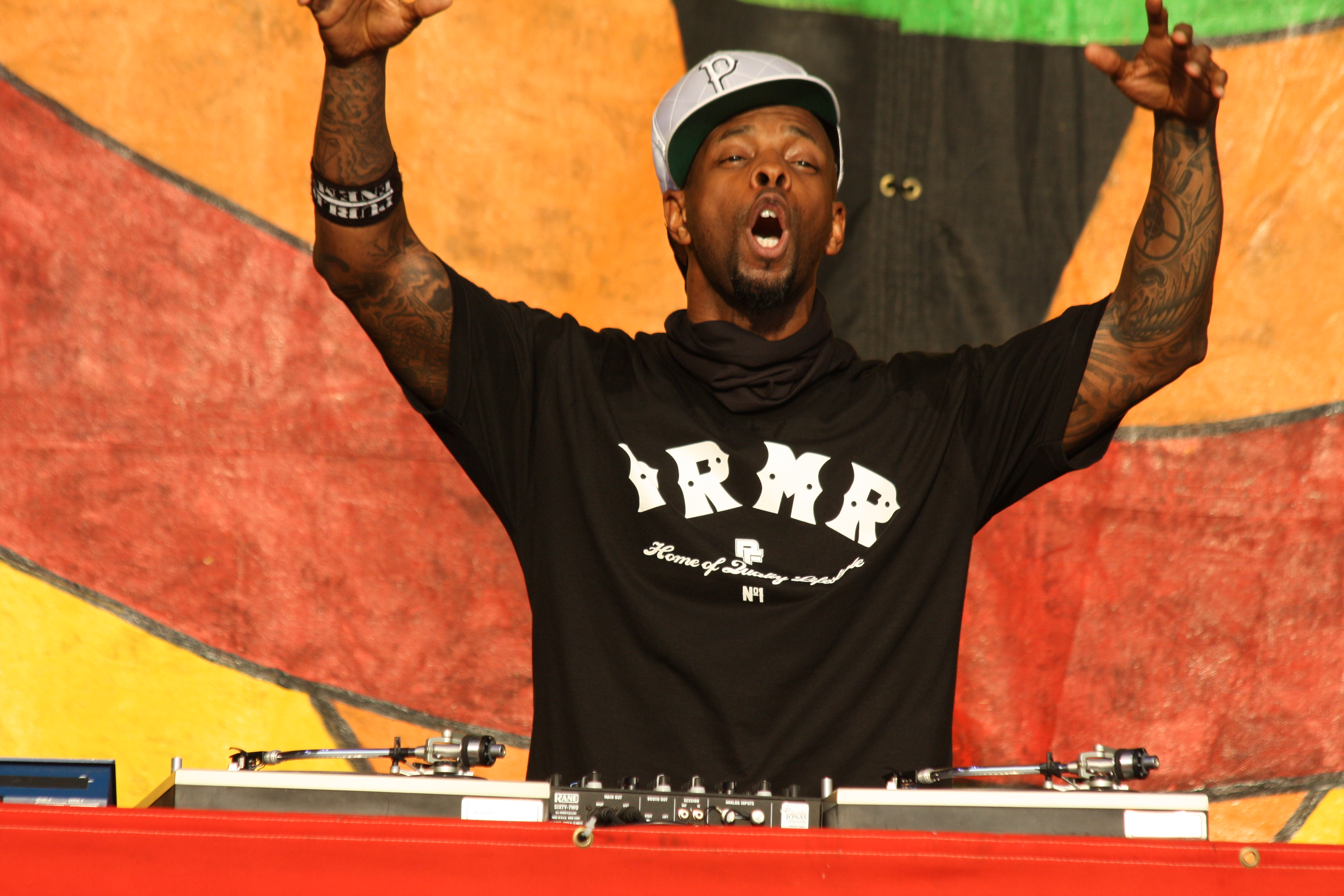
- DJ Lord performing with Public Enemy in 2014

Background information
- Also known as: DJ Lord; Mista Lord
- Born: Lord Aswod; March 11, 1975 (age 51); Savannah, Georgia, U.S.
- Genres: Hip hop; drum and bass
- Occupations: DJ; turntablism
- Years active: 1998–present
- Member of: Public Enemy; Cypress Hill; Confrontation Camp
- Formerly of: Prophets of Rage
- Website: www.djlord.co www.publicenemy.com

Lord Aswod (born March 11, 1975), known professionally as DJ Lord, is an American DJ and turntablist. In 1999, DJ Lord joined the hip hop group Public Enemy on its 40th World Tour replacing Terminator X. Soon after, DJ Lord had his own performance segment within the Public Enemy show. While hip hop has been at the foundation of his career, he also works in the drum and bass arena. His career and the art of turntablism is documented in the DVD, DJ Lord - The Turntablist Chronicles, released in 2004.

In addition to working with Public Enemy, DJ Lord tours solo as well as with Flavor Flav in his solo effort as well as with art exhibition Arts, Beats + Lyrics. He has also performed with rock band Confrontation Camp and TrillBass. In December 2014 he released his first solo album with 2MP (2 Much Posse) entitled “Eat The Rat” on Spit Digital.

DJ Lord was also a member of Prophets of Rage. He continues to tour and perform with Cypress Hill, a role he has held since at least 2019.

== Battle career highlights ==
- 2004 – DMC U.S. Finalist
- 2004 – DMC Cincinnati Regional Heat Champion
- 2004 – Numark/Guitar Center Southeast Champion
- 2004 – KoolMixx Atlanta Battle Champion
- 2003 – KoolMixx Atlanta Battle Champion
- 2003 – Breaklanta 3 Battle Champion
- 2002 – Breaklanta 1 Battle Champion
- 2002 – Pioneer/Promo Only CDJ1000 CD Turntable Champion
- 2001 – DMC U.S. Finalist
- 2001 – DMC Phoenix Arizona Regional Champion
- 2001 – Guitar Center/Stanton Southeast Battle Champion
- 2000 – Guitar Center/Vestax Southeast Battle Champion
- 2000 – KoolMixx Atlanta Battle Champion

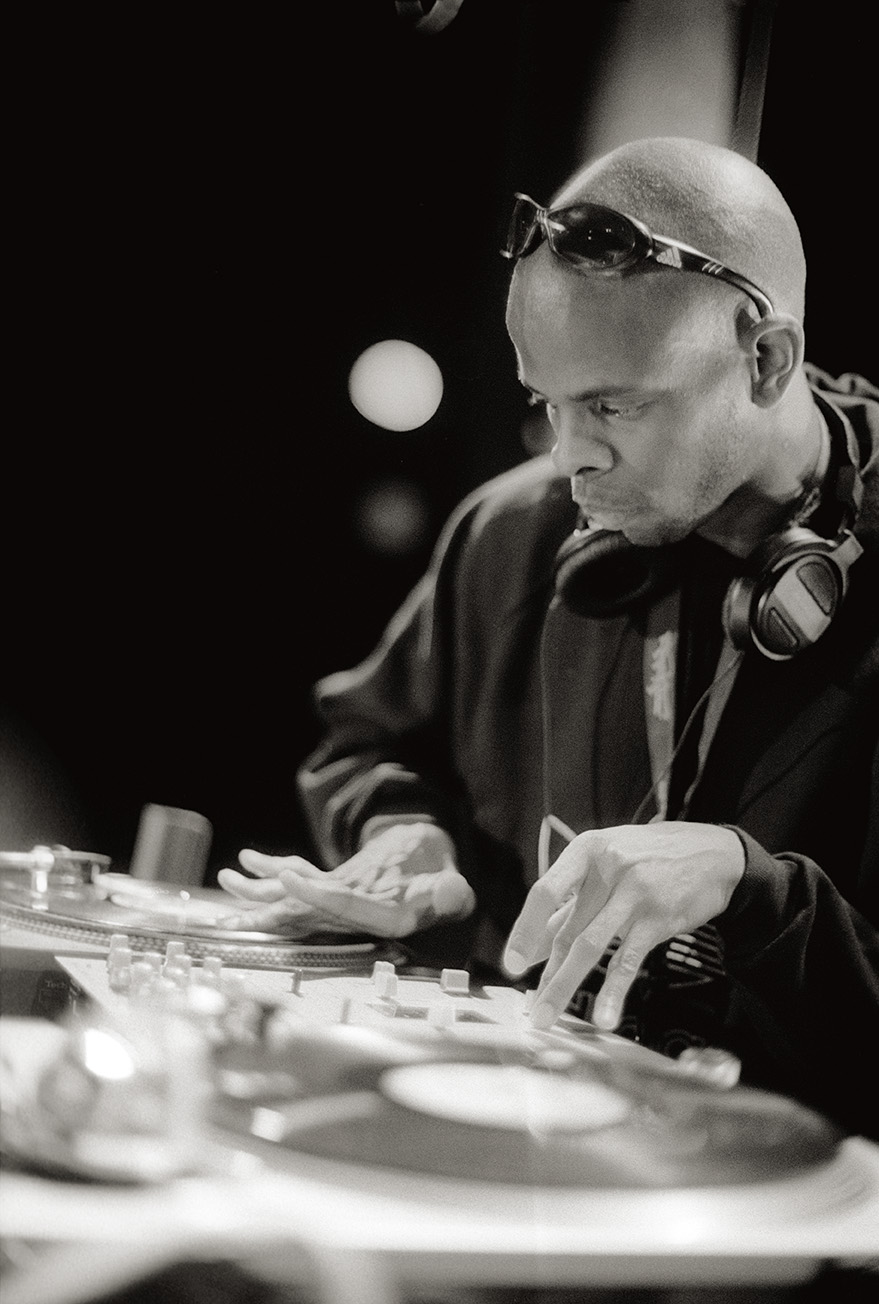
2000, Hamburg/Germany with PE
