= Nancy Moran =

American singer-songwriter

Nancy Moran (born Pittsburgh, Pennsylvania, United States) is an American folk-rock singer-songwriter, based in Nashville, Tennessee. In 1992, she was a finalist in the Kerrville Folk Festival New Folk Competition. Dirty Linen reportedly described her as having "a powerful and expressive voice that is stylish and stunning," and another reviewer wrote that she has "a voice .. both expressive and confident .. a joy to listen to." She has appeared on Americana music charts. She joined Four Bitchin' Babes in 2005. The group toured to promote the album, Diva Nation....Where Music, Laughter & Girlfriends Reign! (2009).

In addition to performing music, she also teaches songwriting and music business workshops for music organizations such as the Nashville Songwriters Association (NSAI) and TAXI. She co-created the audio recording The Songwriter's Survival Kit. Moran also provides music career coaching and consulting through her company, Azalea Music Group, in partnership with her husband, record producer, Fett.

== Discography ==
- A Little Off Balance (1991)
- Objects in Mirror Are Closer Than They Appear (1993)
- My Gallery (1997)
- Something Old Something New (2004)
