= Retrospective (Indigo Girls album) =

Compilation album by Indigo Girls
- Released: October 3, 2000
- Genre: Folk
- Length: 69:36
- Label: Epic

Indigo Girls chronology
Come on Now Social (1999)	Retrospective (2000)	Become You (2002)

Professional ratings
Review scores
Source	Rating
AllMusic	4/5 stars

Retrospective is a compilation of the Indigo Girls (Emily Saliers & Amy Ray) work from 1987 to 1999.

== Critical reception ==
William Ruhlmann of AllMusic writes, "It remains possible that the Indigo Girls will continue to score good, consistent sales, and the two new songs suggest that there's still creative fuel for this group to burn. But if they have crested, Retrospective confirms their status as one of the most accomplished recording units of their time."

Michael Hubbard of musicOMH writes, "Retrospective is an album which brings together many great moments from their years of non-hits".

== Track listing ==
No.	Title	Writer(s)	Original album	Length
1.	"Strange Fire"	Amy Ray	Strange Fire (1987)	5:29
2.	"Closer to Fine"	Emily Saliers	Indigo Girls (1989)	4:01
3.	"Kid Fears"	Ray	Indigo Girls	4:34
4.	"Watershed"	Saliers	Nomads Indians Saints (1990)	5:45
5.	"Three Hits"	Ray	Rites of Passage (1992)	3:09
6.	"Galileo"	Saliers	Rites of Passage	4:11
7.	"Ghost"	Saliers	Rites of Passage	5:15
8.	"Reunion"	Ray	Swamp Ophelia (1994)	3:26
9.	"Power of Two"	Saliers	Swamp Ophelia	5:21
10.	"Least Complicated"	Saliers	Swamp Ophelia	4:10
11.	"Shame on You"	Ray	Shaming of the Sun (1997)	4:01
12.	"Get Out the Map"	Saliers	Shaming of the Sun	3:24
13.	"Go"	Ray	Come On Now Social (1999)	4:03
14.	"Trouble"	Saliers	Come On Now Social	4:50
15.	"Devotion"	Ray	New song	3:33
16.	"Leaving"	Saliers	New song	4:24
Total length:				69:36

== Musicians ==
- Amy Ray – vocals (all), guitar (1–3, 16), acoustic guitar (4–11, 13, 15), mandolin (12, 14), electric guitar (11, 13), bouzouki (12), classical guitar (15)
- Emily Sailers – vocals (all), lead guitar (1, 5–6, 8), acoustic guitar (4–8, 10, 12), bouzouki (8, 11–12), rhythm (9), lead acoustic guitar (9), electric guitar (11, 13–14), banjo (11–12), background vocals (12), guitar (16)
- Paulinho da Costa – percussion (2–4)
- John Jennings – electric guitar (4, 7)
- Sara Lee – bass (4–12)
- Lisa Germano – fiddle (5–6), violin (8), mandolin (8–10), penny whistle (10)
- Jerry Marotta – drums (6–12, 15), percussion (6–7, 9–12, 15), piano (6), bongos (10), Taos drum (11), flintstone (12)
- Danny Thompson – acoustic bass (8–9)
- Michael Lorant – backing vocals (8, 10)
- John Painter – flugelhorn (9), accordion (10)
- John Reynolds – drums (13–14), percussion (14)
- Carol Isaacs – organ (13, 16), Moog (13), accordion (15)
- Joan Osborne – backing vocals (13, 14)
- Claire Kenny – bass (14–16)

=== Additional musicians ===
"Closer to Fine"

- Peter O'Toole – mandolin, background vocals
- Fiachna O'Braondin – tin whistle, background vocals
- Liam Ó Maonlaí – bodhran, background vocals
- Luka Bloom – background vocals

"Kid Fears"

- John Keane – 12 string electric guitar
- DeDe Vogt – bass
- Jay Dee Daugherty – drums
- Michael Stipe – additional vocals

"Watershed"

- Kenny Aronoff – drums
- Peter Holsapple – keyboards

"Three Hits"

- Budgie – drums & percussion
- Ronan Browne – uilleann pipes
- Dónal Lunny – bouzouki, bodhran

"Galileo"

- Talvin Singh – percussion

"Ghost"

- Simone Simonton – cymbals, sidestick
- Jai Winding – piano
- Michael Kamen – conducted and arranged strings

"Reunion"

- The Roches – backing vocals

"Power of Two"

- Bill Newton – chromatic harmonica
- Chuck Leavell – piano
- Sam "Shake" Anderson – backing vocals

"Least Complicated"

- Jo-El Sonnier – accordion

"Shame on You"

- Steve Earle – vocals, harmonica

"Get Out the Map"

- Dallas Austin, Quentin Bush, Jama Carter – backing vocals

"Go"

- Dawson Miller – percussion
- Clare Kenny – bass
- Caroline Dale – cello
- Meridel Le Sueur – spoken word written from I Was Marching

"Trouble"

- Malcolm Burn – beat box

"Leaving"

- Blair Cunningham – drums

== Production ==
- Producer: John Keane (1), Indigo Girls (11–16), John Reynolds (13–16), Peter Collins (5–10), Scott Litt (2–4)
- Package design: Kris Anderson-Barrett
- Engineer: Tim Oliver (15, 16)
- Liner Notes: Amy Ray, Emily Saliers, Susan Faludi
- Mastered by: Scott Hull (15, 16)
- Photography: Amy Ray, Gail Gellman, Giacomo Buonofina, Larry Ray, Lee Walker, Nelda Mays, Peter Buck, Roger Klein, Susan Alzmer

All track information and credits were taken from the CD liner notes.
