= 4.5: The Best of the Indigo Girls =

Greatest hits album by Indigo Girls
- Released: July 3, 1995
- Genre: Folk rock
- Length: 63:29
- Language: English
- Label: Epic
- Producer: Peter Collins; Scott Litt

Indigo Girls chronology
Swamp Ophelia (1994)	4.5: The Best of the Indigo Girls (1995)	1200 Curfews (1995)

4.5: The Best of the Indigo Girls is a 1995 greatest hits compilation from Epic Records for American folk rock duo Indigo Girls.

== Reception ==
The editorial staff of AllMusic Guide gave this compilation three out of five stars, with reviewer Chris Woodstra noting that the compilation "does the job of introducing the band to the foreign market, its lack of rarities and prohibitive import price make it unnecessary for the U.S."

== Track listing ==
1. "Joking" (Amy Ray, from Rites of Passage, 1992) – 3:34
2. "Hammer and a Nail" (Emily Saliers, from Nomads Indians Saints, 1990) – 3:51
3. "Kid Fears" (Ray, from Indigo Girls, 1989) – 4:35
4. "Galileo" (Saliers, from Rites of Passage, 1992) – 4:13
5. "Tried to Be True" (Ray, from Indigo Girls, 1989) – 3:00
6. "Power of Two" (Saliers, from Swamp Ophelia, 1994) – 5:23
7. "Pushing the Needle Too Far" (Ray, from Nomads Indians Saints, 1990) – 4:13
8. "Reunion" (Ray, from Swamp Ophelia, 1994) – 3:28
9. "Closer to Fine" (Saliers, from Indigo Girls, 1989) – 4:02
10. "Three Hits" (Ray, from Rites of Passage, 1992)3:11
11. "Least Complicated" (Saliers, from Swamp Ophelia, 1994) – 4:12
12. "Touch Me Fall" (Ray, from Swamp Ophelia, 1994) – 6:13
13. "Love's Recovery" (Saliers, from Indigo Girls, 1989) – 4:24
14. "Land of Canaan" (Ray, from Strange Fire, 1987) – 3:57
15. "Ghost" (Saliers, from Rites of Passage, 1992) – 5:14

== Personnel ==
"Joking"

- Amy Ray – acoustic guitar, hand claps, vocals
- Emily Saliers – acoustic guitar, hand claps, vocals
- Kenny Aronoff – drums, percussion
- Sara Lee – bass guitar
- David Leonard – mixing at Scream Studios in Studio City, Los Angeles, California, United States
- Scott Litt – engineering, production
- Pat McCarthy – recording at Bearsville Studios in Bearsville, New York, United States
- Benmont Tench – organ

"Hammer and Nail"

- Amy Ray – acoustic guitar, vocals
- Emily Saliers – acoustic guitar, vocals
- Mary Chapin Carpenter – vocals
- Paulinho da Costa – percussion
- Kenny Aronoff – drums, percussion
- Peter Holsapple – accordion
- Sara Lee – bass guitar
- Scott Litt – engineering, production
- Benmont Tench – accordion

"Kid Fears"

- Amy Ray – guitar, vocals
- Emily Saliers – guitar, vocals
- John Keane – 12-string guitar
- Scott Litt – engineering, production
- Michael Stipe – vocals
- Dede Vogt – bass guitar

"Galileo"

- Amy Ray – acoustic guitar, vocals
- Emily Saliers – acoustic and electric guitars, vocals
- Jackson Browne – backing vocals
- David Crosby – backing vocals
- Lisa Germano – fiddle
- Scott Litt – engineering, production
- Sara Lee – bass guitar
- David Leonard – mixing at Scream Studios in Studio City, Los Angeles, California, United States
- Jerry Marotta – drums, percussion, piano
- Pat McCarthy – recording at Bearsville Studios in Bearsville, New York, United States
- Martin McCarrick – accordion, cello
- Talvin Singh – percussion

"Tried to Be True"

- Amy Ray – guitar, vocals
- Emily Saliers – electric guitar, vocals
- Bill Berry – drums
- Peter Buck – electric guitar
- John Keane – shakers
- Scott Litt – engineering, production
- Mike Mills – bass

"Power of Two"

- Amy Ray – acoustic guitar, vocals
- Emily Saliers – acoustic guitar, vocals
- Samantha Anderson – backing vocals
- Peter Collins – production
- Marc Frigo – engineering assistance
- Lisa Germano – mandolin
- Chuck Leavell – piano
- Sara Lee – bass guitar
- David Leonard – engineering, mixing at Woodland Studios in Nashville, Tennessee, United States
- Jerry Marotta – drums, percussion
- Bill Newton – chromatic harmonica
- John Mark Painter – flugelhorn
- Danny Thompson – double bass

"Pushing the Needle Too Far"

- Amy Ray – acoustic guitar, vocals
- Emily Saliers – acoustic guitar, vocals
- Peter Holsapple – accordion
- Sara Lee – bass guitar
- Scott Litt – engineering, production
- Michael Lorrant – drums

"Reunion"

- Amy Ray – acoustic guitar, vocals
- Emily Saliers – acoustic guitar, bouzouki, vocals
- Peter Collins – production
- Lisa Germano – mandolin, violin
- Sara Lee – bass guitar
- David Leonard – engineering, mixing
- Michael Lorant and The Roches – backing vocals
- Jerry Marotta – drums
- Danny Thompson – double bass

"Closer to Fine"

- Amy Ray – guitar, vocals
- Emily Saliers – guitar, vocals
- Luka Bloom – backing vocals
- Paulinho da Costa – percussion
- Scott Litt – engineering, production
- Fiachna Ó Braonáin – tin whistle, backing vocals
- Liam Ó Maonlaí – bodhrán, backing vocals
- Peter O’Toole – mandolin, backing vocals

"Three Hits"

- Amy Ray – acoustic and electric guitars, vocals
- Emily Saliers – acoustic guitar, vocals
- Ronan Browne – uilleann pipes
- Budgie – drums, percussion
- Peter Collins – production
- Lisa Germano – fiddle
- Sara Lee – bass guitar
- David Leonard – mixing at Scream Studios in Studio City, Los Angeles, California, United States
- Dónal Lunny – bodhrán, bouzouki
- Pat McCarthy – engineering at Bearsville Studios in Bearsville, New York, United States

"Least Complicated"

- Amy Ray – acoustic guitar, vocals
- Emily Saliers – acoustic guitar, vocals
- David Leonard – engineering, mixing
- Peter Collins – production
- John Mark Painter – accordion
- Jo-El Sonnier – accordion
- Sara Lee – bass guitar
- Jerry Marotta – drums, percussion, bongos
- Lisa Germano – mandolin, tin whistle
- Michael Lorant – backing vocals

"Touch Me Fall"

- Amy Ray – electric gui:tar, vocals
- Emily Saliers – electric guitar, vocals
- David Leonard – engineering and mixing at Woodland Studios in Nashville, Tennessee, United States
- Peter Collins – production
- Jan Dykes – bass guitar
- James Hall – trumpet
- Sara Lee – bass guitar
- The Love Sponge Quartet – strings
  - David Davidson – violin
  - Anthony LaMarchina – cello
  - Christian Teal – violin
  - Kristin Wilkinson – viola
- Jerry Marotta – drums
- John Mark Painter – flugelhorn, string arrangement

"Love's Recovery"

- Amy Ray – guitar, vocals
- Emily Saliers – guitar, vocals
- Scott Litt – engineering, production
- Dede Vogt – bass guitar
- Jai Winding – piano

"Land of Canaan:

- Amy Ray – guitar, vocals
- Emily Saliers – guitar, vocals
- Paulinho da Costa – percussion
- Jay Dee Daugherty – drums
- John Keane – slide guitar
- Scott Litt – engineering, production
- Kasim Sulton – bass guitar

"Ghost"

- Amy Ray – acoustic guitar, vocals
- Emily Saliers – acoustic guitar, vocals
- Pat McCarthy – engineering at Bearsville Studios in Bearsville, New York, United States
- Peter Collins – production
- John Jennings – electric guitar
- Michael Kamen – conducting, string arrangement
- Sara Lee – bass guitar
- David Leonard – mixing at Scream Studios in Studio City, Los Angeles, California, United States
- Jerry Marotta – drums, percussion
- Simone Simonton – cymbals
- Jai Winding – piano

== See also ==
- List of 1995 albums
