= 1200 Curfews =

Live album by Indigo Girls
- Released: October 10, 1995
- Recorded: 1982; 1992–1995
- Genre: Folk rock
- Length: 144:40
- Label: Epic
- Producer: Indigo Girls and Russell Carter

Indigo Girls chronology
4.5: The Best of the Indigo Girls (1995)	1200 Curfews (1995)	Shaming of the Sun (1997)

Professional ratings
Review scores
Source	Rating
Allmusic	3.5/5 stars
Entertainment Weekly	A−
The Music Box	3/5 stars
Q	4/5 stars
Robert Christgau	(dud)
The Rolling Stone Album Guide	2/5 stars

1200 Curfews is a live album by the Indigo Girls, released in 1995.

Most of the recordings come from their 1994–95 tour to support the Swamp Ophelia album; seven are from the 1992–93 tour to support the album Rites of Passage.

The liner notes joke about the inclusion of the song "Land of Canaan". The song had already appeared (in different recordings each time) on their 1985 EP, their 1987 debut album Strange Fire, and their 1989 eponymous second album.

== Track listing ==
Tracks marked 'duo' feature only Amy Ray and Emily Saliers with no accompaniment.

Disc One
No.	Title	Writer(s)	Length
1.	"Joking" (April 18, 1993, The Cabaret Metro, Chicago, IL)	Amy Ray	4:28
2.	"Least Complicated" (April 26, 1995, The Tower Theater, Philadelphia, PA)	Emily Saliers	5:15
3.	"Thin Line" (May 27, 1995, Santa Monica Civic Center (dressing room), Santa Monica, CA)	Gerard McHugh	4:22
4.	"River" (Dec 21, 1994, Atlanta Symphony Hall, Atlanta, GA; ES only)	Joni Mitchell	3:53
5.	"Strange Fire" (April 18, 1993, The Cabaret Metro, Chicago, IL)	Ray	5:14
6.	"Power of Two" (Aug 23, 1994, Los Angeles, CA for Modern Rock Live; duo)	Saliers	5:17
7.	"Pushing the Needle Too Far" (Nov 27, 1992, The Fox Theatre, Atlanta, GA; duo)	Ray	4:21
8.	"Virginia Woolf" (May 30, 1995, Atwood Concert Hall, Alaska Center for the Performing Arts, Anchorage, AK)	Saliers	6:05
9.	"Jonas and Ezekial" (May 24, 1995, Hopi Civic Center, Hopi Indian Reservation, Kykotsmovi, AZ)	Ray	3:54
10.	"Tangled Up in Blue" (Aug 24, 1992, Great American Music Hall, San Francisco, CA)	Bob Dylan	8:06
11.	"World Falls" (May 30, 1995, Atwood Concert Hall, University of Alaska, Anchorage, AK)	Ray	3:53
12.	"Bury My Heart at Wounded Knee" (May 31, 1995, Atwood Concert Hall, Alaska Center for the Performing Arts, Anchorage, AK)	Buffy Sainte-Marie	5:09
13.	"Ghost" (Aug 13, 1994, Red Rocks, Morrison, CO (Radio simulcast); duo)	Saliers	6:04
14.	"Dead Man's Hill" (April 26, 1995, The Tower Theater, Philadelphia, PA)	Ray	5:34
Total length:			71:29

Disc Two
No.	Title	Writer(s)	Length
1.	"I Don't Wanna Know" (April 9, 1993, The Birchmere, Alexandria, VA)	Ray, Michelle Malone	3:47
2.	"Galileo" (Nov 21, 1994, Shepherd's Bush Empire, London, England)	Saliers	5:29
3.	"Down by the River" (April 18, 1993, The Cabaret Metro, Chicago, IL)	Neil Young	9:44
4.	"Love's Recovery" (Dec 21, 1994, Atlanta Symphony Hall, Atlanta, GA)	Saliers	5:03
5.	"Land of Canaan" (April 18, 1993, The Cabaret Metro, Chicago, IL; duo)	Ray	4:26
6.	"Mystery" (May 30, 1995, Atwood Concert Hall, University of Alaska, Anchorage, AK)	Saliers	4:49
7.	"This Train Revised" (May 13, 1995, Walker Theater, Winnipeg, Manitoba for CBC Radio)	Ray	6:40
8.	"Back Together Again" (1982, Amy Ray's basement; duo)	Saliers	2:04
9.	"Language or the Kiss" (Nov 21, 1994, Shepherd's Bush Empire, London, England)	Saliers	5:44
10.	"Chickenman" (Oct 13, 1994, A.J. Palumbo Center, Pittsburgh, PA)	Ray	7:28
11.	"Midnight Train to Georgia" (April 26, 1995, The Tower Theater, Philadelphia, PA)	Jim Weatherly	5:18
12.	"Closer to Fine" (Dec 21, 1994, Atlanta Symphony Hall, Atlanta, GA)	Saliers	4:48
13.	"Bury My Heart at Wounded Knee" (Studio version)	Buffy Sainte-Marie	5:14
14.	"Go/Touch Me Fall" (Hidden Track, unknown date; Amy Ray only)	Ray	2:41
Total length:			73:11

== Personnel ==
=== Lead vocals ===
- Amy Ray and Emily Saliers sing lead vocal on their respective compositions; the other sings harmony and/or support vocals.
- Amy Ray sings lead on 1:3, 1:12, 2:3 and 2:13 and not at all on 1:4 and 2:11.
- Emily Saliers sings lead on 2:11 with accompaniment from Gail Ann Dorsey and Jimmy Descant and the intro to 1:12 and 2:13. She sings solo on 1:4 and does not sing on 2:14.
- They share lead vocals on 1:10 though Emily sings first.
- Jerry Marotta sings lead on the third verse of 1:12.

=== Musicians ===
- Amy Ray - vocals, acoustic rhythm guitar, electric guitar (1:12, 2:11, 2:13), melodica (1:14)
- Emily Saliers - vocals, acoustic rhythm & lead guitar, electric guitar (1:12, 2:13), dobro (2:7)
- Sara Lee - bass (except 2:10, 2:12 and duo tracks), penny whistle (2:12)
- Jerry Marotta - drums (all except 2:4, 2:10 and duo tracks), saxophone (2:4), backing vocals (1:14, 2:11, 2:13)
- Scarlet Rivera - violin (1:5, 1:10, 2:1, 2:3)
- Jane Scarpantoni - cello (1:3, 1:5, 1:8–12, 2:3, 2:6–7, 2:11, 2:13), penny whistle (1:2)
- Michelle Malone - harmony vocals (2:1, 2:3), mandolin (2:1)
- Gail Ann Dorsey and Jimmy Descant - guest vocals (2:11)
- Sandy Garfinkle - harmonica (2:10)
- Michael Lorant - tambourine (2:10)
- Sheila Doyle - violin (2:12)
- Dede Vogt and Gerard McHugh - backing vocals (2:12)
- Russell Carter - backing vocals (2:13)
