= Holly Happy Days =

Studio album by Indigo Girls
- Released: October 12, 2010
- Recorded: 2010
- Genre: Folk rock
- Language: English
- Label: Vanguard
- Producer: Peter Collins

Indigo Girls chronology
Poseidon and the Bitter Bug (2009)	Holly Happy Days (2010)	Beauty Queen Sister (2011)

Singles from Holly Happy Days
- 1. "It Really Is (A Wonderful Life)"

Professional ratings
Review scores
Source	Rating
Allmusic	link
The Independent	(favorable) link
The Music Box	link
PopMatters	link

Holly Happy Days is the 12th studio album and first holiday album by Indigo Girls, released on October 12, 2010 by Vanguard Records. It is their third album on the IGR/Vanguard imprint.

The album contains nine standards and three originals. Their arrangements are mostly acoustic, with bluegrass music influence. The Indigo Girls chose songs from several holiday traditions, such as Woody Guthrie's Hanukkah track "Happy Joyous Hanukkah," and traditional Christmas hymns like "Angels We Have Heard on High"—arranged for guitar and mandolin in what the group called a Baroque-inspired style. Other tracks, like "Your Holiday Song," were written to include all faiths.

== Critical reception ==
The album was praised by reviewers for outlets including PopMatters, The Independent, and All Music Guide, which called the album "an enjoyable, somewhat offbeat, and fresh take on the holiday album."

== Track listing ==
1. "I Feel the Christmas Spirit" (Joe Isaacs)
2. "It Really Is (A Wonderful Life)" (Chely Wright)
3. "O Holy Night" (John S. Dwight)
4. "Your Holiday Song" (Emily Saliers)
5. "I'll Be Home for Christmas" (Buck Ram, Kim Gannon, Walter Kent)
6. "Mistletoe" (Amy Ray)
7. "Peace Child" (Shirley Murray/Bernadette Farrell)
8. "The Wonder Song" (Amy Ray)
9. "In the Bleak Midwinter" (Traditional)
10. "Happy Joyous Hanukkah" (Woody Guthrie)
11. "Angels We Have Heard on High" (Traditional)
12. "There's Still My Joy" (Beth Nielsen Chapman, Melissa Manchester, Matt Rollings)

== Personnel ==
Indigo Girls

- Amy Ray – vocals, acoustic and electric guitar, mandolin
- Emily Saliers – vocals, acoustic guitar, nylon string acoustic guitar, ukulele

Additional musicians

- Luke Bulla – fiddle, mandolin, rhythm acoustic guitar
- Jim Brock – percussion, finger cymbals
- Alison Brown – banjo, piccolo banjo
- Brandi Carlile – guest vocals
- Victor Krauss – bass
- Mary Gauthier – guest vocals
- Janis Ian – guest vocals
- Carol Isaacs – accordion, piano, harmonium
- Lloyd Maines – pedal steel and dobro
- John Painter – electric guitar
- Don Saliers – piano
- Julie Wolf – guest vocals and additional vocal arrangement

Production

- Peter Collins – production
- Denise Plumb – art design
- Trina Shoemaker – mixing
