= Live with the University of Colorado Symphony Orchestra =

Live album by Indigo Girls and University of Colorado Symphony Orchestra
- Released: June 22, 2018
- Recorded: April 5, 2017
- Venue: Macky Auditorium, University of Colorado, Boulder, Colorado, United States
- Genre: Folk rock
- Length: 104:06
- Label: Rounder
- Producer: Indigo Girls; Trina Shoemaker

Indigo Girls and University of Colorado Symphony Orchestra chronology
One Lost Day (2015)	Live with the University of Colorado Symphony Orchestra (2018)	Look Long (2020)

Live with the University of Colorado Symphony Orchestra is a 2018 live album by Indigo Girls and the University of Colorado Symphony Orchestra. The folk duo began experimenting with more complicated arrangements of their existing catalogue in 2012 and were invited to record with the orchestra in 2017.

== Critical reception ==
Thom Jurek of AllMusic gave the album a positive review, praising it for being "not only unpolished, it's downright raw, crackling"; the editorial staff of the site gave it 3.5 out of five stars. Kelly McCartney of Folk Alley also gave a positive review, finishing, "it an absolute exception to the rule of live records rarely capturing the magic in a room. Magic was, indeed, captured." Hal Horowitz of Creative Loafing gave the release four out of five stars, with the verdict "The Indigo Girls revisit, refresh, and revive their catalog by challenging their fans to join them in breaking new ground".

== Track listing ==
1. "Woodsong" – 4:33
2. "Sugar Tongue" – 3:46
3. "Able to Sing" – 4:24
4. "Compromise" – 3:10
5. "Virginia Woolf" – 5:35
6. "Happy in the Sorrow Key" – 2:57
7. "Power of Two" – 5:44
8. "Yoke" – 5:02
9. "Love of Our Lives" – 3:55
10. "World Falls" – 3:51
11. "Galileo" – 4:56
12. "Chickenman" – 7:45
13. "Fugitive" – 5:17
14. "Come a Long Way" – 4:02
15. "War Rugs" – 3:50
16. "Mystery" – 4:30
17. "Damo" – 4:49
18. "Come On Home" – 5:04
19. "Kid Fears" – 4:38
20. "Ghost" – 6:09
21. "Go" – 4:10
22. "Closer to Fine" – 5:59

== Personnel ==
Indigo Girls

- Amy Ray – guitar, vocals
- Emily Saliers – guitar, vocals

University of Colorado Symphony Orchestra

- Jenna Allen – percussion
- Priscilla Arasaki – violin
- Brett Armstrong – double bass
- Roberto Arundale – cello
- Dante Ascarrunz – double bass
- Tyler Bentley – trombone
- Ben Bresler – percussion
- Magee Capsouto – violin
- Jessica Chen – violin
- Michelle Chen – bassoon
- Dakota Cotugno – cello
- Kamila Dotta – cello
- Jacob Eichhorn – clarinet
- Sarah Elert – violin
- Jessica Erbe – trumpet
- Matthew Farquharson – violin
- Ida Findiku – violin
- Jesse Fischer – double bass
- Joey Fischer – viola
- Ryan Foley – violin
- Jason Friedman – horn
- Jonathan Galle – violin
- Charlie Goodman – trombone
- Leanne Hampton – flute
- Grace Harper – violin
- Eric Haugen – cello
- Kathryn Hendrickson – flute
- Lindey Hoak – violin
- Conner Hollingsworth – double bass
- Esther Hou – violin
- Megan Hurley – horn
- Ryan Jacobsen – violin
- Parker James – timpani
- Aaron Jensen – trumpet
- Avery Johnson – cello
- Evan Johnson – trombone
- Andrew Keeve – viola
- David Leech – clarinet
- José León – trombone
- Gary Lewis – conductor
- Dragana Loncar – viola
- Charles Lovell – percussion
- Lea Mattson – violin
- Breana McCullough – viola
- Jordan Miller – horn
- David Nester – bassoon
- Codi Ng – viola
- Brandon Norton – trumpet
- Alberto Ortega – percussion
- Ava Pacheco – violin
- Elizabeth Potter – violin
- Jordan Pyle – oboe
- Cort Roberts – horn
- Crystal Schneckenburger – violin
- Cameron Slaugh – cello
- Will Spengler – cello
- Alice Sprinkle – viola
- Allyson Stibbards – viola
- Caitlin Stokes – violin
- Michiko Theurer – violin
- Karen Van Acker – violin
- Tracy Viator – violin
- Kristin Weber – oboe
- Sophia Wonneberger – viola
- Tom Yaron – violin
- Stephanie Yu – violin

Technical personnel

- Evan Carter – photography
- Mark Chalecki – mastering
- Tom Heinisch – engineering
- Ben Holst – engineering
- Aron Michalski – crew
- Denise Plumb – package design
- Mike Rose – crew, engineering
- Trina Shoemaker – mixing, production
- Blair Woods – crew
