= Despite Our Differences =

Studio album by Indigo Girls
- Released: September 19, 2006
- Recorded: 2006
- Genre: Folk rock
- Length: 47:47
- Label: Hollywood
- Producer: Mitchell Froom

Indigo Girls chronology
All That We Let In (2004)	Despite Our Differences (2006)	Poseidon and the Bitter Bug (2009)

Singles from Despite Our Differences
- 1. "Little Perennials"; 2. "Pendulum Swinger"/"I Believe in Love"; 3. "Rock and Roll Heaven's Gate"; 4. "Last Tears"

Despite Our Differences is the tenth studio album by the Indigo Girls, released in 2006. The title is drawn from third track, "I Believe in Love" (I still believe despite our differences that what we have's enough/And I believe in you and I believe in love).

== Reception ==
Professional ratings
Aggregate scores
Source	Rating
Metacritic	(75/100)
Review scores
Source	Rating
About.com	4/5 stars
Allmusic	4/5 stars
Hot Press	(4/5)
The Music Box	4/5 stars
Now	3/5 stars
Paste	(7/10)
Q	3/5 stars
Slant Magazine	3.5/5 stars

The album has a score of 75 out of 100 from Metacritic based on "generally favorable reviews". John Metzger from The Music Box described Despite Our Differences as "the most infectious, pop-infused set that the duo ever has managed to concoct. In fact, its melodies, harmonies, and arrangements are so ingratiating that the album carries the weight of an instant classic." Thom Jurek from Allmusic said it was "part of an emotional journey as complete as can be. More relevant than anyone dared expect. It's accessible and moving and true. It's their own brand of rock & roll, hewn from over the years, that bears a signature that is now indelible."

== Track listing ==
1. "Pendulum Swinger" (Emily Saliers) – 3:40
2. "Little Perennials" (Amy Ray) – 2:50
3. "I Believe in Love" (Saliers) – 3:40
4. "Three County Highway" (Ray) – 3:44
5. "Run" (Saliers) – 4:02
6. "Rock and Roll Heaven's Gate" (Ray) – 3:14
7. "Lay My Head Down" (Saliers) – 4:20
8. "Money Made You Mean" (Ray) – 2:24
9. "Fly Away" (Saliers) – 3:20
10. "Dirt and Dead Ends" (Ray) – 5:26
11. "All the Way" (Saliers) – 3:45
12. "They Won't Have Me" (Ray) – 3:08
13. "Last Tears" (Saliers) – 4:14

== Personnel ==
Indigo Girls

- Amy Ray – acoustic guitar, harmonica, mandolin, electric guitar, vocals
- Emily Saliers – acoustic guitar, mandolin, electric guitar, ukulele, vocals, slide guitar

Other musicians

- Brandi Carlile – harmony vocals on "Last Tears"
- Matt Chamberlain – drums
- Mitchell Froom – keyboards
- Ruby Froom – clapping
- Carol Isaacs – organ, piano
- Clare Kenny – bass
- Greg Leisz – pedal steel
- Pink – vocals on "Rock and Roll Heaven's Gate"

Others

- David Boucher – engineer, mixing
- Jeremy Cowart – photography
- Sara Cumings – design
- Mitchell Froom – producer, engineer
- Jeri Heiden – art direction
- Bob Ludwig – mastering
- Geoffrey Weiss – A&R

== Chart performance ==
The album opened at #44 on the Billboard charts.
