= Poseidon and the Bitter Bug =

Studio album by Indigo Girls
- Released: March 24, 2009
- Recorded: 2008
- Genre: Folk rock
- Language: English
- Label: Vanguard
- Producer: Mitchell Froom

Indigo Girls chronology
Despite Our Differences (2006)	Poseidon and the Bitter Bug (2009)	Holly Happy Days (2010)

Singles from Poseidon and the Bitter Bug
- 1. "What Are You Like" Released: 2009; 2. "Love of Our Lives" Released: 2009

Professional ratings
Aggregate scores
Source	Rating
Metacritic	76/100
Review scores
Source	Rating
About.com	4/5 stars
Allmusic	4/5 stars
The Austin Chronicle	3/5 stars
BBC Music	(positive)
Billboard	(favorable)
Blurt	7/10 stars
The Boston Globe	(positive)
Consequence of Sound	3.5/5 stars
Metromix Atlanta	4/5 stars
The Music Box	3/5 stars
Prefix Magazine	(7.5/10)

Poseidon and the Bitter Bug is the 11th studio album by Indigo Girls, released on March 24, 2009 by Vanguard Records. The title is drawn from lines in tracks "Fleet of Hope" and "Second Time Around" – "You're all washed up when Poseidon has his day" and "I've been bitten by the bitter bug."

As of 2010 album has sold 70,000 copies in US.

== Track listing ==
1. "Digging for Your Dream" (Emily Saliers) – 3:57
2. "Sugar Tongue" (Amy Ray) – 3:37
3. "Love of Our Lives" (Saliers) – 3:51
4. "Driver Education" (Ray) – 2:18
5. "I'll Change" (Saliers) – 3:23
6. "Second Time Around" (Ray) – 4:12
7. "What Are You Like?" (Saliers) – 2:51
8. "Ghost of the Gang" (Ray) – 3:17
9. "Fleet of Hope" (Saliers) – 4:27
10. "True Romantic" (Ray) – 4:11

Deluxe Version bonus tracks

11. "Ghost of the Gang" (Acoustic Version) – 3:10
12. "I'll Change" (Acoustic Version) – 3:58
13. "Sugar Tongue" (Acoustic Version) – 3:47
14. "Love of Our Lives" (Acoustic Version) – 3:46
15. "Salty South" (Ray) – 4:17
16. "Digging for Your Dream" (Acoustic Version) – 3:22
17. "Second Time Around" (Acoustic Version) – 4:43
18. "What Are You Like?" (Acoustic Version) – 2:50
19. "Driver Education" (Acoustic Version) – 2:21
20. "Fleet of Hope" (Acoustic Version) – 4:31
21. "True Romantic" (Acoustic Version) – 3:56

== Personnel ==
Indigo Girls

- Amy Ray – Vocals, acoustic guitar, electric guitar, mandolin, harmonica
- Emily Saliers – Vocals, acoustic guitar, electric guitar

Additional personnel

- David Boucher – engineering
- Alison Brown – banjo
- Matt Chamberlain – drums, percussion, programming
- Mitchell Froom – keyboards, production
- Clare Kenny – bass guitar
- Missy Higgins – background vocals on "Digging for Your Dream" and "True Romantic"
