= Rarities (Indigo Girls album) =

Compilation album by Indigo Girls
- Released: June 14, 2005
- Recorded: 1986–2005
- Genre: Folk
- Length: 75:25
- Label: Epic

Rarities is a compilation album by Indigo Girls. It was released in 2005. It contains studio, demo, and live tracks (both original and cover versions of songs), many of which had previously been released on other compilation and soundtrack albums.

The vocals on most of the songs are performed entirely by the Indigo Girls; two songs feature vocal contributions from Michael Stipe ("I'll Give You My Skin") and Ani DiFranco ("Ramblin' Round").

== Track listing ==
No.	Title	Writer(s)	Length
1.	"Clampdown"	Joe Strummer, Mick Jones	3:17
2.	"I Don't Want to Talk About It"	Danny Whitten	3:36
3.	"Mona Lisas and Mad Hatters" (live)	Elton John, Bernie Taupin	3:27
4.	"Let Me Go Easy" (live)	Amy Ray	2:59
5.	"Winthrop"	Emily Saliers	4:18
6.	"Free of Hope"	Vic Chesnutt	5:44
7.	"Shed Your Skin" (Tom Morello remix)	Ray	4:25
8.	"Never Stop" (1986 EP version)	Saliers	2:27
9.	"Ghost" (demo)	Saliers	5:10
10.	"Uncle John's Band"	Jerry Garcia, Robert Hunter	4:50
11.	"I'll Give You My Skin"	Saliers, Ray, Michael Stipe	3:34
12.	"Free in You" (Dave Cooley remix)	Saliers	3:35
13.	"Point Hope"	Ray	6:52
14.	"Ramblin' Round" (live)	Woody Guthrie, Lead Belly, John Lomax	3:19
15.	"Cold as Ice" (live)	Ray	3:59
16.	"Walk Your Valley" (live)	Saliers	3:41
17.	"It Won't Take Long"	Ferron	7:41
18.	"Finlandia" (live)	Jean Sibelius	2:31

== Personnel ==
Indigo Girls

- Amy Ray – lead vocals, guitars
- Emily Saliers – lead vocals, guitars

Additional personnel

- Ani DiFranco – lead vocals
- Michael Stipe – backing vocals on "I'll Give You My Skin"

== Charts ==
Sales chart performance for Rarities
Year	Chart	Position
2005	The Billboard 200	159
