= One Lost Day =

Studio album by Indigo Girls
- Released: June 2, 2015
- Genre: Folk rock
- Length: 52:00
- Label: IG Recordings / Vanguard Records
- Producer: Jordan Brooke Hamlin

Indigo Girls chronology
Beauty Queen Sister (2011)	One Lost Day (2015)	Live with the University of Colorado Symphony Orchestra (2018)

Singles from One Lost Day
- 1. "Happy in the Sorrow Key"

Professional ratings
Aggregate scores
Source	Rating
Metacritic	(84/100)
Review scores
Source	Rating
Allmusic	4/5 stars
American Songwriter	3.5/5 stars
Paste	(9.0/10)

One Lost Day is the 14th studio album by Indigo Girls, released on June 2, 2015, on IG Recordings/Vanguard Records. It was recorded at various studios in Nashville. The title One Lost Day comes from the lyrics of "Alberta."

== Track listing ==
Odd-numbered tracks written by Emily Saliers; even-numbered tracks written by Amy Ray

1. "Elizabeth" – 3:37
2. "Happy in the Sorrow Key" – 2:58
3. "Southern California Is Your Girlfriend" – 4:20
4. "Texas Was Clean" – 4:11
5. "Alberta" – 3:05
6. "Olympia Inn" – 4:15
7. "If I Don't Leave Here Now" – 3:36
8. "Spread the Pain Around" – 4:07
9. "Learned It on Me" – 4:12
10. "The Rise of the Black Messiah" – 4:21
11. "Findlay, Ohio 1968" – 6:15
12. "Fishtails" – 3:31
13. "Come a Long Way" – 3:56

== Personnel ==
Indigo Girls

- Amy Ray – vocals (1–6, 8–13), electric guitar (1–3, 6, 9, 12), octave mando-guitar (3, 5), acoustic guitar (4, 13), mandolin (8, 10)
- Emily Saliers – vocals (1–13), acoustic guitar (1–9, 11, 13), dulcimer (1), electric guitar (10), banjo (12)

Additional musicians

- Brady Blade – drums (1, 4, 8, 10)
- Butterfly Boucher – bass (3, 11)
- Don Chaffer – cello (11)
- Chris Donohue – bass (4)
- Jordan Brooke Hamlin – clarinet (2, 11), French horn (2, 5), trumpet (2, 12), piano (3–5, 11, 12), electric guitar (3, 4, 9, 12, 13), octave mando-guitar (3, 6), programming (3), archtop guitar (4), organ (4, 6), dulcimer (5), percussion (5), bass (7), baritone guitar (8), banjo (8) pedal steel guitar (8, 12), drums (8, 13), noises (8, 11), synthesizer (9)
- Lyris Hung – violin (2, 5, 8, 10, 11, 13)
- Fred Eltringham – drums (3, 11, 13)
- Carol Isaacs – piano (1, 3, 7, 10, 12, 13), organ (1, 10, 11, 13), accordion (8, 11)
- Brian Joseph – drums (9)
- Jaron Pearlman – drums (2–6, 8, 9, 11, 12), tambourine (2)
- Lex Price – bass (1, 8, 10, 12), bouzouki (8)
- Benjamin Ryan Williams (B.E.N) – bass (2, 5, 6, 9)

Additional singers

- Lucy Wainwright Roche (8)
- Jordan Brooke Hamlin (3)

Production

- Jordan Brooke Hamlin – Producer
- Don Chaffer – Engineer
