= Beauty Queen Sister =

Studio album by Indigo Girls
- Released: October 4, 2011
- Recorded: 2011
- Genre: Folk rock
- Length: 50:08
- Label: Vanguard
- Producers: Peter Collins, John Reynolds

Indigo Girls chronology
Holly Happy Days (2010)	Beauty Queen Sister (2011)	One Lost Day (2015)

Singles from Beauty Queen Sister
- 1. "Making Promises"; 2. "We Get to Feel It All"

Professional ratings
Aggregate scores
Source	Rating
Metacritic	(63/100)
Review scores
Source	Rating
About.com	4/5 stars
Allmusic	3.5/5 stars
American Songwriter	3.5/5 stars
The A.V. Club	C+
The Independent	4/5 stars
Paste	(6.6/10)
Uncut	2/5 stars
USA Today	3/4 stars

Beauty Queen Sister is the 13th studio album by Indigo Girls, released on October 4, 2011, on Vanguard Records.

== Track listing ==
Tracks marked (A) by Amy Ray; tracks marked (E) by Emily Saliers.

1. "Share the Moon" (A) – 3:34
2. "John" (E) – 4:22
3. "Beauty Queen Sister" (A) – 3:11
4. "We Get to Feel It All" (E) – 3:32
5. "War Rugs" (A) – 3:23
6. "Gone" (Emily Saliers / Annie Roboff) – 3:02
7. "Mariner Moonlighting" (A) – 3:36
8. "Birthday Song" (E) – 4:19
9. "Feed and Water the Horses" (E) – 4:30
10. "Making Promises" (A) – 3:19
11. "Damo" (A) – 4:07
12. "Able to Sing" (E) – 4:02
13. "Yoke" (A) – 5:09

== Personnel ==
Indigo Girls

- Amy Ray – Vocals, songwriting, electric guitar (1–5, 7, 8, 13), acoustic guitar (6, 10, 12), electric mandolin (9), mandolin (11)
- Emily Saliers – Vocals, songwriting, ukulele (1), acoustic guitar (2, 4, 6, 8–12), electric guitar (3), slide guitar (6), classical guitar (7)

Additional Musicians

- Carol Isaacs – Wurlitzer (1, 4, 12), Hammond B3 (1, 2), vibes (1, 4, 5, 7–9, 13), piano (3, 6–9), accordion (10, 13)
- Brady Blade – drums (1–4, 6, 9, 10, 12), loop (2)
- Jim Brock – percussion (1–10, 12, 13), loop (2), drums (5, 7, 8, 13)
- Stuart Mathis – electric guitar (10)
- Luke Bulla – violin (1, 2, 4–6, 8, 9, 13), mandolin (2, 5, 7, 9, 10, 12)
- Allison Brown – banjola (2, 8, 9, 12), banjo (5–7)
- Frank Howard Swart – bass (1–4, 6, 9, 10, 12)
- Viktor Krauss – upright bass (5, 7, 8, 13)
- Allen Parker – synth loop (8)

Additional Vocalists

- The Shadowboxers – backing vocals (3, 4)
- Lucy Wainwright Roche – guest vocals (5), additional backing vocals (12)

Track 11 (Damo)

- Eamonn de Barra – whistles, flute
- Damien Dempsey – backing vocals
- Clare Kenny – bass
- John McLoughlin – acoustic guitar, mandolin
- John Reynolds – drums

Production

- Peter Collins – producer (1–10, 12–13)
- John Reynolds – producer (11)

== Chart performance ==
The album debuted at No. 2 on the Billboard Folk Albums chart, No. 14 on Top Rock Albums, and No. 36 on the Billboard 200, selling 11,000 in its debut week. The album has sold 42,000 copies in the US as of May 2015.

Chart (2015)	Peak position
US Billboard 200	36
US Americana/Folk Albums (Billboard)	2
US Independent Albums (Billboard)	9
US Indie Store Album Sales (Billboard)	23
US Top Rock Albums (Billboard)	14
