= Look Long =

Studio album by Indigo Girls
- Released: May 22, 2020
- Recorded: January 2019
- Studios: Real World Studios, Box, Wiltshire, England, United Kingdom
- Length: 41:43
- Label: Rounder
- Producer: John Reynolds

Indigo Girls chronology
Live with the University of Colorado Symphony Orchestra (2018)	Look Long (2020)

Look Long is the fifteenth studio album by American folk rock duo Indigo Girls. The album was originally due to be released on April 24, 2020, but was delayed until May 22, 2020. The album has had a positive reception from critics.

== Release and promotion ==
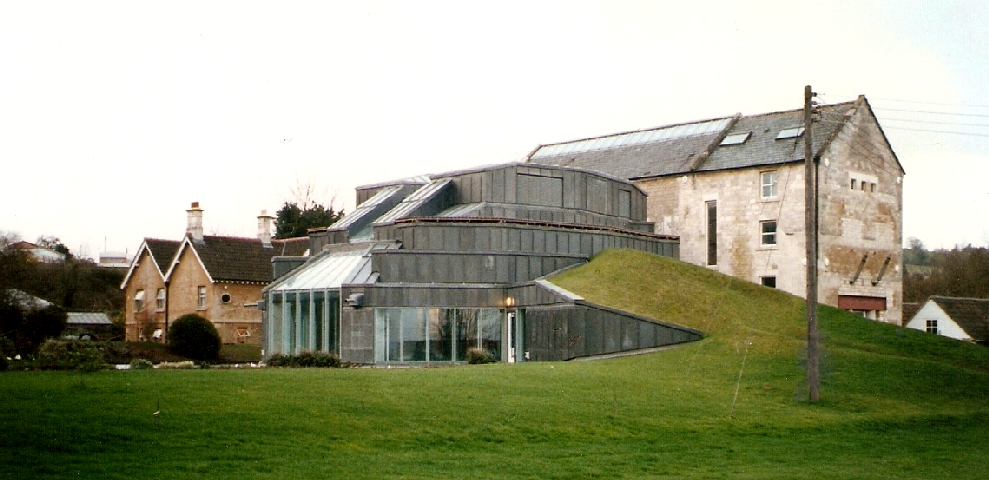
Look Long was recorded at Peter Gabriel's Real World Studios (pictured c. 1990).

The Indigo Girls recorded the album with previous collaborator John Reynolds. The album was preceded by the single "Shit Kickin'" on February 28, 2020, and the announcement of a promotional tour. Tour dates were postponed due to the COVID-19 pandemic in the United States but the duo performed a series of weekly live-streamed concerts online to raise money for charity as well as promote this release. These events were accompanied by a question and answer session and audience requests for performances. They also performed at a virtual festival of musicians raising money for the United Nations Foundation on Mother's Day, 2020.

== Critical reception ==
Writing for the Associated Press, Pablo Gorondi writes that Look Long is "a passionate and tuneful collection on which the combined voices of Amy Ray and Emily Saliers sound as instinctive and magical as ever". The editorial staff of AllMusic Guide gave the release 3.5 out of five stars, with reviewer Stephen Thomas Erlewine remarking has several "jolt[s] of color or stylistic experimentation" and that "the album's heart lies within the musical departures". In the Santa Cruz Sentinel, John Malkin notes the variety of themes in the songwriting: "politics and culture including realms like gun violence in America, gender identity, the paradox of love and loss and good ‘old southern living". In No Depression, Carina Liptak also highlighted the diversity of themes as a strength for the album in addition to the tension between the two vocalists' styles.

== Track listing ==
1. "Shit Kickin'" (Amy Ray) – 3:53
2. "Look Long" (Emily Saliers) – 4:39
3. "Howl at the Moon" (Amy Ray) – 3:42
4. "When We Were Writers" (Emily Saliers) – 3:54
5. "Change My Heart" (Emily Saliers) – 3:46
6. "KC Girl" (Amy Ray) – 3:43
7. "Country Radio" (Emily Saliers) – 3:57
8. "Muster" (Amy Ray) – 3:40
9. "Feel This Way Again" (Emily Saliers) – 2:52
10. "Favorite Flavor" (Amy Ray) – 2:56
11. "Sorrow and Joy" (Emily Saliers) – 4:41

== Personnel ==
Indigo Girls

- Amy Ray – guitar, vocals
- Emily Saliers – guitar, vocals

Additional personnel

- Justin Adams – guitar
- Caroline Dale – cello
- Lyris Hung – violin
- Carol Isaacs – keyboards
- Lucy Jules – vocal harmonies on "Shit Kickin'"
- Clare Kenny – bass guitar
- John Reynolds – drums, percussion, keyboards, production
- Lucy Wainwright Roche – vocal harmonies

== Charts ==
Chart performance for Look Long
Chart (2020)	Peak position
UK Americana Albums (Official Charts)	7
UK Independent Albums (Official Charts)	43
US Billboard 200	159
US Americana/Folk Albums (Billboard)	2
US Top Rock Albums (Billboard)	21

== See also ==
- List of 2020 albums
