= All That We Let In =

Studio album by Indigo Girls
- Released: February 17, 2004
- Genre: Folk rock
- Length: 45:58
- Label: Epic
- Producer: Peter Collins

Indigo Girls chronology
Become You (2002)	All That We Let In (2004)	Despite Our Differences (2006)

Singles from All That We Let In
- 1. "Perfect World"

Professional ratings
Aggregate scores
Source	Rating
Metacritic	(69/100)
Review scores
Source	Rating
Allmusic	3.5/5 stars
Billboard	(favorable)
Blender	3/5 stars
Entertainment Weekly	B+
The Guardian	3/5 stars
PopMatters	(7/10)
Rolling Stone	3/5 stars
Uncut	2/5 stars
USA Today	3/4 stars

All That We Let In is the ninth studio album by the Indigo Girls, released in 2004. The cover art is by alternative comics artist Jaime Hernandez of Love and Rockets fame.

The album was released in two versions: a single-disc, audio-only version and a CD+DVD version containing a 30-minute, bonus DVD with 6 songs.

== Track listing ==
1. "Fill It Up Again" (Emily Saliers) – 3:49
2. "Heartache for Everyone" (Amy Ray) – 3:15
3. "Free in You" (Saliers) – 3:47
4. "Perfect World" (Ray) – 3:36
5. "All That We Let In" (Saliers) – 4:40
6. "Tether" (Ray) – 6:15
7. "Come On Home" (Saliers) – 4:41
8. "Dairy Queen" (Ray) – 3:49
9. "Something Real" (Saliers) – 4:09
10. "Cordova" (Ray) – 3:47
11. "Rise Up" (Saliers) – 4:10

== Track listing – Bonus DVD ==
1. "Dairy Queen"
2. "Fill It Up Again"
3. "Come On Home"
4. "Perfect World"
5. "Galileo"
6. "Kid Fears"
