= Prom (album) =

Studio album by Amy Ray
- Released: April 15, 2005
- Genre: Folk rock
- Length: 32:09
- Label: Daemon

Amy Ray chronology
Stag (2001)	Prom (2005)	Didn't It Feel Kinder (2008)

Prom is the second solo album by Amy Ray of Indigo Girls, released in 2005 on her Daemon Records label.

== Recording and release ==
Prom includes songs written about Ray's personal experience growing up in the American South and they are set in a high school; the music is inspired by punk rock acts including The Clash, Hüsker Dü, and Patti Smith.

== Reception ==
Professional ratings
Review scores
Source	Rating
AllMusic	4.5/5 stars

Editors at AllMusic Guide gave this album 4.5 out of five stars and chose this as an "Album Pick" among Ray's catalog, with critic James Christopher Monger noting that "it's hard to balance sweetness and anger, but Ray—who always manages to find a kind of winsome humor somewhere in the middle—makes it look easy, and her not-so-subtle mix of attitude, nostalgia, and compassion makes for a perfectly enlightening road trip of an album". A review in No Depression notes that this album "covers a lot of ground in its short running time" as the album explores identity.

== Track listing ==
All songs written by Amy Ray

1. "Put It Out for Good" – 3:50
2. "Driver Education" – 2:21
3. "Rural Faggot" – 3:54
4. "Give In" – 1:59
5. "Covered for You" – 4:56
6. "Blender" – 2:06
7. "Sober Girl" – 3:02
8. "Pennies on the Track" – 3:49
9. "Rodeo" – 3:00
10. "Let It Ring" – 3:11

== Personnel ==
- Amy Ray – vocals, electric guitar, production
- David Barbe – backing vocals on "Blender", mixing
- Allen Bleyle – electric guitar on "Driver Education" and "Rural Faggot"
- Jody Bleyle – bass guitar on "Driver Education", "Rural Faggot", "Give In", "Blender", and "Pennies on the Track"; electric guitar on "Rural Faggot" and "Pennies on the Track"; recording
- Brandon Brown – backing vocals and handclaps on "Put It Out for Good"
- Brandon Bush – handclaps and keyboards on "Driver Education"
- Donna Dresch – electric guitar on "Driver Education", "Give In", "Blender", and "Sober Girl"
- Danielle Howle – handclaps on "Driver Education", backing vocals on "Rural Faggot", "Sober Girl", and "Let It Ring"
- Andy LeMaster – backing vocals on "Blender"
- Will Lochamy – handclaps on "Put It Out for Good", backing vocals on "Put It Out for Good", drums on "Put It Out for Good", "Covered for You", "Sober Girl", and "Let It Ring"
- Michelle Malone – electric guitar on "Pennies on the Track", backing vocals on "Give In" and "Pennies on the Track"
- Hunter Manasco – handclaps on "Put It Out for Good"; electric guitar on "Put It Out for Good", "Give In", "Sober Girl", "Covered for You", and "Let It Ring"; backing vocals on "Put It Out for Good", "Covered for You", and "Sober Girl", engineering at Hong Kong School of Sound
- Glen Matullo – handclaps on "Driver Education", editing, overdubbing
- Katharine McElroy – bass guitar on "Put It Out for Good", "Covered for You", "Sober Girl", and "Let It Ring"; keyboards on "Put It Out for Good" and "Driver Education"; backing vocals on "Put It Out for Good" and "Sober Girl"; handclaps on "Put It Out for Good"; vocals on "Covered for You"; engineering at Hong Kong School of Sound
- Les Nuby – backing vocals and handclaps on "Put It Out for Good"
- Laurie Ray – backing vocals on "Let It Ring"
- Nathan Ray – backing vocals on "Let It Ring"
- Simon Ray – backing vocals on "Let It Ring"
- Kate Schellenbach – drums on "Driver Education", "Rural Faggot", "Give In", "Blender", and "Pennies on the Track"
- Maria Taylor – backing vocals on "Blender"
- Colleen Thompson – backing vocals and handclaps on "Put It Out for Good"

Technical personnel

- Tina Bafaro – artwork
- Jeremy Crowder – editing assistance, overdubbing assistance
- Travis Daniels – assistant engineering at Tree Sound Studios
- John Holmes – engineering at Tree Sound Studios
- Sheri Lee – package design
- Thaddeus Levin – intern engineering at Tree Sound Studios
- Bob Ludwig – mastering
- Frances Miranda – engineering at Wet and Dry Studios
- Larry Ray, Sr. – photography
- Ann Tanner – photography
- Chris Verene – photography
