= Indigo Girls =

American folk rock duo

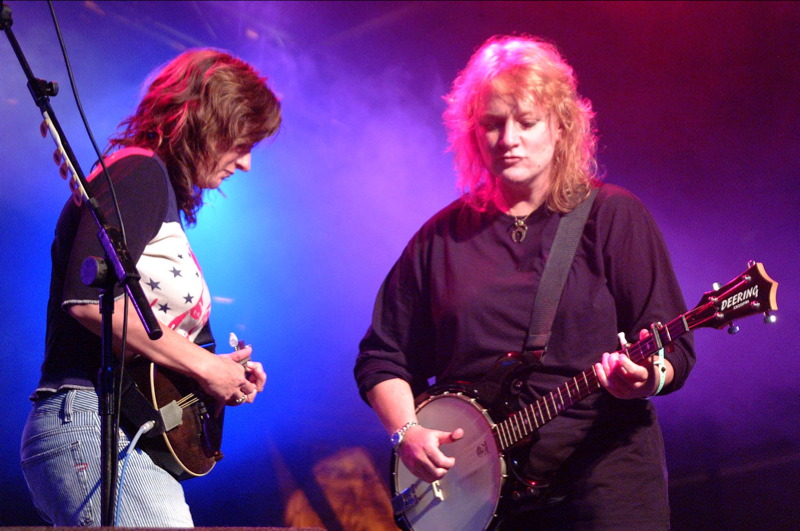
- Indigo Girls performing in 2002

Background information
- Origin: Atlanta, Georgia, U.S.
- Genres: Folk rock; folk
- Years active: 1985–present
- Labels: Indigo; Epic; Legacy; Columbia; Hollywood; IG Recordings/Vanguard; Rounder
- Members: Amy Ray; Emily Saliers
- Website: www.indigogirls.com

Indigo Girls are an American folk rock music duo, consisting of Amy Ray and Emily Saliers. The two met in elementary school and began performing together as high school students in Decatur, Georgia, part of the Atlanta metropolitan area. They started performing with the name Indigo Girls as students at Emory University, performing weekly at The Dugout, a bar in Emory Village.

They released a full-length record album entitled Strange Fire in 1987, and contracted with a major record company in 1988. After releasing nine albums with major record labels from 1987 through 2007, they formed the IG Recordings company in 2009 and resumed self-producing albums.

Outside of working on Indigo Girls–related projects, Ray has released solo albums and founded a non-profit recording label that promotes independent musicians. Saliers is an entrepreneur in the restaurant industry as well as a professional author; she also collaborates with her father, Don Saliers, in performing for special groups and causes. Saliers and Ray are both lesbians and are active in political and environmental causes. They are commonly regarded as queer icons.

== Recording and touring ==
=== Early years ===
Amy Ray and Emily Saliers first met and got to know each other as students at Laurel Ridge Elementary School in DeKalb County, Georgia, just outside Decatur, Georgia, but were not close friends because Saliers was a grade older than Ray. While attending Shamrock High School (now Druid Hills Middle School), they became better acquainted, and started performing together, first as "The B-Band" and then as "Saliers and Ray".

Saliers graduated and began attending Tulane University in Louisiana. A year later, Ray graduated from high school and began attending Vanderbilt University in Tennessee. Homesick, both returned to Georgia and transferred to Emory University in Atlanta (where Saliers' father was a professor).

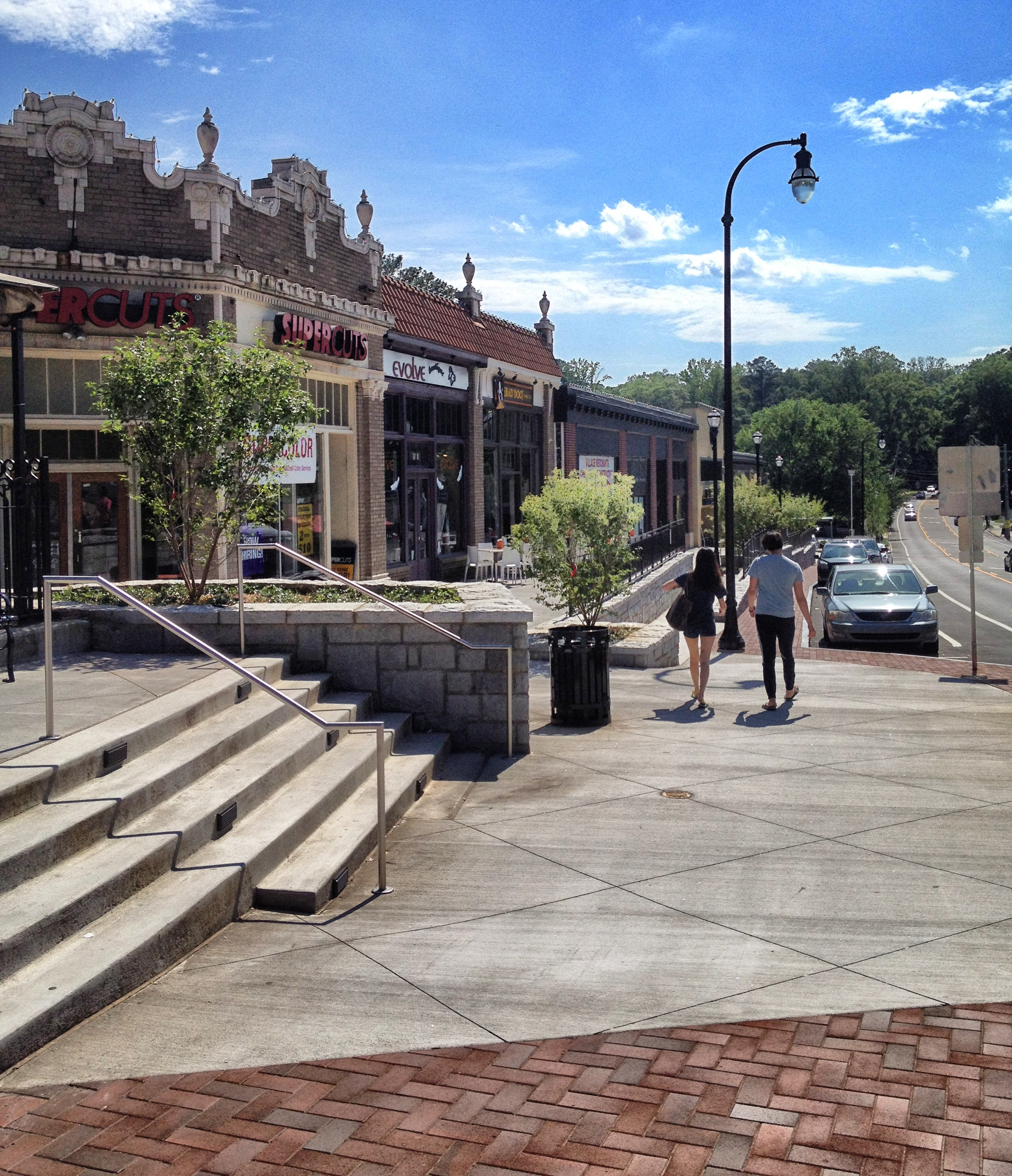
After forming their duo in college, the Indigo Girls played small clubs in the Emory Village district of Druid Hills, Georgia.

By 1985, they had begun performing together again, this time as Indigo Girls. Saliers stated in a March 2007 National Public Radio Talk of the Nation interview, "we needed a name and we went through the dictionary looking for words that struck us and indigo was one."

Their first release in 1985 was a seven-inch single named "Crazy Game", with the B-side "Everybody's Waiting (for Someone to Come Home)". That same year, the Indigo Girls released a six-track extended play album named Indigo Girls, and in 1987 released their first full-length album, Strange Fire, recorded at John Keane Studio in Athens, Georgia, and including "Crazy Game". With this release, they secured the services of Russell Carter, who remains their manager to the present; they had first approached him when the EP album was released, but he told them their songs were "immature" and they were not likely to get a record deal. Strange Fire apparently changed his opinion.

=== Epic Records (1988–2006) ===
The success of 10,000 Maniacs, Tracy Chapman, and Suzanne Vega encouraged Epic Records to enlist other folk-based female singer-songwriters; Epic signed the duo in 1988. Their first major-label release, also named Indigo Girls, which scored No. 22 on the album chart, included a new version of "Land of Canaan", which was also on their 1985 EP album and on Strange Fire. Also on the self-titled release was their first hit "Closer to Fine" (a collaboration with Irish band Hothouse Flowers), which scored No. 52 on the popular music chart and No. 26 on the modern rock chart. They even managed one week on the mainstream rock album-oriented rock music chart at No. 48. In 1990, they won a Grammy Award for Best Contemporary Folk Album.

Their second album, Nomads Indians Saints, went gold in December 1991 and included the hit song "Hammer and a Nail", a No. 12 modern rock music track; it was not as successful as their first, which was certified platinum at about the same time. The Indigo Girls followed it with the live Back on the Bus, Y'all and 1992's album Rites of Passage, featuring the song "Galileo", the duo's first top 10 modern rock music track (#10). During the accompanying tour in December, they invited on a few dates Siouxsie Sioux of Siouxsie and the Banshees as special guest to sing a couple of songs with them. They then recorded Swamp Ophelia in 1994, which went platinum in September 1996, and charted at No. 9 on the Billboard 200 album chart.

In 1995, the Indigo Girls released a live, double CD, 1200 Curfews. Shaming of the Sun was released in 1997 followed by Come on Now Social in 1999. Shaming of the Sun debuted at number seven on the Billboard charts, driven by the duo's contribution to the Lilith Fair music festival tour. The track "Shame on You" received more airplay on adult alternative, top 40 and adult top 40 radio stations than any of their previous singles, although this seemed to be a peak in their crossover success.

Retrospective, a compilation album with two new tracks, was released in 2000 and Become You followed two years later. Their last Epic studio album was All That We Let In, released in 2004 with an accompanying tour. On June 14, 2005, they released Rarities, a collection of B-sides and rare tracks partially decided by fans' input, which fulfilled the album count obligation for their contract with Epic.

=== Hollywood Records (2006–07) ===
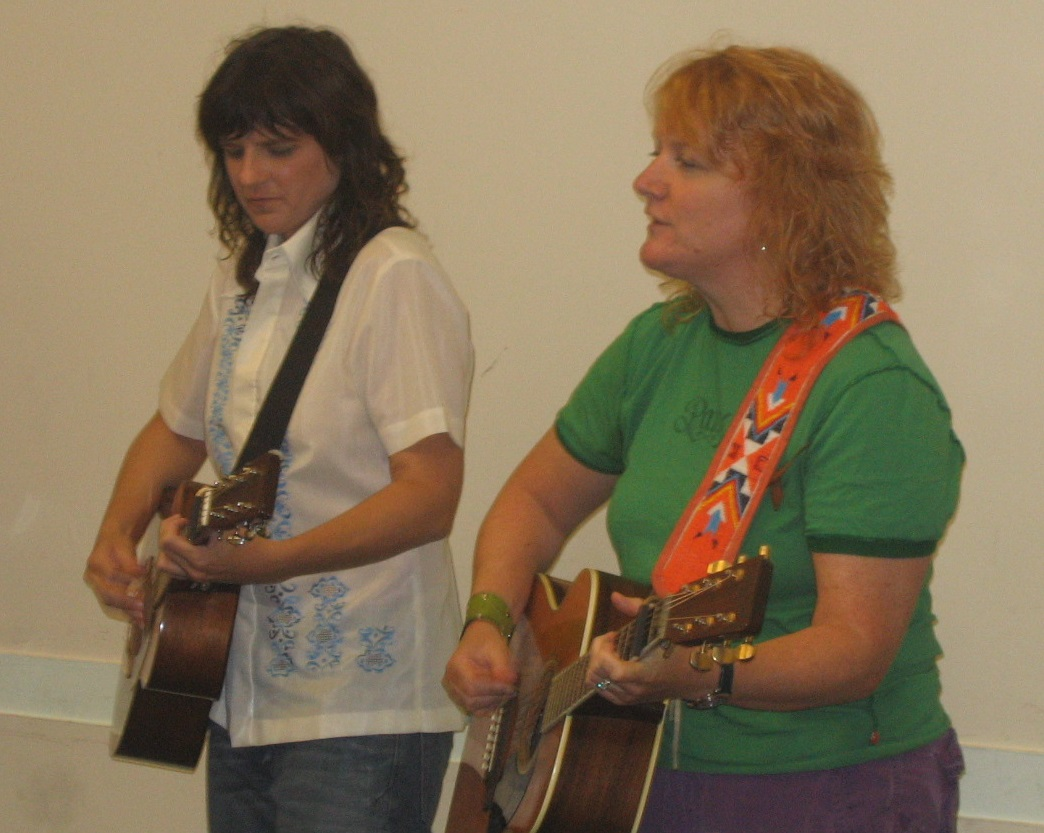
Indigo Girls performing in 2005.

After departing Epic, the Indigo Girls signed a five-record deal with Hollywood Records. Their first (and only) Hollywood album, Despite Our Differences, produced by Mitchell Froom, was released on September 19, 2006. John Metzger from MusicBox Online described Despite our Differences as "the most infectious, pop-infused set that the duo ever has managed to concoct. In fact, its melodies, harmonies, and arrangements are so ingratiating that the album carries the weight of an instant classic." Thom Jurek from AllMusic wrote: "part of an emotional journey as complete as can be. More relevant than anyone dared expect. It's accessible and moving and true. It's their own brand of rock & roll, hewn from over the years, that bears a signature that is now indelible. A moving, and utterly poetic offering."

After releasing Despite Our Differences, the Indigo Girls' contract was terminated by Hollywood Records during their 2007 tour.

=== Independent work (2007–present) ===
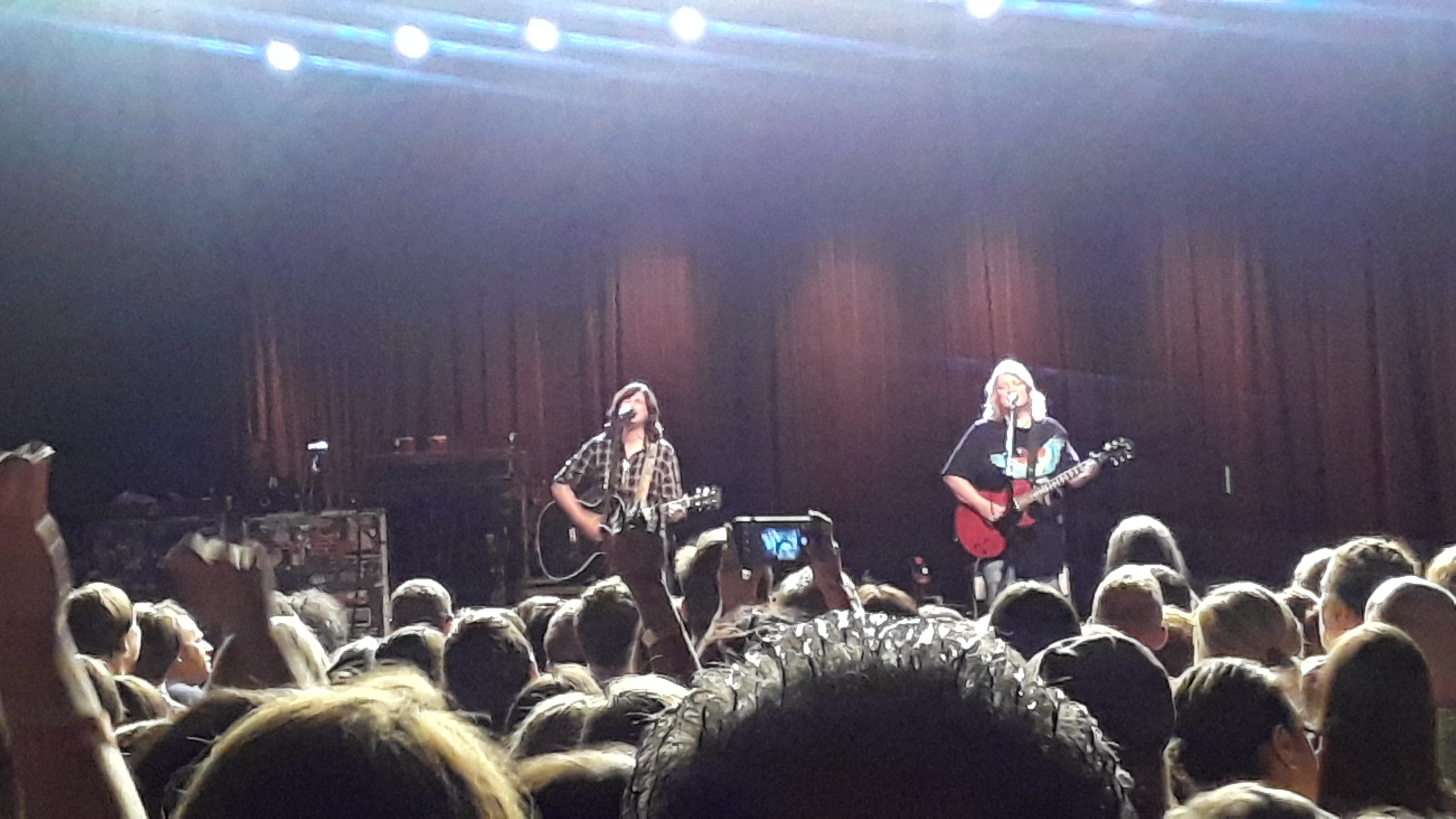
Performing at The Fillmore in Charlotte, North Carolina in 2018

Following their break with Hollywood Records, the Indigo Girls announced their next record would be released independently. Poseidon and the Bitter Bug was released on March 24, 2009, from IG Recordings, the Indigo Girls' label, and distributed through Vanguard Records. This album is their first fully independent release since 1987's Strange Fire, and their first two-CD set since 1995's live album 1200 Curfews; the first disc has the 10 tracks accompanied by a backing band, and the second includes the same 10 songs with only Ray and Saliers on vocals and acoustic guitars, and an additional track. On June 29, 2010 Indigo Girls' second full-length live album, Staring Down the Brilliant Dream, was released on IG Recordings/Vanguard Records. This was followed on October 12, 2010 with their first holiday album Holly Happy Days. Indigo Girls' thirteenth studio album, Beauty Queen Sister, was released on October 4, 2011, and their fourteenth studio album, One Lost Day, was released on June 2, 2015 (both on IG Recordings/Vanguard Records).

Beginning in 2017, the Indigo Girls have toured the United States performing their music arranged for symphony orchestra. After more than 50 performances, in 2018 they released a live double album entitled Indigo Girls Live with the University of Colorado Symphony Orchestra. In 2020, they followed this with the studio album Look Long.

In 2025, Indigo Girls appeared in the feature documentary Lilith Fair: Building a Mystery – The Untold Story, which reflects on the legacy of the all-female music festival.

== Songwriting and influences ==
Ray and Saliers do not ordinarily collaborate in writing songs. Saliers described herself as "a lyric person. [...] I’ve always respected Joni Mitchell and Bob Dylan". Saliers said: "Amy is much more a combination of music and lyrics. She really likes alternative rock a lot, and she likes the feel of certain kinds of music as well as the lyrics. Amy is more stream-of-consciousness. She doesn’t censor herself at all; she just channels it through herself, so in her lyrics, she has tons of different kinds of images, sensual images, things of the earth, that connection to nature. Mine is a much more singer-songwriter intellectual narrative style. I take an idea and try to really pinpoint it, make it as clear as possible".

They write separately and work out the arrangements together. There are a few exceptions, mostly unreleased songs from their early, pre-Epic days: "I Don't Know Your Name" and "If You Live Like That." "Blood Quantum", which appears on Honor: A Benefit for the Honor the Earth Campaign featured Ray's verses and chorus and Saliers's bridge. Finally, "I'll Give You My Skin", which appears both on Tame Yourself (a benefit album for People for the Ethical Treatment of Animals) and on the Indigo Girls release Rarities, is a collaborative work by Ray, Saliers, and Michael Stipe, which is doubly rare because Saliers and Ray usually write their songs without outside collaborators. For their 2002 release, 'Become You,' Ray reported that they handed instruments back and forth to compose leads collaboratively, something they had never done before. In September 2020, the Indigo Girls released "Long Ride", the first song Ray and Saliers had written together in 30 years.

== Touring band ==
The Indigo Girls have toured as a duo and with a band. In 1990, they toured with Atlanta band the Ellen James Society backing them; they have also toured with side players, with one distinct group from 1991 to 1998, a second from 1999 to 2009, members of which appeared on all of the Girls' subsequent albums and which re-formed as a live band in 2023, and a third from 2012 to 2016. Names in bold are of mainstays of the touring band.

First touring band

- **Sara Lee** – bass guitar (1991–98)
- **Jerry Marotta** – drums, percussion (1992–98)
- Budgie – drums (1992)
- Gail Ann Dorsey – bass guitar, support vocals (1994)
- Scarlet Rivera – violin (1992-3)
- Jane Scarpantoni – cello (1992-3, 1995)
- Joshua Segal – guitar, violin, mandolin, vocals (1997)

Second touring band

- **Brady Blade** – drums (2002–04, 2023)
- **Matt Chamberlain** – drums (2006–2009, 2024)
- **Lyris Hung** – violin (2012–)
- **Carol Isaacs** – keyboards, accordion (1999–2007, 2015–16, 2023-)
- **Clare Kenny** – bass guitar (1999–2007, 2023-)
- Matt Brubeck - cello, percussion, vocals (2000)
- Blair Cunningham – drums (2000, 2024)
- Caroline Dale – cello (1999)
- Jeff Fielder – guitar (2023-)
- TK Johnson – drums (2025)
- Caroline Lavelle – cello (2000)
- John Reynolds – drums (1999)
- Julie Wolf – keyboards, accordion (2007–11)

2012–16 touring band

- Jaron Pearlman – drums (2012–2016)
- Benjamin Ryan Williams – bass (2012–2016)
- Lyris Hung – violin (2012–present)
- Carol Isaacs – keyboards, accordion (1999–2007, 2015-6, 2023-4)

== Solo projects ==
In 1990, Ray founded Daemon Records, which has signed Magnapop, Ellen James Society, New Mongrels, Kristen Hall, Rose Polenzani, Girlyman, Athens Boys Choir, and James Hall among others.

Saliers was a founding co-owner of Watershed Restaurant in Decatur, Georgia. She sold Watershed in 2018. Saliers was an initial investor in the Flying Biscuit Cafe in Atlanta, Georgia. In 2005, Saliers and her father, Don Saliers, a theology professor at Candler School of Theology at Emory University, released the book A Song to Sing, a Life to Live: Reflections on Music as Spiritual Practice. They promoted the release of the book together including several days of speaking and performing together at the Washington National Cathedral College in Washington D.C.

Ray has put out six solo albums, entitled Stag, Prom, Live from Knoxville, Didn't It Feel Kinder, Amy Ray: Live MVP, Lung of Love, Goodnight Tender and Holler through Daemon. She has toured with both The Butchies and her bands The Volunteers and the Amy Ray Band. Saliers also released a solo album, Murmuration Nation, in 2017.

== Appearances in other media ==
Ray and Saliers appeared in the 1995 film Boys on the Side, playing short excerpts from their songs "Joking" and "Southland in the Springtime", as well as singing "Feliz Cumpleaños" ("Happy Birthday" in Spanish) with the gathered group of friends during the birthday cake scene, and standing on the far side of several shots over the next few scenes. Neither had spoken lines. The duo also appear in the 2006 documentary Wordplay, where they discuss their reaction to appearing in a New York Times crossword puzzle and then begin to solve one together.

They performed onstage in the 1994 revival of Jesus Christ Superstar in Atlanta, titled Jesus Christ Superstar: A Resurrection. Ray starred as Jesus with Saliers as Mary Magdalene. They later reprised their roles in stagings in Austin, at the South by Southwest (SXSW) festival, and in Seattle.

Ray and Saliers made several cameo appearances on the sitcom Ellen; in the episode "Womyn Fest", Ellen and her friends attend a feminist music festival and catch the end of a performance by the Indigo Girls.

The girls are mentioned multiple times in Stephen King's 1995 novel Rose Madder, and Curtis Sittenfeld's 2023 novel Romantic Comedy, as well as being name-dropped in various TV shows Buffy the Vampire Slayer, Will and Grace, South Park, 30 Rock, The Office, Squidbillies, The Big Bang Theory, Saturday Night Live, Harley Quinn and Nip\Tuck.

Their posters are seen on the British soap Brookside and the 1996 slasher film Scream.

The duo appeared onstage alongside standup comedian Tig Notaro during Notaro's 2018 show "Happy to be Here" at The Heights in Houston, Texas, as a closing bit, performing one song.

In the 2023 film Barbie, Barbie sings along to "Closer to Fine." The song appears three times in the film, as well as in its trailer.

A collection of Indigo Girls' songs is used in the jukebox musical movie Glitter and Doom, which has been touring movie festivals across North America. The film has no confirmed release date.

Indigo Girls are featured in "Foreword: A Conversation with the Indigo Girls, Kathy Mattea, and Lyle Lovett" in Brian T. Atkinson's Love at the Five and Dime: The Songwriting Legacy of Nanci Griffith (Texas A&M University Press, 2024).

== Personal lives ==
Both Ray and Saliers use she/her pronouns. They long identified themselves as lesbians, but more recently Ray and Saliers have publicly commented they are or previously have been sexually attracted to men in their lives, and that they identify as queer. More specifically, Ray has openly talked about her gender dysphoria and identifying as gender-fluid, and the challenges she has felt in her own body. “I definitely still feel like a guy a lot of the time, but I guess I’ve just gotten to a place where, like, ‘Well, I have fought really hard to be in this body and I’m just gonna stay here,’ and also felt somewhat evenly split between male and female to the point where I was like, ‘I don’t know if I can choose, like I think I’m gonna have to just live in the center,’” Ray said. Both Saliers and Ray have spoken openly about having internalized homophobia. Because of their engagements for LGBT rights, they are regarded as icons of the movement.

Amy Ray has long lived in the foothills of the North Georgia Mountains with her longtime partner, filmmaker Carrie Schrader from Seattle, whom she has been with since 2001. In November 2013, Schrader gave birth to the couple’s child, Ozilline “Ozie” Graydon. Ozie is named after Ray’s grandmother, who was also the inspiration for the 1999 Indigo Girls song “Ozilline,” penned by Ray.

Saliers married her longtime girlfriend, former Indigo Girls tour manager Tristin Chipman, at New York City Hall in 2013. Chipman, a Canadian, is from Calgary, "but she spent most of her adult life in Toronto," according to Saliers between songs when performing onstage in Vancouver in 2013.

=== Political activism ===
The Indigo Girls have been politically active, championing the causes of and held benefit concerts for the environment, gay rights, the rights of Native Americans, and the National Coalition to Abolish the Death Penalty. For many years they incorporated a recycling and public outreach program into their road tours by including Greenpeace representative Stephanie Fairbanks in their road crew. They have also appeared at the annual SOA Watch rallies, the March for Women's Lives, and several other rallies and protests.

Ray and Saliers helped Winona LaDuke establish Honor the Earth, an organization dedicated to creating support and education for native environmental issues. After performing on the activist-oriented Spitfire Tour in 1999, Ray and Saliers joined forces with The Spitfire Agency to develop the Honor The Earth Tour, which visits colleges and Native communities, and raises money for their non-profit of the same name. On March 1, 2024, Indigo Girls concluded their involvement with Honor the Earth.

In 2006 Indigo Girls were featured in artist Pink's album I'm Not Dead in the song "Dear Mr. President", which Pink says is a political confrontation with George W. Bush about war, poverty, LGBT rights, abortion rights, and the No Child Left Behind Act. Returning the favor, Pink performed on the Indigo Girls' "Rock and Roll Heaven's Gate," which is about, among other things, sexism and heterosexism in the music industry.

In June 2007 the Indigo Girls were part of the multi-artist True Colors Tour 2007, on the tour's Las Vegas stop which benefited the Human Rights Campaign and other organizations that provide support to the LGBT community. The Indigo Girls performed again on the True Colors Tour 2008.

In April 2013, in response to criticism from transgender activists, the Indigo Girls issued a statement that they would play at the Michigan Womyn's Music Festival, but would protest the festival's "womyn-born womyn" policy from the stage, would donate any money received to trans activism, and would not return to the festival without "visible and concrete signs" that the policy would be changed.

In November 2017, the Indigo Girls were nominated to Out magazine's "OUT100" for 2017 in recognition of their work and their visibility.

The Indigo Girls are also members of the Canadian charity Artists Against Racism and have worked with them on awareness campaigns.

== Discography ==
=== Studio albums ===
Title	Details	Peak chart positions						Certifications
Title	Details	US	US Rock	US Folk	US Indie	AUS	UK	Certifications
Strange Fire	Release date: May 1, 1987; Label: Indigo Records, Epic Records	159	—	—	—	—	—	US: Gold
Indigo Girls	Release date: February 28, 1989; Label: Epic Records	22	—	—	—	64	—	US: 2× Platinum
Nomads Indians Saints	Release date: September 21, 1990; Label: Epic Records	43	—	—	—	—	—	US: Gold
Rites of Passage	Release date: May 12, 1992; Label: Epic Records	21	—	—	—	110	—	US: Platinum
Swamp Ophelia	Release date: May 10, 1994; Label: Epic Records	9	—	—	—	53	81	US: Platinum
Shaming of the Sun	Release date: April 29, 1997; Label: Epic Records	7	—	—	—	83	81	US: Gold
Come on Now Social	Release date: September 28, 1999; Label: Epic Records	34	—	—	—	—	—	
Become You	Release date: March 12, 2002; Label: Epic Records	30	—	—	—	—	—	
All That We Let In	Release date: February 17, 2004; Label: Epic Records	35	—	—	—	—	—	
Despite Our Differences	Release date: September 19, 2006; Label: Hollywood Records	47	16	—	—	—	—	
Poseidon and the Bitter Bug	Release date: March 24, 2009; Label: Vanguard Records	29	11	—	—	—	—	
Holly Happy Days	Release date: October 12, 2010; Label: Vanguard Records	—	—	4	20	—	—	
Beauty Queen Sister	Release date: October 4, 2011; Label: Vanguard Records	36	14	2	9	—	—	
One Lost Day	Release date: June 2, 2015; Label: Vanguard Records	63	7	2	7	—	—	
Look Long	Release date: May 22, 2020; Label: Rounder Records	159	21	2	—	—	—	
"—" denotes releases that did not chart

=== Live albums ===
Title	Details	Peak chart positions				Certifications
Title	Details	US	US Rock	US Folk	US Indie	Certifications
Back on the Bus, Y'all (EP)	Release date: June 4, 1991; Label: Indigo Records, Epic Records	—	—	—	—	
1200 Curfews	Release date: October 10, 1995; Label: Epic Records	40	—	—	—	US: Platinum
Staring Down the Brilliant Dream	Release date: June 29, 2010; Label: Epic Records	119	34	2	18	
Live with the University of Colorado Symphony Orchestra	Release date: June 22, 2018; Label: Rounder Records					
"—" denotes releases that did not chart

- Perfect World was released as a promo CD maxi single on March 1, 2004 together with 3 live tracks.

=== Compilations ===
Title	Details	Peak chart positions		
Title	Details	US	AUS	UK
4.5: The Best of the Indigo Girls	Release date: July 3, 1995; Label: Epic Records	—	81	43
Retrospective	Release date: October 3, 2000; Label: Epic Records	128	—	—
Rarities	Release date: June 14, 2005; Label: Epic Records	159	—	—
Playlist: The Very Best of Indigo Girls	Release date: January 13, 2009; Label: Epic Records	—	—	—
The Essential Indigo Girls	Release date: April 30, 2013; Label: Epic Records	—	—	—
"—" denotes releases that did not chart

=== Singles ===
Year	Title	Chart positions									Album
Year	Title	US	US Alternative	US Rock	US Dance	US Adult	UK	Canada	AUS	GER	Album
1985	"Crazy Game"	—	—	—	—	—	—	—	—	—	Non-album single
1989	"Closer to Fine"	52	26	48	—	—	—	53	57	—	Indigo Girls
1990	"Hammer and a Nail"	—	12	—	—	—	—	—	—	—	Nomads Indians Saints
1992	"Galileo"	89	10	—	—	—	—	—	130	—	Rites of Passage
1992	"Ghost"	—	—	—	—	—	—	—	—	—	Rites of Passage
1994	"Least Complicated"	—	28	—	—	—	98	—	117	—	Swamp Ophelia
1994	"I Don't Wanna Talk About It"	—	—	—	—	—	—	—	—	—	Philadelphia soundtrack
1995	"Touch Me Fall"	—	—	—	—	—	—	—	116	—	Swamp Ophelia
1995	"Power of Two"	—	—	—	—	—	—	—	—	—	Swamp Ophelia
1997	"Shame on You"	—	—	—	—	15	—	—	191	—	Shaming of the Sun
1997	"Get Out the Map"	—	—	—	—	—	—	—	—	—	Shaming of the Sun
1998	"Shed Your Skin"	—	—	—	36	—	—	—	—	—	Shaming of the Sun
1999	"Peace Tonight"	—	—	—	—	40	—	—	—	—	Come on Now Social
1999	"Go"	—	—	—	—	—	—	—	—	—	Come on Now Social
2004	"Fill It Up Again"	—	—	—	—	—	—	—	—	—	All That We Let In
2006	"Dear Mr. President" (with P!nk)	—	—	—	100	88	—	57	5	3	I'm Not Dead
2011	"Making Promises"	—	—	—	—	—	—	—	—	—	Beauty Queen Sister
2015	"Happy In The Sorrow Key"	—	—	—	—	—	—	—	—	—	One Lost Day
2020	"Long Ride"	—	—	—	—	—	—	—	—	—	non-album single
2020	"Shit Kickin'"	—	—	—	—	—	—	—	—	—	Look Long

=== Other contributions ===
- Deadicated (1991), covering "Uncle John's Band"
- Put On Your Green Shoes (1993) – "Wild Wild Party In The Loquat Tree"
- Joan Baez – Ring Them Bells (1995) – "Don't Think Twice, It's All Right"
- Sweet Relief II: Gravity of the Situation (1996) – "Free of Hope"
- Burning London: The Clash Tribute (1999) – "Clampdown"
- 107.1 KGSR Radio Austin – Broadcasts Vol. 10 (2002) – "Moment of Forgiveness"
- WYEP Live and Direct: Volume 4 – On Air Performances (2002) – "Become You"
- Pink – I'm Not Dead (2006) – "Dear Mr President"
- Anne Murray – Anne Murray Duets: Friends & Legends (2007) – "A Little Good News"
- Brandi Carlile – The Story (2007) – "Cannonball"
- Metro: The Official Bootleg Series, Volume 1 (2010)
- Where Have All the Flowers Gone: A Tribute to Pete Seeger, covering "Letter to Eve"
- Looking Into You: A Tribute to Jackson Browne (2014) covering "Fountain Of Sorrow"
- Joan Baez "75th Birthday Celebration" (2016) "The Water is Wide", "Don't Think Twice"

=== Live recording circulation ===
Indigo Girls allow fans to tape their shows, and appropriately gathered recordings can be traded, obtained for free from a number of sources.

== Awards and nominations ==
Americana Music Honors & Awards

Year	Nominee / work	Award	Result	Ref
2022	Spirit of Americana/Free Speech Award	Indigo Girls	Won	

Women Songwriters Hall of Fame

Year	Nominee/work	Award	Result
2022	Indigo Girls	Women Songwriters Hall of Fame	Induction

Pell Awards

Year	Nominee / work	Award	Result
2019	Indigo Girls	Pell Award for Lifetime Achievement in the Arts	Won

GLAAD Media Awards

Year	Nominee / work	Award	Result
2003	Become You	Outstanding Music Album	Nominated

Grammy Awards

Year	Nominee / work	Award	Result
1990	Themselves	Best New Artist	Nominated
1990	Indigo Girls	Best Contemporary Folk Recording	Won
1991	"Hammer and a Nail"	Best Contemporary Folk Recording	Nominated
1992	Back on the Bus, Y'all	Best Contemporary Folk Album	Nominated
1993	Rites of Passage	Best Contemporary Folk Album	Nominated
1995	Swamp Ophelia	Best Contemporary Folk Album	Nominated
1998	Shaming of the Sun	Best Contemporary Folk Album	Nominated

Pollstar Concert Industry Awards

Year	Nominee / work	Award	Result	Ref.
1990	Tour	Club Tour of the Year	Nominated	
