= Michael Lorant =

American singer-musician

Michael Lorant is an American singer and musician, best known for producing the album Jesus Christ Superstar: A Resurrection, a project done with Amy Ray and Emily Saliers, members of the Indigo Girls. He is also well known for performing a live stage version with many musicians from the Atlanta alternative scene. Lorant played guitar, drums, piano, and other instruments for the album. He sang the role of Judas Iscariot, and also sang the roles of other characters on the album.

== Discography ==
- Jesus Christ Superstar: A Resurrection
