= Murmuration Nation =

Studio album by Emily Saliers
- Released: August 11, 2017
- Recorded: 2016
- Studio: Reservoir Studios, New York City, New York, United States
- Genre: Folk; political music
- Length: 51:35
- Language: English
- Label: Emily Saliers Music
- Producer: Lyris Hung; Ryan Kelly (vocals); Jay Wujun Yow (vocals)

Murmuration Nation is the first solo album by American folk musician and Indigo Girls member Emily Saliers.

== Recording and release ==
Saliers had considered a solo album on and off for two decades prior to this release, while her Indigo Girls bandmate Amy Ray released a string of six solo albums in the 21st century. She set up a successful PledgeMusic campaign to fund the recording. Saliers used this album as an outlet for expressing her interest in groove and rhythm and blues, as well as an interest in hip hop music and beats that would not fit in her typical folk performances. She began composing the songs by sharing short music clips with violinist Lyris Hung, who ended up producing Murmuration Nation. The singer-songwriter toured with a group of musicians that included her Hung and she also performed these solo songs in a set before Indigo Girls' performances in 2018.

== Reception ==
Editors at AllMusic Guide scored this album four out of five stars, with critic James Christopher Monger calling it "a bold, versatile, and often beautiful collection of globally inspired pop songs that infuse the folk-rock/Americana stylings of her flagship group with elements of R&B, hard rock, and worldbeat". In an overview of the worst album covers of the year, Exclaim! included this release at 17 for implying classic metalcore music would be on the album.

== Track listing ==
All songs written by Emily Saliers, except where noted

1. "Spider" (Lyris Hung and Emily Saliers) – 4:46
2. "Fly" – 4:06
3. "Match" (Kristen Hall and Emily Saliers) – 3:35
4. "OK Corral" – 4:07
5. "Serpent Love" (Lyris Hung and Emily Saliers) – 4:45
6. "Long Haul" – 4:07
7. "Sad One" – 4:08
8. "Slow Down Day Friend" – 4:10
9. "I'm High I'm on High" – 5:31
10. "Poethearted" – 3:46
11. "Hello Vietnam" – 3:43
12. "Train Inside" – 4:52

Digital and vinyl editions bonus tracks

13. "331" – 4:26
14. "Second Coming" – 3:36
15. "J'aurais Voulu" – 3:53

== Personnel ==
- Emily Saliers – guitar, vocals
- Will Calhoun – drums, percussion
- Tom Coynne – mastering at Sterling Sound
- Rachel Eckroth – keyboards
- Veronica Ferraro – mixing for Manncom at Super Sonic Scale studios
- Lyris Hung – production
- Ryan Kelly – engineering, vocal production
- Tim Lefebvre – bass guitar
- Jennifer Nettles – vocals on "Long Haul"
- Denise Plumb – package design for Three Star Smoked Fish Co.
- Robert "Sput" Searight – drums, percussion
- Spencer Ward – editing
- James Yost – engineering
- Jay Wujun Yow – second engineering, vocal production

== Chart performance ==
Murmuration Nation entered two Billboard charts in the week of September 2, 2017, at 29 on the Top Album Sales and six on Americana/Folk Albums.

== See also ==
- List of 2017 albums
