= Honor the Earth =

Indigenous-led environmental justice nonprofit

- Formation: 1993
- Type: Non-profit
- Product: Indigenous environmentalism
- Executive director: Krystal Two Bulls
- Key people: Krystal Two Bulls; Winona LaDuke; Amy Ray and Emily Saliers
- Website: https://www.honorearth.org/

Honor the Earth is a non-profit organization dedicated to Indigenous environmental justice. The organization's mission is to protect the lifeways and sovereignty of Indigenous peoples around the globe.

The organization is dedicated to fighting to dismantle settler-colonialism, racial capitalism, white supremacy, and imperialism by helping our communities resist exploitation, withstand crises, and prepare future generations of leadership, according to its website.

== History ==
Honor the Earth was founded in Minnesota in 1993 by Indigo Girls Amy Ray and Emily Saliers after meeting Winona LaDuke, and after consultation with members of the Indigenous Environmental Network, Indigenous Women's Network, and Seventh Generation Fund. LaDuke and other members of Honor the Earth were active in the Dakota Access Pipeline protests.

On March 30, 2023, Honor the Earth was ordered by Becker County District Court to pay a former contract employee $750,000 in damages in a lawsuit stemming from an accusation of sexual harassment in 2015.

Honor the Earth underwent an organizational overhaul following the lawsuit, which included severing all ties with LaDuke. The organization also hired a new board of directors composed entirely of Indigenous women. Executive Director Krystal Two Bulls now leads the organization.

== Campaigns ==
Honor the Earth supports several environmental campaigns rooted in supporting Indigenous communities and grassroots organizers. These include Land Back, the political movement of Indigenous Peoples reclaiming sovereignty over homelands from colonial states, and No Green Colonialism, which opposes so-called environmental projects that perpetuate the extraction of natural resources, land grabs, and displacement of Indigenous populations.

== See also ==
- Indigenous rights
- Environmental justice
- Climate change
- Sustainability
- Green imperialism
