= Brady Blade =

American drummer

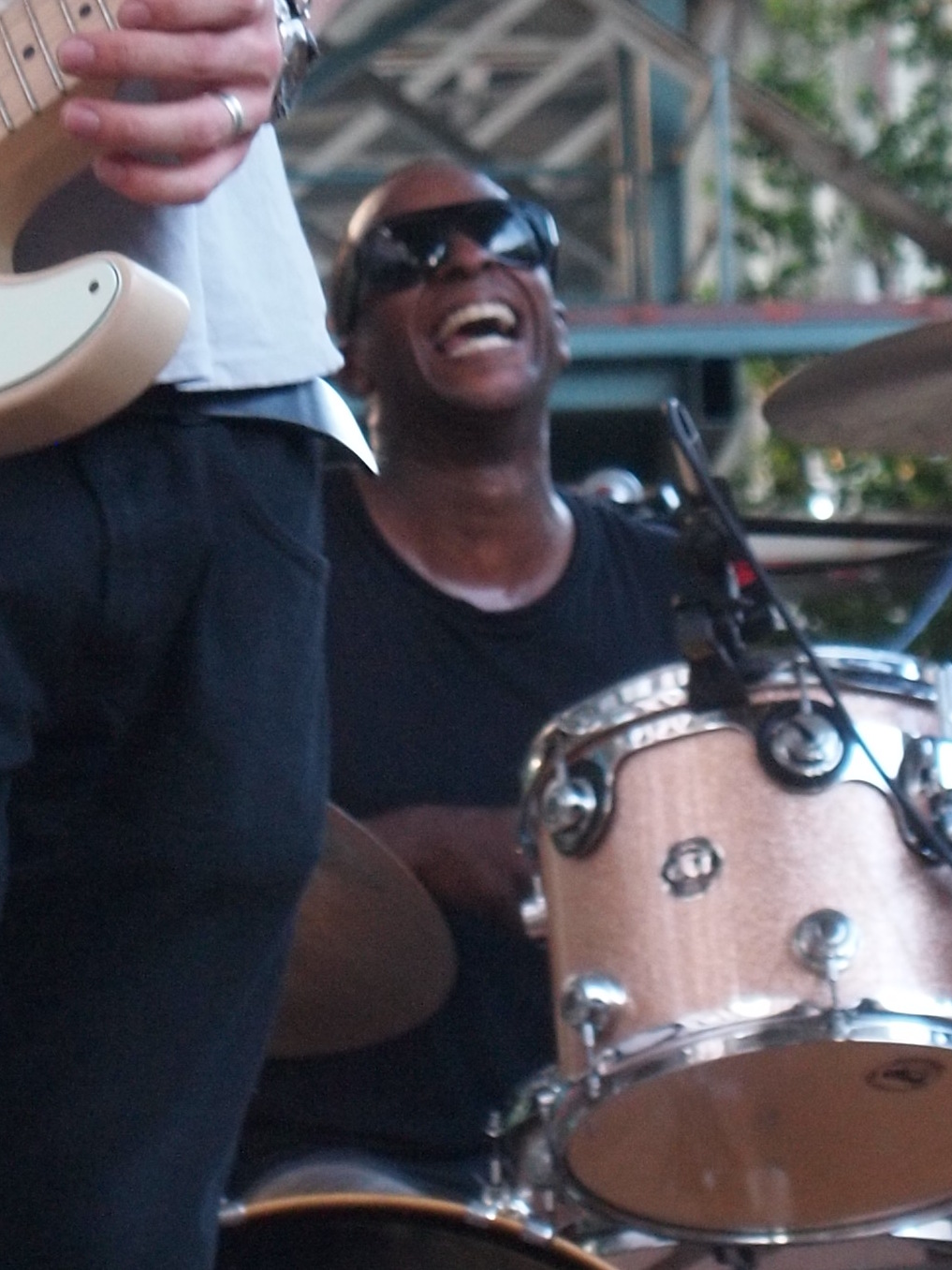
- Blade in 2011

Background information
- Born: Brady L. Blade, Jr. 1965 (age 60–61); Shreveport, Louisiana, United States
- Genres: Rock, pop, country
- Occupations: Drummer, record producer, composer
- Instrument: Drums

Brady L. Blade Jr. (born 1965 in Shreveport, Louisiana) is an American drummer, composer and producer who works rock, pop and country.

He is the son of Dorothy and Pastor Brady Blade Sr. (Pastor of the Zion Baptist Church in Shreveport, Louisiana). His brother is Brian Blade, an award winning jazz drummer and bandleader. Brady is married, has 3 children and resides in Stockholm, Sweden.

Having learned to play drums in both high school and as part of his father's church, Brady initially sought out a career in business, focusing on the music industry. This led to A&R (artists and repertoire) roles at several major record labels, before ultimately becoming manager to the Brand New Heavies. He has played with musicians including Emmylou Harris's band, Spyboy, Steve Earle and the Dukes, Jewel, Dave Matthews & Friends, Buddy & Julie Miller, Anders Osborne, Indigo Girls, and Lucinda Williams.

== The 1990s drumming ==
Early in 1995 saw Emmylou Harris persuade Brady to return to his drum kit as part of her touring band Spyboy, along with Daniel Lanois and Darryl Johnson. The following year they were joined by Buddy Miller and toured throughout the mid-1990s, culminating in a live album Spyboy, released in 1998.

Touring the world with Emmylou Harris led Brady to encounter and be seen by some of the key figures in the American music scene, which resulted in Brady becoming one of the most in-demand session drummers. Brady took part in extensive tours and sessions with the Steve Earle during his El Corazón period; Jewel throughout her 1998 Spirit world tour; and the Indigo Girls on their albums Come on Now Social (1999), Become You (2002), All That We Let In (2004), Beauty Queen Sister (2011) and One Lost Day (2015). He toured with the Indigo Girls in 2023.

== Dave Matthews and Friends ==
A chance meeting with Dave Matthews whilst on tour with Emmylou Harris eventually led to Brady being invited to form the nucleus of Matthew's jam band project, Dave Matthews & Friends, bringing bassist Tony Hall into the project. The group went on to release the album Some Devil, and toured extensively across the US. The group reformed after a period of hiatus to headline the 2004 Bonnaroo Music Festival in Manchester, Tennessee and the 2005 Vegoose music festival.

== 2000s and beyond ==
In recent years, Brady has expanded his work to include production and writing. His work has largely been focused on working with new acts, developing their song-writing and ultimately producing and recording with them. He has had a number of major successes, particularly in Australia and New Zealand, where his work has featured prominently in their national music charts, producing the debut records of both Brooke Fraser and Annabel Fay, plus Annah Mac.

Throughout 2006, Brady toured with Scottish singer Freddie Stevenson across the US and Europe, as well as featuring on the Solomon Burke record Nashville, and on the Waterboys album, Book of Lightning.

Brady announced that he will be touring Taiwan and China, conducting drum clinics and seminars in conjunction with Mapex Drums and Avedis Zildjian Company, throughout May and June.

In early 2013, Brady gathered several musicians, including Jakob Dylan, Dave Matthews, Charlie Sexton, and Sexton's brother Will, to his studio in Shreveport to record. This jam session eventually led to the formation of a band called The Nauts with Blade, Dylan, Matthews, and the Sexton brothers as members. The work was later shelved due to touring and scheduling conflicts.

In summer 2014, Brady appeared on Late Show with David Letterman as a drummer, performing alongside John Doe.

In 2023, Blade toured again with the Indigo Girls. The next year started with Blade partaking in the March 2024 Cayamo Cruise. with the Blade drum and music extravaganza featuring War and Treaty, Shawn Colvin, The Mavericks, Leon Timbre, Rodney Crowell, and The Jammers.

Blade signed on as Lucinda Williams's new drummer along with recording on her latest album, and playing on her 2024 tour. He recorded a song with Steve Earle for the Neil Young tribute album. Blade also produced Darby Sabin's debut album. He toured with Rhiannon Giddens in July and August that year.

2025 Brady hit the road and the sea again playing Jam Cruise, Outlaw Country Cruise and Cayamo Cruise while also touring with Lucinda Williams for an extensive tour of the US and Europe stretching through summer.

== Discography ==
- Brother Sister - Brand New Heavies (1994)
- Doyle Bramhall II - Doyle Bramhall (1995)
- El Corazón - Steve Earle (1997)
- Poison Love - Buddy Miller (1997)
- Terra Incognita - Chris Whitley (1997)
- Burning The Daze - Marc Cohn (1998)
- OST - The Horse Whisperer (1998)
- N'Dea Davenport - N'Dea Davenport (1998)
- No Mermaid - Sinéad Lohan (1998)
- Spyboy - Emmylou Harris (1998)
- Sun Machine - Morley (1998)
- Broken Things - Julie Miller (1999)
- Come on Now Social - Indigo Girls (1999)
- It's About Time - Bobby Whitlock (1999)
- "Jupiter (Swallow the Moon)" - Jewel (1999)
- Big Slow Mover - Phil Cody (2001)
- Buddy & Julie Miller - Buddy & Julie Miller (2001)
- Become You - Indigo Girls (2002)
- Immigrant Flower - Siobhan Maher Kennedy (2002)
- Midnight and Lonesome - Buddy Miller (2002)
- Sidetracks - Steve Earle (2002)
- Too Much Is Always Better Than Not Enough - Diamond Dogs (2002)
- Leave the Light On - Beth Hart (2003)
- Nothing Comes Free - Brigitte DeMeyer (2003)
- Shine - Daniel Lanois (2003)
- Some Devil - Dave Matthews (2003)
- Stumble into Grace - Emmylou Harris (2003)
- All That We Let In - Indigo Girls (2004)
- You are here - Opshop (2004)
- Communicate! - The Solution (2004)
- Clarence Greenwood Recordings - Citizen Cope (2004)
- Impossible Dream - Patty Griffin (2004)
- Love Snuck Up - Buddy & Julie Miller (2004)
- Universal United House of Prayer - Buddy Miller (2004)
- Ship Called Love - Eric Bibb (2005)
- Body on the Line - Freddie Stevenson (2005)
- Annabel Fay - Annabel Fay (2006)
- Nashville - Solomon Burke (2006)
- All My Strange Companions - Freddie Stevenson (2007)
- "Red River Flower - Brigitte De Meyer (2009)
- Age of the Underdog - Stephen Speaks (2011)
- "Alive by Sunrise" - Alive by Sunrise (2011)
