= New Mongrels =

The New Mongrels are a musical ensemble that includes Amy Ray and Emily Saliers of the Indigo Girls, Gherkin, Michelle Malone, DeDe Vogt, members of Cowboy Envy, members of the Big Fish Ensemble, Gerard McHugh, Caroline Aiken, and members of the Dudley Manlove Quartet, under the leadership of Haynes Brooke. The ensemble is an attempt on Brooke's part to bring back to life the Smythe County Mongrels' Society, a group founded by his great-grandfather in 1866. Their recordings appear on Daemon Records.

== Discography ==
- Not Dead (Yet) (1994)
- Big Cup of Empty (1998)
- Raised Incorruptible (2014)
