= Nomads Indians Saints =

Studio album by Indigo Girls
- Released: September 21, 1990; October 3, 2000 (Reissue)
- Recorded: 1990
- Genres: Rock; folk rock
- Length: 46:53
- Label: Epic
- Producer: Scott Litt

Indigo Girls chronology
Indigo Girls (1989)	Nomads Indians Saints (1990)	Rites of Passage (1992)

Singles from Nomads Indians Saints
- 1. "Hammer and a Nail"; 2. "World Falls"; 3. "Watershed"; 4. "1 2 3"

Professional ratings
Review scores
Source	Rating
AllMusic	4.5/5 stars
Chicago Tribune	2/4 stars
Entertainment Weekly	C+
The New York Times	(favorable)
Q	3/5 stars
Rolling Stone	4/5 stars

Nomads Indians Saints is the third studio album by Indigo Girls, released in 1990. It was reissued and remastered in 2000 with three bonus tracks.

== Reception ==
NME said, "The Indigos clearly want to update their genre with modern attitudes and poppy production, avoiding both Nashville's cheesy sentimentalism and Greenwich Village's wordy worthiness. Not every song pulls off this tricky balancing act. The Indigos bury their brightest qualities in clothes which are too often dreary and dated."

== Track listing ==
1. "Hammer and a Nail" (Emily Saliers) – 3:50
2. "Welcome Me" (Amy Ray) – 4:36
3. "World Falls" (Ray) – 3:44
4. "Southland in the Springtime" (Saliers) – 4:19
5. "1 2 3" (Ray, Chris McGuire, Cooper Seay, Bryan Lilje, Scott Bland) – 4:12
6. "Keeper of My Heart" (Ray) – 4:22
7. "Watershed" (Saliers) – 5:44
8. "Hand Me Downs" (Ray) – 3:41
9. "You and Me of the 10,000 Wars" (Saliers) – 4:10
10. "Pushing the Needle Too Far" (Ray) – 4:12
11. "The Girl with the Weight of the World in Her Hands" (Saliers) – 4:21

2000 reissue bonus tracks

12. "Welcome Me" (Live) (Ray) – 4:35 (Live at the Hopi Civic Center on the Hopi Reservation, Kyostmovi, AZ, May 24, 1995)
13. An Interview by Shawn Colvin – 8:51 (Unknown Radio Studio, New York, NY, August, 1990)
14. "You and Me of the 10,000 Wars" (Live) – 4:21 (Live at Paramount Theatre, Denver, CO, October 21 and October 22, 1990)

== Personnel ==
Indigo Girls

- Amy Ray – vocals, guitars
- Emily Saliers – vocals, guitars

Additional personnel

- Sara Lee – bass (1–4, 6, 7 & bonus 1)
- Paulinho Da Costa – percussion (1, 2, 7, 9)
- Kenny Aronoff – drums (1, 2, 7), African drums and percussion (8, 9)
- Peter Holsapple – accordion (1 10), keyboard (8)
- John Jennings – slide guitar (2), acoustic guitar (4), electric guitar (7)
- Benmont Tench – fake accordion (1)
- Mary Chapin Carpenter – backing vocals (1, 4)
- Gerard McHugh – backing vocals (2)
- Peter Buck – Appalachian dulcimer (3)
- The Louies – percussion (3)
- Michelle Malone – backing vocals (3)
- Craig Edwards – fiddle (4)
- Jim Keltner – drums (4)
- Jay Dee Daugherty – drums (9)
- Michael Lorant – drums (10)
- Bill Meyers – string arrangements (11)
- Jerry Marotta – percussion (bonus 1)
- Jane Scarpantoni – cello (bonus 1)

Ellen James Society (track 5)

- Chris McGuire – electric rhythm guitar (5)
- Cooper Seay – electric lead guitar (5)
- Bryan Lilje – bass (5)
- Scott Bland – drums (5)

== Charts ==
Chart (1990–91)	Peak position
Canada Top Albums/CDs (RPM)	54
US Billboard 200	43

== Certifications ==
Region	Certification	Certified units/sales
United States (RIAA)	Gold	500,000^{^}
^{^} Shipments figures based on certification alone.
