= Become You =

Studio album by Indigo Girls
- Released: March 12, 2002
- Genre: Folk rock
- Length: 48:11
- Label: Epic
- Producer: Peter Collins

Indigo Girls chronology
Come on Now Social (1999)	Become You (2002)	All That We Let In (2004)

Singles from Become You
- 1. "Moment of Forgiveness"; 2. "Become You"; 3. "Hope Alone/Bitteroot"; 4. "Our Deliverance"

Professional ratings
Aggregate scores
Source	Rating
Metacritic	(69/100)
Review scores
Source	Rating
Allmusic	4/5 stars
The A.V. Club	(average)
Billboard	(favorable)
Blender	3/5 stars
Chicago Tribune	(average)
E! Online	B
PopMatters	8/10 stars
Q	3/5 stars
Rolling Stone	3/5 stars
Yahoo! Music UK	7/10 stars

Become You is the eighth studio album by American folk rock duo the Indigo Girls. It was released on March 12, 2002 by Epic Records.

== Track listing ==
Standard edition
No.	Title	Writer(s)	Length
1.	"Moment of Forgiveness"	Amy Ray	3:13
2.	"Deconstruction"	Emily Saliers	4:15
3.	"Become You"	Ray	3:46
4.	"You’ve Got to Show"	Saliers	4:44
5.	"Yield"	Ray	2:48
6.	"Collecting You"	Saliers	4:31
7.	"Hope Alone"	Saliers, Annie Roboff	3:56
8.	"Bitterroot"	Ray	2:46
9.	"Our Deliverance"	Saliers	4:12
10.	"Starkville"	Ray	4:22
11.	"She's Saving Me"	Saliers	5:04
12.	"Nuevas Señoritas"	Ray	4:34

These bonus tracks were only available when the album was purchased at Borders. The original version of Everything In Its Own Time was released on the album Shaming of the Sun and credited to Emily Saliers only.

Bonus tracks
No.	Title	Writer(s)	Length
13.	"Our Deliverance (Alternate Version)"	Saliers	4:12
14.	"Everything in Its Own Time (Live)"	Ray; Saliers	5:12
15.	"Johnny Rottentail"	Ray	2:00

== Personnel ==
Indigo Girls

- Amy Ray – vocals, acoustic guitar, mandolin, bouzouki, harmonica
- Emily Saliers – vocals, 6 and 12 string acoustic guitars, classical guitar, electric guitar, bouzouki, mandolin

Additional musicians

- Carol Isaacs – Hammond B-3, Wurlitzer, piano, accordion, penny whistle, recorder, percussion
- Clare Kenny – acoustic and electric bass guitars
- Brady Blade – drums and percussion
- Michelle Malone – vocals on "Moment of Forgiveness" and "Hope Alone", vocals and harmonica on "Bitterroot"
- Dan Higgins – saxophone on "You've Got to Show"
- Jerry Hey – string arrangement on "Hope Alone"
