= Closer to Fine =

1989 single by Indigo Girls

Single by Indigo Girls

from the album Indigo Girls
- B-side: "History of Us"
- Released: June 1989
- Genre: Folk
- Label: Epic
- Songwriter: Emily Saliers
- Producer: Scott Litt

Indigo Girls singles chronology
"Land of Canaan" (1989)	"Closer to Fine" (1989)	"Hammer and a Nail" (1990)

Music video
- "Closer to Fine" on YouTube

"Closer to Fine" is a song by American folk rock duo Indigo Girls. The song was written by Emily Saliers, who also sang lead vocals, and was released in 1989 as the first single from their eponymous second album. The song primarily speaks to the search for meaning in life. "Closer to Fine" was reviewed favorably, and although it was only a modest hit initially, it went on to become the duo’s signature song.

== Composition ==
"Closer to Fine" is written by Emily Saliers, half of the Indigo Girls duo. Both Saliers and Amy Ray, the other band member, play acoustic guitar and sing on this track, giving the song a melody and a countermelody. The lyrics, termed by Trish Bendix of The New York Times as "slightly inscrutable", center around the search for meaning in life introspectively and in the wider world. The verses of the song, which are sung over four chords, build to the chorus, louder and resting an octave higher:

"I went to the doctor, I went to the mountains
I looked to the children, I drank from the fountains
There's more than one answer to these questions
Pointing me in a crooked line.
And the less I seek my source for some definitive,
Closer I am to fine."

The song does not directly answer the question of meaning, instead advising to ask questions about life in a continuous search for potential answers. In an interview with The New York Times, Saliers said she felt that the song advised making life a little better by seeking small pieces of knowledge from a wide variety of sources, instead of looking for a universal truth in one place.

== Reception ==
Reception for "Closer to Fine" was positive. In the UK, Robin Smith of Record Mirror called it "a darned fine song", describing it as "full of fruity guitars, lush lyrics and a chorus that makes you want to go and roll around in a field of clover". NME ranked it at number 15 on its list of the 50 best tracks of 1989. Billboard ranked it 17th on its list of the 65 best LGBTQ anthems. Reviewers have hailed "Closer to Fine" as a road trip song: Maria Lorusso of All Things Considered argues that the friendship between Ray and Saliers, and the melody/counter-melody singing it gives rise to, gives the song "extremely high singalong potential". Saliers agreed with the idea an interview, commenting that "it's got a very easy melody and really easy chorus, and the chorus repeats".

"Closer to Fine" experienced a resurgence in popularity when it was featured in the 2023 film Barbie. It was played on three occasions in the film. A cover of the song recorded by Brandi Carlile is included on the expanded edition of the film's soundtrack.

== Charts ==
Chart performance for "Closer to Fine"
Chart (1989)	Peak position
US Billboard Hot 100	52
US Adult Contemporary (Billboard)	48
US Alternative Airplay (Billboard)	26
US Mainstream Rock (Billboard)	48
