= Stag (Amy Ray album) =

Studio album by Amy Ray
- Released: May 6, 2001
- Genre: Folk punk
- Length: 34:57
- Label: Daemon

Amy Ray chronology
Stag (2001)	Prom (2005)

Stag is the debut solo album by Amy Ray of Indigo Girls, released in 2001 on her Daemon Records label. Ray is accompanied by the Butchies, the Rockateens, Joan Jett, Josephine Wiggs and Kate Schellenbach on the album. She attributes the Butchies with contributing a punk rock influence to some of the songs.

== Reception ==
Professional ratings
Review scores
Source	Rating
AllMusic	4/5 stars
Rolling Stone	4.5/5 stars

Stag received positive reviews from critics noted at review aggregator Metacritic. It has a weighted average score of 82 out of 100, based on 11 reviews. Editors at AllMusic Guide scored this album four out of five stars, with critic Kelly McCartney calling this music worth listening to for Ray's ability to express herself purely as a musician "from political outrage to self-doubt, from hardcore guitars to mandolins". A PopMatters review informs Indigo Girls fans that they will find this album to be a "snarling, beautiful surprise". In Rolling Stone, David Peisner notes that while Ray's tone and musical genre have changed, her interests as a songwriter and activist have not, writing, "she covers familiar ideological turf here, but her assaults on sexism, prejudice and general hate-mongering take on a distinctly personal spin". Billboard highlighted this release, noting that Indigo Girls fans have awaited a chance to hear Ray's rock influences for a decade and summing up the review that this is "an extraordinarily potent recording, one that will likely be among 2001's best".

== Track listing ==
All songs written by Amy Ray, except where noted.

1. "Johnny Rottentail" – 2:00
2. "Laramie" – 5:10
3. "Lucystoners" – 3:56
4. "Hey Castrator" – 4:05
5. "Late Bloom" – 2:24
6. "Measure of Me" (Amy Ray and Kaia Wilson) – 5:55
7. "Black Heart Today" – 2:10
8. "Mtns of Glory" – 2:11
9. "Lazyboy" – 3:05
10. "On Your Honor" – 4:01

== Personnel ==
- Amy Ray – guitar and vocals
- Gerry Hansen – drums
- Kelly Hogan – guitar and vocals
- Larry Holt – guitar
- Danielle Howle – vocals
- Joan Jett – guitar and vocals
- Will Lochamy – drums
- Chris Lopez – guitar, drums, and vocals
- Hunter Manasco – guitar and vocals
- Alison Martlew – bass guitar
- Katharine McElroy – bass guitar and vocals
- Kate Schellenbach – drums and glockenspiel
- Josephine Wiggs – bass guitar and keyboards
- Kaia Wilson – guitar and vocals
- Melissa York – drums, percussion and vocals
