= Strange Fire =

Studio album by Indigo Girls
- Released: May 1, 1987
- Recorded: 1985–87
- Studios: John Keane Studio, Athens, Georgia
- Genre: Folk
- Length: 36:45
- Labels: Indigo (Canada); Epic (US)
- Producer: John Keane

Indigo Girls chronology
Strange Fire (1987)	Indigo Girls (1989)

Singles from Strange Fire
- 1. "Crazy Game"; 2. "Get Together"; 3. "Land of Canaan"

Professional ratings
Review scores
Source	Rating
AllMusic	2.5/5 stars
Q	3/5 stars
The Rolling Stone Album Guide	2/5 stars

Strange Fire is the debut studio album by American folk rock duo Indigo Girls. It was originally released independently on Indigo Records in Canada with eleven tracks. Epic Records signed the duo in 1988, and after their eponymous second album became a commercial success in early 1989, Epic re-released this album in the United States with a different running order, two tracks removed, and a new track, a cover of the Youngbloods' hit "Get Together".

Strange Fire was certified gold by the RIAA in November 1996. The Epic version was remastered and reissued in 2000 with two bonus tracks.

== Track listing ==
No.	Title	Writer(s)	Length
1.	"Make It Easier"	Emily Saliers	3:59
2.	"Walk Away"	Amy Ray	5:29
3.	"Crazy Game"	Saliers	2:53
4.	"I Don't Wanna Know"	Michelle Malone; Ray	3:16
5.	"You Left It Up to Me"	Ray	4:57
6.	"Hey Jesus"	Saliers	4:08
7.	"Strange Fire"	Ray	5:29
8.	"High Horse"	Saliers
9.	"Left Me a Fool"	Saliers	4:53
10.	"Land of Canaan"	Ray	4:09
11.	"Blood and Fire"	Ray	4:38

1989 Epic Records release (US)

No.	Title	Writer(s)	Length
1.	"Strange Fire"	Amy Ray	5:29
2.	"Crazy Game"	Emily Saliers	2:53
3.	"Left Me a Fool"	Saliers	4:53
4.	"I Don't Wanna Know"	Michelle Malone; Ray	3:16
5.	"Hey Jesus"	Saliers	4:08
6.	"Get Together"	Chet Powers	3:32
7.	"Walk Away"	Ray	5:29
8.	"Make It Easier"	Saliers	3:59
9.	"You Left It Up to Me"	Ray	4:57
10.	"Land of Canaan"	Ray	4:09

2000 reissue bonus tracks

No.	Title	Writer(s)	Length
11.	"Crazy Game" (Single Version)	Saliers	3:29
12.	"Everybody's Waiting for Someone to Come Home"	Ray	5:12

"Blood and Fire" was left off the Epic Records re-release in 1989 as it had already been included on the group's sophomore album Indigo Girls. "Land of Canaan" appears on both albums, but as two different recordings of the song. "High Horse" has never been re-released.

== Personnel ==
Indigo Girls

- Amy Ray - vocals, guitar
- Emily Saliers - vocals, guitar

with:

- Annie "Stan" Richardson - flute on "Crazy Game"
- Nita Karpf - cello on "Left Me a Fool"
- Sandy Garfinkle - harmonica on "I Don't Wanna Know" and "Land of Canaan"
- Dede Vogt - mandolin on "I Don't Wanna Know"
- Michelle Malone - vocals on "I Don't Wanna Know"

== Charts ==
Chart (1989–90)	Peak position
US Billboard 200	159

== Certifications ==
Region	Certification	Certified units/sales
United States (RIAA)	Gold	500,000^{^}
^{^} Shipments figures based on certification alone.
