= Goodnight Tender =

Studio album by Amy Ray
- Released: January 28, 2014
- Genre: Country rock
- Length: 42:40
- Language: English
- Label: Daemon
- Producer: Phil Cook; Amy Ray

Amy Ray chronology
Lung of Love (2012)	Goodnight Tender (2014)	The Tender Hour: Amy Ray Live from Seattle (2015)

Goodnight Tender is a studio album by American folk rock singer-songwriter Amy Ray, released on Daemon Records in 2014. The album has received positive reviews from critics and marked a shift in Ray's songwriting toward more Americana and country music roots.

== Reception ==
Goodnight Tender received positive reviews from critics noted at review aggregator Metacritic. It has a weighted average score of 80 out of 100, based on five reviews. Editors of AllMusic Guide chose this as a "Best of 2014" pick, rating it four out of five stars, with critic Thom Jurek noting that Ray's "use of country music as a way of getting these songs across is not only convincing, it's compelling". Writing for American Songwriter, Hal Horowitz rated this album four out of five stars, praising her experiment with genre and noting that "Ray's distinctive, always emotive voice can be tender or tough, frisky or forlorn and any combination of those, but always compliments the music and lyrics". Matt Casarino of PopMatters gave Goodnight Tender an eight out of 10, writing that Ray understands the internal logic of country music and he particularly praised Ray's voice, noting that it is "deeper than ever – she’s effortless on some low notes that would give Trace Adkins trouble – but it’s also smooth and mature, with just the tiniest trace of that whiskey-nightcap rasp"

== Track listing ==
All songs written by Amy Ray, except where noted.

1. "Hunter's Prayer" – 3:36
2. "Oyster and Pearl" – 4:00
3. "The Gig That Matters" – 3:41
4. "Time Zone" – 4:26
5. "Anyhow" – 3:03
6. "Duane Allman" – 2:51
7. "More Pills" – 3:35
8. "Broken Record" – 3:11
9. "Goodnight Tender" – 4:01
10. "My Dog" – 2:23
11. "Let the Spirit" – 4:05
12. "When You Come for Me" (Heather McEntire) – 3:47

== Personnel ==
=== Musicians ===
- Amy Ray – guitar, vocals; mandolin (6, 10, 11)
- Jon Ashley – harmony vocals (9)
- Jim Brock – drums (1, 4, 6, 7, 9, 10; percussion (5, 11)
- Adrian Carter – fiddle (1, 5, 6, 11)
- Brad Cook – bass guitar and harmony vocals (2, 3, 8)
- Phil Cook – electric slide guitar (2), Wurlitzer electric organ (2, 8); harmony vocals (2, 3, 8, 12); banjo (3); piano (11, 12)
- Jeff Fielder – bass guitar on (1, 4, 7, 10); electric guitar (1, 6, 7, 9); harmony vocals (1, 5, 9); piano and acoustic guitar (4), dobro (5, 11); banjo (4, 10, 11); baritone guitar (10)
- Kelly Hogan – harmony vocals on (4, 9)
- Jake Hopping – double bass (1, 5, 6, 9, 11)
- Terry Lonergan – drums (2, 3, 8, 12)
- Heather McEntire – harmony vocals (3)
- Matt Smith – pedal steel guitar (1, 4, 6, 7, 9)
- Brian Speiser – harmony vocals (1, 5, 8, 9)
- Susan Tedeschi – harmony vocals (6)
- Hannah Thomas – harmony vocals (1, 7, 8); vocals (12)
- Justin Vernon – vocal harmonies (2, 3, 8, 11, 12); banjo (2); mandolin (3); slide mandolin (8); electric guitar (12)

=== Producers and others ===
- Amy Ray – production
- Jon Ashley – assistant engineering
- Jim Brock – production assistance
- Mark Chalecki – mastering at Little Red Book Mastering
- Phil Cook – production
- Jeff Fielder – production assistance
- Paul Dunlap – photography
- Susan Gramling – design concept
- Mark Greenberg – engineering for Kelly Hogan's harmony vocals (4, 9)
- Brian Joseph – engineering for Phil Cook's piano (11, 12)
- Jaron Pearlman – additional engineering
- Denise Plumb – artwork, design at Seedless Pictures
- Trina Shoemaker – mixing at Local Honey Studios
- Brian Speiser – recording, production assistance
- Bobby Tis – engineering for Susan Tedeschi's harmony vocals (6)

== See also ==
- List of 2014 albums
