= Didn't It Feel Kinder =

Studio album by Amy Ray
- Released: August 5, 2008
- Genre: Folk rock
- Length: 37:55
- Label: Daemon
- Producer: Greg Griffith

Amy Ray chronology
Live from Knoxville (2006)	Didn't It Feel Kinder (2008)	MVP Live (2010)

Didn't It Feel Kinder is Amy Ray's third solo album. It was released on August 5, 2008.

== Reception ==
Editors of AllMusic Guide scored this album 3.5 out of five stars, with the site's review noting the shift toward indie rock on this album and the strength and insight of Ray's lyrics. In Paste, Christine Van Dusen considers this the first Ray solo album where she has found her sound apart from Indigo Girls, crediting this to producer Greg Griffith.

== Track listing ==
1. "Birds of a Feather" – 3:43
2. "She's Got to Be" – 5:25
3. "Bus Bus" – 2:55
4. "Cold Shoulder" – 2:55
5. "Who Sold the Gun" – 3:08
6. "Out on the Farm" – 4:39
7. "SLC Radio" – 4:44
8. "Blame Is a Killer" – 2:37
9. "Stand and Deliver" – 3:43
10. "Rabbit Foot" – 5:01

=== Bonus tracks ===
eMusic

11. "Angel Egg" – 2:05
12. "Cold Shoulder" (Alternate Version) – 3:03

Napster

11. "Blame Is a Killer" (Alternate Version) – 2:58

iTunes Store

11. "Me and My Baby" – 2:00
12. "She's Got to Be" (Alternate Version) – 5:20

== Personnel ==
- Amy Ray – acoustic guitar, electric guitar, vocals
- Nick Byron Campbell – electric guitar
- Brandi Carlile – background vocals
- James DeDakis – percussion, drums
- Andrew Dunn – piano, trombone, keyboards
- Alex Hornbake – bass guitar, engineering
- Tomi Martin – electric guitar
- Trina Meade – background vocals
- Benjamin Morris – wigler, vocals
- Zac Rae – Hammond organ, clavinet, Mellotron, Wurlitzer, toy piano
- Kaia Wilson – electric guitar
- Melissa York – percussion, drums

Technical personnel

- Donn Aaron – assistant
- Erin Bradley Dangar – package design
- Julian Dreyer – engineering
- John Holmes – engineering
- Danny Kadar – production, engineering, mixing
- Colin Leonard – assistant
- Larry Ray, Sr. – photography
- Kate Schellenbach – paintings
- Glenn Schick – mastering
- Lisa Sullivan – photography
