= Indigo Girls (album) =

Studio album by Indigo Girls
- Released: February 28, 1989; October 3, 2000 (Reissue)
- Recorded: 1988
- Studios: Ocean Way, Hollywood; John Keane, Athens, Georgia; Can Am, Tarzana, California
- Genre: Folk
- Length: 44:36; 51:43 (2000 reissue)
- Label: Epic
- Producer: Scott Litt

Indigo Girls chronology
Strange Fire (1987)	Indigo Girls (1989)	Nomads Indians Saints (1990)

Singles from Indigo Girls
- 1. "Closer to Fine"; 2. "Tried to Be True"

Professional ratings
Review scores
Source	Rating
AllMusic	4.5/5 stars
The Encyclopedia of Popular Music	4/5 stars
Hi-Fi News & Record Review	B:2
New Musical Express	8/10
The Philadelphia Inquirer	4/4 stars
Q	4/5 stars
Rolling Stone	3/5 stars
(The New) Rolling Stone Album Guide	4/5 stars
The Village Voice	C−

Indigo Girls is the second studio album and first major label release by American folk rock duo the Indigo Girls. It was originally released in 1989 by Epic Records, and reissued and remastered in 2000 with two bonus tracks.

Upon its release, the album received mostly positive reviews from critics, went gold after six months and eventually went platinum. The duo was nominated for a Best New Artist Grammy (losing to Milli Vanilli, who later vacated the award), and won one for Best Contemporary Folk Recording.

Michael Stipe sang on "Kid Fears", and the other members of R.E.M. performed on "Tried to Be True". In addition, the Irish band Hothouse Flowers contributed background vocals on several tracks, notably "Closer to Fine".

== Track listing ==
No.	Title	Writer(s)	Length
1.	"Closer to Fine"	Emily Saliers	3:59
2.	"Secure Yourself"	Amy Ray	3:34
3.	"Kid Fears"	Ray	4:33
4.	"Prince of Darkness"	Saliers	5:22
5.	"Blood and Fire"	Ray	4:37
6.	"Tried to Be True"	Ray	2:56
7.	"Love's Recovery"	Saliers	4:21
8.	"Land of Canaan"	Ray	3:55
9.	"Center Stage"	Ray	4:46
10.	"History of Us"	Saliers	5:20
Total length:			44:36

2000 reissue bonus tracks
No.	Title	Writer(s)	Length
11.	"Land of Canaan" (Radio Single Remix)	Ray	3:06
12.	"Center Stage" (Live)	Ray	4:04
Total length:			51:43

== Personnel ==
Indigo Girls

- Amy Ray – lead vocals (2, 3, 5, 6, 8, 9), support/harmony vocals (1, 4, 7), guitars
- Emily Saliers – lead vocals (1, 4, 7, 10), support/harmony vocals (2, 3, 6, 8, 9), guitars, 12-string electric guitar (2), lead electric guitar (6)

Additional personnel

- Peter O'Toole (Hothouse Flowers) – mandolin on (1,2), backing vocals (1)
- Fiachna Ó Braonáin – tin whistle, backing vocals (1), Hammond organ (2)
- Liam Ó Maonlaí – bodhrán and backing vocals (1)
- Luka Bloom – backing vocals (1)
- Paulinho Da Costa – percussion (1, 2, 4, 8)
- Dede Vogt – bass (2, 3, 7, 10)
- Jay Dee Daugherty – drums (2, 4, 8)
- John Keane – 12-string electric guitar (3), bass (4), shaker (6), slide guitar (8, 9), bass drum (9)
- Michael Stipe – backing vocals (3)
- Bill Berry – drums (6)
- Peter Buck – electric guitar (6)
- Mike Mills – bass (6)
- Jai Winding – piano (7)
- Kasim Sulton – bass (8)
- John Van Tongeren – keyboards (10)

== Charts ==
Chart (1989)	Peak position
Australian Albums (ARIA)	64
Canada Top Albums/CDs (RPM)	78
US Billboard 200	22

== Certifications ==
Region	Certification	Certified units/sales
United States (RIAA)	2× Platinum	2,000,000^{^}
^{^} Shipments figures based on certification alone.
