= Don Saliers =

American theologian

Don E. Saliers (born 1937) is an American theologian specializing in homiletics and liturgics. He was the William R. Cannon Distinguished Professor of Theology and Worship at the Candler School of Theology of Emory University in Atlanta, Georgia. Although he retired from Candler in 2007, Professor Saliers returned to Candler as Theologian-in-Residence in 2015.

== Education ==
Saliers received his Bachelor of Arts degree from Ohio Wesleyan University, and both his Bachelor of Divinity and his Doctor of Philosophy degrees from Yale University. He also attended the University of Cambridge.

== Career ==
He is a musician, theologian, and scholar of liturgics. Among the instruments he plays are the organ and the piano He is also a United Methodist pastor and a poet.

Saliers joined the Emory University faculty in 1974. He was the William R. Cannon Distinguished Professor of Theology and Worship at the Candler School of Theology at Emory University. Although he retired in 2007, he is currently Theologian-in-Residence and a professor emeritus. In addition to teaching theology and worship, he directed the master of sacred music program there. He has also taught at Notre Dame, St. John's University, Vancouver School of Theology, and Boston College.

Among the fifteen books Saliers has written, are several on the relationship between theology and worship practices. He also co-authored A Song to Sing, a Life to Live with his daughter Emily Saliers, a member of the folk-rock music duo Indigo Girls. Among the places the two have performed and spoken publicly are a United Methodist Women's convention in Anaheim, California in May 2006, the Washington National Cathedral in 2007, and a United Methodist Board of Church and Society reception in 2016.

Saliers has served as president of the North American Academy of Liturgy and the Society for the Study of Christian Spirituality. He is a chaplain to the American Guild of Organists.

== Personal life ==
Don Saliers and his wife Jane (née Firmin; a retired librarian) have four daughters, including Emily Saliers, a musician who is one half of the folk duo Indigo Girls. They have resided in the metro Atlanta area for over 40 years. He has five grandchildren. Don Saliers currently serves as a house chaplain for the Candler Formation Community Program.

A music room at Emory University's Schwartz Center for Performing Arts was named for Don and Jane Saliers and partly funded by their daughter Emily.
