= Lung of Love =

Studio album by Amy Ray
- Released: February 28, 2012
- Studios: Greg Griffith's studio, Greensboro, North Carolina, United States
- Genres: Americana, folk rock
- Length: 31:30
- Language: English
- Label: Daemon
- Producer: Greg Griffith

Amy Ray chronology
MVP Live (2010)	Lung of Love (2012)	Goodnight Tender (2014)

Lung of Love is the fourth studio album (and sixth overall) from American folk rock singer-songwriter Amy Ray, released on Daemon Records on February 28, 2012. It has received positive reviews from critics.

== Reception ==
Lung of Love received positive reviews from critics noted at review aggregator Metacritic. It has a weighted average score of 74 out of 100, based on four reviews. Editors at AllMusic Guide scored this release 3.5 out of five stars, with critic Thom Jurek noting Ray's shift to Americana, paired with music that is "tight and declamatory". Writing for American Songwriter, Kenny Herzog rated this release 3.5 out of five stars, praising the collaborations on the album, but writing that it came together with "great passion and immediacy, but not much belaboring over sequencing and synchronicity". Megan Troper of PopMatters scored this album a seven out of 10, characterizing the music as sounding like a "new, slightly offbeat Indigo Girls record, and this is anything but surprising". In Glide Magazine, Peter Zimmerman rated Lung of Love an eight out of 10, noting that there are many stand-out tracks that are among the best in Ray's 25-year career, but that one or two feel "phoned-in".

== Track listing ==
All songs written by Amy Ray, except where noted

1. "When You're Gone, You're Gone" (Greg Griffith and Ray) – 3:16
2. "Glow" – 1:56
3. "I Didn't" – 4:06
4. "From Haiti" (Griffith and Ray) – 3:10
5. "Crying in the Wilderness" – 2:53
6. "Little Revolution" (Griffith and Ray) – 2:51
7. "The Rock Is My Foundation" – 3:14
8. "Lung of Love" (Griffith and Ray) – 3:40
9. "Give It a Go" – 2:47
10. "Bird in the Hand" – 3:40

Digital edition bonus tracks

11. "This Train (Revised)" (live at Empty Sea) – 3:54
12. "The Rock Is My Foundation" (live at Empty Sea) – 2:29

== Personnel ==
- Amy Ray – vocals; acoustic guitar on "When You're Gone, You're Gone" and "I Didn't"; electric guitar on "Glow", "From Haiti", "Crying in the Wilderness", "Little Revolution", "Lung of Love", "Give It a Go", and "Bird in the Hand"; mandolin on "The Rock Is My Foundation", photography
- Brandi Carlile – backing vocals on "When You're Gone, You're Gone" and "I Didn't", vocals on "The Rock Is My Foundation" and "Bird in the Hand"
- Mark Chalecki – mastering at Little Red Book Mastering in Los Angeles, California, United States
- Thom Canova – recording
- Lindsay Fuller – backing vocals on "When You're Gone, You're Gone", "I Didn't"
- Greg Griffith – acoustic guitar on "I Didn't", "From Haiti", and "Bird in the Hand"; bass guitar on "When You're Gone, You're Gone", "Glow", "From Haiti", "Crying in the Wilderness", "Little Revolution", "Give It a Go", "Lung of Love", and "Bird in the Hand"; electric guitar on "I Didn't", "Give It a Go", "Crying in the Wilderness", "The Rock Is My Foundation", "Lung of Love", and "Bird in the Hand"; lap steel guitar on "When You're Gone, You're Gone"; slide guitar on "Crying in the Wilderness"; farfisa on "Little Revolution"; bass synthesizer on "I Didn't"; percussion on "Lung of Love"; engineering; production
- Jon Griffin – cello recording
- Bobby Kelly – bass guitar on "The Rock Is My Foundation"
- Dom Kelly – backing vocals on "When You're Gone, You're Gone", "From Haiti", and "Crying in the Wilderness"
- Erza Kelly – percussion on "Glow", "I Didn't", and "The Rock Is My Foundation"; brushes on "I Didn't"; drums on "The Rock Is My Foundation"
- Sean Kelly – backing vocals on "When You're Gone, You're Gone", "From Haiti", and "Crying in the Wilderness"
- Scott Manring – banjo on "Crying in the Wilderness", dobro on "The Rock Is My Foundation" and "Bird in the Hand"
- Heather McEntire – backing vocals on "I Didn't" and "From Haiti"
- Giovanna Moraga-Clayton – cello on "Bird in the Hand"
- Denise Plumb – design
- Laurie S. Ray – illustration
- Trina Shoemaker – mixing
- Jason Staczek – recording for Brandi Carlile
- Kaia Wilson – electric guitar on "Glow", "From Haiti", "Crying in the Wilderness", and "Little Revolution"; backing vocals on "Glow"; vocals on "From Haiti"; synthesizer on "Give It a Go"
- Julie Wolf – piano on "When You're Gone, You're Gone" and "From Haiti"; Rhodes piano on "When You're Gone, You're Gone", "Glow", "Crying in the Wilderness", and "Bird in the Hand"; farfisa on "Glow", "Little Revolution", and "Lung of Love"; Moog synthesizer on "Glow" and "From Haiti"; electric piano on "From Haiti"; background vocals on "Glow" and "From Haiti"; Wurlitzer electric pianoon "I Didn't"
- Yim Yames – backing vocals on "When You're Gone, You're Gone"
- Melissa York – drums on all tracks except "The Rock Is My Foundation", backing vocals on "From Haiti"

== See also ==
- List of 2012 albums
