= Galileo (song) =

Single by Indigo Girls

from the album Rites of Passage
- Released: 1992
- Recorded: 1992, Bearsville Studios, Woodstock, New York
- Genre: Folk rock, world
- Length: 4:12
- Label: Epic
- Songwriter: Emily Saliers
- Producer: Peter Collins

Indigo Girls singles chronology
"Hammer and Nail" (1990)	"Galileo" (1992)	"Ghost" (1992)

"Galileo" is a song written by Emily Saliers and recorded and performed by American folk rock group the Indigo Girls. It was released in 1992 on their platinum-selling fourth studio album, Rites of Passage (1992). It reached number 10 on the US Billboard Modern Rock Tracks chart, the first song by the Indigo Girls to break the top ten on any chart. And it also peaked at numbers 81 and 89 on the Cash Box Top 100 and Billboard Hot 100 charts.

The song is about reincarnation, partially through the lens of the story of Galileo Galilei, the 17th century physicist, mathematician, astronomer, and philosopher who played a major role in the Scientific Revolution. The song's chorus invokes both existential angst and Galileo's genius with "How long till my soul gets it right/Can any human being ever reach the highest light/I call on the resting soul of Galileo/King of night vision, king of insight", referencing both the clarity of physical vision made possible through his modernizations of the telescope and his support of Copernicanism, which stated that the Sun, rather than the Earth, was the center of the universe. The song has frequently closed concerts since its premiere in 1992.

== Charts ==
Chart (1992)	Peak Position
Australia (ARIA)	130
UK Singles (OCC)	86
US Billboard Hot 100	89
US Modern Rock Tracks (Billboard)	10
US Cash Box Top 100	81
