= Amy Ray =

American singer-songwriter (born 1964)

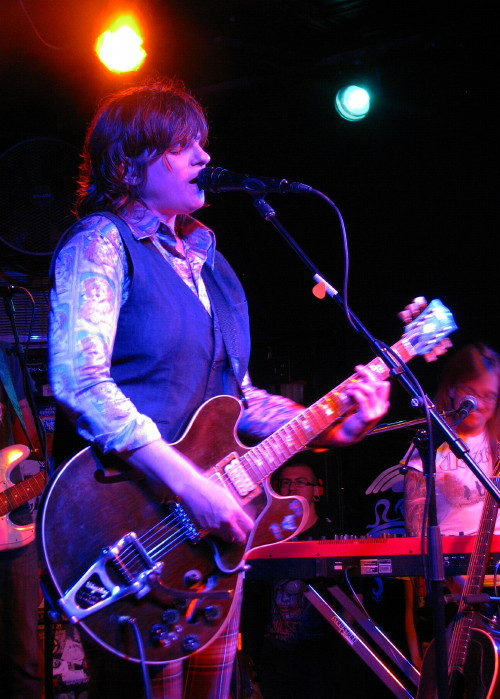
- Ray performing in Asbury Park, New Jersey in 2012

Background information
- Born: Amy Elizabeth Ray; April 12, 1964 (age 62); Decatur, Georgia, U.S.
- Origin: Georgia, U.S.
- Genres: Folk rock
- Occupations: Singer-songwriter; record producer
- Instruments: Vocals; acoustic guitar; electric guitar; mandolin; harmonica
- Years active: 1985–present
- Labels: Daemon; Epic; Hollywood; Vanguard
- Member of: Indigo Girls
- Website: www.amy-ray.com

Amy Elizabeth Ray (born April 12, 1964) is an American singer-songwriter and member of the contemporary folk duo Indigo Girls with Emily Saliers. She also pursues a solo career, releasing ten albums under her own name, and founded the independent label Daemon Records in 1989. Ray is known for her alto and tenor range, and plays both electric and acoustic guitar, as well as mandolin and harmonica.

== Biography ==
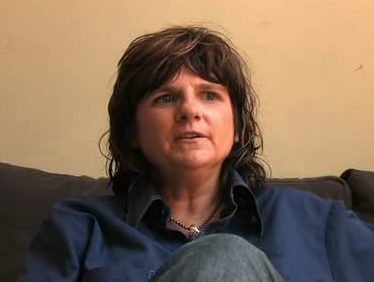
Ray in 2008

Born in Decatur, Georgia, Amy Ray met Emily Saliers when they both attended the same elementary school. They began performing together and recorded a demo in 1981. After graduation, Ray and Saliers went to different colleges with Ray attending Vanderbilt University. By 1985, they had both transferred to Emory University in Atlanta and formed the Indigo Girls. In 1986, Ray graduated from Emory with majors in English and Religion.

In March 2001, Ray released her first solo album, Stag, a southern and punk rock album. The Butchies, a punk band whose members include Kaia Wilson, Melissa York, and Alison Martlew, provided support for five songs, and Joan Jett played on "Hey Castrator". In April 2005, Ray released the softer edged Prom, and in December 2006, she released Live from Knoxville. Her fourth solo album, the melodic Didn't It Feel Kinder, was released in August 2008. Lung of Love, which has more of an indie-rock sound, was released in 2012.

Her backup band for her Stag tour was The Butchies. In 2004, when she embarked on her Prom tour, she brought Les Nuby (guitar), Will Lochamy (drums), and Jody Bleyle (bass). Tara Jane O'Neil replaced Bleyle when she began maternity leave in October. Ray's backup band for her 2012 Lung of Love tour was The Butchies. Jenn Stone, former keyboard player for Kesha, also performed on the tour.

== Side projects ==
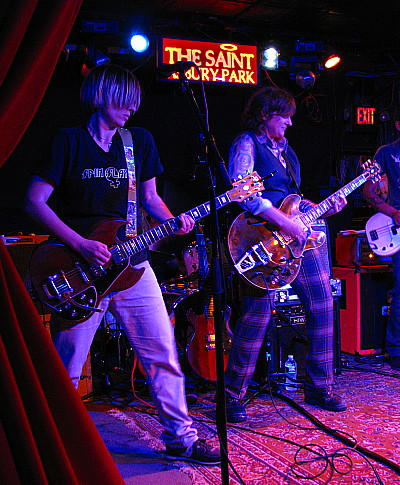
Kaia Wilson and Ray on stage in 2012

In addition to the Indigo Girls and her work as a solo artist, Ray also runs an independent record label, Daemon Records, which she founded in 1990 and which is based in Decatur, Georgia. Some performers signed to Daemon include Girlyman, Magnapop, Nineteen Forty-Five, Michelle Malone, Three Finger Cowboy, Danielle Howle and the Tantrums, Gerard McHugh, New Mongrels, Grady Cousins, The Oblivious, Snow Machine, Utah Phillips and Rose Polenzani.

She often collaborates with The Butchies, a punk band featuring drummer Melissa York and vocalist/guitarist Kaia Wilson. She has contributed the live track "Lucy Stoners" on Calling All Kings & Queens (2001) and the Mr. Lady Records sampler album as well as a live recording of "On Your Honor" on a compilation for Home Alive.

Ray is also an activist involved in multiple political and social causes, including gay rights, low-power broadcasting, women's rights, indigenous struggles, gun control, environmental protection and the anti-death penalty movement among others. She has made several trips to Chiapas, Mexico to support the Zapatista Army of National Liberation.

In 1993, she and Emily Saliers co-founded Honor the Earth with Winona LaDuke. Honor the Earth's mission is "to create awareness and support for Native [American] environmental issues and to develop needed financial and political resources for the survival of sustainable Native [American] communities. Honor the Earth develops these resources by using music, the arts, the media, and indigenous wisdom to ask people to recognize our joint dependency on the Earth and be a voice for those not heard."

Justin Vernon (Bon Iver) appears on her 2014 album Goodnight Tender, and she and Vernon continue to maintain a friendship.

Ray was also a judge for the 3rd and 11th Annual Independent Music Awards to support independent artists' careers.

== Personal life ==
Ray uses she/her pronouns and is a lesbian. Ray lives in the foothills of North Georgia with her partner, Carrie Schrader, and their child. In March 2021, Ray spoke on the LGBTQ&A podcast about having gender dysphoria and being genderqueer.

Ray identifies as "religious" and a "Pagan Christian".

== Discography ==
=== Studio albums ===
- Stag (2001)
- Prom (2005)
- Didn't It Feel Kinder (2008)
- Lung of Love (2012)
- Goodnight Tender (2014)
- Holler (2018)
- If It All Goes South (2022)

=== Live albums ===
- Live from Knoxville (2006)
- MVP Live (2010)
- The Tender Hour: Amy Ray Live from Seattle (2015)
