= Emily Saliers =

American musician (born 1963)

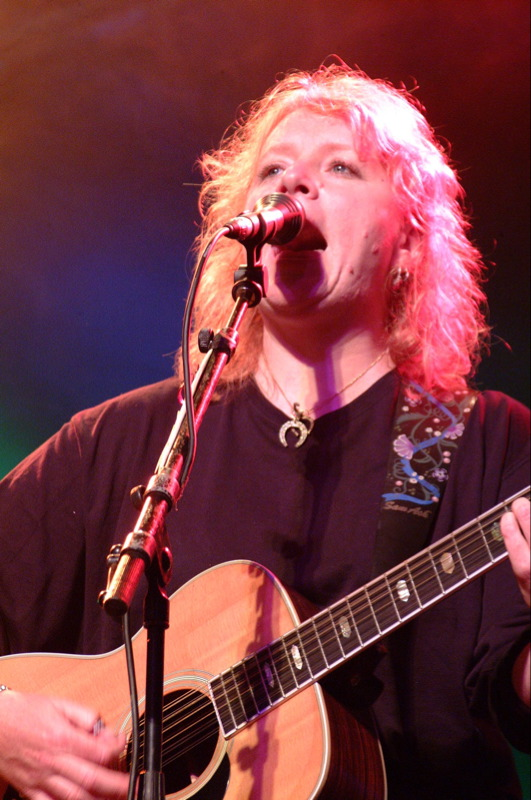
- Saliers performing in 2002

Background information
- Born: July 22, 1963 (age 62); New Haven, Connecticut, U.S.
- Origin: Atlanta, Georgia, U.S.
- Genres: Folk rock, folk
- Occupations: Singer-songwriter, musician
- Instruments: Vocals; guitar; mandolin; ukulele; banjo; bouzouki
- Years active: 1985–present
- Label: IG Records
- Member of: Indigo Girls
- Website: emilysaliers.com

Emily Ann Saliers (born July 22, 1963) is an American singer-songwriter and member of the musical duo Indigo Girls. Saliers sings soprano and plays lead guitar as well as banjo, piano, mandolin, ukulele, bouzouki and many other instruments.

== Early life and education ==
Saliers was born in New Haven, Connecticut, as the second eldest of four daughters to Don and Jane Saliers (née Firmin), a librarian. Since approximately age 11, she was raised in Decatur, Georgia (in Metro Atlanta).

Emily attended Laurel Ridge Elementary School in Decatur, Georgia. She later attended Shamrock High School, which she did not like. She began her college education at Tulane University but transferred to Emory University, graduating in 1985 with a bachelor's degree in English.

== Musical career ==
=== Indigo Girls ===
Saliers first met her future Indigo Girls bandmate Amy Ray when they were students at Laurel Ridge Elementary School in Decatur, Georgia. As students at Shamrock High School, they started performing music together at talent shows and local venues (including bars when she was still under age) under the band names of "Saliers & Ray" and the "B-Band". When Saliers (the elder of the duo) left Georgia for college in Louisiana, Ray frequently visited her. They would play together for tips in New Orleans' French Quarter. Saliers and Ray eventually reunited when they transferred from their respective colleges to Emory University. At Emory they settled upon the band name Indigo Girls; Ray came across the word indigo in the dictionary and "thought it sounded cool".

=== Performing as Emily Saliers ===
In 2004, Saliers composed her first film score for the independent short film, One Weekend a Month. She occasionally performs solo at benefit shows or as a guest with friends' bands. She and her father Don Saliers performed together once at the Washington National Cathedral in 2007.

In 2014, she began working on her first solo album, Murmuration Nation, which was released on August 11, 2017 and was produced by longtime friend and Juilliard-trained violin player for Indigo Girls, Lyris Hung. The album was recorded in New York City and engineered by Ryan Kelly and Tom Morello. Appearing with Saliers are drummers Robert "Sput" Searight and Will Calhoun, bassist Tim Lefebvre, and keyboardist Rachel Eckroth, along with guest vocalists Jonatha Brooke, Jennifer Nettles, and Lucy Wainwright Roche.

== Non-performance career ==
Saliers was a co-owner of Watershed, a restaurant in Atlanta, Georgia, from its founding until she sold her share in April 2018. Emily was one of the initial investors in the Flying Biscuit Cafe. She was a co-founder of the (now-defunct) Common Pond environmental gift shop in Atlanta, Georgia.

Saliers has co-written a book with her father, Don Saliers, a retired theology professor at Candler School of Theology at Emory University, called A Song to Sing, a Life to Live: Reflections on Music as Spiritual Practice. Emily and her father attended book signings and church appearances around the US in support of the book, including the National Cathedral in Washington, D.C. in May 2005 and October 2007.

== Personal life ==
Saliers married her longtime girlfriend, former Indigo Girls tour manager Tristin Chipman, at New York City Hall on August 20, 2013. The couple have a daughter, born in November 2012.

Saliers had a passion for wine collecting, with a wine cellar that was reported to be at 2,000 bottles, but in 2015 she announced that she had given up drinking. She has since disclosed that she became sober in 2011, calling it her "biggest challenge."

Saliers assisted in funding a music room at Emory University's Schwartz Center for Performing Arts which was named for her parents Don and Jane Saliers.

On April 17, 2026, in a social media video, Saliers said that she had been diagnosed with cervical dystonia torticollis, and essential tremor. Both of them make it difficult for her to hold a straight tone while singing.
