= 1991 in music =

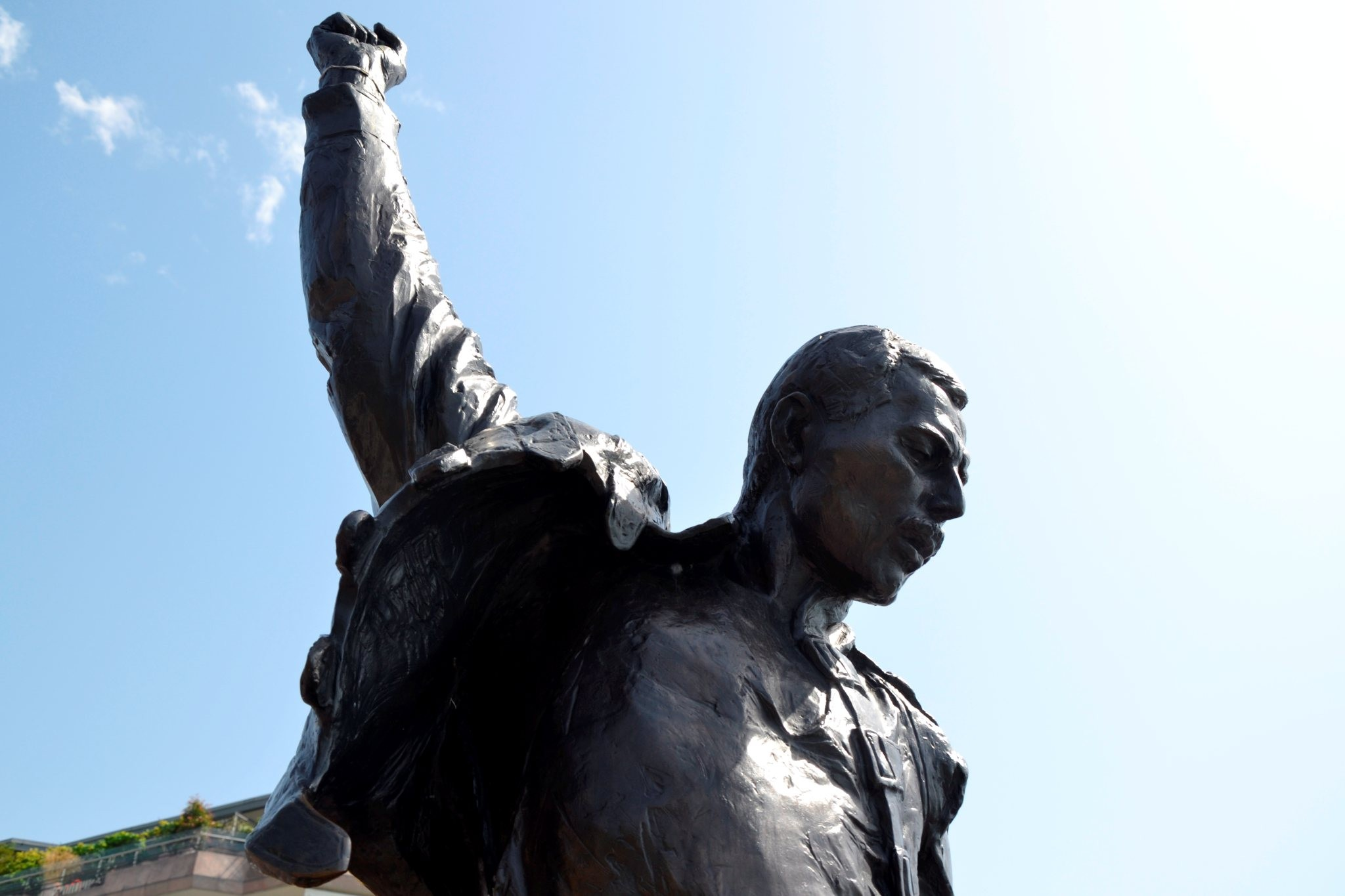
Freddie Mercury dies of AIDS

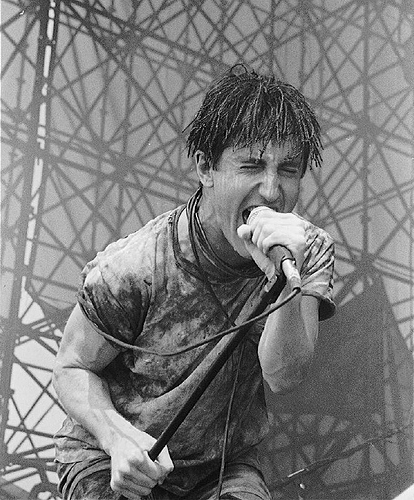
Trent Reznor at Lollapalooza 1991.

This is a list of notable events in music that took place in the year 1991.

== Specific locations ==
- 1991 in British music
- 1991 in Norwegian music
- 1991 in Scandinavian music
- 1991 in South Korean music

== Specific genres ==
- 1991 in country music
- 1991 in heavy metal music
- 1991 in hip-hop
- 1991 in Latin music
- 1991 in jazz
- 1991 in progressive rock

== Events ==
=== Summary ===
Although the year 1991 is the year that grunge music made its popular breakthrough, heavy metal was still the dominant form of rock music for the year. Therefore, Nirvana's Nevermind, led by the surprise hit single "Smells Like Teen Spirit", was not the most popular U.S. album of the year. The most popular album was Metallica's self-titled "black album". Nirvana's success was eventually followed by other grunge bands like Pearl Jam, Soundgarden, Alice in Chains, and Stone Temple Pilots, as grunge climbed the U.S. charts for the next few years. Its success eventually ended the reign of the glam metal and other hard rock groups that enjoyed massive success in the 1980s like Mötley Crüe, Poison, Warrant, Cinderella, and Ratt, whose sales were still going strong by 1991. Also during the year, the rock band Guns N' Roses's popularity flourished with the release of their albums Use Your Illusion I & Use Your Illusion II, both selling over 15 million copies total. Def Leppard's next album Adrenalize, released in March 1992, would go on to reach multi-platinum status and prove to be the last major commercial success for 1980s hair metal. A Tribe Called Quest's Low End Theory is released this year; it would go on to be considered one of the best hip-hop albums of the 1990s. A Tribe Called Quest, along with De La Soul, Dream Warriors, Gang Starr and the Poor Righteous Teachers, help define what comes to be known as alternative rap with important releases this year.

On November 24, the death of Freddie Mercury, who had confirmed to the press that he had AIDS only a day before his death, came as a shock to millions of fans and the music industry. The remaining members of Queen formed the Mercury Phoenix Trust and the following year, a tribute concert would be staged in Wembley Stadium, in front of a sell-out crowd. Queen's "Bohemian Rhapsody" (released as a double A-side with "These Are the Days of Our Lives") went to number one for the second time in the U.K.. It is also the only time a single has gone to number one more than once on the UK Christmas charts.

During the year, Billboard started using Nielsen SoundScan for its sales source for the music charts. Nielsen SoundScan began tracking sales data for Nielsen on 1 March 1991. The 25 May issue of Billboard published Billboard 200 and Country Album charts based on SoundScan "piece count data," and the first Hot 100 chart to debut with the system was released on 30 November 1991. Previously, Billboard tracked sales by calling stores across the U.S. and asking about sales – a method that was inherently error-prone and open to outright fraud. Indeed, while transitioning from the calling to tracking methods, the airplay and sales charts (already monitored by Nielsen) and the Hot 100 (then still using the calling system) often did not match (for instance Paula Abdul's "Promise of a New Day" and Roxette's "Fading Like a Flower" reached much higher Hot 100 peaks than their actual sales and airplay would have allowed them to). Although most record company executives conceded that the new method was far more accurate than the old, the chart's volatility and its geographical balance initially caused deep concern, before the change and the market shifts it brought about were accepted across the industry. Tower Records, the country's second-largest retail chain, was originally not included in the sample because its stores are equipped with different technology to measure sales. At first, some industry executives complained that the new system – which relied on high-tech sales measurement rather than store employee estimates – was based on an inadequate sample, one that favored established and mainstream acts over newcomers.

1991 was also the year CCM, or contemporary Christian music, reached a new peak. Amy Grant, who had already crossed back and forth between CCM and Contemporary Pop in the mid-80s, achieved her first solo No. 1 hit on the pop charts with the hit single "Baby Baby", becoming the first single by a CCM artist to reach No. 1 (despite the fact the song was a pop song and was void of any Christian references). Another single, "That's What Love Is For", would also top the charts, this time in the Adult Contemporary field. Meanwhile, Grant's album Heart In Motion reaches No. 11 on the pop chart and No. 1 on the Christian chart despite its non-religious objective, and quickly becomes a best-seller. Another CCM crossover artist in 1991 is Michael W. Smith, who achieves a Top Ten pop hit with his single "Place In This World". The subsequent album, Go West Young Man, is also a hit. Jon Gibson's hit "Jesus Loves Ya" still holds the record as the longest playing hit single in Christian music history. The track spent eleven weeks at No. 1 and became the top selling CCM single of 1991. Only three artists received more airplay on Christian radio stations in that year other than Gibson; Amy Grant, Michael W. Smith and BeBe & CeCe Winans.

The massive success of Garth Brooks in this year set the stage for the mid-1990s influx of pop-oriented country musicians. Several soon-to-be pivotal bands formed or released debut recordings, including Dave Matthews Band, Live, Phish, Spin Doctors and stoner metal (Kyuss, Sleep, The Obsessed). Massive Attack's Blue Lines, pioneered the sound that would eventually become known as trip hop. Entombed's Clandestine and Dismember's Like an Ever Flowing Stream were early releases from the Scandinavian metal scene. In the US, New York death metal band Suffocation released their debut full-length Effigy of the Forgotten, often considered one of the most influential of extreme metal albums. Trance music rose to prominence in the underground dance scene of Frankfurt, Germany, pioneered by such producers as Dance 2 Trance and Resistance D. U2 released their seventh album Achtung Baby, considered by many of their fans to be their best. Metallica's self-titled album was their most commercially successful, and the Red Hot Chili Peppers broke through to the mainstream with Blood Sugar Sex Magik. R.E.M. released their massive commercial breakthrough album Out of Time.

=== January–March ===
- 8 January – Def Leppard guitarist Steve Clark dies of respiratory failure from a lethal mixture of alcohol and prescription drugs. He was 30 years old.
- 15 January – An all-star rendition of the John Lennon song "Give Peace a Chance" is released, featuring Yoko Ono, Lenny Kravitz, Peter Gabriel, Alannah Myles and Tom Petty, Bonnie Raitt, billed as "The Peace Choir". The single was rushed to market in response to the imminent Gulf War.
- 16 January – The sixth annual Rock and Roll Hall of Fame induction ceremony is held in New York. The event goes forward despite a tense atmosphere caused by the US President's announcement of the Gulf War the same evening. The inductees are Ike & Tina Turner, Jimmy Reed, John Lee Hooker, LaVern Baker, The Byrds, The Impressions, Wilson Pickett and Howlin' Wolf.
- 18 January – Three people are crushed to death during an AC/DC concert in Salt Lake City, Utah, United States, when audience members rush the stage.
- 18–27 January – The nine-day festival Rock in Rio II is held in Rio de Janeiro, Brazil. The headliners are a-ha, Prince, INXS, Guns N' Roses, New Kids on the Block, George Michael and Happy Mondays.
- 19 January – Janet Jackson with the seventh single from Janet Jackson's Rhythm Nation 1814, "Love Will Never Do (Without You)", becomes the only artist to have seven singles from the same album chart in the top five.
- 27 January – Whitney Houston sings "The Star-Spangled Banner" at the Super Bowl. The recording is then released in the United States and becomes a hit single.
- 31 January – DJ Magazine is launched under its new name.
- 4 February – Queen release their final album of Freddie Mercury's lifetime, entitled Innuendo. This album includes the singles "The Show Must Go On", "Headlong", "These Are The Days Of Our Lives" and "Innuendo".
- 20 February – The 33rd Annual Grammy Awards are presented in New York, hosted by Garry Shandling. Quincy Jones' Back on the Block wins Album of the Year, Phil Collins' "Another Day in Paradise" wins Record of the Year and Bette Midler's version of "From a Distance" wins Song of the Year. Mariah Carey wins Best New Artist.
- 27 February – James Brown is granted an early parole and released from jail, following his arrest after a high-speed car chase through two states in 1989. Pop Will Eat Itself document the affair with their song, "Not Now James, We're Busy".
- 28 February – Hollywood's Record Plant Studios recording studio closes down. Among the albums recorded at the Record Plant were The Eagles' Hotel California, Fleetwood Mac's Rumours and Stevie Wonder's Songs in the Key of Life.
- 1 March – Nielsen SoundScan begins tracking sales data for Nielsen.
- 11 March – Janet Jackson signs a US$30 million contract with Virgin Records, making her the highest paid female recording artist ever.
- 12 March – R.E.M. release their seventh studio album, Out of Time. The album would serve as the band's breakthrough, catapulting the Georgia alternative rock band from cult status to an international act.
- 16 March – Seven members of country music singer Reba McEntire's band and her road manager are killed when their private plane crashes in California, near the U.S.-Mexico border. McEntire travels on a separate plane. The disaster inspires the title song of her next album, For My Broken Heart.
- 20 March
  - Michael Jackson signs a contract with Sony for 1 billion dollars.
  - Eric Clapton's four-year-old son, Conor, dies after falling 49 stories from a New York City apartment window; the event later inspires Clapton to write the hit single "Tears in Heaven".
- 24 March – The Black Crowes are dropped as the opening act of ZZ Top's tour for repeatedly insulting the tour's sponsor, Miller Beer.
- 27 March – New Kids on the Block star Donnie Wahlberg is arrested in Louisville, Kentucky for allegedly setting his hotel room on fire.
- 28 March – George Harrison, Phil Collins and others attend funeral services for Eric Clapton's late son, Conor.

=== April–June ===
- 17 April – Nirvana perform "Smells Like Teen Spirit" live for the first time at the OK Hotel in Seattle, Washington.
- 28 April – Bonnie Raitt marries actor Michael O'Keefe in New York.
- 4 May – The Eurovision Song Contest 1991 is held in Rome, Italy, and Sweden's "Fångad av en stormvind" by Carola is declared the winner.
- 7 May – In Macon, Georgia, a judge dismisses a wrongful death lawsuit against Ozzy Osbourne. The suit was filed by a local couple that believed their son was inspired to attempt suicide by Osbourne's music.
- 10 May – Truth or Dare, a documentary chronicling singer Madonna's 1990 Blond Ambition Tour, is released to theatres.
- 24 May – Guns N' Roses kick off their 26-month world Use Your Illusion Tour in Alpine Valley in East Troy.
- 25 May – The Billboard 200 album chart starts incorporating electronically monitored sales data provided by Nielsen SoundScan.
- 28 May – The Smashing Pumpkins release their debut album Gish.
- 7 June – The American Broadcasting Company revives the late-night rock performance series In Concert.
- 21 June – The Mérida State Symphony Orchestra is founded in Venezuela.
- 28 June – Paul McCartney's classical composition, the Liverpool Oratorio, receives its premiere at the Liverpool Anglican Cathedral.

=== July–September ===
- 2 July
  - Launch of the Australian Festival of Chamber Music.
  - Hollywood Bowl Orchestra gives its first public performance.
  - During the Use Your Illusion Tour, Axl Rose assaults a member of the audience watching the show on camera, after security fails to respond to the singer's orders to confiscate the camera. After the attack, Rose angrily says, "Thanks to the lame-ass security, I'm goin' home!" and storms off the stage.
- 13 July – Pianist Keith Jarrett records his Vienna Concert at the Vienna Staatsoper.
- 18 July – Perry Farrell launches the first Lollapalooza tour as a farewell for his just-dissolved band, Jane's Addiction. Other acts appearing on the tour include Siouxsie and the Banshees, Nine Inch Nails, Rollins Band, Fishbone and Rage Against the Machine.
- 12 August – Metallica release their most successful album, Metallica (also called "The Black Album"). Something of a departure from the thrash metal sound they helped pioneer, it becomes one of the best-selling albums of all time
- 15 August – Paul Simon's Concert in the Park takes place in Central Park. The free concert is broadcast live on HBO.
- 20 August – The six-day International Pop Underground Convention opens in Olympia, Washington.
- 27 August
  - Dr. Dre pleads no contest to charges that he beat up a woman at a West Hollywood nightclub and is sentenced to 24 months probation.
  - Pearl Jam release their debut album, Ten. While initially slow to sell, it reaches No. 2 on the Billboard charts within a year and is subsequently certified thirteen times Platinum in the United States.
- 10 September – Nirvana releases the single for "Smells Like Teen Spirit"
- 17 September – Rock band Guns N' Roses release their first full-length follow up to their debut album Appetite for Destruction in the form of the double album Use Your Illusion I & Use Your Illusion II. Both go on to sell a combined excess of 1.3 million on their first week of sale in the US alone.
- 23 September
  - Primal Scream releases Screamadelica, which would go on to win the first Mercury Prize in 1992.
  - The TV series Baywatch begins its second season with a new theme song performed and co-written by former Survivor member Jimi Jamison, "I'm Always Here".
  - Bryan Adams releases his sixth album Waking Up the Neighbours produced by Mutt Lange, achieving diamond status in his native Canada for the second time.
- 24 September – Retrospectively considered by critics to be a seminal date in music history, as it sees the release of several key albums:
  - Nevermind, the sophomore album from Seattle-based band Nirvana, which will go on to popularize the grunge movement.
  - The Low End Theory, the sophomore album from hip-hop group A Tribe Called Quest.
  - Blood Sugar Sex Magik, the fifth album from funk rock band the Red Hot Chili Peppers, which, alongside Nevermind, also helps to popularize alternative rock.
  - Trompe le Monde, the fourth album from alternative rock band the Pixies, their last before their breakup two years later. It will be the band's final full-length LP for 22 years.

=== October–December ===
- 8 October – Soundgarden releases their breakout album Badmotorfinger.
- 3 November – A free tribute concert is held at Golden Gate Park in memory of concert promoter Bill Graham, killed in a helicopter crash three weeks earlier at the age of 60. Performers include Santana, Grateful Dead, Journey and Crosby, Stills, Nash & Young.
- 7 November
  - Bryan Adams's 16-week stay at the top of the UK Singles Chart with "Everything I Do (I Do It For You)" is finally ended by U2 single "The Fly", having already set a new record for the longest consecutive stay at the top of the UK Singles Chart.
  - Izzy Stradlin quits Guns N' Roses.
  - Frank Zappa's children, Dweezil and Moon, announce to an audience in New York that their father is unable to attend the tribute concert to his music because he is seriously ill with prostate cancer.
- 12 November – Genesis release the album We Can't Dance in the United States.
- 14 November – The new Michael Jackson music video "Black or White" premieres simultaneously in 27 countries to an audience of 500 million people. Controversy is immediately generated by the video's last four minutes in which Jackson smashes windows, vandalizes a car and causes a building to explode, as well as suggestively grabs his crotch repeatedly while dancing.
- 19 November
  - U2 release the album Achtung Baby in the United States.
  - Luis Miguel releases Romance which revitalizes the popularity of boleros in the 1990s.
- 24 November – Freddie Mercury, lead singer of Queen, dies from AIDS-related complications at the age of 45, one day after making the disease public, in London. The same day, Eric Carr, formerly of Kiss, also dies from complications of heart cancer, in New York.
- 26 November – Michael Jackson releases his worldwide hit album Dangerous. It comes four years after Bad and goes on to sell more than 32 million copies worldwide.
- 30 November – Following in the steps of the Billboard 200, the Billboard Hot 100 also begins a new era by incorporating and merging electronically measured sales and airplay data from SoundScan and BDS respectively.
- 1 December
  - A Carnegie Hall Christmas Concert, featuring Kathleen Battle and Frederica von Stade, a jazz band led by Wynton Marsalis, and orchestra and chorus conducted by André Previn, is recorded for television.
  - George Harrison plays Yokohama, Japan. The brief Japanese tour with Eric Clapton marks his first set of formal concert performances since 1974.
- 4 December – The Judds give their final concert performance as a duo.
- 14 December - The 20th OTI Festival, held at the Centroŵ de Convenciones in Acapulco, Mexico, is won by the song "¿Adónde estás ahora?", written by Claudia Brant and Sebastián Schon, and performed by Brant herself representing Argentina.
- 17 December - Judge Kevin Thomas Duffy rules, in singer-songwriter Gilbert O'Sullivan's lawsuit against rapper Biz Markie, that all future samples must be cleared.
- 31 December – The twentieth annual New Year's Rockin' Eve special airs on ABC, with appearances by Boyz II Men, Simply Red, Vanessa L. Williams, Another Bad Creation, Restless Heart, Michael Bivins and Barry Manilow.

=== Also in 1991 ===
- Aerosmith sign a new deal with Sony Music worth an estimated $30 million.
- The Rolling Stones sign a new contract with Virgin Records.
- Country music legend Kenny Rogers starts his restaurant chain, Kenny Rogers Roasters.
- Tupac Shakur's solo career begins with his first album, 2Pacalypse Now.
- Approximate date – Mangue Bit is originated in Recife, Brazil.

== Bands formed ==
- See Musical groups established in 1991

== Bands disbanded ==
- See Musical groups disestablished in 1991

== Bands reformed ==
- See Musical groups reestablished in 1991

== Albums released ==
=== January–March ===
Date		Album	Artist	Notes
J A N U A R Y	1	Industrial	Pitchshifter	Debut
J A N U A R Y	8	Back from Rio	Roger McGuinn	-
J A N U A R Y	8	Fly Me Courageous	Drivin N Cryin	-
J A N U A R Y	14	Soulside Journey	Darkthrone	Debut
J A N U A R Y	14	Solid Ball of Rock	Saxon	-
J A N U A R Y	15	8 Track Stomp	Chickasaw Mudd Puppies	-
J A N U A R Y	15	A Little Ain't Enough	David Lee Roth	-
J A N U A R Y	15	Quik Is the Name	DJ Quik	Debut
J A N U A R Y	15	Step In the Arena	Gang Starr	-
J A N U A R Y	15	This Is an EP Release	Digital Underground	-
J A N U A R Y	16	2nd Wind	Todd Rundgren	-
J A N U A R Y	21	1916	Motörhead	-
J A N U A R Y	21	The Soul Cages	Sting	-
J A N U A R Y	22	You've Got to Stand for Something	Aaron Tippin	-
J A N U A R Y	24	Tyranny (For You)	Front 242	-
J A N U A R Y	25	All True Man	Alexander O'Neal	-
J A N U A R Y	29	Into the Light	Gloria Estefan	-
J A N U A R Y	29	The Singles Collection	The Specials	Compilation
J A N U A R Y	29	Native Son	Judybats	-
J A N U A R Y	29	Divinyls	Divinyls	-
J A N U A R Y	29	Doubt	Jesus Jones	-
J A N U A R Y	29	Mo' Ritmo	Gerardo	Debut
J A N U A R Y	29	Party Mix!/Mesopotamia	The B-52's	Re-issue with remixes
J A N U A R Y	29	When You're a Boy	Susanna Hoffs	-
J A N U A R Y	29	Within the Veil	Fear of God	Debut
J A N U A R Y	29	Uncle Anesthesia	Screaming Trees	-
J A N U A R Y	?	Heavenly vs. Satan	Heavenly	Debut
F E B R U A R Y	4	Innuendo	Queen	-
F E B R U A R Y	4	Everybody's Angel	Tanita Tikaram	-
F E B R U A R Y	4	War Master	Bolt Thrower	-
F E B R U A R Y	5	Blood, Sweat & No Tears	Stetsasonic	-
F E B R U A R Y	5	International Pop Overthrow	Material Issue	-
F E B R U A R Y	11	Coolin' at the Playground Ya Know!	Another Bad Creation	Debut
F E B R U A R Y	12	Marc Cohn	Marc Cohn	Debut
F E B R U A R Y	12	Saigon Kick	Saigon Kick	Debut
F E B R U A R Y	15	8-Way Santa	Tad	-
F E B R U A R Y	18	30 Something	Carter USM	-
F E B R U A R Y	18	Heaven's Open	Mike Oldfield	-
F E B R U A R Y	18	Hooked	Great White	Europe
F E B R U A R Y	18	Night Ride Home	Joni Mitchell	UK
F E B R U A R Y	19	Green Mind	Dinosaur Jr.	-
F E B R U A R Y	19	Ink	The Fixx	-
F E B R U A R Y	19	The Name Above the Title	John Wesley Harding	-
F E B R U A R Y	19	Road Apples	The Tragically Hip	-
F E B R U A R Y	19	Words from the Genius	The Genius	Debut
F E B R U A R Y	19	Young Black Teenagers	Young Black Teenagers	Debut
F E B R U A R Y	20	Lo Flux Tube	OLD	–
F E B R U A R Y	20	Piouhgd	Butthole Surfers	-
F E B R U A R Y	20	Tremolo	My Bloody Valentine	EP
F E B R U A R Y	22	The Last Days of Pompeii	Nova Mob	-
F E B R U A R Y	25	Auberge	Chris Rea	-
F E B R U A R Y	25	On the Prowl	Loudness	Self-cover album
F E B R U A R Y	25	What Evil Lurks	The Prodigy	EP
F E B R U A R Y	?	Different World	Uriah Heep	-
F E B R U A R Y	?	Frigid Stars LP	Codeine	Debut
F E B R U A R Y	?	Ophelia's Shadow	Toyah	-
F E B R U A R Y	?	Recurring	Spacemen 3	US
M A R C H	4	Kill Uncle	Morrissey	-
M A R C H	4	Ex:el	808 State	-
M A R C H	4	Peggy Suicide	Julian Cope	UK; 7 May in US; Double Album
M A R C H	4	Ray	Frazier Chorus	
M A R C H	4	The White Room	The KLF	-
M A R C H	5	Dollars & Sex	The Escape Club	-
M A R C H	5	Heart in Motion	Amy Grant	-
M A R C H	5	New Jack City	Various Artists	Soundtrack
M A R C H	5	Pocket Full of Gold	Vince Gill	-
M A R C H	5	Time for a Witness	The Feelies	-
M A R C H	5	Truly Blessed	Teddy Pendergrass	-
M A R C H	6	Extremely Live	Vanilla Ice	Live
M A R C H	12	Black and White	BoDeans	-
M A R C H	12	Chase the Clouds	Keedy	-
M A R C H	12	Freakshow	BulletBoys	-
M A R C H	12	Free	Rick Astley	-
M A R C H	12	Live Hardcore Worldwide	Boogie Down Productions	Live
M A R C H	12	Mind Funk	Mind Funk	-
M A R C H	12	Out of Time	R.E.M.	-
M A R C H	12	The Real Ramona	Throwing Muses	-
M A R C H	12	Unreal World	The Godfathers	US
M A R C H	15	Goat	The Jesus Lizard	-
M A R C H	15	Love's Secret Domain	Coil	US
M A R C H	15	The Supersonic Storybook	Urge Overkill	-
M A R C H	18	Outland	Gary Numan	–
M A R C H	18	Gothic	Paradise Lost	-
M A R C H	18	Capitol Collectors Series	Jo Stafford	-
M A R C H	18	Greatest Hits	Eurythmics	-
M A R C H	18	Strange Free World	Kitchens of Distinction	-
M A R C H	19	Bag-a-Trix	Whodini	-
M A R C H	19	Chill of an Early Fall	George Strait	-
M A R C H	19	Make Way for the Motherlode	Yo-Yo	-
M A R C H	21	Checkin' Out the Ghosts	Kim Carnes	Japan
M A R C H	25	Joyride	Roxette	-
M A R C H	25	Vagabond Heart	Rod Stewart	-
M A R C H	25	Now! That's What I Call Music 19	Various Artists	Compilation
M A R C H	26	The Bootleg Series Volumes 1–3 (Rare & Unreleased) 1961–1991	Bob Dylan	Box Set
M A R C H	26	The Human Factor	Metal Church	-
M A R C H	26	Places I Have Never Been	Willie Nile	-
M A R C H	26	Ribbed	NOFX	-
M A R C H	26	Strength	Enuff Z'nuff	-
M A R C H	26	Teenage Mutant Ninja Turtles II: The Secret of the Ooze: The Original Motion Picture Soundtrack	Various Artists	Soundtrack
M A R C H	27	Good-bye My Loneliness	Zard	-
M A R C H	27	Spiderland	Slint	-
M A R C H	?	In the Kingdom	Whitecross	-

=== April–June ===
Date		Album	Artist	Notes
A P R I L	1	God Fodder	Ned's Atomic Dustbin	Debut
A P R I L	1	King of the Jews	Oxbow	-
A P R I L	1	School of Fish	School of Fish	-
A P R I L	2	Arise	Sepultura	-
A P R I L	2	Electric Barnyard	The Kentucky Headhunters	-
A P R I L	2	Lean Into It	Mr. Big	-
A P R I L	2	Mama Said	Lenny Kravitz	-
A P R I L	2	Mane Attraction	White Lion	-
A P R I L	2	Word of Mouth	Mike + The Mechanics	-
A P R I L	8	Blue Lines	Massive Attack	Debut
A P R I L	8	Flashpoint	The Rolling Stones	Live +2 new studio tracks
A P R I L	8	Rain Tree Crow	Rain Tree Crow	Reunion album
A P R I L	8	Real Life	Simple Minds	-
A P R I L	9	The Ghosts That Haunt Me	Crash Test Dummies	-
A P R I L	9	True Love	Pat Benatar	-
A P R I L	9	L'Autre...	Mylène Farmer	-
A P R I L	9	The Ten Commandments	Malevolent Creation	-
A P R I L	9	Kinky	Hoodoo Gurus	-
A P R I L	15	Brotherhood	The Doobie Brothers	-
A P R I L	15	One from the Vault	Grateful Dead	Live
A P R I L	15	The Orb's Adventures Beyond the Ultraworld	The Orb	-
A P R I L	16	Alanis	Alanis Morissette	Debut
A P R I L	16	The Best Band You Never Heard in Your Life	Frank Zappa	2 discs; Live
A P R I L	16	LaTour	LaTour	Debut
A P R I L	16	Ripe	Banderas	US
A P R I L	16	Temple of the Dog	Temple of the Dog	-
A P R I L	16	The Way to Salvation	King Missile	-
A P R I L	21	Luna Sea	Luna Sea	Debut
A P R I L	22	Hoodoo	Alison Moyet	-
A P R I L	22	Shift-Work	The Fall	-
A P R I L	22	The Beast Inside	Inspiral Carpets	-
A P R I L	23	13 Engines	13 Engines	US
A P R I L	23	And Now the Legacy Begins	Dream Warriors	US
A P R I L	23	Flyin' the Flannel	Firehose	-
A P R I L	23	Ordinary Average Guy	Joe Walsh	-
A P R I L	23	The Reality of My Surroundings	Fishbone	-
A P R I L	23	Renegade	Charlie Daniels	-
A P R I L	23	Time, Love & Tenderness	Michael Bolton	-
A P R I L	26	Power of Love	Luther Vandross	-
A P R I L	29	Whirlpool	Chapterhouse	-
A P R I L	29	Space I'm In	The Candyskins	-
A P R I L	30	Birdland	Birdland	US
A P R I L	30	Cooleyhighharmony	Boyz II Men	Debut
A P R I L	30	Laughter & Lust	Joe Jackson	-
A P R I L	30	Fred Schneider	Fred Schneider	Re-issue
A P R I L	30	Spartacus	The Farm	Debut
A P R I L	30	Union	Yes	-
A P R I L	30	Why Do Birds Sing?	Violent Femmes	-
A P R I L	?	The Drill	Wire	–
A P R I L	?	The Young Gods Play Kurt Weill	The Young Gods	-
M A Y	1	Contradictions Collapse	Meshuggah	Debut
M A Y	2	Blessed Are the Sick	Morbid Angel	-
M A Y	3	Bullhead	Melvins	-
M A Y	6	White Light From the Mouth of Infinity	Swans	-
M A Y	7	5,000,000	Dread Zeppelin	-
M A Y	7	The Best of The Waterboys 81–90	The Waterboys	US
M A Y	7	Friendly Fa$cism	Consolidated	-
M A Y	7	Hard at Play	Huey Lewis and the News	-
M A Y	7	Peggy Suicide	Julian Cope	US
M A Y	7	Schubert Dip	EMF	-
M A Y	7	Star Time	James Brown	Box Set
M A Y	7	Sugar Tax	Orchestral Manoeuvres in the Dark	-
M A Y	7	Terminator X & The Valley of the Jeep Beets	Terminator X	-
M A Y	7	Worlds in Collision	Pere Ubu	-
M A Y	13	De La Soul Is Dead	De La Soul	-
M A Y	13	Pop Life	Bananarama	UK
M A Y	13	Positively Phranc	Phranc	-
M A Y	14	Don't Rock the Jukebox	Alan Jackson	-
M A Y	14	The Maria Dimension	The Legendary Pink Dots	-
M A Y	14	Mighty Like a Rose	Elvis Costello	-
M A Y	14	O.G. Original Gangster	Ice-T	-
M A Y	14	Sailing the Seas of Cheese	Primus	-
M A Y	14	Spellbound	Paula Abdul	-
M A Y	14	The One	Chubb Rock	-
M A Y	14	What Comes Around Goes Around	Tuff	-
M A Y	14	Yerself Is Steam	Mercury Rev	Debut
M A Y	17	Whispers	Thomas Anders	-
M A Y	20	Seal	Seal	Debut
M A Y	20	Unplugged (The Official Bootleg)	Paul McCartney	Live acoustic
M A Y	20	Shadow Thief of the Sun	Zoviet France	-
M A Y	21	Pink Bubbles Go Ape	Helloween	-
M A Y	21	Slinky	Milltown Brothers	US
M A Y	25	Virtual Rabbit	Susumu Hirasawa	-
M A Y	27	Seamonsters	The Wedding Present	-
M A Y	27	Shahbaaz	Nusrat Fateh Ali Kahn	-
M A Y	28	Cruel Inventions	Sam Phillips	-
M A Y	28	Electronic	Electronic	-
M A Y	28	Forever My Lady	Jodeci	Debut
M A Y	28	Gish	The Smashing Pumpkins	Debut
M A Y	28	Jungle Fever	Stevie Wonder	Soundtrack
M A Y	28	Like an Ever Flowing Stream	Dismember	-
M A Y	28	Never Loved Elvis	The Wonder Stuff	-
M A Y	28	Niggaz4Life	N.W.A	-
M A Y	29	Mars	B'z	EP
M A Y	?	Grippe	Jawbox	-
M A Y	?	Rumor and Sigh	Richard Thompson	-
J U N E	3	Fellow Hoodlums	Deacon Blue	-
J U N E	3	Love and Kisses	Dannii Minogue	UK
J U N E	4	Back on the Bus, Y'all	Indigo Girls	Live
J U N E	4	Funke, Funke Wisdom	Kool Moe Dee	-
J U N E	4	Make a Jazz Noise Here	Frank Zappa	Live
J U N E	10	The Mix	Kraftwerk	-
J U N E	10	Superstition	Siouxsie and the Banshees	-
J U N E	11	Lynyrd Skynyrd 1991	Lynyrd Skynyrd	-
J U N E	11	Owl	Nathalie Archangel	-
J U N E	11	Prime of My Life	Phyllis Hyman	-
J U N E	11	Slave to the Grind	Skid Row	-
J U N E	11	Slow, Deep and Hard	Type O Negative	-
J U N E	11	Unforgettable... with Love	Natalie Cole	-
J U N E	11	Warm Your Heart	Aaron Neville	-
J U N E	14	You Can't Do That on Stage Anymore, Vol. 4	Frank Zappa	2 discs; Live
J U N E	17	For Unlawful Carnal Knowledge	Van Halen	-
J U N E	18	Love Hurts	Cher	-
J U N E	18	Derelicts of Dialect	3rd Bass	-
J U N E	18	Turtle Soup	The Mock Turtles	US
J U N E	24	Baby	Yello	-
J U N E	24	Holidays in Eden	Marillion	-
J U N E	24	Magia	Shakira	-
J U N E	24	Unusual Heat	Foreigner	-
J U N E	25	All Souled Out	Pete Rock & CL Smooth	EP
J U N E	25	Attack of the Killer B's	Anthrax	Rarities album
J U N E	25	Electric Landlady	Kirsty MacColl	-
J U N E	25	Fireball Zone	Ric Ocasek	-
J U N E	25	Hollywood Vampires	L.A. Guns	-
J U N E	25	Luck of the Draw	Bonnie Raitt	-
J U N E	25	Surprise	Crystal Waters	-
J U N E	?	Twilight of the Gods	Bathory	-
J U N E	?	Solace	Sarah McLachlan	-
J U N E	?	The Forest	David Byrne	-
J U N E	?	The Tea Party	The Tea Party	Debut
J U N E	?	United States of Islam	Muslimgauze	-

=== July–September ===
Date		Album	Artist	Notes
J U L Y	1	13-Point Program to Destroy America	The Nation of Ulysses	-
J U L Y	1	Butchered at Birth	Cannibal Corpse	-
J U L Y	1	Damn Right, I've Got the Blues	Buddy Guy	-
J U L Y	1	Jealousy	X Japan	–
J U L Y	1	Love Versus Money	Noiseworks	-
J U L Y	1	Psycho Surgery	Tourniquet	-
J U L Y	1	Pure Poverty	Poor Righteous Teachers	-
J U L Y	1	The Sky is Falling and I Want My Mommy	Jello Biafra & Nomeansno	-
J U L Y	1	To Mother	Babes in Toyland	EP
J U L Y	1	Tumor Circus	Tumor Circus	Debut
J U L Y	1	Victory Gardens	John & Mary	US
J U L Y	1	The World as Best as I Remember It, Volume One	Rich Mullins	-
J U L Y	1	Steady Diet of Nothing	Fugazi	-
J U L Y	1	World Outside	The Psychedelic Furs	-
J U L Y	2	Different Lifestyles	BeBe & CeCe Winans	-
J U L Y	2	Dying Young: Original Soundtrack Album	Various Artists	Soundtrack
J U L Y	2	Hey Stoopid	Alice Cooper	-
J U L Y	2	Into the Great Wide Open	Tom Petty and the Heartbreakers	-
J U L Y	2	Peaceful Journey	Heavy D & the Boyz	-
J U L Y	2	The Ruler's Back	Slick Rick	-
J U L Y	2	Shades of Two Worlds	The Allman Brothers Band	-
J U L Y	2	Trisha Yearwood	Trisha Yearwood	-
J U L Y	2	We Can't Be Stopped	Geto Boys	-
J U L Y	2	What Do I Do with Me	Tanya Tucker	-
J U L Y	3	Am I Cool or What?	Various Artists	Soundtrack
J U L Y	9	Bill & Ted's Bogus Journey: Music from the Motion Picture	Various Artists	Soundtrack
J U L Y	9	Boyz n the Hood	Various Artists	Soundtrack
J U L Y	9	Forbidden Places	Meat Puppets	-
J U L Y	9	James	James	US
J U L Y	9	Starcaster	Head Candy	Debut
J U L Y	9	When Love Comes Down	Jimi Jamison	Debut
J U L Y	9	Woodface	Crowded House	-
J U L Y	15	Babyteeth	Therapy?	-
J U L Y	16	Biscuits	Living Colour	EP
J U L Y	16	The Globe	Big Audio Dynamite II	-
J U L Y	16	Straight Checkn 'Em	Compton's Most Wanted	-
J U L Y	16	Vocally Pimpin'	Above the Law	-
J U L Y	22	Frequencies	LFO	Debut
J U L Y	23	Breaking Atoms	Main Source	Debut
J U L Y	23	C.M.B.	Color Me Badd	Debut
J U L Y	23	Circa	Mary's Danish	-
J U L Y	23	Emotional Hooligan	Gary Clail	US
J U L Y	23	Homebase	DJ Jazzy Jeff & The Fresh Prince	-
J U L Y	23	I'm on Your Side	Jennifer Holliday	-
J U L Y	23	João	João Gilberto	-
J U L Y	23	Music for the People	Marky Mark and the Funky Bunch	-
J U L Y	23	Play	Squeeze	-
J U L Y	26	Every Good Boy Deserves Fudge	Mudhoney	-
J U L Y	26	Praise the Lard	Pig	-
J U L Y	30	A Future Without a Past...	Leaders of the New School	-
J U L Y	30	Day 1	Robbie Nevil	-
J U L Y	30	Jah Kingdom	Burning Spear	-
J U L Y	30	Widespread Panic	Widespread Panic	-
J U L Y	?	Slavestate	Godflesh	EP
A U G U S T	4	True at Heart	Doro	-
A U G U S T	5	Brainstorm	Young MC	-
A U G U S T	6	1000 Smiling Knuckles	Skin Yard	-
A U G U S T	6	Ask the Ages	Sonny Sharrock	-
A U G U S T	6	Harem Scarem	Harem Scarem	-
A U G U S T	6	Madra	Miranda Sex Garden	Debut
A U G U S T	6	Of the Heart, of the Soul and of the Cross: The Utopian Experience	P.M. Dawn	Debut
A U G U S T	6	Perspex Island	Robyn Hitchcock and the Egyptians	-
A U G U S T	9	Boys Will Be Boyz	Newsboys	-
A U G U S T	12	Abracadabra	ABC	-
A U G U S T	12	Hippopotamomus	Momus	-
A U G U S T	12	Metallica	Metallica	-
A U G U S T	12	Mental Vortex	Coroner	-
A U G U S T	13	Beneath the Mask	Chick Corea Elektric Band	-
A U G U S T	13	Brand New Man	Brooks & Dunn	Debut
A U G U S T	13	By Heart	Brenda K. Starr	-
A U G U S T	13	Cypress Hill	Cypress Hill	Debut
A U G U S T	13	Mr. Bungle	Mr. Bungle	Debut
A U G U S T	16	III	Sebadoh	-
A U G U S T	19	Strangeitude	Ozric Tentacles	-
A U G U S T	20	The Comfort Zone	Vanessa L. Williams	-
A U G U S T	20	Help Yourself	Julian Lennon	-
A U G U S T	20	Honey Lingers	Voice of the Beehive	-
A U G U S T	20	Little Magnets Versus the Bubble of Babble	Transvision Vamp	-
A U G U S T	20	Notorious	Joan Jett and the Blackhearts	-
A U G U S T	20	Pocket Full of Kryptonite	Spin Doctors	-
A U G U S T	20	Straight Outta Hell's Kitchen	Lisa Lisa and Cult Jam	-
A U G U S T	23	Jerry Garcia / David Grisman	Jerry Garcia & David Grisman	-
A U G U S T	23	Mistaken Identity	Donna Summer	-
A U G U S T	23	Paradise Lost	Cirith Ungol	-
A U G U S T	27	Leisure	Blur	Debut
A U G U S T	27	Aces	Suzy Bogguss	-
A U G U S T	27	Altered State	Altered State	Debut
A U G U S T	27	Backlash	Bad English	-
A U G U S T	27	Big Shot in the Dark	Timbuk3	-
A U G U S T	27	fear	Toad the Wet Sprocket	-
A U G U S T	27	The Fire Inside	Bob Seger	-
A U G U S T	27	I Need a Haircut	Biz Markie	-
A U G U S T	27	Jerry Garcia Band	Jerry Garcia Band	Live
A U G U S T	27	Lovescape	Neil Diamond	-
A U G U S T	27	The Prodigal Stranger	Procol Harum	-
A U G U S T	27	Ten	Pearl Jam	Debut
A U G U S T	?	Scrabbling at the Lock	The Ex & Tom Cora	-
S E P T E M B E R	2	Guaranteed	Level 42	-
S E P T E M B E R	2	Catfish Rising	Jethro Tull	-
S E P T E M B E R	2	Just for a Day	Slowdive	-
S E P T E M B E R	2	Ropin' the Wind	Garth Brooks	-
S E P T E M B E R	2	Tin Machine II	Tin Machine	-
S E P T E M B E R	3	Roll the Bones	Rush	-
S E P T E M B E R	3	Horrorscope	Overkill	-
S E P T E M B E R	3	Nature of a Sista'	Queen Latifah	-
S E P T E M B E R	3	Naughty by Nature	Naughty by Nature	-
S E P T E M B E R	3	Ratt & Roll 81–91	Ratt	Greatest Hits
S E P T E M B E R	3	Travelers and Thieves	Blues Traveler	-
S E P T E M B E R	9	Home Is in Your Head	His Name Is Alive	-
S E P T E M B E R	9	On Every Street	Dire Straits	-
S E P T E M B E R	10	Abort	Tribe	-
S E P T E M B E R	10	Blow Up	The Smithereens	-
S E P T E M B E R	10	The Force Behind the Power	Diana Ross	-
S E P T E M B E R	10	Leap of Faith	Kenny Loggins	-
S E P T E M B E R	10	Psychotic Supper	Tesla	-
S E P T E M B E R	10	Showstoppers	Barry Manilow	-
S E P T E M B E R	12	Screw It!	Danger Danger	Japanese release date
S E P T E M B E R	16	Laughing Stock	Talk Talk	-
S E P T E M B E R	16	Wings of Joy	Cranes	Debut
S E P T E M B E R	17	Use Your Illusion I	Guns N' Roses	-
S E P T E M B E R	17	Use Your Illusion II	Guns N' Roses	-
S E P T E M B E R	17	No More Tears	Ozzy Osbourne	US
S E P T E M B E R	17	Emotions	Mariah Carey	-
S E P T E M B E R	17	Pretty on the Inside	Hole	-
S E P T E M B E R	17	Act Like You Know	MC Lyte	-
S E P T E M B E R	17	Ain't a Damn Thang Changed	WC and the Maad Circle	-
S E P T E M B E R	17	Best O' Boingo	Oingo Boingo	-
S E P T E M B E R	17	Don't Try This at Home	Billy Bragg	-
S E P T E M B E R	17	In the Meantime, In Between Time	The Party	-
S E P T E M B E R	17	Still Feel Gone	Uncle Tupelo	-
S E P T E M B E R	19	Mad Mad World	Tom Cochrane	Canada; released in US in Feb '92
S E P T E M B E R	20	The Pod	Ween	-
S E P T E M B E R	23	Decade of Decadence	Mötley Crüe	Compilation
S E P T E M B E R	23	Ceremony	The Cult	-
S E P T E M B E R	23	Screamadelica	Primal Scream	-
S E P T E M B E R	23	Sigh No More	Gamma Ray	-
S E P T E M B E R	23	Shake Me Up	Little Feat	-
S E P T E M B E R	23	Trompe le Monde	Pixies	-
S E P T E M B E R	23	Worldwide	Everything but the Girl	-
S E P T E M B E R	23	Wretch	Kyuss	-
S E P T E M B E R	24	Blood Sugar Sex Magik	Red Hot Chili Peppers	-
S E P T E M B E R	24	Curtis Stigers	Curtis Stigers	Debut
S E P T E M B E R	24	Face the Nation	Kid 'n Play	-
S E P T E M B E R	24	Hymns to the Silence	Van Morrison	-
S E P T E M B E R	24	Nevermind	Nirvana	-
S E P T E M B E R	24	The Low End Theory	A Tribe Called Quest	-
S E P T E M B E R	24	Prove You Wrong	Prong	-
S E P T E M B E R	24	Queer	Thompson Twins	-
S E P T E M B E R	24	Rock the House Live!	Heart	Live
S E P T E M B E R	24	Rock 'til You Drop	Status Quo	-
S E P T E M B E R	24	Waking Up the Neighbours	Bryan Adams	-
S E P T E M B E R	30	Changing Faces	Bros	-
S E P T E M B E R	30	Ebbhead	Nitzer Ebb	-
S E P T E M B E R	30	Orbital	Orbital	Debut
S E P T E M B E R	30	Raise	Swervedriver	Debut
S E P T E M B E R	30	Stars	Simply Red	-
S E P T E M B E R	30	Storyville	Robbie Robertson	-
S E P T E M B E R	?	Live Train to Heartbreak Station	Cinderella	Live
S E P T E M B E R	?	The Ghost Sonata	Tuxedomoon	-
S E P T E M B E R	?	Late Night Grande Hotel	Nanci Griffith	-
S E P T E M B E R	?	This Year's Girl	Pizzicato Five	-
S E P T E M B E R	?	Tribal Voice	Yothu Yindi	-

=== October–December ===
Date		Album	Artist	Notes
O C T O B E R	1	Apocalypse 91... The Enemy Strikes Black	Public Enemy	-
O C T O B E R	1	Diamonds and Pearls	Prince & The New Power Generation	-
O C T O B E R	1	For My Broken Heart	Reba McEntire	-
O C T O B E R	1	The Greatest Hits	Cheap Trick	Greatest Hits
O C T O B E R	1	In Control Volume II (For Your Steering Pleasure)	Marley Marl	-
O C T O B E R	1	White Noise	Cop Shoot Cop	-
O C T O B E R	3	Everclear	American Music Club	-
O C T O B E R	4	Welcome to My Dream	MC 900 Ft. Jesus	-
O C T O B E R	7	Black Spring	Lush	EP
O C T O B E R	7	Paul McCartney's Liverpool Oratorio	Paul McCartney	-
O C T O B E R	8	Badmotorfinger	Soundgarden	-
O C T O B E R	8	Cool as Ice	Vanilla Ice	Soundtrack
O C T O B E R	8	Miscellaneous T	They Might Be Giants	B-Sides & Remixes
O C T O B E R	8	Mr. Scarface Is Back	Scarface	Solo Debut
O C T O B E R	8	To Whom It May Concern...	Freestyle Fellowship	Debut
O C T O B E R	8	Whenever We Wanted	John Mellencamp	-
O C T O B E R	9	The Plague That Makes Your Booty Move...It's the Infectious Grooves	Infectious Grooves	Debut
O C T O B E R	14	The First Letter	Wire	-
O C T O B E R	14	Let's Get to It	Kylie Minogue	-
O C T O B E R	14	Live Your Life Be Free	Belinda Carlisle	-
O C T O B E R	14	Foxbase Alpha	Saint Etienne	Debut
O C T O B E R	15	Streets: A Rock Opera	Savatage	-
O C T O B E R	15	As Ugly as They Wanna Be	Ugly Kid Joe	EP
O C T O B E R	15	Chorus	Erasure	-
O C T O B E R	15	Mr. Bad Example	Warren Zevon	-
O C T O B E R	15	Private Line	Gerald LeVert	-
O C T O B E R	15	Qui sème le vent récolte le tempo	MC Solaar	Debut
O C T O B E R	15	Vinyl	Dramarama	-
O C T O B E R	17	The Wayward Sons of Mother Earth	Skyclad	-
O C T O B E R	22	Beauty and the Beast: Original Motion Picture Soundtrack	Various Artists	-
O C T O B E R	22	Dondestan	Robert Wyatt	-
O C T O B E R	22	Effigy of the Forgotten	Suffocation	-
O C T O B E R	22	Girlfriend	Matthew Sweet	-
O C T O B E R	22	Human	Death	-
O C T O B E R	22	I Wish My Brother George Was Here	Del the Funky Homosapien	Debut
O C T O B E R	22	Mississippi Lad	Teddy Edwards	-
O C T O B E R	22	Pennywise	Pennywise	Debut
O C T O B E R	22	Second Coming	Shotgun Messiah	-
O C T O B E R	22	Two Rooms: Celebrating the Songs of Elton John & Bernie Taupin	Various Artists	Tribute album
O C T O B E R	22	Weld	Neil Young	Live; initially packaged with Arc CD
O C T O B E R	22	A Wolf in Sheep's Clothing	Black Sheep	Debut
O C T O B E R	25	Lust	Lords of Acid	Debut
O C T O B E R	28	Greatest Hits II	Queen	Compilation
O C T O B E R	28	This Is Not the Way Home	The Cruel Sea	-
O C T O B E R	29	Bite Down Hard	Britny Fox	-
O C T O B E R	29	Death Certificate	Ice Cube	-
O C T O B E R	29	Organized Konfusion	Organized Konfusion	Debut
O C T O B E R	29	Parallels	Fates Warning	-
O C T O B E R	29	Pearl of Great Price	Will	Debut
O C T O B E R	29	Prince of Darkness	Big Daddy Kane	-
O C T O B E R	29	Too Legit to Quit	Hammer	-
O C T O B E R	30	Necroticism – Descanting the Insalubrious	Carcass	-
O C T O B E R	30	No Pocky for Kitty	Superchunk	-
O C T O B E R	?	Cold World	Godflesh	EP
O C T O B E R	?	For Keeps	The Field Mice	-
O C T O B E R	?	It's... Madness Too	Madness	Compilation
O C T O B E R	?	Like Never Before	Taj Mahal	-
O C T O B E R	?	McIntyre, Treadmore and Davitt	Half Man Half Biscuit	-
O C T O B E R	?	Penny Century	The Clouds	Debut
N O V E M B E R	1	Infrared Roses	Grateful Dead	Live Compilation
N O V E M B E R	1	Lull	The Smashing Pumpkins	EP
N O V E M B E R	1	Mule Bone	Taj Mahal	-
N O V E M B E R	1	Not So Soft	Ani DiFranco	-
N O V E M B E R	4	Live Baby Live	INXS	Live
N O V E M B E R	4	Discography, The Complete Singles Collection	Pet Shop Boys	-
N O V E M B E R	4	Loveless	My Bloody Valentine	-
N O V E M B E R	4	Shepherd Moons	Enya	-
N O V E M B E R	4	0 + 2 = 1	Nomeansno	-
N O V E M B E R	4	Bandwagonesque	Teenage Fanclub	-
N O V E M B E R	5	Rush Street	Richard Marx	-
N O V E M B E R	5	Blind	Corrosion of Conformity	-
N O V E M B E R	5	Paul Simon's Concert in the Park	Paul Simon	Live
N O V E M B E R	5	The Sky Is Crying	Stevie Ray Vaughan	Recorded 1984–'89
N O V E M B E R	11	We Can't Dance	Genesis	-
N O V E M B E R	11	Night of the Stormrider	Iced Earth	UK
N O V E M B E R	11	Bitterblue	Bonnie Tyler	-
N O V E M B E R	11	Real Love	Lisa Stansfield	-
N O V E M B E R	11	Essential	Divinyls	Greatest Hits
N O V E M B E R	11	Wall of Hits	Slade	Compilation
N O V E M B E R	12	2Pacalypse Now	2Pac	Debut
N O V E M B E R	12	80–85	Bad Religion	Compilation
N O V E M B E R	12	Angel Rat	Voivod	-
N O V E M B E R	12	Clandestine	Entombed	-
N O V E M B E R	12	For the Boys	Bette Midler	Soundtrack
N O V E M B E R	12	In Celebration of Life	Yanni	-
N O V E M B E R	12	Penicillin on Wax	Tim Dog	-
N O V E M B E R	12	Sticks and Stones	Tracy Lawrence	-
N O V E M B E R	12	Swallow This Live	Poison	2 discs; Live
N O V E M B E R	18	Achtung Baby	U2	-
N O V E M B E R	18	Now That's What I Call Music! 20	Various Artists	Compilation
N O V E M B E R	19	Beckology	Jeff Beck	Box Set
N O V E M B E R	19	A Closer Look	Babyface	-
N O V E M B E R	19	Cool Hand Lōc	Tone Lōc	-
N O V E M B E R	19	Inner Child	Shanice	-
N O V E M B E R	19	Pandora's Box	Aerosmith	Box Set
N O V E M B E R	19	Romance	Luis Miguel	-
N O V E M B E R	19	T.E.V.I.N.	Tevin Campbell	Debut
N O V E M B E R	26	Dangerous	Michael Jackson	-
N O V E M B E R	26	Hook: Original Motion Picture Soundtrack	John Williams	-
N O V E M B E R	26	Keep It Comin'	Keith Sweat	-
N O V E M B E R	26	Ricky Martin	Ricky Martin	Debut
N O V E M B E R	26	Unsane	Unsane	Debut
N O V E M B E R	27	In the Life	B'z	–
N O V E M B E R	?	Brown	Grotus	Debut
N O V E M B E R	?	Every Man and Woman Is a Star	Ultramarine	-
N O V E M B E R	?	The First Years of Piracy	Running Wild	
N O V E M B E R	?	Island	HÖH and Current 93	-
N O V E M B E R	?	No Jive	Nazareth	-
D E C E M B E R	3	Affairs of the Heart	Jody Watley	-
D E C E M B E R	6	Forest of Equilibrium	Cathedral	-
D E C E M B E R	6	Spine of God	Monster Magnet	-
D E C E M B E R	10	Until the End of the World	Various Artists	-
D E C E M B E R	12	Lovelyville	Thinking Fellers Union Local 282	-
D E C E M B E R	15	V	Legião Urbana	-
D E C E M B E R	17	Kerplunk	Green Day	LP Vinyl USA Release
D E C E M B E R	25	Mō Sagasanai	Zard	-
D E C E M B E R	31	Juice	Various Artists	Soundtrack
D E C E M B E R	31	Mental Jewelry	Live	Debut

=== Release date unknown ===
- Artistic Vice – Daniel Johnston
- Ramp – Giant Sand

== Biggest hit singles ==
The following songs achieved the highest chart positions in the charts of 1991.

#	Artist	Title	Year	Country	Chart Entries
1	Bryan Adams	(Everything I Do) I Do it For You	1991	(Canada)	UK 1 - Jun 1991 (25 weeks), US Billboard 1 - Jun 1991 (22 weeks), US BB 1 of 1991, US CashBox 1 of 1991, ARC 1 of 1991 (peak 1 17 weeks), US Radio 1 of 1991 (peak 1 12 weeks), Holland 1 - Jul 1991 (21 weeks), Sweden 1 - Aug 1991 (15 weeks), Finland 1 for 1 week - Aug 1991, Austria 1 - Aug 1991 (8 months), Brazil 1 of 1991, Switzerland 1 - Jul 1991 (34 weeks), Norway 1 - Jul 1991 (21 weeks), Poland 1 - Jul 1991 (44 weeks), Belgium 1 - Jul 1991 (20 weeks), Germany 1 - Jan 1992 (7 months), ODK Germany 1 - Jul 1991 (34 weeks) (5 weeks at number 1) (23 weeks in top 10), Eire 1 for 11 weeks - Jul 1991, Canada RPM 1 for 9 weeks - Aug 1991, Canada 1 of 1991, New Zealand 1 for 8 weeks - Aug 1991, Australia 1 for 11 weeks - Jul 1991, Europe 1 for 18 weeks - Jul 1991, Germany 1 for 5 weeks - Oct 1991, Spain 1 for 1 week - Oct 1991, Top Song of 1991 of the Billboard 50th list, US 3 X Platinum (certified by RIAA in Sep 1991), UK 2 x Platinum (certified by BPI in Sep 1991), Japan (Tokyo) 2 - Jul 1991 (30 weeks), Oscar in 1991 (film 'Robin Hood: Prince of Thieves') (Nominated), Grammy in 1991 (Nominated), Golden Globe in 1991 (film 'Robin Hood: Prince of Thieves') (Nominated), Germany Platinum (certified by BMieV in 1991), Switzerland 3 of 1991, Australia 3 of 1991, POP 3 of 1991, Europe 5 of the 1990s (1991), TOTP 6, UK sales 7 of the 1990s (1,520 k in 1991), Japan (Osaku) 9 of 1991 (peak 1 21 weeks), Italy 9 of 1991, Germany 9 of the 1990s (peak 1 25 weeks), UKMIX 10, Billboard 50th song 16, 55th Billboard 100 18 (1991), Billboard100 19, Scrobulate 30 of ballad, France (InfoDisc) 46 of the 1990s (peak 1, 30 weeks, 508k sales estimated, 1991), nuTsie 55 of 1990s, Virgin 60, DMDB 78 (1991), Poland 96 of all time, Holland free40 99 of 1991, OzNet 121, Belgium 150 of all time, RYM 73 of 1991, Global 7 (10 M sold) - 1991, Party 70 of 2007
2	Michael Jackson	Black or White	1991	(United States)	UK 1 - Nov 1991 (21 weeks), US Billboard 1 - Nov 1991 (19 weeks), Japan (Tokyo) 1 - Nov 1991 (20 weeks), Finland 1 for 1 week - Nov 1991, Switzerland 1 - Nov 1991 (30 weeks), Norway 1 - Nov 1991 (17 weeks), Poland 1 - Nov 1991 (20 weeks), Belgium 1 - Nov 1991 (14 weeks), Italy 1 for 8 weeks - Nov 1991, Eire 1 for 1 week - Nov 1991, Canada RPM 1 for 2 weeks - Dec 1991, New Zealand 1 for 5 weeks - Nov 1991, Australia 1 for 5 weeks - Nov 1991, Europe 1 for 10 weeks - Nov 1991, Spain 1 for 1 week - Jan 1992, ARC 2 of 1991 (peak 1 13 weeks), Austria 2 - Nov 1991 (5 months), Germany 2 - Jan 1992 (5 months), ODK Germany 2 - Nov 1991 (34 weeks) (13 weeks in top 10), US Platinum (certified by RIAA in Jan 1992), Holland 3 - Nov 1991 (10 weeks), Italy 3 of 1991, Germany Gold (certified by BMieV in 1992), Sweden 11 - Jul 2009 (5 weeks), US BB 14 of 1992, Japan (Osaku) 14 of 1992 (peak 1 21 weeks), Switzerland 14 of 1992, Brazil 16 of 1992, POP 19 of 1991, Australia 24 of 1992, US CashBox 29 of 1992, US Radio 36 of 1991 (peak 1 8 weeks), Canada 37 of 1992, nuTsie 60 of 1990s, Germany 115 of the 1990s (peak 2 15 weeks), UK Silver (certified by BPI in Dec 1991), RYM 96 of 1991
3	R.E.M.	Losing My Religion	1991	(United States)	Holland 1 - Mar 1991 (13 weeks), Poland 1 - Apr 1991 (24 weeks), Belgium 1 - Apr 1991 (11 weeks), Europe 1 of the 1990s (1991), Grammy Hall of Fame in 2017 (1991), MTV Video of the year 1991, nuTsie 2 of 1990s, Grammy in 1991 (Nominated), US Billboard 4 - Apr 1991 (21 weeks), Norway 4 - Jun 1991 (11 weeks), US Gold (certified by RIAA in Sep 1991), US (Sup) Gold (certified by RIAA in Oct 2009), Sweden 5 - Mar 1991 (9 weeks), Holland free40 7 of 1991, Austria 7 - Aug 1991 (4 months), Switzerland 11 - Oct 1991 (9 weeks), Belgium 12 of all time, UK 19 - Mar 1991 (9 weeks), Japan (Osaku) 24 of 1991 (peak 8 20 weeks), Canada 28 of 1991, ARC 29 of 1991 (peak 3 14 weeks), Brazil 30 of 1991, Virgin 30, US BB 33 of 1991, US CashBox 39 of 1991, 39 in 2FM list, US Radio 44 of 1991 (peak 4 9 weeks), Poland 44 of all time, Acclaimed 44 (1991), Japan (Tokyo) 46 - Mar 1991 (9 weeks), POP 61 of 1991, Vinyl Surrender 66 (1991), Scrobulate 69 of rock, Italy 70 of 1991, OzNet 90, WXPN 106, RIAA 143, Rolling Stone 169, RYM 5 of 1991, WFUV 86, one of the Rock and Roll Hall of Fame 500
4	Roxette	Joyride	1991	(Sweden)	US Billboard 1 - Mar 1991 (19 weeks), Japan (Tokyo) 1 - Mar 1991 (18 weeks), Holland 1 - Mar 1991 (13 weeks), Sweden 1 - Mar 1991 (12 weeks), Austria 1 - Mar 1991 (5 months), Switzerland 1 - Mar 1991 (25 weeks), Norway 1 - Mar 1991 (16 weeks), Belgium 1 - Mar 1991 (13 weeks), Germany 1 - Mar 1991 (5 months), ODK Germany 1 - Mar 1991 (32 weeks) (8 weeks at number 1) (15 weeks in top 10), Canada RPM 1 for 3 weeks - May 1991, Australia 1 for 3 weeks - Apr 1991, Europe 1 for 10 weeks - Mar 1991, Germany 1 for 8 weeks - Apr 1991, Spain 1 for 1 week - May 1991, Switzerland 2 of 1991, Poland 3 - Apr 1991 (12 weeks), UK 4 - Mar 1991 (10 weeks), Germany Gold (certified by BMieV in 1991), Canada 6 of 1991, France 7 - Apr 1991 (2 weeks), Australia 13 of 1991, Japan (Osaku) 14 of 1991 (peak 1 19 weeks), US BB 23 of 1991, Italy 24 of 1991, Germany 24 of the 1990s (peak 1 20 weeks), US CashBox 33 of 1991, US Radio 37 of 1991 (peak 2 9 weeks), POP 37 of 1991, ARC 42 of 1991 (peak 1 13 weeks), Brazil 50 of 1991
5	Enigma	Sadeness (Part I)	1990	(Germany)	UK 1 - Dec 1990 (12 weeks), Holland 1 - Nov 1990 (13 weeks), France 1 - Dec 1990 (2 weeks), Austria 1 - Nov 1990 (5 months), Switzerland 1 - Nov 1990 (21 weeks), Norway 1 - Dec 1990 (14 weeks), Belgium 1 - Dec 1990 (12 weeks), Italy 1 for 5 weeks - Feb 1991, Germany 1 - Jan 1991 (5 months), ODK Germany 1 - Oct 1990 (27 weeks) (11 weeks at number 1) (16 weeks in top 10), Eire 1 for 1 week - Jan 1991, Europe 1 for 9 weeks - Jan 1991, Germany 1 for 11 weeks - Nov 1990, Spain 1 for 1 week - Feb 1991, Sweden 2 - Dec 1990 (5 weeks), Poland 2 - Dec 1990 (14 weeks), Germany Platinum (certified by BMieV in 1991), Japan (Tokyo) 4 - Mar 1991 (15 weeks), US Gold (certified by RIAA in Apr 1991), US Billboard 5 - Feb 1991 (18 weeks), Switzerland 6 of 1991, Italy 7 of 1991, Brazil 13 of 1991, Germany 21 of the 1990s (peak 1 18 weeks), POP 43 of 1991, US BB 63 of 1991, Canada 68 of 1991, US Radio 73 of 1991 (peak 7 7 weeks), France (InfoDisc) 88 of the 1990s (peak 1, 26 weeks, 385k sales estimated, 1990), Japan (Osaku) 92 of 1991 (peak 13 18 weeks), OzNet 226, UK Silver (certified by BPI in Jan 1991), RYM 47 of 1990

== Top 40 Chart hit singles ==
Song title	Artist(s)	Release date(s)	US	UK	Highest chart position	Other Chart Performance(s)
"3 a.m. Eternal"	The KLF	January 1991	5	1	1 (Denmark, Finland, United Kingdom)	See chart performance entry
"À nos actes manqués"	Fredericks Goldman Jones	1991	n/a	n/a	1 (Québec)	1 (France Airplay Chart [AM & FM Stations]) – 2 (France) – 11 (Europe [European Airplay Top 50]) – 17 (Europe [Eurochart Hot 100])
"The Actor"	Michael Learns to Rock	November 1991	n/a	n/a	1 (Indonesia, Norway)	4 (Denmark) – 7 (Sweden) – 32 (Switzerland) – 54 (Europe)
"Addams Groove"	MC Hammer	December 1991	7	4	4 (Ireland, United Kingdom)	See chart performance entry
"Alive"	Pearl Jam	July 1991	n/a	16	9 (Australia)	13 (Ireland) – 13 (Netherlands [Dutch top 40]) – 16 (Belgium) – 15 (U.S. Billboard Mainstream Rock) – 18 (U.S. Billboard Alternative Airplay) – 19 (Netherlands [Single Top 100]) – 20 (New Zealand) – 44 (Germany)
"All the Man That I Need"	Whitney Houston	January 1991	1	13	1 (Canada, Cuba, United States)	See chart performance entry
"All This Time"	Sting	January 1991	5	22	1 (Canada)	See chart performance entry
"Always Look on the Bright Side of Life" (reissue)	Monty Python	September 1991	n/a	3	1 (Ireland)	See chart performance entry
"Always There"	Incognito & Jocelyn Brown	July 1991	n/a	6	2 (Luxembourg, Netherlands [Single Top 100])	See chart performance entry
"Angelina"	P.S.Y.	1991	n/a	n/a	9 (France)	13 (France [Airplay Chart – AM Stations]) – 49 (Europe)
"Any Dream Will Do"	Jason Donovan	June 1991	n/a	1	1 (Ireland, United Kingdom)	See chart performance entry

=== Other Chart hit singles ===
- "Anasthasia" – T99
- "Baby Baby" – Amy Grant (#1 US, #2 CAN, NZ, UK)
- "Bacardi Feeling (Summer Dreamin')" – Kate Yanai (#1 AUT, GER, #2 SWI)
- "Baila Me" – Gipsy Kings (#5 NLD, #7 BE, #10 AUT)
- "Beauty and the Beast" – Celine Dion & Peabo Bryson (#2 CAN, #8 NZ, #9 US)
- "Buenos Amigos" – Alvaro Torres & Selena (#1 US Latin)
- "The Big L." – Roxette (#9 IRL, #10 SWE)
- "Black or White" – Michael Jackson
- "Bohemian Rhapsody" – Queen (#1 UK, IRL, NLD, #5 AUS)
- "Bring Your Daughter... to the Slaughter" – Iron Maiden (#1 UK, FIN, #5 IRL)
- "Calling Elvis" – Dire Straits (#1 POL, #2 BE, NOR, SWI)
- "Call My Name" - OMD
- "Can't Stop This Thing We Started" – Bryan Adams (#1 CAN, #2 NLD, US)
- "Can't Let Go" – Mariah Carey (#2 US, #3 CAN)
- "Caribbean Blue" – Enya (#8 IRL)
- "Change" – Lisa Stansfield (#2 IT, #6 SP, #7 NLD)
- "Chorus" – Erasure (#1 ARG, SING, #3 UK)
- "Colour of Love" – Snap! (#3 IT, #4 AUT, SWI, #6 SWE)
- "Coming Out of the Dark" – Gloria Estefan (#1 US, CAN, SP, #4 JAP)
- "Crazy" – Seal (#1 BE, NLD, SWE, SWI)
- "Cream" – Prince (#1 US, #2 AUS, #3 NOR, SWI)
- "Crucified" – Army of Lovers (#1 BE, #2 NLD, #3 AUT)
- "Cry for Help" – Rick Astley (#4 CAN, #7 UK, US)
- "Danca tago-mago" – Kaoma (#3 FR, #6 BE, POR)
- "Darlin'" – Roch Voisine (#2 FR, #5 BE)
- "Deep, Deep Trouble" – The Simpsons (#1 IRL, #7 UK, #10 NZ)
- "Déjeuner en paix" – Stephan Eicher (#2 FR, #8 BE)
- "Désenchantée" – Mylène Farmer (#1 FR, #9 CAN)
- "Dis-moi bébé" – Benny B feat. DJ Daddy K (#4 FR, BE)
- "Dizzy" – Vic Reeves & The Wonder Stuff (#1 UK)
- "Do the Bartman" – The Simpsons (#1 AUS, IRL, NZ, NOR, UK)
- "Do You Remember?" – Phil Collins (#4 US)
- "Do Anything" – Natural Selection (#2 US)
- "Don't Cry" – Guns N' Roses (#1 FIN, IRL, #2 NZ, NOR)
- "Don't Let the Sun Go Down on Me" – George Michael & Elton John (#1 CAN, FR, IT, NLD, NOR, SWI, UK, US)
- "E vado via" – Félix Gray & Didier Barbelivien (#5 FR)
- "Emotions" – Mariah Carey (#1 CAN, US, #3 NZ)
- "Enter Sandman" – Metallica (#1 FIN, #2 NOR, #4 POL, #5 UK)
- "Esperança do natal" – Chico & Roberta (#3 FR)
- "Every Heartbeat" – Amy Grant (#2 US, #7 CAN)
- "Everybody's Free (To Feel Good)" – Rozalla (#2 BE, CAN, NLD, SP, #3 SWI, #6 GER, SWE, UK)
- "(Everything I Do) I Do It for You" – Bryan Adams
- "Fångad av en stormvind" – Carola Häggkvist
- "Fading Like a Flower (Every Time You Leave)" – Roxette
- "Finally" – CeCe Peniston (#2 UK, #5 US, IRL, #6 NLD)
- "The First Time" – Surface
- "The Fly" – U2 (#1 AUS, IRL, NZ, NOR, SP, UK)
- "From a Distance" – Bette Midler (#6 UK, #8 AUS)
- "Future Love Paradise" – Seal (#6 NLD, #7 SWI, #8 IRL, #9 NOR)
- "Get Here" – Oleta Adams (#5 UK, US)
- "Get Ready for This" – 2 Unlimited (#2 AUS, SP, UK, #3 IRL)
- "Gett Off" – Prince (#4 UK, #8 AUS)
- "G.L.A.D" – Kim Appleby
- "Gonna Make You Sweat (Everybody Dance Now)" – C+C Music Factory (#3 US)
- "Good Vibrations" – Marky Mark & the Funky Bunch (#1 US, #1 SWI, #2 NOR)
- "The Grease Megamix" – John Travolta & Olivia Newton-John (#1 AUS, SP, #3 NLD, UK)
- "Give it Away" – Red Hot Chili Peppers (#9 UK)
- "Gypsy Woman (She's Homeless)" – Crystal Waters (#1 NLD, IT, SP, SWI)
- "Here We Go (Let's Rock & Roll)" – C+C Music Factory (#3 US, #4 SP, #9 NZ)
- "Highwire" – The Rolling Stones
- "Hold You Tight" – Tara Kemp (#3 US)
- "Hole Hearted" – Extreme
- "How to Dance" – Bingoboys & Princessa
- "I Adore Mi Amor" – Color Me Badd (#1 US, #8 CAN, NZ)
- "I Believe" – EMF
- "I Don't Wanna Cry" – Mariah Carey (#1 US, #2 CAN)
- "I Like the Way (The Kissing Game)" – Hi-Five (#1 US)
- "I Love Your Smile" – Shanice (#1 NLD, #2 CAN, US, UK)
- "I Touch Myself" – Divinyls (#1 AUS, #4 US, #8 IRL)
- "I Wanna Sex You Up" – Color Me Badd (#1 NZ, UK, #2 US)
- "I Wonder Why" – Curtis Stigers (#5 UK, #9 US)
- "Il faut laisser le temps au temps" – Félix Gray & Didier Barbelivien (#1 FR)
- "Innuendo" – Queen (#1 UK, #3 SWI, #4 NLD, IRL, IT)
- "It Ain't Over 'til It's Over" – Lenny Kravitz (#2 CAN, US)
- "It's Grim Up North" – The Justified Ancients of Mu Mu
- "It's So Hard to Say Goodbye to Yesterday" – Boyz II Men (#2 US)
- "I've Been Thinking About You" – Londonbeat (#1 AUS, AUT, BE, CAN, FIN, GER, IT, NLD, SP, SWE, SWI, US)
- "J'ai des doutes" – Sara Mandiano (#10 FR)
- "J'ai peur" – François Feldman and Joniece Jamison (#7 FR)
- "Joyride" – Roxette
- "Jump to the Beat" - Dannii Minogue
- "Just A Groove" – Nomad (#6 NLD, #10 BE, SWI)
- "Just the Way It Is, Baby" – The Rembrandts (#6 GER, #9 AUT, FR)
- "Kiss Them for Me" – Siouxsie and the Banshees (#23 US, #32 UK)
- "La Berceuse du petit diable" – Roch Voisine (#3 FR, #6 BE)
- "La Zoubida" – Lagaf' (#1 FR)
- "Last Train to Trancentral" – The KLF
- "Le Dormeur" – Pleasure Game (#5 BE, #9 FR)
- "Learning to Fly" – Tom Petty and the Heartbreakers (#1 FIN, #2 UK, NLD, #4 GER, NOR)
- "Let There Be Love" – Simple Minds (#4 NLD, #5 IRL, #6 UK)
- "Let's Talk About Sex" – Salt-n-Pepa (#1 AUS, AUT, BE, NLD, SWI)
- "Losing My Religion" – R.E.M.
- "Love and Understanding" – Cher (#6 AUT, #7 IRL, #9 BE, NLD)
- "Love Is a Wonderful Thing" – Michael Bolton (#2 CAN, #4 US)
- "Love of a Lifetime" – FireHouse
- "Love... Thy Will Be Done" – Martika (#1 AUS, #4 NZ, #7 CAN)
- "Love to Hate You" – Erasure (#4 FIN, SWE, UK, #5 IRL, #6 AUT)
- "Mea Culpa (Part II)" – Enigma (#4 FR, #7 GER, IT, SP)
- "Mega Mix" – Snap! (#5 NLD, SWI, #7 NZ, #10 SP)
- "Mercy Mercy Me (The Ecology)" / "I Want You" – Robert Palmer
- "Mistadobalina" – Del tha Funkee Homosapien
- "More Than Words" – Extreme (#1 BE, CAN, NLD, NZ, US)
- "The Motown Song" – Rod Stewart (#1 CAN, #10 US)
- "Motownphilly" – Boyz II Men (#3 US)
- "Move Any Mountain" – The Shamen (#4 UK, SWI, #5 FIN, #8 BE)
- "Move That Body" – Technotronic (#3 IRL, #10 SWI)
- "Mysterious Ways" – U2 (#1 IRL, #3 AUS, NZ)
- "No Son of Mine" – Genesis (#1 CAN, #3 GER, #4 NOR)
- "Now That We Found Love" – Heavy D & the Boyz (#2 NL, SWE, UK, #4 GER, SWI)
- "Obsession" – Army of Lovers (#2 SWE, #5 FIN, SWI, #7 GER)
- "The One and Only" – Chesney Hawkes (#1 UK, AUT, #2 SWE)
- "One More Try" – Timmy T (#1 US, #2 NLD, #5 SWE)
- "O.P.P." – Naughty by Nature (#4 CAN, #6 SWI, US)
- "Pandora's Box" – Orchestral Manoeuvres in the Dark (#7 AUT, SWE, UK)
- "Piece of My Heart" – Tara Kemp (#7 US)
- "Place in This World" – Michael W. Smith (#6 US)
- "Place des grands hommes" – Patrick Bruel (#4 FR)
- "Poupée psychédélique" – Thierry Hazard (#2 FR)
- "Promise Me" – Beverley Craven (#2 BE, #3 UK, #6 FR)
- "The Promise of a New Day" – Paula Abdul (#1 US, CAN)
- "Qu'est-ce qu'on fait maintenant ?" – Benny B feat. DJ Daddy K (#2 FR, BE)
- "Qui a le droit... (live)" – Patrick Bruel (#1 FR)
- "Radio Song" – R.E.M. (#5 IRL)
- "Regrets" – Mylène Farmer and Jean-Louis Murat (#2 BE, #3 FR)
- "Ride Like the Wind" – East Side Beat (#3 UK, #4 BE, IRL, #6 NLD)
- "Right Here, Right Now" – Jesus Jones (#2 US)
- "Ring Ring Ring (Ha Ha Hey)" – De La Soul (#1 FIN, SWI, #2 NLD)
- "Rescue Me" – Madonna (#3 UK, IRL, #9 US)
- "Rhythm of My Heart" – Rod Stewart (#1 CAN, IRL, #2 AUT)
- "Rocket Man" – Kate Bush
- "Romantic" – Karyn White (#1 US)
- "Romantic World" – Dana Dawson (#4 FR)
- "Rush" – Big Audio Dynamite II (#1 AUS, NZ)
- "Rush Rush" – Paula Abdul (#1 CAN, US, #2 AUS)
- "Saga Africa" – Yannick Noah (#2 FR)
- "Sailing on the Seven Seas" – OMD (#3 UK, #9 GER)
- "Saltwater" – Julian Lennon (#6 UK)
- "Secret Love" – Bee Gees (#2 AUT, GER, #5 BE, UK)
- "Set Adrift on Memory Bliss" – P.M. Dawn (#1 NZ, US)
- "Senza una donna" – Zucchero & Paul Young (#1 BE, IT, NOR, SWE)
- "Send Me An Angel" – Scorpions (#3 POL, #4 NLD, SWE, #5 GER)
- "Shiny Happy People" – R.E.M. (#2 IRL, #5 CAN, #6 UK)
- "Shocked" – Kylie Minogue (#1 SLO, #2 IRL, #6 SA, UK)
- "The Shoop Shoop Song (It's in His Kiss)" – Cher (#1 AUT, IRL, NOR, UK)
- "Should I Stay or Should I Go" – The Clash (#1 UK, #2 IRL, NZ, #3 BE, NLD, NOR, POL)
- "The Show Must Go On" – Queen (#2 FR, #3 POL, #7 GER, NLD)
- "Silent Lucidity" – Queensrÿche
- "Sit Down" – James (#2 UK)
- "Smells Like Teen Spirit" – Nirvana (#1 BE, FR, NZ, SP, #2 GER, NOR)
- "So Sad" – Gregorian (#1 POR, #9 FR)
- "Someday" – Mariah Carey (#1 CAN, US)
- "Something Got Me Started" – Simply Red (#5 AUT, NLD, IT, #6 SWI)
- "Spending My Time" – Roxette (#9 GER, IT)
- "Stars" – Simply Red (#8 UK)
- "Strike It Up" – Black Box (#4 NLD, #8 IRL, US)
- "Summertime" – DJ Jazzy Jeff & The Fresh Prince (#4 US, #5 NZ)
- "Sunshine on a Rainy Day" – Zoë
- "That's What Love Is For" – Amy Grant (#7 US)
- "There Will Never Be Another Tonight" – Bryan Adams (#2 CAN)
- "There's No Other Way" – Blur (#8 UK)
- "These Are the Days of Our Lives" – Queen
- "Things That Make You Go Hmmm..." – C+C Music Factory (#2 NZ, #4 UK, US)
- "Too Blind to See It" – Kym Sims
- "Too Legit to Quit" – MC Hammer (#4 NZ, #5 US, #6 UK)
- "Touch Me (All Night Long)" – Cathy Dennis (#2 US, #5 UK, #9 CAN)
- "Tout c'qui nous sépare" – Jil Caplan (#6 FR)
- "Twist and Shout" – Deacon Blue (#10 UK)
- "Unbelievable" – EMF (#1 US, #3 SWI, UK)
- "Under the Bridge" – Red Hot Chili Peppers (#1 AUS, BE, NLD, #2 NZ)
- "Unfinished Sympathy" – Massive Attack (#1 NLD, #9 SWI)
- "Unforgettable" – Natalie Cole & Nat King Cole (#2 AUS, #7 NZ, #10 IRL)
- "The Unforgiven" – Metallica (#2 GR, #9 POL)
- "Walking in Memphis" – Marc Cohn (#7 IRL)
- "We Should Be Together" – Cliff Richard (#9 IRL, #10 UK)
- "What Do I Have to Do" – Kylie Minogue
- "What Time Is Love?" – The KLF (#5 UK, #6 GER)
- "What Comes Naturally" – Sheena Easton (#3 AUS)
- "When a Man Loves a Woman" – Michael Bolton
- "When Something Is Wrong with My Baby" – John Farnham + Jimmy Barnes (#3 AUS, #6 NZ)
- "When You Tell Me That You Love Me" – Diana Ross (#1 IRL, #2 UK)
- "Where Does My Heart Beat Now" – Celine Dion (#4 NOR, US, #6 CAN)
- "Where the Streets Have No Name (I Can't Take My Eyes off You)" – Pet Shop Boys (#2 FIN, IRL, SP, #3 SWI, #4 UK)
- "Wildside" – Marky Mark and the Funky Bunch
- "Wind of Change" – Scorpions
- "You" – Ten Sharp (#1 FR, NOR, SWE)
- "You Could Be Mine" – Guns N' Roses (#1 FIN, IRL, NZ, SP)
- "You're in Love" – Wilson Phillips

== Notable singles ==
Song title	Artist(s)	Release date(s)	Other Chart Performance(s)
"Don't Go Now"	Ratcat	April 1991	1 (Australia)
"Losing My Religion"	R.E.M.	February 1991	See chart performance entry
"Man in the Box"	Alice in Chains	January 1991	18 (U.S. Billboard Mainstream Rock)
"Planet of Sound"	Pixies	May 1991	n/a
"Safe from Harm"	Massive Attack	May 1991	See chart performance entry
"Sexuality"	Billy Bragg	September 1991	2 (U.S. Billboard Alternative Airplay) – 27 (UK Singles Chart)
"Smells Like Teen Spirit"	Nirvana	September 1991	See chart performance entry
"To Here Knows When"	My Bloody Valentine	February 1991	29 (UK Singles Chart)
"Treaty"	Yothu Yindi	June 1991	See chart performance entry
"Unfinished Sympathy"	Massive Attack	February 1991	See chart performance entry
"Vapour Trail"	Ride	April 1991	n/a
"When You Sleep"	My Bloody Valentine	November 1991	n/a

=== Other Notable singles ===
- "Alive And Living Now" – The Golden Palominos
- "D.C." – Died Pretty
- "Hieronymous" b/w "Lucy's Eyes" – The Clouds
- "I Think I Love You" – Voice of the Beehive
- "Squirrel" b/w "It's Time" – Levitation

== Top best albums of the year ==
All albums have been named albums of the year for their hits in the charts. '

1. Nirvana – Nevermind
2. Pearl Jam – Ten
3. My Bloody Valentine – Loveless
4. U2 – Achtung Baby
5. Red Hot Chili Peppers – Blood Sugar Sex Magik
6. Metallica – Metallica
7. Primal Scream – Screamadelica
8. Slint – Spiderland
9. A Tribe Called Quest – The Low End Theory
10. Massive Attack – Blue Lines
11. Talk Talk – Laughing Stock

== Published popular music ==
- "Dreamland" w. Alan Bergman & Marilyn Bergman m. Dave Grusin
- "Look Around" w. Betty Comden & Adolph Green m. Cy Coleman from the musical The Will Rogers Follies
- "Moja domovina"

== Classical music ==
- George Crumb – Easter Dawning for carillon
- Mario Davidovsky – Simple Dances for flute, two percussion, piano, and cello
- Joël-François Durand – un feu distinct for flute, clarinet, piano, violin and cello
- Lorenzo Ferrero
  - Concerto for Piano and Orchestra
  - Parodia, for chamber ensemble
  - Zaubermarsch, for small orchestra
- Sofia Gubaidulina
  - Gerade und ungerade (Чет и нечет) for seven percussionists, including cymbalom
  - Silenzio for bayan, violin, and cello
- Angelo Gilardino
  - Musica per l'Angelo della Melancholia, for guitar
  - Variazioni sulla Fortuna, for guitar
- Karel Goeyvaerts
  - Opbouw (Construction), for orchestra
  - De Zang van Aquarius, version for symphony orchestra
- Jan Klusák – Stesk po Mozartovi
- Ulrich Leyendecker – Symphony No. 3
- Witold Lutosławski – Chantefleurs et Chantefables
- Kaija Saariaho – ...à la Fumée
- John Serry Sr. –
  - A Savior Is Born, for organ and voice
  - Dreams Trilogy, for piano
  - La Culebra, for solo flute
- Karlheinz Stockhausen –
  - Elufa, for flute and basset horn, with electronic music ad lib., 9. ex Nr. 64
  - Freia, for flute ex 9 1/2 Nr. 64
- Joan Tower – Concerto for Orchestra
- Takashi Yoshimatsu
  - Sagittarius Ecologue for bassoon and harp
  - Symphony No. 2 "at Terra" for orchestra
  - Fuzzy Bird Sonata for saxophone and piano
  - 3 White Landscapes for flute, bassoon, and harp
  - Wind Color Vector for Guitar

== Opera ==
- John Adams – The Death of Klinghoffer, first performance on 19 March at the Théatre Royal de la Monnaie, Brussels, Belgium
- Harrison Birtwistle – Gawain, first performance on 30 May at the Royal Opera House, London
- Daniel Catán – Rappaccini's Daughter (La hija de Rappaccini)
- John Corigliano – The Ghosts of Versailles
- Meredith Monk – Atlas

== Musical theater ==
- Miss Saigon (Claude-Michel Schönberg and Alain Boublil) – Broadway production opened at the Broadway Theatre on 11 April and ran for 4097 performances
- The Secret Garden – Broadway production opened at the St. James Theatre on 25 April and ran for 706 performances
- Song of Singapore – off-Broadway production opened at the Irving Plaza on 7 May and ran for 459 performances
- Will Rogers Follies – Broadway production opened at the Palace Theatre on 1 May and ran for 983 performances

== Musical films ==
- Beauty and the Beast (animated feature)
- The Commitments
- The Five Heartbeats
- For the Boys
- Kilukkam
- Stepping Out
- Stones at the Max
- El Acompañamiento
- Thalapathi

== Births ==
- 8 January
  - Asuka Hinoi Japanese singer
  - Shin Ji-min, South Korean singer and rapper
- 9 January – 3lau, American DJ and producer
- 12 January – Pixie Lott, British singer-songwriter and actress
- 13 January – Goo Hara, Korean singer (Kara) (d. 2019)
- 14 January – Cat Torres, Australian singer-songwriter, musician, contestant on The Voice (Australia)
- 23 January – Torres, American independent singer-songwriter, musician and artist
- 28 January – C. J. Harris, American singer (d. 2023)
- 30 January – Reinier Zonneveld, Dutch DJ and record producer
- 1 February – Martha Heredia, Dominican singer
- 7 February – Gabbie Hanna, American rapper, singer, musician, comedienne and author
- 8 February – Nam Woo-hyun, South Korean singer, dancer and actor
- 10 February
  - Ceng De Ping, Taiwanese singer
  - Emma Roberts, American actress and singer
- 11 February – Christofer Ingle, American indie rock singer-guitarist and painter (Never Shout Never)
- 12 February – Casey Abrams, American singer-songwriter and guitarist
- 14 February – Karol G, Colombian singer-songwriter
- 15 February – Maruv, Ukrainian singer-songwriter and record producer
- 17 February – Ed Sheeran, British singer-songwriter and businessmen (working with Taylor Swift, Anne-Marie, Nina Nesbitt, Camila Cabello, Tori Kelly, Kasey Chambers, Stormzy, Cardi B and Maisie Peters)
- 21 February
  - Allday, Australian musician, rapper and singer-songwriter (The Veronicas, Troye Sivan)
  - William Bowery, British musician, producer and songwriter on Folklore, Evermore and Midnights by Taylor Swift
  - Solar, South Korean singer-songwriter and actress (Mamamoo)
- 24 February
  - Tyler Bryant, American rock musician (Tyler Bryant & the Shakedown, Dead Cool Dropouts, Lisa Origliasso, The Veronicas)
  - O'Shea Jackson Jr., American rapper, songwriter and actor
- 26 February
  - CL, South Korean singer-songwriter and rapper
  - Lee Chang-sub, South Korean singer
- 4 March – Sarah Bonito, British-Japanese singer, lead vocalist of Kero Kero Bonito
- 6 March – Tyler, the Creator, American rapper and record producer
- 8 March – Devon Werkheiser, American actor and musician
- 10 March – Kenshi Yonezu, Japanese musician, singer-songwriter and record producer
- 11 March
  - Chingiz Mustafayev, Azerbaijani singer-songwriter and guitarist
  - Qian Lin, Chinese singer
- 13 March – Luan Santana, Brazilian singer-songwriter
- 16 March – Wolfgang Van Halen, American bassist
- 25 March
  - Liang Bo, Chinese singer-songwriter
  - Kevin Garrett, American musician, working with Alessia Cara
- March 26 – Ari Lennox, American R&B singer
- March 27 – London on da Track, American record producer, rapper and songwriter (Summer Walker)
- 28 March
  - Amy Bruckner, American actress and singer
  - Hoya, South Korean singer and actor
  - Jutes, Canadian musician and singer-songwriter
- 29 March – Irene, South Korean singer and actress (Red Velvet)
- 30 March
  - Joey Cook, American singer
  - NF, American rapper
- 2 April – Quavo, American rapper and frontman of hip-hop trio Migos
- 3 April – Hayley Kiyoko, American singer-songwriter, advocate and dancer
- 4 April
  - Jesse Jo Stark, American singer-songwriter
  - Lucas Lucco, Brazilian singer-songwriter
  - Jamie Lynn Spears, American television personality, comedienne, actress and singer
- 7 April – Anne-Marie, British singer-songwriter, dancer, activist and musician
- 10 April – Amanda Michalka (AJ), American singer-songwriter, musician and actress
- 15 April – Daiki Arioka, Japanese singer (Hey! Say! JUMP)
- 18 April
  - Joey Gaydos, American actor and guitarist
  - Edgar Barrera, Mexican-American songwriter, producer and musician, based in Miami, Florida.
- 23 April – Caleb Johnson, American singer
- 27 April – Eric Fukusaki, Peruvian singer based in Japan
- 30 April – Lindsay Pearce, American singer and actress
- 10 May – Ray Dalton, American singer-songwriter
- 12 May – Jennifer Damiano, American actress and singer
- 16 May – Joey Graceffa, American YouTuber, vlogger, actor, author, producer and musician
- 17 May
  - Daniel Curtis Lee, American actor and rapper
  - DJ Akademiks, Jamaican hip-hop blogger
  - Adil Omar, Pakistani rapper and producer
- 18 May – Spellling, American singer
- 19 May – Jordan Pruitt, American singer
- 20 May – Bastian Baker, Swiss singer-songwriter and performer
- 22 May
  - Brooke Simpson, American singer-songwriter
  - Suho, South Korean singer (Exo)
- 23 May – Lena Meyer-Landrut, German singer-songwriter and dancer
- 24 May – Erika Umeda, Japanese singer
- 25 May – Guy Lawrence, garage musician (EDM House, Disclosure)
- 26 May
  - Amber Bondin, Maltese singer
  - Channel Tres, American singer-songwriter, rapper and record producer
- 27 May – Channii, Dutch singer-songwriter
- 29 May
  - Kristen Alderson, American actress and singer
  - Matoma, Norwegian DJ and record producer
- 31 May – Azealia Banks, American rapper, singer and songwriter
- 6 June – Ashley Park, American actress, singer and dancer
- 7 June – Fetty Wap, American rapper
- 12 June – Jessie Reyez, Colombian-Canadian singer-songwriter
- 14 June – Jesy Nelson, English singer-songwriter and dancer (Little Mix, later solo)
- 16 June
  - Lim Young-woong, South Korean trot singer
  - Joe McElderry, British singer
- 17 June – Shura, British singer-songwriter, musician and producer
- 20 June – Hannah Diamond, British singer-songwriter and visual artist
- 23 June – Katie Armiger, American singer
- 24 June – Max Ehrich, American singer, actor and dancer
- 27 June – Rayvon Owen, American singer
- 28 June – Seohyun, member of South Korean pop girl group Girls' Generation
- 29 June – Caleidra, British singer-songwriter
- 30 June – MC Davo, Mexican rapper, singer and composer
- 1 July – Sanah Moidutty, Indian singer-songwriter
- 2 July – Burna Boy, Nigerian singer-songwriter and record producer
- 3 July – Peggy Gou, South Korean DJ, singer-songwriter and record producer
- 5 July – Sam Fischer, Australian singer-songwriter, producer and musician (Demi Lovato)
- 7 July – Alesso, Swedish producer and DJ
- 9 July
  - Clara Hagman, Swedish singer-songwriter (Ace of Base)
  - Adrianne Lenker, American singer-songwriter and guitarist
  - Mitchel Musso, American actor and musician
- 10 July
  - María Chacón, Mexican actress and singer
  - Angel Haze, American rapper and singer-songwriter
- 12 July – Dexter Roberts, American singer
- 15 July – Yuki Kashiwagi, Japanese idol singing group member
- 16 July – Emma Louise, Australian indie-pop singer-songwriter
- 17 July – Mann, American rapper
- 18 July – Karina Pasian, American Russian multilingual classical musician and singer
- 21 July – Lucy Spraggan, British singer-songwriter
- 26 July – Nathan Hartono, Singaporean singer and actor
- 29 July – Miki Ishikawa, American actress and singer
- 30 July
  - David Carreira, Portuguese singer, model and actor
  - Diana Vickers, British singer
- 31 July – Abhay Jodhpurkar, Indian singer
- 1 August – Kelsy Karter, New Zealand singer-songwriter
- 9 August
  - Candela Vetrano, Argentine actress, singer and model
  - Heize, South Korean singer-songwriter and rapper
- 11 August – Milica Pavlović, Swiss-born Serbian singer
- 13 August – Dave Days, American singer-songwriter and guitarist
- 21 August
  - Tess Gaerthé, Dutch singer and actress
  - Jesse Rutherford, American singer and musician
- 26 August – Alok, Brazilian DJ and record producer
- 30 August – Guru Randhawa, Indian singer-songwriter and composer
- 3 September
  - Moneybagg Yo, American rapper
  - Terence Lam, Hong Kong singer-songwriter
  - Samantha Marie Ware (Sameya), American theatre and TV actress and singer
- 8 September
  - Nicole Dollanganger, Canadian singer-songwriter, activist and artist (Lana Del Rey, Grimes)
  - Alex Kinsey, American singer-songwriter and instrumentalist (Alex & Sierra)
- 9 September – Hunter Hayes, American country singer
- 11 September – Kygo, Norwegian producer and DJ
- 12 September – Imri Ziv, Israeli singer-songwriter
- 15 September – Alex Florea, Romanian singer
- 16 September – Noname, American singer-songwriter, rapper, musician and poet
- 22 September – Chelsea Tavares, American actress and singer
- 23 September – Key, South Korean singer and actor
- 26 September – Ant Clemons, American singer-songwriter and rapper
- 27 September – Rachel Cheung, Hong Kong classical pianist
- 1 October – Via Vallen, Indonesian dangdut singer
- 4 October
  - Nicolai Kielstrup, Danish singer
  - Leigh-Anne Pinnock, English singer-songwriter, dancer, activist and philanthropist (Little Mix)
- 5 October – Betty Who, Australian singer-songwriter
- 7 October – Lay Zhang, Chinese singer-songwriter, record producer, director and dancer (EXO)
- 6 October – Roshon Fegan, American actor, singer and rapper
- 10 October
  - Gabriella Cilmi, Australian-Italian blues and pop singer-songwriter
  - Lali Espósito, Argentine actress, singer-songwriter, dancer and model
- 11 October – Joey Walker, Australian musician, singer and producer (King Gizzard & the Lizard Wizard)
- 17 October – Brenda Asnicar, Argentine actress and singer
- 18 October – Tyler Posey, American musician and actor
- 19 October – Colton Dixon, American singer
- 22 October – Arianna Afsar, American musician
- 29 October – Parris Goebel, New Zealand-born choreographer, dancer, singer, director and actress
- 31 October – Jordan-Claire Green, American actress and musician
- 5 November – Flume, Australian record producer, musician and DJ
- 8 November – Riker Lynch, American actor, singer and bassist
- 10 November – Elina Nechayeva, Estonian soprano
- 11 November – Emma Blackery, British singer-songwriter, musician, comedienne, entertainer, YouTuber, streamer, beauty blogger and gaming blogger
- 13 November – Matt Bennett, American actor and singer (Victorious, Ariana Grande)
- 14 November – Gallant, American musician
- 18 November – Tommy Cash, Estonian rapper, singer, dancer and visual artist
- 22 November – Saki Shimizu, Japanese singer
- 25 November – Kevin Woo, American-South Korean singer and dancer (U-KISS, Xing)
- 28 November – Hannah Diamond, English singer-songwriter, photographer, musician, producer and visual artist (Charli XCX, A G Cook)
- 2 December
  - Charlie Puth, American singer-songwriter, musician and record producer
  - Ainsley Melham, Australian singer, dancer and actor
- 6 December – Ejae, South Korean and American singer-songwriter
- 7 December
  - Remi Matsuo, Japanese singer-songwriter and artist (Glim Spanky)
  - Dori Sakurada, Japanese actor and singer
- 9 December
  - PnB Rock, American hip-hop recording artist (d. 2022)
  - Choi Min-ho, South Korean singer (Shinee)
- 11 December – Anna Bergendahl Swedish-Irish singer
- 12 December – Jasmine Murray, American singer
- 13 December
  - Jay Greenberg, American composer
  - Dermot Kennedy, Irish singer-songwriter and musician
- 14 December
  - Offset, American rapper and member of hip-hop trio Migos
  - Stefflon Don, British-Jamaican rapper and singer-songwriter
- 15 December – Alana Haim, American guitarist, singer, keyboardist, musician and actress (Haim)
- 19 December
  - Tom Walker, Scottish singer-songwriter (Zara Larsson, Dodie)
  - Jack River, Australian singer-songwriter, musician and producer
- 19 December
  - Declan Galbraith, British singer
  - Keiynan Lonsdale, Australian actor, dancer and singer-songwriter
- 22 December – DaBaby, American rapper
- 23 December – YoungstaCPT, South African rapper
- 24 December – Louis Tomlinson, English singer-songwriter and television personality. (One Direction)
- 27 December – Chloe Bridges, American actress, singer and pianist
- 30 December – Tyler Carter, American singer-songwriter and rapper (Issues, Woe Is Me)
- Date not known
  - DallasK, American music producer and songwriter
  - Sylvaine, Norwegian metal multi-instrumentalist

== Deaths ==
- 1 January – Buck Ram, American singer and songwriter (The Platters), 83
- 6 January – Ahmed Adnan Saygun, Turkish composer and musicologist, 83
- 8 January – Steve Clark, guitarist of Def Leppard, 30 (overdose of codeine)
- 14 January – Chitragupta, film composer, 73
- 20 January – Stan Szelest, keyboard player (The Band), 47
- 6 February – Danny Thomas, singer and actor, 79
- 9 February – James Cleveland, gospel singer, 59
- 13 February – Flaviano Labò, operatic tenor, 64
- 17 February – Gitta Alpár, operatic soprano, 88
- 20 February – Isabelle Delorme, pianist, composer and music teacher, 90
- 21 February – Margot Fonteyn, ballerina, 71
- 26 February – Slim Gaillard, jazz musician, 75
- 2 March – Serge Gainsbourg, singer-songwriter, 62 (heart attack)
- 6 March – Sir Joseph Lockwood, record company executive, 86
- 13 March – Jimmy McPartland, jazz musician, 83
- 14 March
  - Howard Ashman, lyricist, 40 (AIDS-related)
  - Jerome Doc Pomus, songwriter, 65
- 15 March – Bud Freeman, jazz musician, 84
- 18 March – Dezider Kardoš, Slovak composer, 76
- 21 March – Leo Fender, inventor of the electric guitar, 81
- 25 March – Eileen Joyce, pianist, 83
- 1 April – Martha Graham, American dancer and choreographer, 96
- 4 April – Louiguy, Spanish-born French composer, 75
- 7 April
  - Henry Glover, American songwriter, producer and trumpet player, 69
  - Ruth Page, American ballerina and choreographer, 92
- 8 April – Per Yngve Ohlin, aka 'Dead', vocalist of Mayhem, 22 (suicide)
- 13 April – Wilhelm Lanzky-Otto, horn virtuoso, 82
- 17 April – Jack Yellen, American lyricist, 98
- 18 April – Barry Rogers, American jazz and salsa trombonist, 55
- 20 April – Steve Marriott, singer-songwriter and guitarist (Small Faces and Humble Pie), 44 (killed in house fire)
- 21 April – Willi Boskovsky, conductor, 81
- 23 April – Johnny Thunders, rock guitarist and singer, 38 (drug-related)
- 26 April
  - Leo Arnaud, composer, 86
  - Carmine Coppola, flautist and composer, 80
- 28 April – Ken Curtis, American singer and actor, 74
- 29 April – Gonzaguinha, Brazilian singer and composer, 45 (car accident)
- 3 May – Mohammed Abdel Wahab, Egyptian singer and composer, 89
- 8 May
  - Jean Langlais, composer, 84
  - Rudolf Serkin, pianist, 88
- 9 May? – Yanka Dyagileva, poet and singer, 24 (drowned)
- 19 May – Odia Coates, singer, 49 (breast cancer)
- 23 May – Wilhelm Kempff, pianist and composer, 95
- 24 May
  - Gene Clark, American singer-songwriter (The Byrds), 46 (heart attack)
  - Dirk Schoufs, Belgian jazz double bass player Vaya Con Dios, 29 (AIDS-related)
- 27 May – Leopold Nowak, musicologist, 86
- 1 June – David Ruffin, singer (The Temptations), 50 (overdose of cocaine)
- 4 June – MC Trouble, rapper, 20 (epileptic seizure)
- 6 June – Stan Getz, US saxophonist, 64
- 9 June – Claudio Arrau, pianist, 88
- 14 June – Joy Finzi, founder of the Finzi Trust, 84
- 6 July – Herminio Giménez, composer, 86
- 11 July – Honorata de la Rama, singer, 89
- 15 July – Bert Convy, American game show host, actor and singer, 57 (brain tumor)
- 10 August – Anthony A. Bliss, executive director and general manager of the Metropolitan Opera, 78
- 28 August – Vince Taylor, rock and roll singer, 52 (cancer)
- 4 September
  - Charlie Barnet, American bandleader, 77
  - Dottie West, American country singer, 58 (car accident)
- 8 September – Alex North, composer, 80
- 17 September
  - Zino Francescatti, violinist, 89
  - Rob Tyner, lead singer of MC5, 46 (heart attack)
- 20 September – Tom Anderson, Shetland fiddler
- 22 September – Tino Casal, Spanish rock singer, 41 (car accident)
- 25 September – Sydney MacEwan, singer of traditional Scottish and Irish songs, 82
- 28 September
  - Eugène Bozza, composer, 86
  - Miles Davis, jazz trumpeter and composer, 65 (stroke)
- 6 October – Igor Talkov, Russian singer-songwriter, 34 (murdered)
- 9 October – Roy Black, 48, singer and actor (heart failure)
- 16 October – Ole Beich, guitarist and bassist, 36 (drowned)
- 17 October – Tennessee Ernie Ford, country musician, 72
- 25 October – Bill Graham, rock concert promoter, 60 (helicopter crash)
- 27 October – Sir Andrzej Panufnik, Polish composer, 75
- 31 October
  - Garvin Bushell,Jazz multi-instrumentalist, 89
  - Joseph Papp, Broadway producer, 70
- 2 November – Mort Shuman, songwriter, 54 (complications following liver operation)
- 3 November – Chris Bender, R&B singer, 19 (murdered)
- 8 November – Frances Faye, singer, 79
- 11 November – Morton Stevens, film composer, 62
- 15 November – Jacques Morali, disco composer, 44 (AIDS)
- 24 November
  - Eric Carr, drummer, 41 (cancer)
  - Freddie Mercury, singer, 45 (AIDS-related)
- 10 December – Headman Shabalala, member of Ladysmith Black Mambazo, 46 (shot)
- 13 December
  - Marcelle Bunlet, French soprano, 91
  - Stuart Challender, conductor, 44 (AIDS-related)
- 20 December
  - Lal Chand Yamla Jatt, Indian folk singer, 77
  - Waldemar Kazanecki, Polish pianist, conductor and composer, 62
- 22 December – Édouard Woolley, tenor, actor, composer and music educator, 75

== Awards ==
- Country Music Hall of Fame Inductees: Felice and Boudleaux Bryant
- Rock and Roll Hall of Fame Inductees: LaVern Baker, The Byrds, John Lee Hooker, The Impressions, Wilson Pickett, Jimmy Reed and Ike and Tina Turner
- 1991 Country Music Association Awards
- 1991 Grammy Awards
- 1991 MTV Video Music Awards
- Eurovision Song Contest 1991
- Kumar Sanu – Filmfare Best Male Playback Award
- 33rd Japan Record Awards

== Charts ==
- List of Billboard Hot 100 number ones of 1991
- 1991 in British music#Charts
- List of Oricon number-one singles of 1991

== See also ==
- 1991 in music (UK)
- Record labels established in 1991
