= Ellen James =

Ellen James may refer to:

- Ellen James, the fictional inspiration for a feminist community, the Ellen Jamesians, in the novel The World According to Garp
- Ellen James Society, an Atlanta-based rock band which drew its name from the fictional character
