= Le Jerk! =

"Le Jerk !"

Single by Thierry Hazard

from the album Pop Music
- B-side: "Goodbye Mary"
- Released: 1989; 1990
- Recorded: 1989
- Studio: Studio Oncle Sam (recording); Studio ICP (mixing)
- Genre: Pop
- Length: 3:58
- Label: CBS
- Songwriter: Thierry Hazard
- Producers: Thierry Hazard, Daniel Glikmans

Thierry Hazard singles chronology
"Poupée psychédélique" (1988)	"Le Jerk !" (1989)	"Poupée psychédélique" (1990)

"Le Jerk !" is a 1989 song recorded by French musician Thierry Hazard. It is the first single from his debut album Pop Music and was one of the 1990 summer hits in France. It is also Hazard's signature song, although he has released other successful songs.

== Background ==
"Le Jerk !" was written by Hazard, ans produced by Daniel Glikmans. It was first released as a single in 1989, but passed unnoticed, as well as for the previous single, "Poupée psychédélique", in 1988, but was re-released the following year, at the start of the summer. The song's title refers to a 1970s popular dance and was also used for Hazard's best of album, Le Jerk, released in July 2001. The single's cover was made by French designer Serge Clerc. The role of Roger is played by Christophe Salengro, a French actor and dancer.

== Lyrics and music ==
"Le Jerk !" was a huge success in the French discothèques. Elia Habib, a specialist of the French charts, considers that this is due to the "modern and lively writing" of the song. Lyrically, it deals with the story of two characters, named Joséphine and Roger, who have a routine life (she works as a secretary, he works in a factory). Both are eagerly awaiting the end of each day to take the bus to go dancing the jerk at 'Le Club à Gogo'. There, they meet, fall in love, get married and give birth to quadruplets, named Gustave, Alphonse, Arthur and Philibert. Thus, the jerk had saved from their monotonous universe and made them able to discover love.

The song has been accused of plagiarism by the publisher of Jean-Jacques Goldman, as the song's refrain is similar to that of "Quand la musique est bonne", but the court action was cancelled.

Two black female vocalists also participate in the chorus and appear in the music video.

== Chart performance ==
In France, the single debuted at number 38 on the chart edition of 16 June 1990, almost did not stop to climb on the chart every week and eventually reached a peak of number two on 27 October, in his 20th week of presence, just behind UB40's hit "Kingston Town". It remained for 17 weeks in the top ten and 27 weeks on the chart, making the song one of the most successful hits of the year. The single was certified Gold disc by the Syndicat National de l'Édition Phonographique, the French certifier, for over 400,000 copies sold.

On the European Hot 100 Singles, "Le Jerk !" debuted at number 97 on 14 July 1990, reached a peak of number 14 in the 18th week and fell off the top 100 after 23 weeks of presence. It ranked at number 50 on the year-end chart.

== Track listings ==
- CD single
1. "Le Jerk !" — 3:58
2. "Goodbye Mary" — 4:19
- 7″ single
1. "Le Jerk !" — 3:58
2. "Goodbye Mary" — 4:19
- 12″ maxi
1. "Le Jerk !" (remix club) — 8:11
2. "Le Jerk !" — 3:58
- Promo 7″ single - Spain
1. "Le Jerk !" — 3:58

== Charts and certifications ==
=== Weekly charts ===
Chart (1990)	Peak position
Europe (European Airplay Top 50)	50
Europe (European Hot 100)	14
France (SNEP)	2

=== Year-end charts ===
Chart (1990)	Position
Europe (Eurochart Hot 100)	50

=== Certifications ===
Certifications for "Le Jerk !"
Region	Certification	Certified units/sales
France (SNEP)	Gold	400,000^{*}
^{*} Sales figures based on certification alone.

== Release history ==
Country	Date	Format	Label
France, Belgium	1989	CD single	CBS
France, Belgium	1989	7″ single	CBS
France, Belgium	1989	12″ maxi	CBS
Spain	1990	Promotional 7″ single	CBS
