= Pearl of Great Price =

Pearl of Great Price may refer to:

- Parable of the Pearl, a parable told by Jesus in explaining the value of the Kingdom of Heaven
- Pearl (poem), a Middle English alliterative poem written in the late 14th century
- Pearl of Great Price (Mormonism), part of the standard works of The Church of Jesus Christ of Latter-day Saints
- Pearl of Great Price (album), 1991 album by industrial music band Will

== See also ==
- Hymn of the Pearl, a passage of the apocryphal Acts of Thomas
