= Déjà-Vu (Will album) =

Compilation album by Will
- Released: February 15, 2000
- Recorded: 1987 – 1992
- Genre: Dark wave, martial industrial
- Length: 71:18
- Label: COP Int'l.
- Producer: Michael Balch, Rhys Fulber, Chris Peterson

Will chronology
Word•Flesh•Stone (1992)	Déjà-Vu (2000)

Déjà-Vu is a compilation album by Will, released on February 15, 2000, by COP International. It comprises most of the band's previously released output, with the exceptions of the tracks "New Mass" from Pearl of Great Price and "Father Forgive" from Word•Flesh•Stone. The album peaked at No. 26 on the CMJ RPM Charts in the U.S.

== Track listing ==
All lyrics are written by John McRae; all music is composed by Will.

No.	Title	Length
1.	"Summoning"	3:13
2.	"Crowning Glory"	5:24
3.	"Exhaust Inhibits"	3:44
4.	"Sacrement of Penance"	5:19
5.	"Crusade"	4:12
6.	"Visible Second Coming"	5:09
7.	"Furnace of Souls"	4:08
8.	"Father Forgive" (remix)	4:35
9.	"Crimson Flow"	4:46
10.	"Epilogue"	3:38
11.	"Measures Remedial"	4:14
12.	"Furnace Rekindled"	4:58
13.	"All Victorious"	4:21
14.	"Triumph"	3:39
15.	"Kingdom Come"	4:19
16.	"Souls of the Valiant"	5:38

== Personnel ==
Adapted from the Déjà-Vu liner notes.

Will

- Rhys Fulber – keyboard, drum programming, production, engineering
- John McRae – vocals, art direction
- Chris Peterson – keyboard, production, engineering
- Jeff Stoddard – electric guitar (1–11)

Production and additional personnel

- Kelly Alm – design
- Michael Balch – engineering, production (1–11)
- John Dennison – photography
- Christian Hell – design
- Gunnar Schreck – cover art
