= Back on the Bus, Y'all =

Live album by Indigo Girls
- Released: June 4, 1991
- Recorded: 1991
- Genre: Rock
- Length: 38:54
- Label: Epic
- Producer: Scott Litt

Indigo Girls chronology
Nomads Indians Saints (1990)	Back on the Bus, Y'all (1991)	Rites of Passage (1992)

Professional ratings
Review scores
Source	Rating
Allmusic	2/5 stars

Back on the Bus, Y'all is Indigo Girls' first live album and fourth overall, released in 1991.

== Track listing ==
1. "1 2 3" (Scott Bland, Bryan Lilje, Chris McGuire, Amy Ray, Cooper Seay) – 4:30
2. "Tried to Be True" (Ray) – 2:55
3. "You and Me of the 10,000 Wars" (Emily Saliers) – 4:21
4. "Prince of Darkness" (Saliers) – 6:00
5. "Kid Fears" (Ray) – 4:57
6. "Left Me a Fool" (Saliers) – 5:30
7. "All Along the Watchtower" (Bob Dylan) – 6:26
8. "1 2 3" (Studio version) (Bland, Lilje, McGuire, Ray, Seay) – 4:15

== Personnel ==
Indigo Girls

- Amy Ray – rhythm guitar, acoustic guitar, vocals
- Emily Saliers – rhythm guitar, acoustic guitar, lead guitar, vocals

Ellen James Society

- Scott Bland – drums (1, 2, 5, 8)
- Bryan Lilje – bass (1, 2, 8)
- Chris McGuire – rhythm guitar, vocals (1, 2, 5, 8)
- Cooper Seay – electric guitar, rhythm guitar, vocals (1, 2, 5, 8)

Other musicians

- Sara Lee – bass (3–6)
- Barbara Marino – saxophone (6)
- Simone Simonton – drums (3)
