= Word Flesh Stone =

EP by Will
- Released: October 26, 1992
- Recorded: 1992
- Studio: East Third Avenue Studio, Vancouver, B.C.
- Genre: Dark wave, martial industrial
- Length: 27:37
- Label: Third Mind
- Producer: Rhys Fulber, Chris Peterson

Will chronology
Pearl of Great Price (1991)	Word Flesh Stone (1992)	Déjà-Vu (2000)

Professional ratings
Review scores
Source	Rating
The Connector	Favorable

Word Flesh Stone (stylized as Word•Flesh•Stone) is an EP by Will, released on October 26, 1992, by Third Mind Records. In an interview with Music From the Empty Quarter, Rhys Fulber said he was more pleased with the music Word Flesh Stone as it was more representative of the band's sound when it was released in contrast to Pearl of Great Price, which was recorded over a three-year period.

== Track listing ==
All lyrics are written by John McRae; all music is composed by Rhys Fulber, John McRae and Chris Peterson.

No.	Title	Length
1.	"Furnace Rekindled"	5:00
2.	"Father Forgive"	4:36
3.	"All Victorious"	4:21
4.	"Triumph"	3:41
5.	"Kingdom Come"	4:20
6.	"Souls of the Valiant"	5:39

== Personnel ==
Adapted from the Word Flesh Stone liner notes.

Will

- Rhys Fulber – keyboard, drum programming, production, engineering
- John McRae – vocals, art direction
- Chris Peterson – keyboard, production, engineering

Production and additional personnel

- Michael Balch – engineering
- John Dennison – photography
