= Angelina (PSY song) =

1991 single by PSY

Single by PSY

from the album Être ange, mon ange
- B-side: "Un baiser..."
- Released: 1991
- Recorded: 1990
- Studio: Studio Armada
- Genre: Pop
- Length: 4:00
- Label: Ariola
- Songwriters: Pierre Perez-Vergara, Stéphane Planchon, Yassine Dahbi
- Producer: Robert Levy-Provençal

PSY singles chronology
"Laisse-moi jouer" (1989)	"Angelina" (1991)	"Mahler de malheur" (1992)

"Angelina" is a 1990 song recorded by French band PSY. Written by members Pierre Perez-Vergara, Stéphane Planchon and Yassine Dahbi, this pop song was released in 1991 as the first single from the band's album Être ange, mon ange, produced by Robert Levy-Provençal and which provided the singles "Mahler de malheur" and "Animal moi" too. Directed by Frédéric Planchon, the music video for "Angelina" shows a model named Maïwenn, also known as Polisse. In France, it was a top ten hit and became PSY's only charting single in the country, making the band a one-hit wonder.

== Reception ==
A review in Pan-European magazine Music & Media presented "Angelina" like this: "Three inspired young French men exert themselves to the utmost, for what must be the most beautiful girl in the world. In the meantime, the song encourages you to dance your legs off". Expert of the French charts Elia Habib noted the "synthetic and harmonious sound" of the song.

In France, "Angelina" debuted at number 43 on the chart edition of 28 September 1991, then climb every week to reach number nine in its sixth week and stayed in the top 50 for 12 weeks. It entered the European Hot 100 Singles at number 63 on 9 November 1992 and remained for five weeks on the chart, with a peak at number 49 in the second week.

Although written in French-language, "Angelina" became popular in the Philippines and was released in the country after being parodied multiple times, as the original text was replaced by risque lyrics which describe Angelina as a dirty woman who does not wash her intimate parts.

== Track listings ==
- 7" single - France, Philippines
1. "Angelina" — 4:00
2. "Le Baiser..." — 4:40
- 12" maxi - France, Philippines
1. "Angelina" (RLP mix) — 6:52
2. "Angelina" (extended version) — 6:28
3. "Angelina" (dub mix) — 3:40
- CD maxi - France
1. "Angelina" (single mix) — 4:04
2. "Angelina" (acoustic mix) — 3:35
3. "Le Baiser..." (single mix) — 4:40
4. "Angelina" (extended mix) — 6:28
5. "Angelina" (RLP mix) — 6:52
- Cassette - France
1. "Angelina" — 4:00
2. "Le Baiser..." — 4:40

== Personnel ==
- Arrangement, direction – Pierre Perez-Vergara
- Arrangement, directed, mixing – Stéphane Planchon
- Design – FKGB
- Mixing – JPB ("Le Baiser...")
- Mixing – Steve Jackson
- Photography – Youri Lenquette
- Production – Robert Lévy-Provençal
- Saxophone – David Wilczewski ("Le Baiser...")
- Vocals, pap – Julie Gay ("Le Baiser...")
- Writing, composition – PSY

== Charts ==
Chart (1991–1992)	Peak position
Europe (European Hot 100)	49
France (Airplay Chart [AM Stations])	13
France (SNEP)	9
Quebec (ADISQ)	13
