= Tout c'qui nous sépare =

Single by Jil Caplan

from the album La Charmeuse de serpents
- B-side: "Ta Voix"
- Released: March 1991
- Recorded: 1990
- Genre: Pop
- Label: Epic, Sony Music
- Songwriter(s): Jay Alansky
- Producer(s): Jay Alansky

Jil Caplan singles chronology
"Tard dans la nuit" (1989)	"Tout c'qui nous sépare" (1991)	"Natalie Wood" (1991)

"Tout c'qui nous sépare" (English: "All That Separates Us") is a 1991 pop song recorded by French singer Jil Caplan, released as CD single in March 1991. It was the first single from her second studio album, La Charmeuse de serpents, released a few months earlier, on which it appeared as second track. Written and composed by Jay Alansky, the song became a top ten hit in France and remains Caplan's most successful single in terms of sales and chart performances. It was later included on the singer's 1998 greatest hits album, Jours de fête.

== Background, music and lyrics ==
When she listened to the song for the first time, Caplan said: "It [was] a love at first sight. I love this song deeply, its lyrics, its images. (...) It is a perfect echo of my journey in the American West." Composer and producer Jay Alansky, who felt that the song was a potential hit, had stage fright when he recorded the guitar in the studio and thus had to restart several times.

The music video was shot in 1991 in the United States, in the Canyon de Chelly and on the shores of the Lake Powell, Utah. It was directed by Éric Mulet and is composed images showing Caplan in a funfair and in natural settings.

According to Elia Habib, an expert of French charts, "the characteristic timbre of the singer gets married with the sound of a special slide guitar and a harmonica. (...) [The] song chorus [is] marked by a changing chorus, showing solidarity with the verses in which it fits closely and continuity". Regarding the theme, the French newspaper Libération said the song "talks about a separation through sound words, without falling into sadness".

In 2007, sixteen years after the release of the song, Caplan said: "I absolutely do not deny this song which was pretty well built. It has luminous lyrics, which for me is the memory of a great time." In 2011, she proved it by covering the song in a more acoustic version on her album Revue which was released on 3 May 2011.

== Critical reception ==
"Tout c'qui nous sépare" was frequently aired on French radios and Caplan reached her peak of popularity. The song helped Caplan to win an award at the Victoires de la Musique in 1992 in the category 'popular music female révélation of the year'. On this occasion, she performed the song in a live version.

When reviewing the parent album, Music & Media stated that the song is "an interesting mix of typical chanson and C&W. The slide guitar of the very talented Yann Pechin and the harmonica of Baco Mikaelian give the song a greater emotional depth".

In France, the song can be deemed as a sleeper hit, as it debuted at number 50 on 23 March 1991 and finally peaked at number six for two non-consecutive weeks. The song totalled seven weeks in the top ten and 18 weeks in the top 50. The same year, it earned a silver disc, awarded by the Syndicat National de l'Édition Phonographique, for 125,000 units.

== Cover version ==
In December 2010, French singer La Fiancée released an EP on which the second track is a cover version of "Tout c'qui nous sépare".

== Track listings ==
- CD single
1. "Tout c'qui nous sépare" – 4:20
2. "Ta voix" – 3:58
- 7" single
1. "Tout c'qui nous sépare" – 4:20
2. "Ta voix" – 3:58

== Charts and sales ==
=== Weekly charts ===
Chart (1991)	Peak position
Europe (European Airplay Top 50)	44
Europe (Eurochart Hot 100 Singles)	36
France (Airplay Chart [AM Stations])	4
France (SNEP)	6

=== Certifications ===
Certifications for "Tout c'qui nous sépare"
Region	Certification	Certified units/sales
France (SNEP)	Silver	125,000^{*}
^{*} Sales figures based on certification alone.
