= 1991 in South Korean music =

The following is a list of notable events and releases that happened in 1991 in music in South Korea.

== Debuting and disbanded in 1991 ==
=== Soloists ===
- Jang Hye-jin
- Kim Jang-hoon
- Yim Jae-beom
- Yoon Jong-shin

=== Disbanded groups ===
- Sinawe

== Releases in 1991 ==
=== January ===
| Date | Title | Artist | Genre(s) |
|---|---|---|---|
| 26 | Kim Hyun Sik Vol.6 | Kim Hyun-sik | Folk rock |

=== February ===
| Date | Title | Artist | Genre(s) |

=== March ===
| Date | Title | Artist | Genre(s) |
|---|---|---|---|
| 20 | Myself | Shin Hae-chul | Rock |
| 20 | The Wandering (방황) | Lee Seung-chul | Soft rock |
| 30 | Kim Kwang-seok 2nd | Kim Kwang-seok | Folk rock |

=== April ===
| Date | Title | Artist | Genre(s) |
|---|---|---|---|
| 20 | The Dreams | Cho Yong-pil | Folk-pop |

=== May ===
| Date | Title | Artist | Genre(s) |
|---|---|---|---|
| 12 | Like the First Time We Met | Yoon Jong-shin | Ballad |

=== June ===
| Date | Title | Artist | Genre(s) |

=== July ===
| Date | Title | Artist | Genre(s) |
|---|---|---|---|
| 1 | Dreaming Park | Sanulrim | Rock |
| 1 | Woman | Insooni | R&B |
| — | Second Episode | 015B | R&B |

=== August ===
| Date | Title | Artist | Genre(s) |

=== September ===
| Date | Title | Artist | Genre(s) |
|---|---|---|---|
| 1 | The Wandering | Lee Seung-chul | Soft rock |
| 15 | Vol 1 always between you and I | Kim Jang-hoon | K-pop |
| 17 | Old Love | Lee Moon-sae | Korean ballad |

=== October ===
| Date | Title | Artist | Genre(s) |
|---|---|---|---|
| 1 | On the Turning Away | Yim Jae-beom | Rock |
| 30 | The Reason to Be With You | Byun Jin-sub | K-pop |
| — | Slow Days | Lee Tzsche | Pop, Ballad |

=== November ===
| Date | Title | Artist | Genre(s) |
|---|---|---|---|
| 30 | Invisible Love | Shin Seung-hun | K-pop, Ballad |

=== December ===
| Date | Title | Artist | Genre(s) |

=== N/A ===
| Date | Title | Artist | Genre(s) |
|---|---|---|---|
| — | From Now On | Jeon In-kwon | Rock |
