= Will (band) =

Canadian band

- Origin: Vancouver, British Columbia, Canada
- Genres: Electronic, ambient, neo-medieval
- Years active: 1991–1992
- Labels: Third Mind, COP International
- Past members: Rhys Fulber; Chris Peterson; John McRae; Jeff Stoddard

Will was a Canadian electronic music act founded by Rhys Fulber and Chris Peterson, both members of Front Line Assembly and Delerium at different times. The style was heavy medieval ambient industrial with sampled strings and featured growled vocals by John McRae, who later continued to work with Chris Peterson in the project Decree.

== Discography ==
- Pearl of Great Price (1991, Third Mind)
- Word•Flesh•Stone (1992, Third Mind)
- Déjà-Vu (2000, COP International) – re-release of the first two releases with some changes to tracks
