= Poupée psychédélique =

1991 single by Thierry Hazard

Single by Thierry Hazard

from the album Pop Music
- B-side: "Back in the Sixties"
- Released: 1990
- Recorded: 1988
- Studio: Studio Marcadet
- Genre: Pop
- Length: 3:21
- Label: CBS
- Songwriter(s): Thierry Hazard
- Producer(s): Thierry Hazard

Thierry Hazard singles chronology
"Le Jerk !" (1990)	"Poupée psychédélique" (1990)	"Les Brouillards de Londres" (1991)

"Poupée psychédélique" (transl. French for "Psychedelic Doll") is a 1990 pop song recorded by French singer Thierry Hazard. Written and composed by Hazard, it was released in December 1990 as the second single from his debut album Pop Music, after being unsuccessfully released a first time two years earlier. It became one of the major hits of 1991 in France, reaching nearly the same level of success as "Le Jerk !", the previous single. Part of the music video consists of an old-fashioned animated cartoon recalling the 60s.

== Chart performance ==
In France, "Poupée psychédélique" debuted at number 47 on the chart edition of 5 January 1991, climbed regularly and entered the top ten in its seven-week. It reached its highest position, number two, in its 14th week, being however unable to dethrone Scorpions's massive hit "Wind of Change"; then it remained for 14 weeks in the top ten and 23 weeks in the top 50. In 1991, it earned a Gold disc, awarded by the Syndicat National de l'Édition Phonographique, the French certificator. On the European Hot 100 Singles, "Poupée psychédélique" debuted at number 72 on 23 February 1991, reached a peak of number 18 in the eighth week, and fell off the top 100 after 17 weeks of presence. It ranked at number 77 on the year-end chart.

== Track listings ==
- CD single
1. "Poupée psychédélique" – 3:21
2. "Back in the Sixties" – 3:30
- 12" maxi
1. "Poupée psychédélique" (dance mix) – 6:42
2. "Poupée psychédélique" (version 45t) – 3:22
3. "Poupée psychédélique" (70 pop mix) – 4:58
- 7" single
1. "Poupée psychédélique" – 3:21
2. "Back in the Sixties" – 3:30
- 7" single – Promo
1. "Poupée psychédélique" – 3:21

== Personnel ==
- Design – Christine Le Meur
- Photography – Youri Lenquette
- Recording and mixing – Christophe Dubois

== Charts and certifications ==
=== Weekly charts ===
Chart (1991)	Peak position
Europe (European Hot 100)	18
France (SNEP)	2

=== Year-end charts ===
Chart (1991)	Position
Europe (Eurochart Hot 100)	77

=== Certifications ===
Certifications for "Poupée psychédélique"
Region	Certification	Certified units/sales
France (SNEP)	Gold	250,000^{*}
^{*} Sales figures based on certification alone.

== Release history ==
Country	Date	Format	Label
France	1990	CD single	CBS
France	1990	7" single	CBS
France	1990	12" maxi	CBS
