= Jil Caplan =

French singer and songwriter

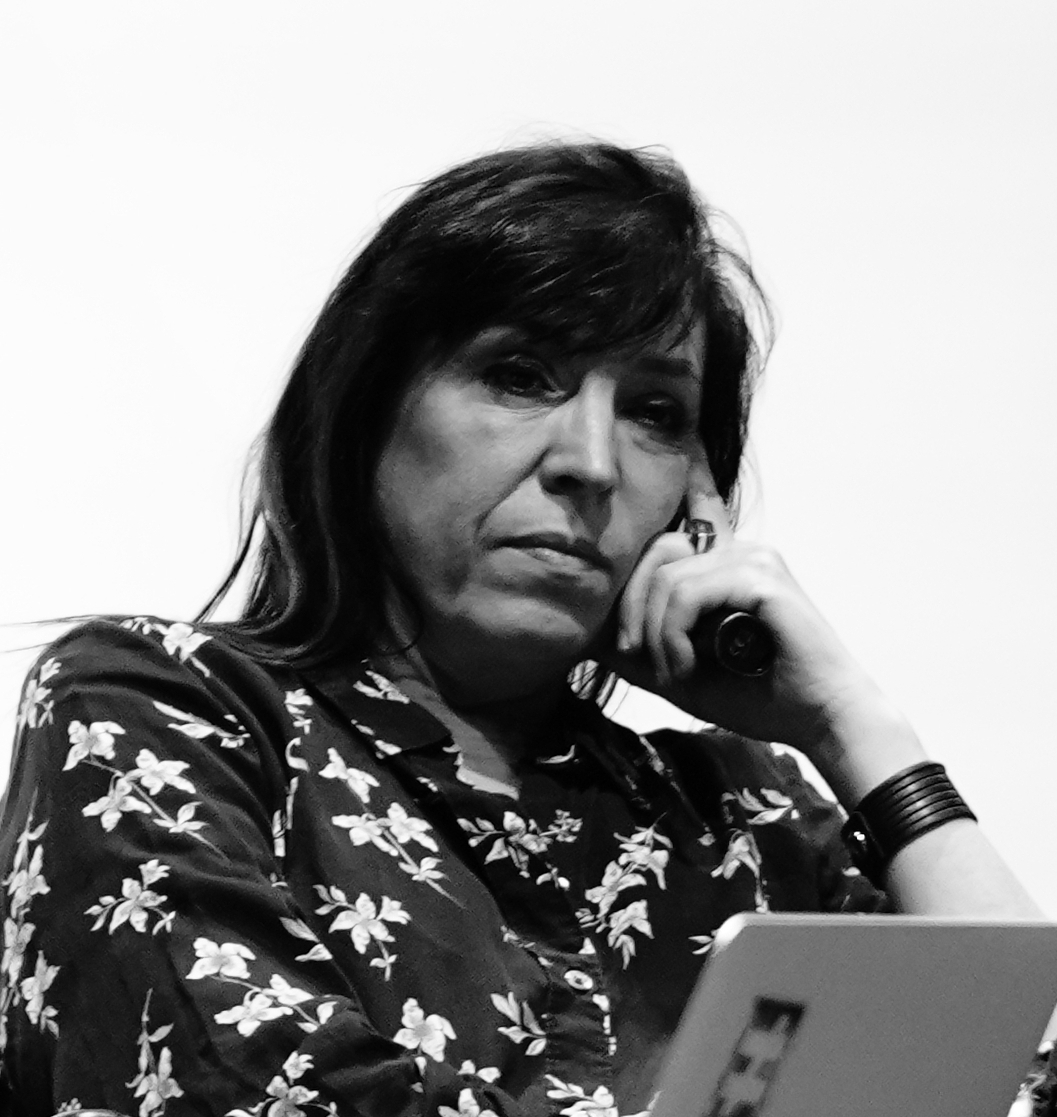

Background information
- Born: Valentine Guilen; 23 October 1965 (age 60)
- Origin: France
- Genres: Pop music
- Occupations: Singer, songwriter
- Years active: 1987–present
- Label: EnT-T

Jil Caplan (born Valentine Guilen; 23 October 1965 in Paris, France) is a French singer and songwriter.

== Biography ==
Paris-born Valentine Guilen studied modern literature at the Sorbonne and theatre at the Cours Florent, where she met Jay Alanski, producer and composer of the most influential pop songs of the 1980s. In August 1986, she met her friends Les Innocents, then unknown by the general public, in a recording studio, where the group recorded their first single "Jodie", under the leadership of Alanski, who quickly offered her the chance to sing.

=== Success and consecration ===
Valentine Guilen, who adopted the pseudonym "Jil Caplan", accepted and released in 1987 her first album, À peine 21. Its single "Oh! Tous les soirs" was a success, entering the French Top 40. Other singles from this album, like "Comme sur une balançoire", "Cette fille n'est pas pour toi", etc. received public attention and radio airplay in 1988/89.
Jil and Jay would go on to make three albums together; directing most of the videoclips, as well as designing the CD covers.

In 1990 was released the Caplan's second album (la Charmeuse de serpents), from which three singles entered the French Top 40 in 1991/92, notably "Natalie Wood" which reached n°13 and "Tout c'qui nous sépare", a Top 10 hit (n°6). The album itself was a major success, earning a double Gold certification, just missing the French Top 10 (n°11).

In 1992, Jil won a Victoire de la Musique for Female revelation of the year. Then Alanski decided to turn to electronic music.

=== New directions ===
Caplan wrote her own songs then, and chose Jean-Philippe Nataf (ex-member of Les Innocents), to produce her album Toute crue (2001, Warner). Alongside her musical activities, Caplan, always fascinated by the filmmaking, produced and directed a 45-minute film for the group Lilicub. She wrote articles for the independent magazine Brazil.

In 2004, she released "Comme elle vient", a single made with another ex-member of Les Innocents, Jean-Christophe Urbain. Together they went on an acoustic tour of Burma. In 2006, she directed the making-of the recording of French singer Patxi Garat's debut album (S'embrasser), directed by Urbain. In 2007, after a decade's absence, Caplan joined up with Alanski again. She wrote most of the lyrics, while he composed all the music of her seventh album, entitled Derrière la porte. The first single was "Des toutes petites choses".

In 2013, Caplan collaborated with producer Dub Mentor on the single "Want You More", a rendition of a Robert Palmer song. A year later they collaborated again on a version of "The Crying Game". Both singles were part of Dub Mentor's Versions project (released on the alternative/minimalist label EnT-T) and she directed both video clips for the songs.

== Discography ==
=== Singles ===
- "Oh! Tous les soirs" (1987) – No. 36
- "Comme sur une balançoire" (1987)
- "Cette Fille n'est pas pour toi" (1988)
- "Tard dans la nuit" (1989)
- "Tout c'qui nous sépare" (1991) – No. 6
- "Natalie Wood" (1991) – #13
- "As-tu déjà oublié?" (1992) – #40
- "Parle-moi (entre les tombes)" (1992)
- "La Frontière" (1993)
- "La Grande Malle" (1994)
- "Les Deux Bras arrachés" (1994)
- "L'Âge de raison" (1996)
- "La Passerelle" (1997)
- "Tu Verras" (1998)
- "Le Lac" (2001)
- "Toute la journée je reste au lit" (2001)
- "La Maison abandonnée" (2002)
- "Toi et Moi" (2004)
- "Assise au-dessus de l'Europe" (2005)
- "Des toutes petites choses" (2007)
- "Want You More" (EnT-T, 2012)
- "The Crying Game" (EnT-T, 2013)

=== Albums ===
- À peine 21 (1987)
- La Charmeuse de serpents (1990) – #11 in France
- Avant qu'il ne soit trop tard (1993) – No. 38 in France
- Jil Caplan (1996)
- Jours de fête (compilation, 1998)
- Toute crue (2001) – No. 113 in France
- Comme elle vient (2004) – No. 90 in France, No. 68 in Belgium
- Derrière la porte (2007) – No. 119 in France

=== EP ===
- Gueule d'amour (Jil Caplan and Doc Pilot, 2002)

=== Other ===
- "Les Mots" on the album Urgence – 27 artistes pour la recherche contre le sida (1992)
- "Les Eaux de mars" (with Christophe J) on the album A tribute to Carlos Jobim (1997)
- "Un Autre Monde", theme from the soundtrack of the film La Petite Sirène, by Walt Disney (1998)
- "Un Train ce soir" (avec Rob) on the album Tribute to Polnareff (1999)
