= Le Dormeur =

1991 single by Pleasure Game

Single by Pleasure Game

from the album Le Dormeur
- B-side: "Remix"
- Released: 1991
- Recorded: 1991
- Genre: Electronic, techno, hardcore
- Length: 3:44 (album version)
- Label: Music Man, Touch of Gold
- Songwriter(s): Bruno Van Garsse, Benoît Marissal, Jacky Meurisse, Michel de San Antonio
- Producer(s): Bruno Van Garsse

Pleasure Game singles chronology
"Le Dormeur" (1991)	"Le Seigneur des ténèbres" (1991)

"Le Dormeur" (transl. French for "The Sleeper") is a 1991 electronic song recorded by Belgian act Pleasure Game. Written and composed by Bruno Van Garsse, Benoît Marissal, Jacky Meurisse and Michel de San Antonio, it was released in the summer of 1991 as the band's debut single from the album Le Dormeur on which it was the second track. It became a hit in France and the Francophone part of Belgium where it became a top ten hit.

== Lyrics and music ==
The sentence repeated throughout the song "le dormeur doit se réveiller" is a sample from David Lynch's 1984 American epic science fiction film Dune. According to Elia Habib, an expert of French charts, "Le Dormeur" displays a "soaring atmosphere to the sound of saturated synthesizers and a cavernous voice cousin to that of Darth Vader", which allowed the song to have a great success in discothèques. Music & Media presented the song as beginning "with the sound of morning church bells, a dark voice announcing the awakening of the sleeper, followed by heavy bleeping dance sounds".

== Chart performance ==
In France, "Le Dormeur" debuted at number 47 on the chart edition of 6 July 1991, climbed regularly and entered the top ten in its 12th week; it reached its highest position, number nine, the next week, then began to drop and remained for 19 weeks in the top 50. As of February 1992, 138,000 units of the song were sold in France. In Belgium (Wallonia), it charted for 15 weeks in the top ten, with a peak at number five on 7 September 1991. On the European Hot 100 Singles chart, it debuted at number 100 on 20 July 1991, reached a peak of number 36 in the 13rd week, and fell off the top 100 after 18 weeks of presence.

== Track listings ==
=== France ===
==== 1991 release ====
- CD maxi - France
1. "Le Dormeur" (extended amnesia mix) — 4:55
2. "Le Dormeur" (SA 42 mix) — 3:34
3. "Le Dormeur" (P. Traikos Cheops mix) — 4:02
4. "Across the Dark" — 4:43
- 12" maxi - France
1. "Le Dormeur" (extended amnesia mix) — 4:55
2. "Le Dormeur" (SA 42 mix) — 3:34
3. "Le Dormeur" (P. Traikos Cheops mix) — 4:02
- 12" maxi - Remixes - France
1. "Le Dormeur" (the end of the story mix) — 4:57
2. "Le Dormeur" (extended amnesia mix) — 4:55
3. "Le Dormeur" (SA 42 mix) — 3:34
- 12" maxi - Remixes - Promo - France
1. "Le Dormeur" (the end of the story mix) — 4:57
2. "Le Dormeur" (la Walkyrie rave mix) — 5:01
- 7" single - France
1. "Le Dormeur" (amnesia mix) — 3:43
2. "Le Dormeur" (P. Traikos Cheops mix) — 4:02
- Cassette - France
1. "Le Dormeur" (amnesia mix) — 3:43
2. "Le Dormeur" (P. Traikos Cheops mix) — 4:02

==== 2002 remixes ====
- CD maxi - 2002 remixes - France
1. "Le Dormeur" (single edit sarcophage mix) — 3:09
2. "Le Dormeur" (F. De Backer & DJ HS mix single edit) — 3:25
3. "Le Dormeur" (sarcophage version extended mix) — 5:47
4. "Le Dormeur" (F. De Backer & DJ HS extended mix) — 7:32
- 12" maxi - 2002 remixes - France
1. "Le Dormeur doit se réveiller" (sarcophage mix) — 5:47
2. "Le Dormeur doit se réveiller" (remix) — 7:27

=== Belgium ===
- CD single - Belgium
1. "Le Dormeur" (the end of the story mix) — 4:57
2. "Le Dormeur" (la Walkyrie rave mix) — 5:01
- CD maxi - Belgium
1. "Le Dormeur" (paradox mix) — 6:30
2. "Le Dormeur" (amnesia remix) — 5:37
3. "Le Dormeur" (SA 42 mix) — 5:00
4. "Across the Dark" (signal mix) — 4:45
- 12" maxi - Belgium
1. "Le Dormeur" (paradox mix) — 6:30
2. "Across the Dark" (signal mix) — 4:43
- 12" maxi - Remixes - Belgium
1. "Le Dormeur" (amnesia mix) — 5:38
2. "Le Dormeur" (SA 42 remix) — 4:58
- 7" single - Belgium
1. "Le Dormeur" (SA 42 remix) — 3:44
2. "Le Dormeur" (amnesia mix) — 4:02

=== Spain and Mexico ===
- 12" maxi - Spain
1. "Le Dormeur" (la Walkyrie rave mix) — 5:01
2. "Le Dormeur" (the end of the story mix) — 4:57
3. "Le Dormeur" (P. Traikos Cheops mix) — 4:02
4. "Le Dormeur" (extended amnesia mix) — 4:55
5. "Le Dormeur" (SA 42 mix) — 3:34
6. "Across the Dark" — 4:44
- 7" single - Promo - Spain
1. "Le Dormeur" (la Walkyrie rave mix single) — 3:40
2. "Le Dormeur" (amnesia mix) — 3:43
- 12" maxi - Mexico
1. "Durmiente (Le Dormeur)" (amnesia mix) — 5:38
2. "Durmiente (Le Dormeur)" (SA 42) — 4:58
- 7" single - Promo - Mexico
1. "Durmiente (Le Dormeur)" (amnesia mix) — 3:00
2. "Durmiente (Le Dormeur)" (SA 42 remix) — 3:00

== Charts ==
Chart (1991)	Peak position
Belgium (Ultratop 50 Flanders)	23
Belgium (Ultratop 50 Wallonia)	5
Europe (European Hot 100)	36
France (SNEP)	9

== Release history ==
Country	Date	Format	Label
France	1991	CD single	Touch of Gold
France	1991	7" single	Touch of Gold
France	1991	12" maxi	Touch of Gold
France	1991	Cassette	Touch of Gold
Belgium	1991	CD single	Music Man
Belgium	1991	CD maxi	Music Man
Belgium	1991	7" single	Music Man
Belgium	1991	12" maxi	Music Man
Spain	1991	12" maxi	Max Music
Spain	1991	Promotional 7" single	Max Music
Mexico	1991	12" maxi	Musart
Mexico	1991	Promotional 7" single	Musart
France	2002	CD maxi - Remixes	Scorpio Music
France	2002	12" maxi - Remixes	Scorpio Music
