= Ellen James Society =

US rock band

Ellen James Society was an indie rock band, based in Atlanta, that was fronted by Cooper Seay and Chris McGuire. Gary Held, Jan Dykes, Scott Bland, Fletcher Liegerot, and Bryan Lilje were also members at various times. They formed in 1987 and disbanded in the early 1990s after releasing two albums on Daemon Records.

The band took their name from that of a fictitious group of women that appear in the 1978 novel The World According to Garp by the American novelist John Irving (adapted as a film in 1982). In the novel, the group was composed of women who had cut off their tongues in protest at the rape of an (also fictitious) eleven-year-old girl, Ellen James, whose tongue was cut off by her attackers in order to prevent her from identifying them.

== Discography ==
- Reluctantly We
- The Survivors Parade
