= Thierry Hazard =

- Birth name: Thierry Gesteau
- Born: 7 June 1962 (age 62)
- Genres: Pop music
- Occupation(s): Singer, songwriter
- Years active: 1983–1994

Thierry "Hazard" Gesteau (French pronunciation: [tiʁi ʒɛsto], [azaʁ]; born 7 June 1962) is a French singer-songwriter.

== Biography ==
Gesteau was born in Compiègne, and grew up in Sèvres. During the 1980s, he became the singer of the band GPS, an acronym of Garage Psychiatric Suburban (the group's guitarist, Tom "Backerfix" Darnal, became Mano Negra's keyboardist). Hazard released his first solo single "Poupée psychédélique" in 1988 but it passed unnoticed. Two years after, he released "Le Jerk !" which became a huge hit in summer 1990 (#2 in France). His first solo album Pop music was released in 1990 and had a great success thanks to the two titles mentioned above ("Poupée psychédélique" was re-released at the end of 1990, reaching #2 in France), but also with other songs which were much aired on radio such as "Les Brouillards de Londres", "Un Jour c'est oui, un Jour c'est non" and "Les Temps sont durs". A cover of Michel Polnareff's song, "Tout, Tout, pour ma chérie", is also included on this album. In 1994, Hazard launched his second album entitled Où sont passés les Beatniks? with the singles "Julie est trop prude" and "Où sont passés les Beatniks?" but they didn't meet with success.

== Discography ==
=== Songs not released as singles ===
- "Jusqu'à la fin de l'été"
- "Le Jeu de l'amour et du hasard"
- "Goodbye Mary"
- "Sing Sing"
- "Rendez-vous à Katmandou"
- "Tout, Tout pour ma chérie"
- "Juste quelques mots"
- "Back in the Sixties"
- "Panique sur la plage"
- "Les Années pop"
- "21 Rue St-Martin"
- "Le Nirvana"
- "Le Vagabond"
- "Youri Gagarine"
- "L'Amour n'a pas voulu de moi"
- "Mon Ange gardien"

=== Singles ===
- "Poupée psychédélique" (1988)
- "Le Jerk" (1989) #2 in France
- "Poupée psychédélique" (1990) #2 in France
- "Les Brouillards de Londres" (1991) #5 in France
- "Un Jour c'est oui, un Jour c'est non" (1991) # 13 in France
- "Les Temps sont durs" (1991)
- "Julie est trop prude" (1994)
- "Où sont passés les beatniks ?" (1994)

== Albums ==
Studio albums

- Pop Music (1990)
- Où sont passés les beatniks ? (1994)

Compilation

- Le Jerk (2000)
