= Pearl of Great Price (album) =

Studio album by Will
- Released: December 1991
- Recorded: 1987 – 1990
- Genre: Dark wave, martial industrial
- Length: 53:31
- Label: Third Mind
- Producer: Michael Balch, Rhys Fulber, Chris Peterson

Will chronology
Pearl of Great Price (1991)	Word•Flesh•Stone (1992)

Professional ratings
Review scores
Source	Rating
Music From the Empty Quarter	Favorable

Pearl of Great Price is the debut studio album of Will, released in December 1991 by Third Mind Records. It was composed from three years worth of recorded music leading up to its release.

== Track listing ==
All lyrics are written by John McRae; all music is composed by Rhys Fulber, John McRae, Chris Peterson and Jeff Stoddard

No.	Title	Length
1.	"Summoning"	3:12
2.	"Crowning Glory"	5:23
3.	"Exhaust Inhibits"	3:43
4.	"Sacrement of Penance"	5:17
5.	"Crusade"	4:10
6.	"Visible Second Coming"	5:07
7.	"Furnace of Souls"	4:06
8.	"Father Forgive"	5:08
9.	"Crimson Flow"	4:44
10.	"Epilogue"	3:32
11.	"New Mass"	4:55
12.	"Measures Remedial"	4:14

== Personnel ==
Adapted from the Pearl of Great Price liner notes.

Will

- Rhys Fulber – keyboards, drum programming, production, engineering
- John McRae – vocals, art direction
- Chris Peterson – keyboards, production, engineering
- Jeff Stoddard – electric guitar

Production and additional personnel

- Kelly Alm – design
- Michael Balch – production, engineering
- John Dennison – photography

== Release history ==
Region	Date	Label	Format	Catalog
United States	1991	Third Mind	CD, CS	TM 9269
