= Holy Smokes =

Holy Smokes may refer to:

- "Holy Smokes" (Trippie Redd song), 2021
- "Holy Smokes" (Bailey Zimmerman song), 2024
- Holy Smokes (album), 1997 album by Suzzy Roche

== See also ==
- Holy Smoke
