= The Roches =

American vocal trio

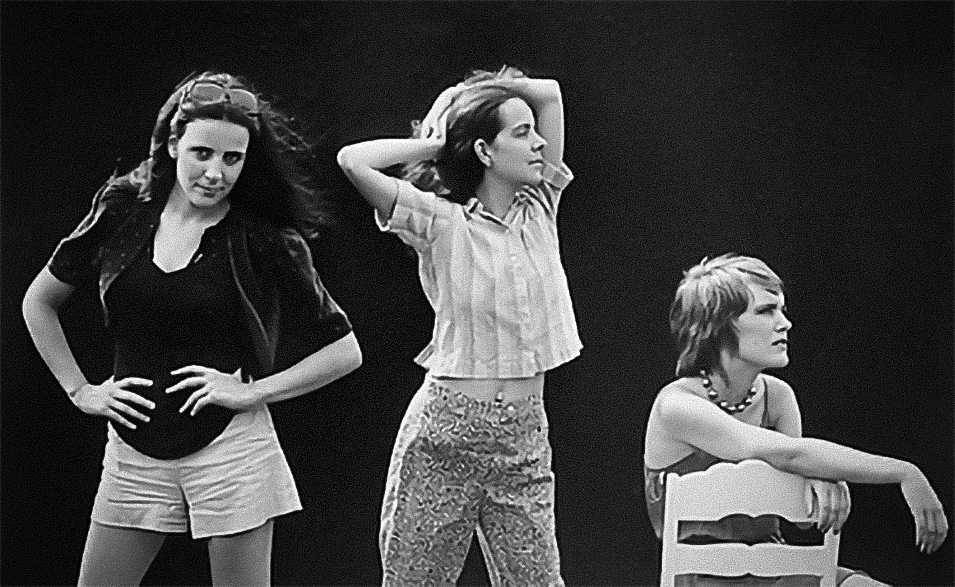
- The Roches in 1980. Left to right: Suzzy, Maggie, Terre

Background information
- Origin: Park Ridge, New Jersey, U.S.
- Genres: Folk; folk pop; pop rock
- Years active: 1973–2017
- Labels: Warner Bros.; Real Live; Paradox; MCA; Rhino; Baby Music Boom; Rykodisc; 429
- Past members: Maggie Roche; Terre Roche; Suzzy Roche
- Website: roches.com

The Roches were an American vocal trio of sisters Maggie, Terre and Suzzy Roche, from Park Ridge, New Jersey. Maggie and Terre first performed as a duo in the late 1960s, sang backup on Paul Simon's 1973 album There Goes Rhymin' Simon, and released one album as a duo, Seductive Reasoning (1975). Suzzy joined later in the 1970s to form the trio. The sisters worked as bartenders at Gerde's Folk City in Greenwich Village, where they also began performing.

Their first album as a trio, The Roches (1979), was produced by Robert Fripp. Maggie's song "The Married Men" from the album was later recorded by Phoebe Snow. The group performed on Saturday Night Live in 1979 and released several more albums in the 1980s and 1990s, including the Christmas album We Three Kings (1990) and the children's album Will You Be My Friend? (1994). They also appeared on Rock Goes to College, Soundstage and The Tonight Show Starring Johnny Carson, and provided songs for the films Crossing Delancey (1988) and The Land Before Time II: The Great Valley Adventure (1994).

In 1997, the sisters put the group on hold to work on solo projects. They reunited for a holiday tour in 2005 and released Moonswept in 2007, their first studio album in 12 years. Maggie Roche died in 2017. Suzzy's daughter, Lucy Wainwright Roche, is also a singer.

== Career ==
In the late 1960s, eldest sister Maggie (October 26, 1951 – January 21, 2017) and middle sister Terre (pronounced "Terry", born April 10, 1953) attended Park Ridge High School, but dropped out of school to tour as a duo. Maggie wrote most of the songs, with Terre contributing to a few. The sisters got a break when Paul Simon brought them in as backup singers on his 1973 album There Goes Rhymin' Simon. They got his assistance (along with an appearance by the Oak Ridge Boys) on their only album as a duo, Seductive Reasoning (1975).

Reviewing Seductive Reasoning in Christgau's Record Guide: Rock Albums of the Seventies (1981), Robert Christgau said, "Female singing duos must function as mutual support groups; last time a women's sensibility this assured, relaxed, and reflective made it to vinyl was Joy of Cooking. These folkies manque are a little flat here, a little arch there, but in general the shoe fits; no ideological feminism, but plenty of consciousness."

Later in the 1970s youngest sister Suzzy (rhymes with "fuzzy", born September 29, 1956) joined the group to form the Roches trio.

Around this time, they parlayed bartending jobs at the Greenwich Village folk venue Gerde's Folk City into stage appearances, an experience they commemorated in their song "Face Down at Folk City" (from Another World, 1985). There they met many of their future singing and songwriting collaborators. Terre was now writing songs as well, and by the time of their first album as a trio, The Roches (1979), Suzzy had also begun writing. Robert Fripp produced the album. Maggie's "The Married Men" from this album was eventually to become the songwriting trio's biggest hit—not for them, but for Phoebe Snow. After Snow and Linda Ronstadt performed the song in a duet on Saturday Night Live, the Roches were invited to perform on the show a few months later in 1979 at Simon's behest. They did two songs, both unreleased at the time: "Bobby's Song" and "The Hallelujah Chorus".

Throughout the 1980s, the Roches continued to release their music to small audiences, little or no air play, and only modest record sales. In February 1981 the BBC broadcast a 40-minute performance in its series Rock Goes to College. A 1983 episode of the PBS concert series Soundstage was devoted to an hourlong performance by the trio, and they appeared on The Tonight Show Starring Johnny Carson in November 1985, performing their song "Mr. Sellack". In 1990, they returned to their Christmas-caroling roots with the release of the 24-track We Three Kings, which included the a cappella "Star of Wonder", written by Terre. After another pop album (A Dove, 1992), they recorded an entire album of children's songs, Will You Be My Friend?, featuring a song by brother David and various young backup singers, including Suzzy's daughter Lucy Wainwright Roche.

After a tour interrupted by the death of their father, the Roches released Can We Go Home Now (1995), the last original recording they released as a trio until 2007.

In 1997, the sisters formally put their group on long-term hold. They continued to work on solo projects and often collaborated on albums and performances. Terre teaches guitar workshops and has released a solo album. Suzzy, who has acted on the stage and in several movies, released two of her own albums and two with Maggie, with whom she toured. All three sisters periodically participated in New York-area events. At the end of 2005, the three Roches (with brother Dave) reunited for a short but successful holiday tour. Several more appearances in the U.S. and Canada took place in 2006–07, and in March 2007, after a 12-year hiatus, the Roches released a new studio album, Moonswept. After the tour for Moonswept, the Roches announced that they would no longer be touring, but they continued to make isolated appearances individually and as a group, mostly in and around New York City.

On January 21, 2017, Maggie Roche died from breast cancer at the age of 65. In a statement on Facebook, Suzzy wrote that Maggie "was a private person, too sensitive and shy for this world, but brimming with life, love, and talent. She was smart, wickedly funny, and authentic — not a false bone in her body — a brilliant songwriter, with a distinct unique perspective, all heart and soul." She was survived by her partner Michael McCarthy and son Edward "Felix" McTeigue.

== Family ==
Maggie Roche had an "unusual" contralto voice—"almost a baritone". Terre provided a soprano that bracketed the upper range of the sisters, while Suzzy filled in the middle range. While touring, the sisters accompanied themselves with guitars and keyboards, occasionally with additional musicians.

Terre Roche continues to perform publicly in New York City, and since 2002 she has led a "Sunset Singing Circle" at Battery Park in Manhattan under the auspices of the Parks Department.

Brother David is also a singer-songwriter with his own solo album, and often backed up the trio on their recordings. Maggie's son, Felix McTeigue, recorded three albums (one with his group Filo) and was a producer for others. Suzzy's daughter, Lucy Wainwright Roche, has also contributed vocals on the Roches' and McTeigue's albums, and in 2007 produced an EP of her own, 8 Songs, followed by 8 More in 2008 and tours opening for acts such as Amos Lee and the Indigo Girls. Lucy has released three albums: Lucy (2010), There's a Last Time for Everything (2013), and Little Beast (2018). Her father is Loudon Wainwright III, and she is the half-sister of singers Martha and Rufus Wainwright.

== Discography ==
=== Maggie and Terre Roche ===
- Seductive Reasoning (Columbia, 1975)
- I Gave My Love a Kerry (Earth Rock Wreckerds, 2004)

=== The Roches ===
- The Roches (Warner, 1979)
- Nurds (Warner Bros., 1980)
- Keep On Doing (Warner Bros., 1982)
- Another World (Warner Bros., 1985)
- No Trespassing (Real Live Records, 1986)
- Speak (MCA, 1989)
- We Three Kings (MCA, 1990)
- A Dove (MCA, 1992)
- Will You Be My Friend? (Baby Boom, 1994)
- Can We Go Home Now (Rykodisc, 1995).
- The Collected Works of the Roches (Warner Bros./Rhino/Atlantic, 2003)
- Moonswept (429 Records, 2007)
- Rhino HiFive: The Roches (Warner Bros./Rhino/Atlantic, 2007)

=== Suzzy Roche ===
- Holy Smokes (Red House, 1997)
- Songs from an Unmarried Housewife and Mother, Greenwich Village, USA (Red House, 2000)

=== Terre Roche ===
- The Sound of a Tree Falling (Earth Rock Wreckerds, 1998)
- Imprint (Earth Rock Wreckerds, 2015)
- Inner Adult (Terre Roche, 2024)

=== Suzzy and Maggie Roche ===
- Zero Church (Red House, 2002)
- Why The Long Face (Red House, 2004)

=== Suzzy Roche and Lucy Wainwright Roche ===
- Fairytale and Myth (2013)
- Mud and Apples (2016)
- I Can Still Hear You (2020)

=== Terre Roche, Sidiki Conde and Marlon Cherry (as Afro-Jersey) ===
- Afro-Jersey (2013)

== Other appearances ==
- There Goes Rhymin' Simon (1973). Maggie and Terre are credited on "Was a Sunny Day" on Simon's second solo album.
- Saturday Night Live (1979). The Roches were the musical guest on November 17, 1979, singing "Bobby's Song" and their a cappella "Hallelujah Chorus".
- Exposure (1979), a Robert Fripp album featuring vocals by Terre
- Soundstage (1983). The Roches were the featured group in one episode of this televised music series.
- The Tonight Show Starring Johnny Carson (November 20, 1985). The Roches performed "Mr. Sellack" and "Another World".
- Songs from Liquid Days (1986). The Roches are featured in two songs in this collection of music by Philip Glass, the title track and "Forgetting" (with Linda Ronstadt).
- Crossing Delancey (1988), starring Amy Irving. Suzzy played Marilyn, a friend of Isabelle (Irving). The Roches provided several songs for the soundtrack. One of the songs that was featured in the film, Nocturne, is also featured on the group's 1989 album Speak. An earlier arrangement of their cover of Come Softly to Me is featured on their album Another World.
- Stay Awake (1988). The Roches contributed to two tracks on this tribute album of music from vintage Disney films.
- Tiny Toon Adventures, episode "New Character Day" (February 20, 1991). The Roches played a trio of singing cockroaches also called "the Roches."
- Princesses (1991). The trio performs the short-lived TV series' theme song "Someday My Prince Will Come".
- A Weekend in the Country (1994). The trio play themselves, performing "Pregnant Pause" at a concert.
- The Land Before Time II: The Great Valley Adventure (December 1994). The band wrote the songs "Peaceful Valley", "Eggs" and "You're One of Us Now".
- A Family Concert (K-tel VHS, 1995). Includes performances by the Roches and the Music Workshop for Kids
- Anthem (Intersound, 1996), by the Desolation Angels, a supergroup consisting of the Roches, Karla DeVito, Kit Hain, Deborah Berg, the Blister Sisters, and Jane Kelly Williams.
- Christmas Songs (One Voice/Satellites Records, 1996), by the Carolling Carollers, another supergroup consisting of the Roches, Ilana Iguana, Margaret Dorn, Libby Mclaren, and Bonnie Mann
- Tracey Takes On..., episode "Music" (April 30, 1997)
- Time and Love: The Music of Laura Nyro (Astor Place Records, 1997) – "Wedding Bell Blues"
- Time and Love: The Music of Laura Nyro (Astor Place Records, 1997) – "Wedding Bell Blues"
- What's That I Hear?: The Songs of Phil Ochs (Sliced Bread Records, 1998) – "The Bells" (Poem by Edgar Allan Poe adapted & set to music by Phil Ochs)
- Live at the World Café: Volume 9 (1999) – "Hammond Song"
- Moms That Cook (Baby Boom, 1999), by the Music Workshop for Kids. Suzzy produced as well as performed on this album by various artists
- Rites of Passage, fourth album by the Atlanta, Georgia duo Indigo Girls. Maggie, Terre, and Suzzy sing backing vocals on "Virginia Woolf" and "Airplane".
- Nod to Bob: An Artist's Tribute to Bob Dylan on His 60th Birthday (Red House, 2001). Suzzy and Maggie perform "Clothes Line Saga" from The Basement Tapes.
- Some Assembly Required (Shanachie, 2002), by the Four Bitchin' Babes. Suzzy was one of the latter-day Babes in this rotating-membership pop-folk group founded by Christine Lavin.
- Endless Highway: The Music of The Band (429 Records/SLG Music/EMI, 2007). The Roches perform the Band classic "Acadian Driftwood".
- Please Give (2010). The Roches sing "No Shoes" by Paranoid Larry.
- Amen & Goodbye (2016). Suzzy appears on the songs "I Am Chemistry," "Half Asleep," and "Gerson's Whistle" on the fourth album by the Brooklyn indie trio Yeasayer.

== See also ==
- List of sibling groups
