= Zero Church =

Studio album by Suzzy and Maggie Roche
- Released: January 22, 2002
- Genre: Folk, gospel
- Length: 49:48
- Label: Red House

Professional ratings
Review scores
Source	Rating
AllMusic	4/5 stars
Billboard	(positive)
Robert Christgau	(choice cut)
The Christian Science Monitor	(positive)
PopMatters	(positive)

Zero Church is a 2002 album by sisters Suzzy and Maggie Roche, formerly of the Roches. It was originally scheduled for release on September 11, 2001, but this was delayed about 4 months. It consists of songs made out of prayers the Roche sisters heard while taking part in a Harvard University arts collaborative.

== Track listing ==
1. "Couldn't Hear Nobody Pray" – 2:01
2. "Jeremiah" – 3:31
3. "Anyway" – 2:48
4. "Each of Us Has a Name" – 2:30
5. "Why Am I Praying" – 2:57
6. "Teach Me O Lord" – 3:37
7. "Hallelujah" – 4:02
8. "A Prayer" – 4:20
9. "Praise Song for a New Day" – 1:56
10. "Sounds" – 3:32
11. "Allende" – 3:47
12. "This Gospel How Precious" – 0:56
13. "New York City" – 3:22
14. "Aveenu Malcainu" – 1:55
15. "Together With You" – 2:25
16. "God Bless the Artists" – 2:34
17. "Prayer by Francis Bok" – 0:53
18. "Musical Prayer by Francis Bok" – 3:10
