= Speak (The Roches album) =

Studio album by the Roches
- Released: October 31, 1989
- Genre: Pop folk
- Length: 50:17
- Label: MCA
- Producers: The Roches, Jeffrey Lesser

The Roches chronology
Crossing Delancey (1988)	Speak (1989)	We Three Kings (1990)

Speak is an album by the American musical trio the Roches, released in 1989 on MCA Records. The album contained two singles that had accompanying videos, "Big Nuthin'" and "Everyone Is Good". Another track, "Nocturne", was included in the 1988 film Crossing Delancey, which costarred Suzzy Roche.

"Big Nuthin'" was a minor radio hit. The trio supported the album with a North American tour.

== Production ==
The album was coproduced by the Roches; many songs were first takes. The Roches had been singing many of the songs for years, and decided to flesh them out with drum machines and synthesizers. The sisters shared in the songwriting. "Big Nuthin'" references their appearance on Saturday Night Live. The lyrics to "Cloud Dancing" were inspired by a 16th-century Chinese poet.

== Critical reception ==
Professional ratings
Review scores
Source	Rating
AllMusic	4/5 stars
Calgary Herald	B+
Chicago Tribune	3.5/4 stars
Robert Christgau	A−
The Encyclopedia of Popular Music	3/5 stars
Ottawa Citizen	4/5 stars
The Rolling Stone Album Guide	3.5/5 stars
Spin Alternative Record Guide	8/10

The New York Times wrote: "Throughout most of the album, there is a feeling that not a note or a word has been wasted, as the trio strives toward a sparseness and clarity that underscores its exquisite vocal blend." The Chicago Tribune concluded that "the Roches' intricate, artfully balanced harmonies again take center stage and are matched by finely honed, complex tales that provoke almost simultaneous laughter and tears." The Globe and Mail deemed the album "yet another collection of too-cute pop folk ditties." The Ottawa Citizen determined that "the music stretches across a confessional of private thoughts to a streak of outrageous sarcasm."

The Rolling Stone Album Guide noted the "electro-organic landscape." The Spin Alternative Record Guide praised the "Casio-based sound the takes home cooking into outer space."

== Track listing ==
1. "Speak" – 4:18
2. "Big Nuthin'" – 4:41
3. "Cloud Dancing" – 2:51
4. "Everyone Is Good" – 3:54
5. "In the World" – 2:36
6. "I Love My Mom" – 4:04
7. "Losing Our Job" – 4:24
8. "Person with a Past" – 5:04
9. "The Anti-Sex Backlash of the 80's" – 2:36
10. "Easy" – 3:34
11. "Nocturne" – 4:46
12. "Merciful God" – 4:11
13. "Broken Places" – 4:46
14. "The Feeling Is Mutual" – 2:41

== Personnel ==
- Produced by the Roches and Jeffrey Lesser
- Engineered by Jeffrey Lesser
- Executive Producer: Teddy Wainwright
- A&R: Marty Scott
- Jeff Lippay: Assistant Engineer / Glen Zdon: Live Sound / Mastering: Grag Calbi, Sterling Sound, Inc.
- Recorded and Mixed at RPM Studios, New York, NY.
- Art Director: Toni Scott / Layout: Murray Brenman
- Photography: Timothy White / Hand Lettering: Stephen Foster / Illustrations: Terre Roche

Musicians

- Maggie Roche: Singing, piano, synthesizers, keyboard bass
- Terre Roche: Singing, guitars
- Suzzy Roche: Singing, synthesizers, guitars
- Carter Cathcart: Piano on "Losing Our Job", synthesizer strings and horn.
- Libby McLaren: Synthesizers, keyboard bass
- Vince Cherico: Drums, drum programming, percussion
- Fernando Saunders: Bass Guitar
- The Roches: Drum and synthesizer programming
- Larry Fast: Additional synthesizer programming
