= Crossing Delancey =

1988 film directed by Joan Micklin Silver

- Theatrical release poster
- Directed by: Joan Micklin Silver
- Written by: Susan Sandler
- Based on: Crossing Delancey; 1985 play by Susan Sandler
- Produced by: Michael Nozik
- Starring: Amy Irving; Peter Riegert; Jeroen Krabbé; Sylvia Miles
- Cinematography: Theo Van de Sande
- Edited by: Rick Shaine
- Music by: Paul Chihara
- Production company: Warner Bros.
- Distributed by: Warner Bros.
- Release date: August 26, 1988 (New York)
- Running time: 97 minutes
- Country: United States
- Language: English
- Budget: $4 million
- Box office: $16 million (United States)

Crossing Delancey is a 1988 American romantic comedy film adapted by Susan Sandler from her play of the same name, and directed by Joan Micklin Silver. It stars Amy Irving and Peter Riegert. The film also features performances from Reizl Bozyk, David Hyde-Pierce, Sylvia Miles and Rosemary Harris. Amy Irving was nominated for a Golden Globe for the film, for Best Actress in a Motion Picture - Comedy or Musical.

== Plot ==
Isabelle Grossman works for a New York bookstore, where she mingles with the city's literati, whom she idolizes. But outside of work she is lonely and unfulfilled, settling for an occasional night of casual sex with Nick, a married man. When Dutch-American author Anton Maes comes to the bookstore to give a reading, he shows an interest in Isabelle, who is charmed.

Isabelle pays frequent visits to her Yiddish-speaking Bubbe (grandmother)(pronounced "Bubby") Ida, who lives in an Orthodox Jewish neighborhood on the Lower East Side of Manhattan (location of Delancey Street). Anxious for her granddaughter to settle down with a decent Orthodox man, Ida hires a marriage broker. Although enraged, Isabelle grudgingly allows the matchmaker to introduce her in Bubbe's kitchen to Sam Posner.

At first Isabelle is dismissive of Sam, as she is not interested in a man who owns a small business selling pickles and who, she believes, hired the matchmaker. Instead, she sets her sights on Anton and the New York City intelligentsia, but she also feels guilty for how rude she was to Sam. She tries to make it up to him by setting him up with her girlfriend Marilyn. In the process, though, she learns that Sam did not hire the matchmaker, but that he respects her as a fellow business person and talks to her on that basis. Over time, the matchmaker had shown Sam photos of single women in whom he expressed no interest. But he tells Isabelle that when the matchmaker showed him a photo of her, he said he told the matchmaker, "this one I'll meet." He had seen Isabelle with Ida in the neighborhood for many years and admired her. Isabelle is deeply touched, though her friends soon see Sam has given up on her and started dating Marilyn. She invites Sam & Marilyn to a book reading at the bookstore.

At the book reading, Sam shows up alone, as does Anton. Isabelle leaves with Sam, and they go to her apartment. As they are planning to share a drink together, Nick barges in to complain about his wife changing the locks. Sam and Isabelle soon agree to meet the next day at her Bubbe's apartment to go on a date.

After work the next day, however, she is sidelined by Anton and, believing that he is romantically interested in her, goes to his apartment. She discovers instead that the narcissistic Anton wants an assistant he can sleep with, not a real wife or girlfriend. A disgusted Isabelle rejects him and races to her grandmother's apartment, finding Ida sleeping on the couch. Heartbroken, she believes she has ruined her chances with the honest and caring Sam. As she cries, Sam enters from the balcony. The two finally are united and Ida, waking and having feigned senile dementia to keep Sam from leaving, laughs gleefully that her plan has succeeded.

== Cast ==
- Amy Irving as Isabelle Grossman
- Peter Riegert as Sam Posner
- Reizl Bozyk as Bubbe "Ida" Kantor
- Jeroen Krabbé as Anton Maes
- Sylvia Miles as Hannah Mandelbaum
- George Martin as Lionel
- John Bedford Lloyd as Nick
- Claudia Silver as Cecelia Monk
- David Hyde Pierce as Mark (credited as David Pierce)
- Rosemary Harris as Pauline Swift
- Suzzy Roche as Marilyn Cohen
- Amy Wright as Ricki
- Faye Grant as Candyce
- Deborah Offner as Karen
- Kathleen Wilhoite as Myla Bondy
- Moishe Rosenfeld as Rabbi
- Paula Laurence as Diva
- Christine Campbell as Woman In Cab
- Reg E. Cathey as Cab Driver
- Susan Blommaert as Leslie
- Dolores Sutton as Aunt Miriam
- Sam Corsi as Handball Champion
- Pat Oleszko as Herself
- Michael Marisi Ornstein as Mickey (credited as Michael Ornstein)
- Susan Sandler as Molly
- Vincenzo Zafonte as Barber

This was Yiddish theatre star Reizl Bozyk's only film role.

== Release ==
The film opened at the Plaza theatre in New York City on August 26, 1988.

== Reception ==
The film received positive reviews. It currently holds an 82% rating on Rotten Tomatoes based on 87 reviews with the consensus: "A small-scale delight fueled by Amy Irving's irresistible charm, Crossing Delancey celebrates love with contagious optimism."

One retrospective review from 2018 called Crossing Delancey "the ultimate Jewish rom-com" and a rare great story of "outwardly Jewish love".

=== Box office ===
The film was a modest success, grossing $16 million in the United States and Canada against a $4 million budget.

=== Accolades ===
Award	Category	Nominee(s)	Result	Ref.
Artios Awards	Outstanding Achievement in Feature Film Casting – Comedy	Meg Simon and Fran Kumin	Nominated	
Golden Globe Awards	Best Actress in a Motion Picture – Musical or Comedy	Amy Irving	Nominated	

== Soundtrack ==
Crossing Delancey (original motion picture soundtrack)

Studio album by the Roches and Paul Chihara
- Released: Oct 17, 1988
- Genre: Folk
- Label: Varèse Sarabande
- Producer: Paul Chihara

The Roches chronology
No Trespassing (1986)	Crossing Delancey (original motion picture soundtrack) (1988)	Speak (1989)

Professional ratings
Review scores
Source	Rating
AllMusic	2.5/5 stars

Crossing Delancey (Original Motion Picture Soundtrack) is the soundtrack album to the motion picture Crossing Delancey, released October 17, 1988. Instrumental tracks were by Paul Chihara, and songs were performed by (and in some cases written by members of) The Roches.

Suzzy Roche of the Roches played Marilyn, a friend of Isabelle (Irving), in the film. The Roches provided several songs for the soundtrack. One of the songs that was featured in the film, Nocturne, is also featured on the group's 1989 album Speak. An earlier arrangement of their cover of "Come Softly to Me" is featured on their album Another World.

=== Track listing ===
1. Come Softly To Me (credited to Gretchen Christopher, Barbara Ellis, and Gary Troxel)
2. Lucky (written by Terre and David Roche)
3. Anton's Theme
4. Portrait Of Izzy
5. Anton Again
6. Come Softly To Me
7. Sadness
8. Pounding (written by Terre and Suzzy Roche)
9. Lucky
10. Portrait Of Anton
11. Barber Shop
12. Nocturne (written by Margaret Roche)
13. True Love
14. Pounding (written by Terre and Suzzy Roche)
15. Happy Ending
16. Come Softly To Me
- Tracks 1, 2, 6, 8, 9, 12, 14 and 16 are performed by the Roches.
- Tracks 3, 4, 5, 7, 10, 13, 15 composed by Paul Chihara
- Track 11 composed by Sergei Prokofiev
- All songs arranged and orchestrated by Paul Chihara
