= Nurds =

Studio album by the Roches
- Released: September 9, 1980
- Studio: Record Plant, New York
- Length: 37:49
- Label: Warner Bros.
- Producer: Roy Halee

The Roches chronology
The Roches (1979)	Nurds (1980)	Keep on Doing (1982)

Nurds is the second studio album by the American musical trio the Roches, released on Warner Bros. Records in 1980. It peaked at number 130 on the Billboard 200. Nurds was produced by Roy Halee.

== Critical reception ==
Professional ratings
Review scores
Source	Rating
AllMusic	4/5 stars
Robert Christgau	B
MusicHound Rock: The Essential Album Guide	3/5 stars
The Rolling Stone Album Guide	3/5 stars
Spin Alternative Record Guide	8/10

The Rolling Stone review noted that the Roches were "not just entertaining but downright terrifying." The New York Times wrote that "Maggie Roche in particular continues to write songs with droll, offbeat imagery and explicitly personal points of view." The Globe and Mail praised "the anti-star sincerity in their voices and the fragile nature of their stacked vocals, which threaten to fall out of tune at the slightest provocation, but never do."

== Track listing ==
No.	Title	Writer(s)	Length
1.	"Nurds"	Suzzy Roche	4:15
2.	"It's Bad for Me"	Cole Porter	2:45
3.	"Louis"	Terre Roche	3:34
4.	"Bobby's Song"	T. Roche; S. Roche	3:17
5.	"The Boat Family"	Maggie Roche	3:19
6.	"My Sick Mind"	T. Roche	4:06
7.	"The Death of Suzzy Roche"	S. Roche; T. Roche	3:01
8.	"Factory Girl"	Traditional	4:48
9.	"One Season"	M. Roche	4:42
10.	"This Feminine Position"	M. Roche	3:57
Total length:			37:49

== Credits ==
- Recordist: Jon Mathias
- Assistant: Dave Alhard
- Maggie Roche: acoustic guitar, vocals
- Suzzy Roche: acoustic guitar, vocals
- Terre Roche: acoustic guitar, electric guitar, vocals
- Jay Dee Daugherty: drums
- Fred Smith: electric bass guitar
- Lincoln Goines: acoustic bass guitar
- Jon Mathias: electric bass guitar on "Nurds"
- Gabriel Katona: synthesizer
- Bob Conti: percussion
- Bobby Gordon: clarinet on "Bobby's Song"
- Basic tracks and vocals recorded at Record Plant, NYC
- Overdubs: Redwing Studios, Tarzana, California
- Finishing touches: United Western Studios, Los Angeles
- Mastering: Greg Calbi

== Charts ==
Year	Chart	Peak position
1980	US Billboard 200	130
