= Rise Again (songbook) =

2016 folk music fake book

Rise Again: A Group Singing Songbook
- Author: Peter Blood and Annie Patterson (eds)
- Language: English
- Subject: Folk, popular music
- Genre: fake book
- Publisher: Hal Leonard
- Publication date: 2016
- Publication place: USA
- Pages: 304
- ISBN: 978-1-4803-3189-1

Rise Again: A Group Singing Songbook is a sequel to the popular folk music fake book Rise Up Singing, containing chords, lyrics, and sources. It was compiled by Annie Patterson and Peter Blood and released in 2016 by Hal Leonard Books.

== Development ==
Work began on a sequel in 1998, ten years after the original book was published by Sing Out!. Pete Seeger was a member of the initial song selection committee. He originally proposed to Blood and Patterson that they take the new book to Hal Leonard, when it became clear that Sing Out! would be unable to complete the project.

Rise Again was compiled by volunteers, much like Rise Up Singing and its predecessor Winds of the People. Music experts weighed in on particular genres including Mary Flower (for blues), John Roberts (for English traditional songs), Joe Offer (a moderator of the Mudcat Café), and Johanna Halbeisen (curator of the New Song Library).

As an aid to learning the melodies in the book, links to YouTube recordings of all 1200 songs in Rise Again can be found on Patterson and Blood's website.

== Content ==
Pete Seeger, who wrote the introduction to Rise Up Singing, also wrote the preface to Rise Again a year before he died. Billy Bragg wrote the foreword. The cover illustration is by Mary Azarian and the banner illustrations at the beginning of each chapter are by the book's co-editor Annie Patterson. Interior chapter drawings are by Patterson, Meghan Merker (who was the main illustrator for Sing Out! magazine for over 30 years), or by Mona Shiber.

Rise Again contains words and chords to 1200 songs. There is no overlap with the songs in Rise Up Singing. As in Rise Up Singing, chords are written out under the first verse, the chorus and any other section of the song (i.e. bridge). Music is included only for rounds. Rise Again includes three indices—by recording artist, by culture and special genres, and by title.

Songs are grouped into 39 chapters by song genre or subject matter. Chapters are arranged alphabetically, as are songs within chapters. While some chapters have the same titles as in Rise Up Singing, the new songbook has a number of new song genre chapters reflecting the inclusion of more songs from genres other than folk music. Additional chapters include blues, country music, jazz, early rock & roll, British rock, Motown, and other US rock (including a chapter focusing on "millennial" popular songs written since 1995).

The book is available in spiral-bound and paperback versions. It is available in both 7 1/2 by 10 inches (19 cm × 25 cm) and a larger 9 by 12 inches (23 cm × 30 cm) format.

== See also ==
- Deep Community
- Rise Up Singing
