= We Three Kings (The Roches album) =

Studio album by the Roches
- Released: 1990
- Genre: Folk, Christmas music
- Label: Paradox/MCA; rerelease by Rykodisc
- Producer: The Roches, Jeffrey Lesser

The Roches chronology
Speak (1989)	We Three Kings (1990)	A Dove (1992)

Alternative cover
- Cover of the 1994 reissue by Rykodisc

We Three Kings is an album by the American folk trio the Roches, released in 1990. It is a collection of Christmas songs. The sisters wrote two of the album's 24 tracks. We Three Kings is considered a classic of unconventional Christmas music.

MCA Records allowed the album to go out of print; it was reissued by Rykodisc in 1994, after the label had signed the trio. For years, the sisters performed selections of the songs at their annual Bottom Line shows.

== Production ==
The album was produced by the Roches and Jeffrey Lesser. It marked a return to the sisters' roots, as they had first sung together as carolers in Manhattan. Due to their familiarity with the carols, the sisters did many of the songs in one take. We Three Kings was recorded in New York City during a July 1990 heat wave; the sessions were slightly delayed while Maggie Roche got over laryngitis.

Most of the tracks are sung a cappella; it took the Roches six weeks to obtain the vocal strength to get through "For Unto Us a Child Is Born". "Star of Wonder", written by Terre Roche, was composed after a friend died in the Lockerbie bombing. Suzzy Roche wrote "Christmas Passing Through". "Winter Wonderland" is sung using stereotypical New Jersey accents; "Frosty the Snowman" employs a chorus of children. Other songs incorporate elements of Middle Eastern music and Caribbean music.

== Critical reception ==
Professional ratings
Review scores
Source	Rating
AllMusic	4.5/5 stars
Robert Christgau	(neither)
The Encyclopedia of Popular Music	3/5 stars
Entertainment Weekly	B+
MusicHound Rock: The Essential Album Guide	3/5 stars
Ottawa Citizen	4/5 stars
The Rolling Stone Album Guide	3.5/5 stars
Seattle Post-Intelligencer	A
Spin Alternative Record Guide	7/10
Windsor Star	B+

The Globe and Mail thought that "the avant-garde folkies play it pretty straight this time out, using their sisterly harmonies to wade through a generous selection of Christmas favorites." Newsday stated that the Roches "adorn two dozen yuletide standards with their trademark harmonies, skating vocal figure-eights around each other with the navigability of Dancer, Prancer and Vixen."

The St. Petersburg Times deemed the album "wonderful listening" and "an instant classic." The Boston Globe determined that "the sometimes silly sisters take their tongue out of their collective cheek and come up with a classic." The Windsor Star noted that "We Three Kings, while containing the obvious, is definitely not-so-obvious in its arrangements."

AllMusic wrote that, "when they put their formidable vocal chops to work on tunes as potentially complex as 'Angels We Have Heard on High' and 'The Holly and the Ivy',' the results can be as gorgeous as they are unique." The Rolling Stone Album Guide concluded that the album "finds the group returning to its (true) roots as seasonal carolers in Greenwich Village." The Times called the title track "lushly gothic, augmented with a tender oboe and, yup, restless country guitars ... The swooning 'Oooohh' that leads up to the chorus is utterly thrilling." The Seattle Post-Intelligencer deemed it "a perfect showcase for the trio's crystal-clear harmonies and offhand humor." Reviewing the 1994 reissue, the Rocky Mountain News opined: "No doubt about it: We Three Kings may well be the best holiday album of the year."

== Track listing ==
1. "Break Forth O Beauteous Heavenly Light" – 1:35
2. "For Unto Us a Child Is Born" – 3:56
3. "Angels We Have Heard on High" – 1:26
4. "Deck the Halls" – 2:10
5. "Christmas Passing Through" (Suzzy Roche) – 3:41
6. "Sleigh Ride" (Mitchell Parish, Leroy Anderson) – 2:34
7. "Away in a Manger" – 2:09
8. "Here We Come A-Caroling" – 1:31
9. "The Little Drummer Boy" (Katherine Davis, Harry Simeone, Henry Onorati) – 3:18
10. "The Holly and the Ivy" – 1:53
11. "Frosty the Snowman" (Walter Rollins, Steve Nelson) – 2:09
12. "Do You Hear What I Hear?" (Noël Regney, Gloria Shayne) – 3:04
13. "We Three Kings" – 5:30
14. "Star of Wonder" (Terre Roche) – 1:51
15. "Winter Wonderland" (Richard Smith, Felix Bernard) – 1:55
16. "Joy to the World" – 1:15
17. "O Little Town of Bethlehem" – 2:55
18. "Good King Wenceslas" – 3:30
19. "Jingle Bells" – 1:44
20. "The First Noel" – 1:53
21. "God Rest Ye Merry, Gentlemen" – 1:15
22. "It Came Upon the Midnight Clear" – 3:05
23. "O Come, All Ye Faithful" – 1:24
24. "Silver Bells" (Ray Evans, Jay Livingston) – 2:46

== Personnel ==
Musicians

- Maggie Roche – vocals, keyboards, hooves, whistling
- Terre Roche – vocals, guitars, piano
- Suzzy Roche – vocals, guitars, keyboards
- Vince Cherico – drums, drum programming, percussion
- Paul Ossola – bass guitar, upright bass
- Victor Lesser – saxophones
- The Hallmarks (David Roche, Jeffrey Lesser, Vince Cherico) – vocals on "Silver Bells"
- Lucy Roche, Jeannine Schmeltzkopt, Dara Schatt, Lucy Lesser, Kelsey Lesser – vocals on "Frosty the Snowman"

Technical

- Jeffrey Lesser – producer, engineer
- Jeff Lippay – assistant engineer
