= Will You Be My Friend? =

Studio album by the Roches
- Released: 1994; re-released 2007 with bonus track
- Genres: Folk, children's music
- Label: Baby Boom
- Producers: Stewart Lerman, Suzzy Roche

The Roches chronology
A Dove (1992)	Will You Be My Friend? (1994)	Can We Go Home Now (1995)

Alternative cover
- Cover of the 2007 rerelease

Will You Be My Friend? is a studio album by the American folk trio the Roches, released in 1994 on Baby Boom Music. It was the group's only album of children's music. Suzzy Roche considered it among the most satisfying albums on which she had worked. The Roches' brother and some of their children appeared on the album. The title track is about having to make friends at a new school.

== Critical reception ==
Professional ratings
Review scores
Source	Rating
The Encyclopedia of Popular Music	2/5 stars
Orlando Sentinel	4/5 stars

The Orlando Sentinel deemed the album "an all-ages delight." The Salt Lake Tribune called it "quirky, brash and wistful."

AllMusic called the album "a true children's album, featuring songs all thematically aimed at younger listeners ... That the Roches are able to manage this without alienating their adult audience is a testament to their strengths as a band."

== Track listing ==
1. "Do the Boodanee" – 2:16
2. "Disappointed" – 4:23
3. "Will You Be My Friend?" – 3:15
4. "Rover" – 3:02
5. "Uncle Dave" – 2:56
6. "The Laundry" – 3:23
7. "Postcard" – 4:31
8. "When Kids Are Mean" – 3:33
9. "My New Bicycle" – 2:05
10. "Here We Go" – 3:14
11. "Little Bitty Betty" – 2:24
12. "Lovey" – 3:39
13. "Goodnight" – 5:31
