= Keep On Doing =

Studio album by the Roches
- Released: 1982
- Recorded: June 1982
- Genre: Folk
- Length: 38:14
- Label: Warner Bros.
- Producer: Robert Fripp

The Roches chronology
Nurds (1980)	Keep On Doing (1982)	Another World (1985)

Keep On Doing is the third studio album by the folk trio the Roches, released in 1982 on Warner Bros. Records. It is their second collaboration with Robert Fripp, following their 1979 debut album.

== Critical reception ==
Professional ratings
Review scores
Source	Rating
AllMusic	2.5/5 stars
Robert Christgau	A−
Rolling Stone	4/5 stars
The Rolling Stone Album Guide	3.5/5 stars
Spin Alternative Record Guide	9/10

The New York Times opined that "the trio's close-harmony singing reaches an unprecedented richness and complexity." The Christian Science Monitor deemed the album "a charmingly rough-cut LP full of whimsical folk." Less supportive, The Boston Phoenix felt that "the Roches haven't yet become the rule-breaking interpreters of urban, bohemian, feminine experience they once promised to be — perhaps because they draw too often on a common adolescence and a shared conversation for their satire."

The Rolling Stone Album Guide wrote that the trio "regain some oddball focus from another oddball Fripp treatment."

== Track listing ==
1. "The Hallelujah Chorus" (George Frideric Handel) – 3:33
2. "Losing True" (Margaret Roche) – 4:56
3. "Steady with the Maestro" (George Gerdes) – 3:45
4. "The Largest Elizabeth in the World" (Terre Roche) – 3:24
5. "On the Road to Fairfax County" (David Massengill) – 4:47
6. "I Fell in Love" (Terre and Suzzy Roche) – 4:20
7. "The Scorpion Lament" (Margaret Roche) – 3:34
8. "Want Not Want Not" (Suzzy and Terre Roche) – 2:56
9. "Sex Is for Children" (Terre Roche) – 3:38
10. "Keep On Doing What You Do / Jerks on the Loose" (Suzzy and Terre Roche) – 3:58

- "The Hallelujah Chorus" was also released as a single with the exclusive b-side "Second Family" (Suzzy Roche) – 4:14

== Personnel ==
- Recorded by Craig Leon. Assisted by Ken Tracht
- Recorded June, 1982 at Blue Rock Studios, New York City
- Maggie Roche – acoustic guitar, synthesizer, piano, singing
- Terre Roche – acoustic guitar, electric guitar, singing
- Suzzy Roche – acoustic guitar, singing
- Tony Levin – bass guitar
- Bill Bruford – percussion
- Robert Fripp – guitar and devices
- Tony Levin, Bill Bruford and Robert Fripp appear courtesy of E.G. Records
- Photography – front cover – Peter Cunningham
- Back cover – Irene Young
- Front and back cover art direction, design – Rise Daniels

== Charts ==
Year	Chart	Peak position
1982	US Billboard 200	183
