= Rites of Passage (Indigo Girls album) =

Studio album by Indigo Girls
- Released: May 12, 1992; October 3, 2000 (Reissue)
- Recorded: 1992
- Studio: Bearsville (Woodstock, New York)
- Genres: Rock; folk rock
- Length: 55:38
- Label: Epic
- Producer: Peter Collins

Indigo Girls chronology
Nomads Indians Saints (1990)	Rites of Passage (1992)	Swamp Ophelia (1994)

Singles from Rites of Passage
- 1. "Galileo"; 2. "Ghost"

Rites of Passage is the fourth studio album by American folk rock duo the Indigo Girls, released on May 12, 1992, by Epic Records.

== Background and music ==
Rites of Passage was recorded in four months, twice longer than the previous record. The duo invited Siouxsie and the Banshees members to take part to the sessions, drummer Budgie, cello player Martin McCarrick and percussionist Talvin Singh, along with Gang of Four bassist Sara Lee. Singer and guitarist Amy Ray later commented on their choice: "we had dreams with who we wanted to play" adding, that "Budgie is one of my favourite drummers". Other instruments include acoustic guitars, mandolin and world-folk elements. The duo's other singer Emily Saliers stated that Ray "really wanted to have a Celtic feel to certain things and that happened". Musically the album was "more colorful and punchy" (The Washington Post) compared to their previous material. Critic Mike Joyce noted that the themes of the songs were "pain and suffering, fear and loathing, angst and anger, desire and dread". Orlando Sentinel wrote the duo's "lyrics are highly personal with a strong literary bent".

== Release ==
The lead single "Galileo" received significant airplay on radio and MTV in the US, and consequently, Rites of Passage nearly entered in the top 20 of the Billboard 200. The album was reissued and remastered on CD in 2000 with two bonus tracks.

== Critical reception ==
Professional ratings
Review scores
Source	Rating
AllMusic	3.5/5 stars
Chicago Tribune	3/4 stars
Down Beat	4/5 stars
Entertainment Weekly	B−
Q	3/5 stars
The Rolling Stone Album Guide	3/5 stars

The Washington Post wrote that "the arrangements ... are more colorful and punchy, and every now and then the duo even manages to inject a little welcome humor into its otherwise dreary musings." Trouser Press wrote that producer Peter Collins expunges "the folk patina to reveal a crystalline mainstream pop center around the snappy, subtle rhythms of bassist Sara Lee and drummer Jerry Marotta."

== Track listing ==
No.	Title	Writer(s)	Length
1.	"Three Hits"	Amy Ray	3:10
2.	"Galileo"	Emily Saliers	4:12
3.	"Ghost"	Saliers	5:16
4.	"Joking"	Ray	3:33
5.	"Jonas and Ezekial"	Ray	4:08
6.	"Love Will Come to You"	Saliers	4:37
7.	"Romeo and Juliet"	Mark Knopfler	4:46
8.	"Virginia Woolf"	Saliers	5:27
9.	"Chickenman"	Ray	5:44
10.	"Airplane"	Saliers	3:21
11.	"Nashville"	Ray	3:57
12.	"Let It Be Me"	Saliers	3:54
13.	"Cedar Tree"	Ray	3:48

2000 reissue bonus tracks
No.	Title	Writer(s)	Length
14.	"Three Hits" (Live from Eddie's Attic, Atlanta)	Ray	3:17
15.	"Love Will Come to You" (Live from Eddie's Attic, Atlanta)	Saliers	4:51

== Personnel ==
Indigo Girls

- Amy Ray – vocals, guitars
- Emily Saliers – vocals, guitars (all tracks except 7)

Additional personnel

- Sara Lee – bass (1–5, 8, 9, 11–13 & bonus 14 & 15)
- Budgie – drums and percussion (1, 5, 9), marimba and claves (8)
- Lisa Germano – fiddle (1, 2, 11, 12)
- Ronan Browne – uilleann pipes (1, 13), low whistle (12)
- Dónal Lunny – bouzouki and bodhran (1, 13)
- Jerry Marotta – drums (2, 3, 6, 9, 11–13 & bonus 14, 15) percussion (2, 3, 6, 9–13 & bonus 14, 15), piano (2)
- Talvin Singh – percussion (2, 6, 11, 12)
- Martin McCarrick – cello and accordion (2, 8, 11, 12)
- Jackson Browne and David Crosby – backing vocals (2, 12)
- John Jennings – electric guitar (3, 9, 12), slide guitar (13)
- Simone Simonton – cymbals and sidestick (3)
- Jai Winding – piano (3)
- Michael Kamen – string arrangements, conductor (3)
- Kenny Aronoff – drums and percussion (4)
- Benmont Tench – organ (4)
- Edgar Meyer – acoustic bass (6, 8, 9)
- Maggie Roche – backing vocals (8, 10), piano (10)
- Terre Roche and Suzzy Roche – backing vocals (8, 10)
- Michael Lorant – backing vocals (9)
- Sandy Garfinkle – harmonica (11)
- Nollaig Ní Chathasaigh (also known as Nollaig Casey) – Irish fiddle (12, 13)
- Uncredited – harmonica (9)
- Jane Scarpantoni – cello (bonus 14, 15)
- Scarlet Rivera – violin (bonus 14, 15)

== Charts ==
Chart (1992)	Peak position
Australian Albums (ARIA)	110
US Billboard 200	21

== Certifications ==
Region	Certification	Certified units/sales
United States (RIAA)	Platinum	1,000,000^{^}
^{^} Shipments figures based on certification alone.
