= The American Songbag =

American anthology of folk songs

First edition

The American Songbag is an anthology of American folksongs compiled by the poet Carl Sandburg and published by Harcourt, Brace and Company in 1927. It was enormously popular and was in print continuously for more than seventy years. Melodies from it were used in Alec Wilder's Names from the War (1961).

According to the musicologist Judith Tick:

As a populist poet, Sandburg bestowed a powerful dignity on what the '20s called the "American scene" in a book he called a "ragbag of stripes and streaks of color from nearly all ends of the earth ... rich with the diversity of the United States." Reviewed widely in journals ranging from the New Masses to Modern Music, The American Songbag influenced a number of musicians. Pete Seeger, who calls it a "landmark", saw it "almost as soon as it came out". The composer Elie Siegmeister took it to Paris with him in 1927, and he and his wife Hannah "were always singing these songs. That was home. That was where we belonged."

== See also ==
- Rise Up Singing
