= Moonswept =

Studio album by the Roches
- Released: 2007
- Genre: Folk
- Label: 429
- Producers: Stewart Lerman, the Roches

The Roches chronology
The Collected Works of the Roches (2003)	Moonswept (2007)	Rhino HiFive: The Roches (2007)

Professional ratings
Review scores
Source	Rating
AllMusic	4.5/5 stars
Robert Christgau	(dud)
PopMatters	5/10 stars

Moonswept is the final studio album by the folk trio the Roches, released in 2007. The trio did not release any further studio albums prior to the death of Maggie Roche in 2017.

== Track listing ==
1. "Us Little Kids" – 3:11
2. "Only You Know How" – 4:25
3. "No Shoes" – 4:11
4. "Moonswept" – 2:59
5. "Family of Bones" – 3:01
6. "That Naughty Lady of Shady Lane" – 3:35
7. "Long Before" – 3:17
8. "Piggy Mask" – 3:36
9. "Huh" – 2:16
10. "Stop Performing" – 3:11
11. "Gung Ho" – 3:13
12. "Instead I Choose" – 3:29
13. "September 11th at the Shambhala Center" – 4:22
14. "Jesus Shaves" – 4:17
