= The Collected Works of the Roches =

Compilation album by The Roches
- Released: September 9, 2003
- Genre: Folk, folk rock
- Label: Rhino Records
- Producer: various

The Roches chronology
Can We Go Home Now (1995)	The Collected Works of the Roches (2003)	Moonswept (2007)

Professional ratings
Review scores
Source	Rating
AllMusic	4/5 stars

The Collected Works of the Roches is a compilation album by The Roches, released in 2003.

== Track listing ==
1. "Hammond Song"
2. "Mister Sellack"
3. "The Troubles"
4. "The Train"
5. "The Married Men (Live)"
6. "One Season"
7. "Nurds"
8. "The Hallelujah Chorus"
9. "Losing True"
10. "Want Not Want Not"
11. "Keep On Doing What You Do / Jerks on the Loose"
12. "Love Radiates Around"
13. "Another World"
14. "Face Down at Folk City"
15. "Love to See You"
16. "Big Nuthin'"
17. "Everyone Is Good"
18. "Ing"
19. "A Dove"
