= Holy Smoke =

Holy Smoke may refer to:

== Film, TV and media ==
- Holy Smoke!, a film directed by Jane Campion, with Kate Winslet and Harvey Keitel
- Damian Thompson's conservative Catholic blog for The Daily Telegraph

== Music ==
- Holy Smoke!, comedy album by Richard Pryor 1976
- Holy Smoke (Gin Wigmore album)
- Holy Smoke (Peter Murphy album)
- "Holy Smoke" (song), a song by Iron Maiden
- Holy Smoke (2005), song on All Hell (Los Campesinos! album) 2024

== See also ==
- Holy Smokes
