= A Dove =

Studio album by the Roches
- Released: 1992
- Genre: Folk-pop
- Length: 43:58
- Label: MCA
- Producer: Stewart Lerman

The Roches chronology
We Three Kings (1990)	A Dove (1992)	Will You Be My Friend? (1994)

A Dove is an album by the American vocal trio the Roches, released in 1992 on MCA Records. The trio supported the album with a North American tour.

== Production ==
The album was produced by Stewart Lerman. The sisters wrote the songs, which they allowed Lerman and the backing musicians to arrange. "You're the Two" is about a ménage à trois.

== Critical reception ==
Professional ratings
Review scores
Source	Rating
AllMusic	4.5/5 stars
Calgary Herald	B−
Robert Christgau	A
Rolling Stone	4/5 stars
Windsor Star	C

Newsday wrote that the album "walks an oxymoronic line between the maudlin and the flip." The Calgary Herald determined that the songs are "like confessions to an analyst, raw sensations and intelligent impressions spilling out on rivulets of guilt."

The Windsor Star concluded that "there's no denying the power the Roches command as a group but individually as writers they have too many misses and not enough hits this time out." The New York Times opined that "even the more whimsical numbers ... carry undertones of loss, loneliness and unease."

== Track listing ==
1. "Ing" – 3:03
2. "Troubled Love" – 3:24
3. "A Dove" – 5:31
4. "Somebody's Gonna Have to Be Me" – 3:53
5. "Expecting Your Love" – 4:45
6. "Answered Prayers" – 3:27
7. "Too Tough Hide" – 4:50
8. "Beautiful Love of God" – 4:27
9. "You're the One" – 3:18
10. "You're the Two" – 3:18
11. "Maid of the Seas" – 4:19
