= Nameless Coffeehouse =

Coordinates: 42°22′28.33″N 71°07′09.41″W

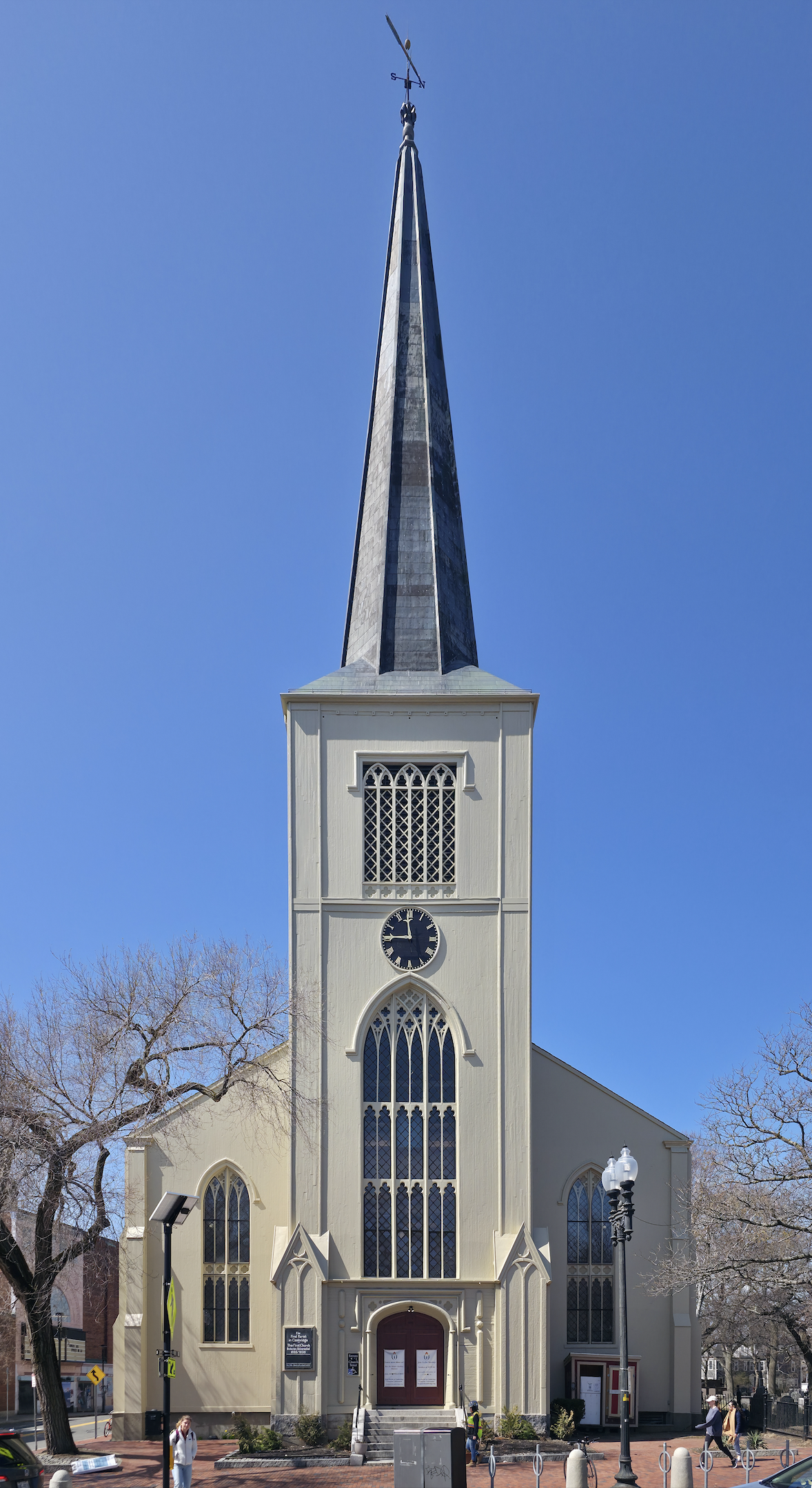
The First Parish Unitarian Universalist Church in Harvard Square, where the coffeehouse is located.

The Nameless Coffeehouse, in Cambridge, Massachusetts, opened in 1967 and is now New England's oldest all-volunteer coffeehouse. Located in the First Parish Unitarian Universalist Church in Harvard Square, the "Nameless," as it is affectionately known, currently presents a six-concert schedule showcasing acoustic music and comedy for a moderate suggested donation ($8–$15 for the 2011 season).

From its birth during the folk revival in the 1960s, The Nameless has been influential in the local folk music scene, nurturing performers in the early stages of their careers, encouraging them to hone their craft, and providing a receptive audience. The Nameless continues to highlight performances by local original singer-songwriters. Performers who have played the Nameless include Mary Chapin Carpenter, Tracy Chapman, Patty Larkin, The Story (Jonatha Brooke and Jennifer Kimball), Ellis Paul, Dar Williams, John Gorka, Bob Franke, Ric Ocasek, James "Hutch" Hutchinson, Geoff Bartley, Dean Stevens, and Greg Greenway, as well as comedians Andy Kaufman and Jay Leno. Fred Small, as of 2009 the minister of the First Parish, also has performed at the Coffeehouse.

When it first opened, the Nameless was managed by Harvard students, who were joined, by the early 1970s, by students from MIT and later Tufts University as well. Through 1983, the Coffeehouse was open Friday and Saturday evenings during the school year, and both music and refreshments were provided free of charge, although donations were encouraged and accepted.

The Nameless had an environment that was very counter-culture. On Friday afternoon, one or more co-managers, including some from Harvard Law, would show up at the church and convert the parlor room into the Nameless Coffeehouse, assembling a stage and the music system. The kitchen was readied to serve cofree, tea, juice or a McCormack (a drink created by one of our frequent visitors, named McCormack), which consisted of organge juice, milk, and tea. The chairs were set up in rows, the signed was posted outside on the sidewalk, and once the evening was dark the performers, who had been previously auditioned by staff began showing up, and were introduced by staff, to begin their 20-30 minute acoustic sets. Halfway through the show, a manager would take the stage and talk about the concept of "free" and encourage those attending to give, and a jug was passed to deposit money, and a lot of money was given. So much so, that there was always a kitty and two Live At The Nameless albums were produced over the years. At the end of the evening, whoever stayed and helped convert the coffeehouse back into a church parlor room, shared pizza with staff ordered in at 2AM from nearby HiFi Pizza, and yellow cabs were ordered to take everyone home that needed a ride. Such was the spirit of the Nameless.

Local folk musicians preferred the Nameless, where they performed for free, to other traditional pay venues, as they could try new music, felt no pressure, and the audiences were always grateful and showed their appreciation. When Tracy Chapman played at the Nameless, she visited from Tufts where she was in school at the time and unknown. The Nameless was her first public venue. When she auditioned, she was immediately noticed due to her style and unique voice. She was given a center spot and played at the Nameless a few weeks later to a rapturous audience.

The Nameless has weathered many changes over the years, and confronted many challenges to stay open and viable. Its minimal costs continue to be met by door proceeds and donated goods and services. The present volunteer crew are veteran volunteers and supporters of the local music scene. Sound man Doug Scott has been running sound since the mid-1980s.

The Coffeehouse still offers a limited number of free admissions to concerts for volunteers, arranged in advance through the volunteer coordinator. Information on volunteer opportunities is available at The Nameless website.
