= Can We Go Home Now =

Studio album by the Roches
- Released: May 30, 1995
- Genre: Folk, folk rock
- Label: Rykodisc
- Producer: Stewart Lerman, the Roches

The Roches chronology
Will You Be My Friend? (1994)	Can We Go Home Now (1995)	The Collected Works of the Roches (2003)

Professional ratings
Review scores
Source	Rating
AllMusic	3/5 stars
Robert Christgau	(2-star Honorable Mention)

Can We Go Home Now is the ninth studio album by the folk trio the Roches, released on May 30, 1995, on Rykodisc.

== Track listing ==
1. "The Great Gaels" – 0:20
2. "Move" – 4:00
3. "You (Make My Life Come True)" – 5:32
4. "Christlike" – 5:39
5. "Home Away from Home" – 4:06
6. "Can We Go Home Now" – 8:39
7. "When You're Ready" – 4:55
8. "I'm Someone Who Loves You" – 4:27
9. "So" – 4:48
10. "Holidays" – 3:41
11. "My Winter Coat" – 8:28
