= Deep Community =

Deep Community: Adventures in the Modern Folk Underground is a book by Boston Globe journalist Scott Alarik with photographs by Robert Corwin. It was published in 2003 by Black Wolf Press. The book is a compilation of over 120 articles by the author that appeared in either The Boston Globe or Sing Out! between 1992 and 2002. The compilation includes interviews and stories about many of the key figures in contemporary folk music in America and the United Kingdom. Some of the writing is focused on the folk music scene in the Boston, Massachusetts area. The book is 416 pages and contains 96 photographs of the featured musicians.

== Reviews ==
The book received a great deal of positive press in folk music circles. Like the music that it describes, however, it appears to have been largely ignored by the mainstream media.

=== Quotes ===
Several of New England's best known exponents of folk music offered praise that was included on the book's dust jacket:

- "This is the best reflection I've ever seen of the world I travel, by the person best suited to document it. Scott Alarik takes thirty years of experience as a journalist and performer and shows us how folk and roots music has survived and thrived in the nooks and cranies of the music world Let's hope the corporate music machine never gets its hands on this book." Ellis Paul
- "Scott Alarik is one of the best writers in America. You'll enjoy this book." Pete Seeger
- "The finest folk writer in the country." Dar Williams

== Contents (incomplete) ==
1. "How is a modern folk star measured?" Garnet Rogers, Greg Brown, Nerissa & Katryna Nields, January 25, 2002.
2. "Why the pop music industry is ignoring folk music—and why that may be good news", Emmylou Harris, Gillian Welch, Joan Osborne, Emily Saliers of the Indigo Girls, Patty Larkin, John Schoenberger of "Radio & Records magazine", July 29, 2001.
3. "Dar Williams: Her battle cry of Kindness", Dar Williams, August 20, 2000.
4. "Young stars stick to their roots", Nickel Creek, Kate Rusby, the Waifs, April 26, 2002.
5. "No more awards!" Pete Seeger, April 26, 1996.
6. "The quintessential Boston Songwriter finds his roots in Woody Guthrie", Ellis Paul, December 4, 1998.
7. "King of the hip-hop blues", Chris Thomas King, November 16, 2001.
8. "Irish music gets younger and older at the same time", Sharon Shannon, Karan Casey, Niamh Parsons, March 16, 2001.
9. "Did they get it right when they called it Celtic music?" Johnny Cunningham, Christian Lemaitre, Kevin Burke, November 5, 1992.
10. "The community coffeehouse: Quiet heart of the folk circuit", Greg Greenway, the Shaw Brothers, A New Song Coffeehouse director Jerry Christen, November 11, 2001.
11. "Folk's family feud: traditionalists vs. songwriters", Eric Andersen, Christine Lavin, Eddie from Ohio's Robbie Schaefer, Tony Barrand, Steve Tilston, music manager David Tamulevich, June 27, 1999.
12. "The roots of klezmer revival", Hankys Netsky of the Klezmer Conservatory Band, October 10, 1999.
13. "Donal Lunny and the 'invention' of Celtic music", Donal Lunny, August 14, 1999.
14. "Bill Morrissey's 'Three R's': Writing, rural, and roots", Bill Morrissey, Autumn, 2001.
15. "Folk dancing stays on its feet", The Folk Arts Center of New England, April 4, 1999.
16. "Why Ireland's biggest recording star hasn't 'gone huge' in America", Mary Black, Karan Casey, & Seamus Egan of Solas, November 13, 1998.
17. "Altan keeps its promise", Mairéad Ní Mhaonaigh, July 17, 1998.
18. "Folk music sprouts in the suburbs", Garnet Rogers, manager David Tamulevich, coffeehouse directors Michael Moran, Jim & Beth Sargent, September 28, 1997.
19. "Her 'mom music' made Lori McKenna a songwriting star", Lori McKenna, December 7, 2001.
20. "Singing the praises of family life", Kate Campbell, Maria Sangiolo, Deborah Silverstein, sociologist Alex Liazos, April 27, 2001.
21. "Appearing in a living room near you: Folk music & house concerts", Barbara Kessler, Susie Burke & David Surette, house concert producers Laurie Laba, Neal Ecksteine, Gary Martin, and Barry Kasindorf.
22. "The blues lights his fires", Guy Davis, January 12, 1996.
23. "Finding peace beneath the blues", Chris Smither, March 20, 1997.
24. "Joan Baez looks back at her brand-new career", Joan Baez, Dar Williams, August 3, 1997.
25. "Red House Records: the little label that could", Joan Baez, John Gorka, Suzzy Roche, Red House president Bob Feldman, August 3, 1997.
26. "Having a 'John Gorka career'", John Gorka, music manager David Tamulevich, February 5, 1999.
27. "The McGarrigle family business", Kate & Anna McGarrigle, January 29, 1999.
28. "Why didn't the music industry jump on the 'O Brother' bandwagon?" Emmylou Harris, directors Joel & Ethan Coen and Maggie Greenwald, producer Christopher Covert, record executive Kira Florita, "Billboard" editor Timothy White, June 24, 2001.
29. "Boston a bluegrass hotbead?" Lynn Morris, Matt Glaser, Everett Lilly, Bill Keith, International Bluegrass Music Association president Dan Hayes, February 23, 2001.
30. "Club Passim: 40 years of folk in Harvard Square", Patty Larkin, Ellis Paul, Jim Kweskin, Catie Curtis, Betsy Siggins Schmidt, January 15, 1999.

== See also ==
- Sing Out!
