= Rise Up Singing =

Folk music song book

Rise Up Singing: The Group-Singing Songbook
- Author: Peter Blood and Annie Patterson (eds)
- Language: English
- Subject: Folk, popular music
- Genre: fake book
- Publisher: Sing Out! Corporation
- Publication date: 1988
- Publication place: USA
- Pages: 288
- ISBN: 0-9626704-7-2
- OCLC: 26641560

Rise Up Singing is a popular folk music fake book containing chords, lyrics, and sources. There are 1200 songs in the 2004 edition.

The book does not include notation of the songs' melodies (with the exception of the two sections on rounds), meaning that users must either know the tune or find a recording, to be able to learn many of the songs. It was first published in 1988 by Sing Out!. It is edited by Peter Blood and Annie Patterson. Songs are arranged by category: there are 35 different categories arranged in alphabetical order, plus artist, subject, title, culture, holiday, and musical indices.

Since the book includes only lyrics and chords without notation, it is relatively compact in size and also relatively inexpensive. Recordings of the songs, which can be used as learning tools, have been made for each song in the book, and are now available on CD and the book website. Only enough of each song is included to learn the tune; not all verses are sung.

The book grew out of the 1973 homemade songbook by Peter Blood, Winds of the People.

In the United States, there are monthly sings (singalongs) where groups gather to sing selections from Rise Up Singing.

== See also ==
- Rise Again, the sequel to Rise Up Singing
- The American Songbag
