= Susan Sandler =

American writer

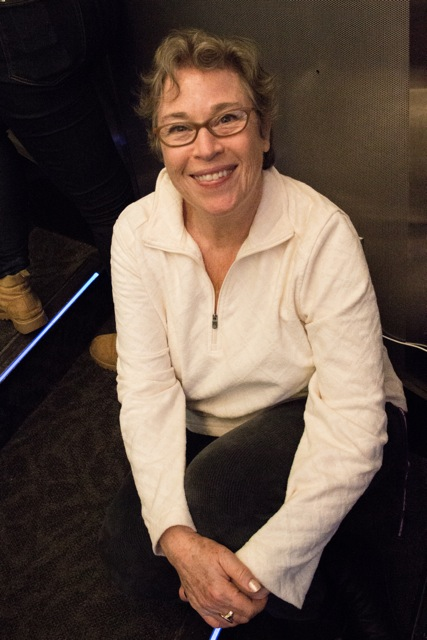
SusanSandlerHEADSHOT

Susan Sandler is an American writer and professor at New York University's Tisch School of the Arts. She has numerous writing credits but is probably best known for her play Crossing Delancey, which she also adapted into a film with the same name starring Amy Irving and directed by Joan Micklin Silver.

== Screenplays/Teleplays ==
- Crossing Delancey (based on her original play)
- Friends at Last (starring Kathleen Turner) - CBS
- Love Invents Us (based on the novel by Amy Bloom) - Sarah Green Productions
- The Florence Greenberg Story (starring Bette Midler) - TNT
- A Lesson in Love - Grossbart-Barnett
- Flying in Peace - Columbia Pictures Television
- Cost of Living - Hallmark Channel
- Lonelyville - Columbia Pictures
- I Slept for Science - Scott Rudin Productions
- Glitter Girls - Jersey Films
- Too Many Cooks - Interscope
- Funny That Way - Nantucket Film Festival

== Plays ==
- Crossing Delancey. Richard F. Shepard reviewed this play in the New York Times in the May 2, 1985 edition. The play opened at the Jewish Repertory Theater.
- Under the Bed - premiered at The Caldwell Theatre
- The Renovation - (Actors Theatre of Louisville)

== Off Broadway ==
- The Moaner - directed by Dennie Gordon
- Kinfolks and Mountain Music - based on the stories of Gurney Norman
- Tots - Ensemble Studio Theatre (Sandler also directed)
