= Reizl Bozyk =

American actress

- Born: Róża Lewebrowska; May 13, 1914; Bydgoszcz, Poland
- Died: September 30, 1993 (aged 79); New York City
- Other names: Rose Bozyk, Róża Bożyk
- Occupation: Yiddish theatre actress

Reizl Bozyk (born 13 May 1914 – 1 October 1993), also known as Rose Bozyk and Róża Bożyk, was a Polish-born American actress of the Yiddish theatre. Her claim to mainstream fame was her sole film role, playing the interfering grandmother of Amy Irving in Joan Micklin Silver's film Crossing Delancey (1988). She also appeared in a memorable Law and Order episode "Night and Fog" which aired in season 3.

== Life and career ==
Reizl Bozyk was born on 13 May 1914 into a stage family in Bydgoszcz, Prussian Poland, where her mother, the actress Lea Lewebrowska, was acting in Joseph Lateiner's operetta The Jewish heart (Dos yidishe harts). Her father, Abram Lewebrowski, a character comic, died when she was only thirteen years old. At a very young age, she began acting with her mother's troupe. In 1935 she married actor Max Bozyk.

Bozyk was an enduring star of the Yiddish stage in New York City, appearing in hundreds of productions, often as a comedian and later as the familiar mother or mother-in-law character who often stole the show. She began acting in the Yiddish theater in Poland at the age of 5 or 6, performing first with her parents and then with Max Bozyk, whom she later married.

Max and Reizl Bozyk were performing in Argentina in 1939 when the Nazis overran Poland. They had left behind a son in Poland, who was killed. They came to New York City in 1941. For nearly three decades, they were inseparable on the Yiddish stage, starring in one play or revue after another. Summers were spent performing in the Borscht Belt.

In an interview when Crossing Delancey opened, Bozyk joked that the 37 years spent with her husband had been like 74 because they'd spent their entire days and nights together.

In 1970, after a performance at New York's Town Hall, her husband collapsed and died. Reizl continued to appear in performances, touring the country in Yiddish revues. She went on to appear in New York's "Town Hall" with the celebrated Israeli star Mary Soreano and all-star revues. In 1989, she played her first stage role in English, appearing in the comedy Social Security directed by Peter Lowey at the Forum Theater in Metuchen, New Jersey. The following year she recreated her Crossing Delancey role on stage in Florida, and was due to tour again when she suddenly died.

== Death ==
She died on 1 October 1993 at St. Vincent's Hospital Medical Center in New York City, aged 79, from undisclosed causes.

She was buried at Mount Hebron Cemetery in Flushing, Queens.
