= The Roches (album) =

Studio album by the Roches
- Released: June 16, 1979
- Recorded: September–November 1978
- Studios: The Hit Factory, New York City
- Genre: Folk
- Length: 39:53
- Label: Warner Bros.
- Producer: Robert Fripp

The Roches chronology
Seductive Reasoning (1975)	The Roches (1979)	Nurds (1980)

The Roches is the debut album by the Roches, released on the Warner Bros. Records in April 1979. The album was produced and features electric guitar parts by Robert Fripp; also playing on the album are percussionist Jimmy Maelen and Fripp's future King Crimson bandmate Tony Levin.

== Background ==
Paul Simon had encountered Maggie and Terre Roche earlier, and asked them to sing on the song "Was a Sunny Day" on his 1973 album There Goes Rhymin' Simon. Despite further support, the Roches disliked the involvement of Simon's record company, particularly their advice that the sisters "wear hipper clothes." Terre Roche later said:

We were humiliated... We wanted to get out of the whole situation. We had a friend in Hammond, Louisiana, who was running a kung fu school. We gave up our apartment and told the record company, ‘We’re not going to promote the record anymore; we’re going away for a while.’ This was two weeks after the record came out. Maggie wrote the "Hammond Song" about the whole experience.

== Reception ==
Professional ratings
Review scores
Source	Rating
AllMusic	4.5/5 stars
Pitchfork	9.5/10
Rolling Stone	3.5/5 stars
The Rolling Stone Album Guide	5/5 stars
Spin Alternative Record Guide	10/10
The Village Voice	A

The album was acclaimed by contemporary critics. John Rockwell of The New York Times called it "... the best pop record of 1979 thus far. In fact, it's so superior that it will be remarkable if another disk comes along to supplant it as best album of the year." Rockwell subsequently picked it as the best album of that year, stating that it was "... also the scariest record, because the Roches probe emotions and even fears that most pop — most art, even — does not approach." Jay Cocks of Time called it "startling, lacerating and amusing". The Village Voice critic Robert Christgau said that "Robert Fripp's austere production of this witty, pretty music not only abjures alien instrumentation but also plays up the quirks of the Roches' less-than-commanding voices and acoustic guitars. Thus it underscores their vulnerability and occasional desperation and counteracts their flirtations with the coy and the fey. The result is not a perfect record, but rather one whose imperfections are lovingly mitigated." It was voted #11 for the year in The Village Voice's annual Pazz & Jop Critics Poll.

Retrospective assessments have also been positive. AllMusic characterized it as a "mischievous and highly original folk blend". Rating the album 10/10 in the Spin Alternative Record Guide, Ann Powers praised Fripp's guitar accompaniment and spare "audio vérité" production but noted his efforts "would be merely a gorgeous surface if not for the songs themselves. Suzzy and Terre each contribute winners, but it's Maggie whose genius dominates." The Rolling Stone Album Guide gave it five stars, calling it an "unprecedented thrill" and a Greenwich Village folk parallel to the New York punk explosion.

== Cover versions and samples ==
"The Married Men" was covered by Phoebe Snow on her 1979 album Against the Grain.

"Hammond Song" was covered by the Colourfield on their 1985 debut album Virgins and Philistines and by Whitney on their 2020 album Candid. It was also covered by salyu x salyu on the 2012 album s(o)un(d)beams+. Wolf Alice covered it on their expanded edition of their 2025 album The Clearing.

The Avalanches sampled "Hammond Song" on "We Will Always Love You", the first single from their 2020 album of the same name.

== Track listing ==
1. "We" (Suzzy Roche, Terre Roche, Margaret Roche) – 2:35
2. "Hammond Song" (Margaret Roche) – 5:46
3. "Mr. Sellack" (Terre Roche) – 4:03
4. "Damned Old Dog" (Margaret Roche) – 4:07
5. "The Troubles" (Suzzy Roche, Terre Roche, Margaret Roche) – 3:27
6. "The Train" (Suzzy Roche) – 3:30
7. "The Married Men" (Margaret Roche) – 4:32
8. "Runs in the Family" (Terre Roche) – 3:29
9. "Quitting Time" (Margaret Roche) – 4:19
10. "Pretty and High" (Margaret Roche) – 4:05

== Personnel ==
Musicians

- Suzzy Roche – vocals, guitar
- Maggie Roche – vocals, guitar, synthesizer (on "Quitting Time")
- Terre Roche – vocals, guitar
- Robert Fripp – electric guitar, Fripperies (on "Hammond Song")
- Tony Levin – bass guitar
- Jim Maelen – triangle, shaker
- Larry Fast – synthesizer programmer

Production

- Producer: Robert Fripp
- Engineer: Ed Sprigg
- Assistant Engineer: Jon Smith
- Recorded at The Hit Factory in New York City during September, October and November 1978

Other credits

- Art direction: Peter Whorf
- Design: Brad Kanawyer
- Photography: Gary Heery

== Charts ==
Year	Chart	Peak position
1979	US Billboard 200	58
