= Seductive Reasoning =

- Original cover, 1975

Studio album by Maggie and Terre Roche
- Released: 1975
- Recorded: 1974–1975
- Genre: Folk
- Label: Columbia
- Producers: Paul Simon, Paul Samwell-Smith, David Hood and Jimmy Johnson

Maggie and Terre Roche chronology
Seductive Reasoning (1975)	The Roches (1979)

Alternative cover
- Reissue LP cover, 1981

Professional ratings
Review scores
Source	Rating
AllMusic	4.5/5 stars
Robert Christgau	B+ link

Seductive Reasoning is the debut album by the sibling folk duo Maggie and Terre Roche, released in 1975 on Columbia Records. It precedes their 1979 debut album as a trio, The Roches.

== Track listing ==
All tracks composed by Margaret Roche, except where indicated.

1. "Underneath the Moon" – 2:33
2. "Down the Dream" – 3:51
3. "Wigglin' Man" (Margaret Roche, Terre Roche) – 2:27
4. "West Virginia" – 3:34
5. "If You Emptied Out All Of Your Pockets You Could Not Make The Change" – 2:57
6. "Telephone Bill" – 2:44
7. "Malachy's" – 3:21
8. "Burden of Proof" – 2:40
9. "The Mountain People" – 3:16
10. "Jill of All Trades" – 3:26

== Personnel ==
Musicians:

- Maggie Roche – piano and guitar
- Terre Roche – guitar
- The Muscle Shoals Rhythm Section:
  - Roger Hawkins – drums
  - David Hood – bass
  - Barry Beckett– keyboards
  - Pete Carr – guitar
  - Jimmy Johnson – guitar

Additional musicians:

- Johnny Gimble – fiddle
- George Marge – electric clarinet
- Ann Odell – strings
- John Hall – electric guitar
- Paul Simon – guitar
- Jerry Masters – bass

Production:

- 1, 2, 3, 6, 8, 9: produced by David Hood and Jimmy Johnson; engineers – Greg Hamm, Steve Melton, Jerry Masters
- 4, 7, 10: produced by Paul Samwell Smith; engineer – Martin Levan
- 5: produced by Paul Simon; engineers – Steve Melton, Phil Ramone

Cover photo by Chip Berlet.
