= Sing-along =

Social event involving collective singing

A sing-along is an event of singing in unison at school assemblies, gatherings or parties; common genres are folk songs, pop songs, hymns and drinking songs.

== Among animals ==
Group vocalizing is known in several animal species. For example, a lion pride and a pack of wolves are known to vocalize together (supposedly to defend their territory), although some scholars do not characterize their vocalizations as "singing". Gibbons sing in family groups (couples sing together, sometimes with their offspring). Various species of birds also sing in duets and choruses, particularly in the tropics.

== In human prehistory ==
Singing in groups is one of the universal features of human musical cultures, and group singing has been often suggested as the primary form of the early human musical activity. It has been suggested that human group singing was primarily promoting the cohesiveness within human groups, and was possibly used to defend human groups from predators and competitors.

== Forms of group singing ==
In human societies, group singing can be limited to certain sexes, ages, and social groups. Group singing can be also different in the actual sound, for example, singing in unison or octaves, accompanied or a capella or singing in harmony (in different parts, like canon). Informal group singing can be accompanied by body movements, stomping, or clapping. Organized, regularly scheduled sing-along sessions are held in both cities and rural areas, often referred to as "song circles" and sometimes organized by formal groups or organizations. Sometimes individual musicians will share their own songs with the group, but more often an individual will request a song that the whole group will sing together.

== See also ==
- Rise Up Singing
- Hamiltunes (a series of sing-alongs of the American musical Hamilton)
