= Ellis Paul =

American singer-songwriter and musician (born 1965)

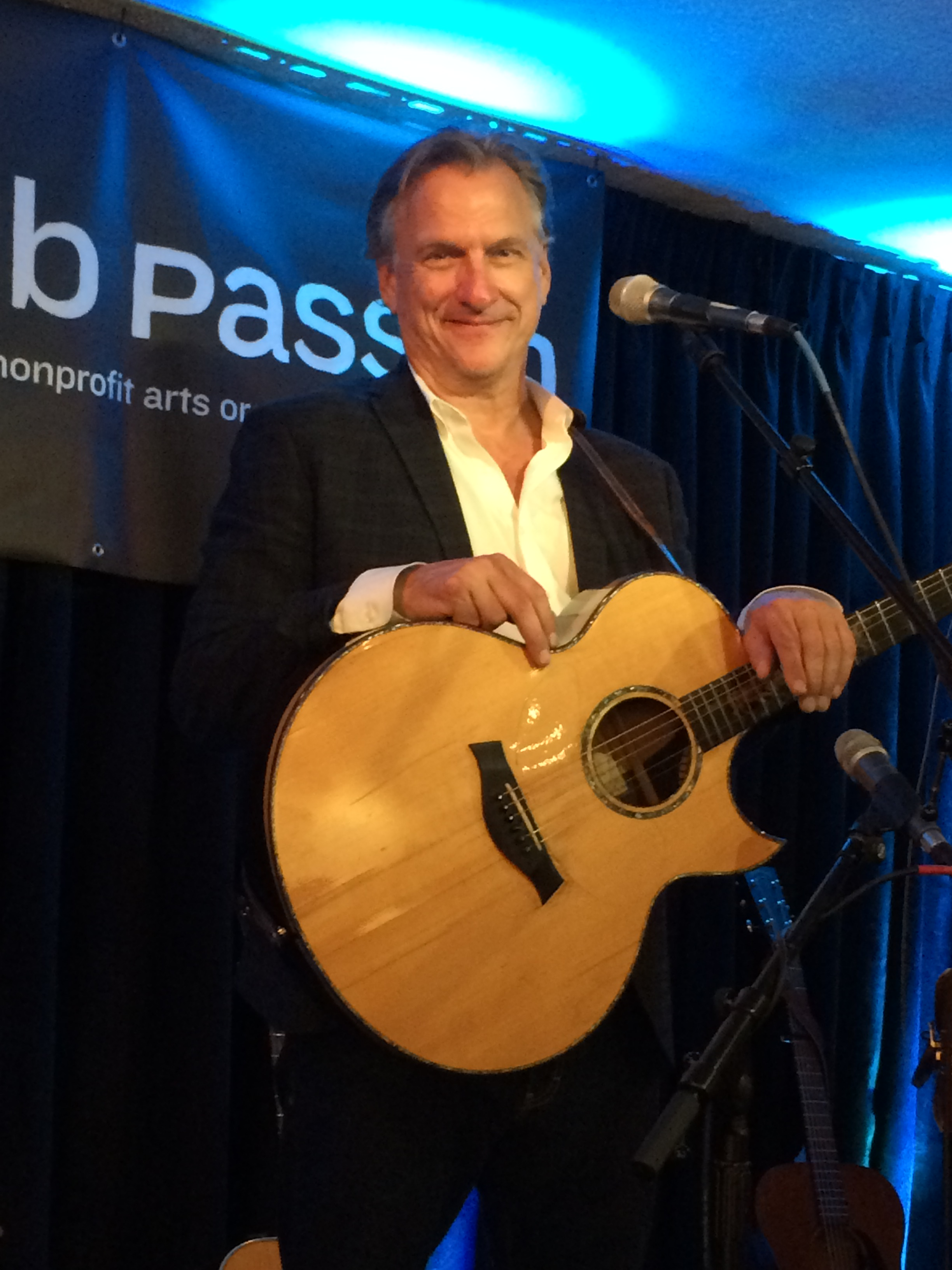
- Paul celebrating 30 Years of playing at Passim; Club, Passim; October 17, 2019

Background information
- Born: Paul Plissey; January 14, 1965 (age 61); Fort Kent, Maine, U.S.
- Origin: Boston, Massachusetts, U.S.
- Genres: Folk-pop; folk rock
- Occupation: Singer-songwriter
- Instruments: Vocals, guitar, piano, keyboards
- Years active: 1987–present
- Label: Rounder
- Website: ellispaul.com

Ellis Paul (born Paul Plissey; January 14, 1965) is an American singer-songwriter and folk musician. Born in Presque Isle, Aroostook County, Maine, Paul is a key figure in what has become known as the Boston school of songwriting, a literate, provocative, and urbanely romantic folk-pop style that helped ignite the folk revival of the 1990s. His pop music songs have appeared in movies and on television, bridging the gap between the modern folk sound and the populist traditions of Woody Guthrie and Pete Seeger.

Paul grew up in a small Maine town. He attended Boston College on a track scholarship, majoring in English. Injured during his junior year, Paul began playing guitar to help fill his free time and soon began writing songs. After graduating college Paul played at open mic nights in the Boston area while working with inner-city school children. He won a Boston Acoustic Underground songwriter competition and gained national exposure on a Windham Hill Records compilation which helped him choose music as a career.

Paul had released 19 albums by the end of 2014 and received 14 Boston Music Awards, considered the pinnacle of contemporary acoustic music success by some. He has published a book of original lyrics, poems, and drawings and released a DVD that includes a live performance, guitar instruction, and a road-trip documentary. In 2014, his children's CD Hero in You was published as a book by Albert Whitman & Company. Paul plays almost 200 live shows a year.

== Early life ==
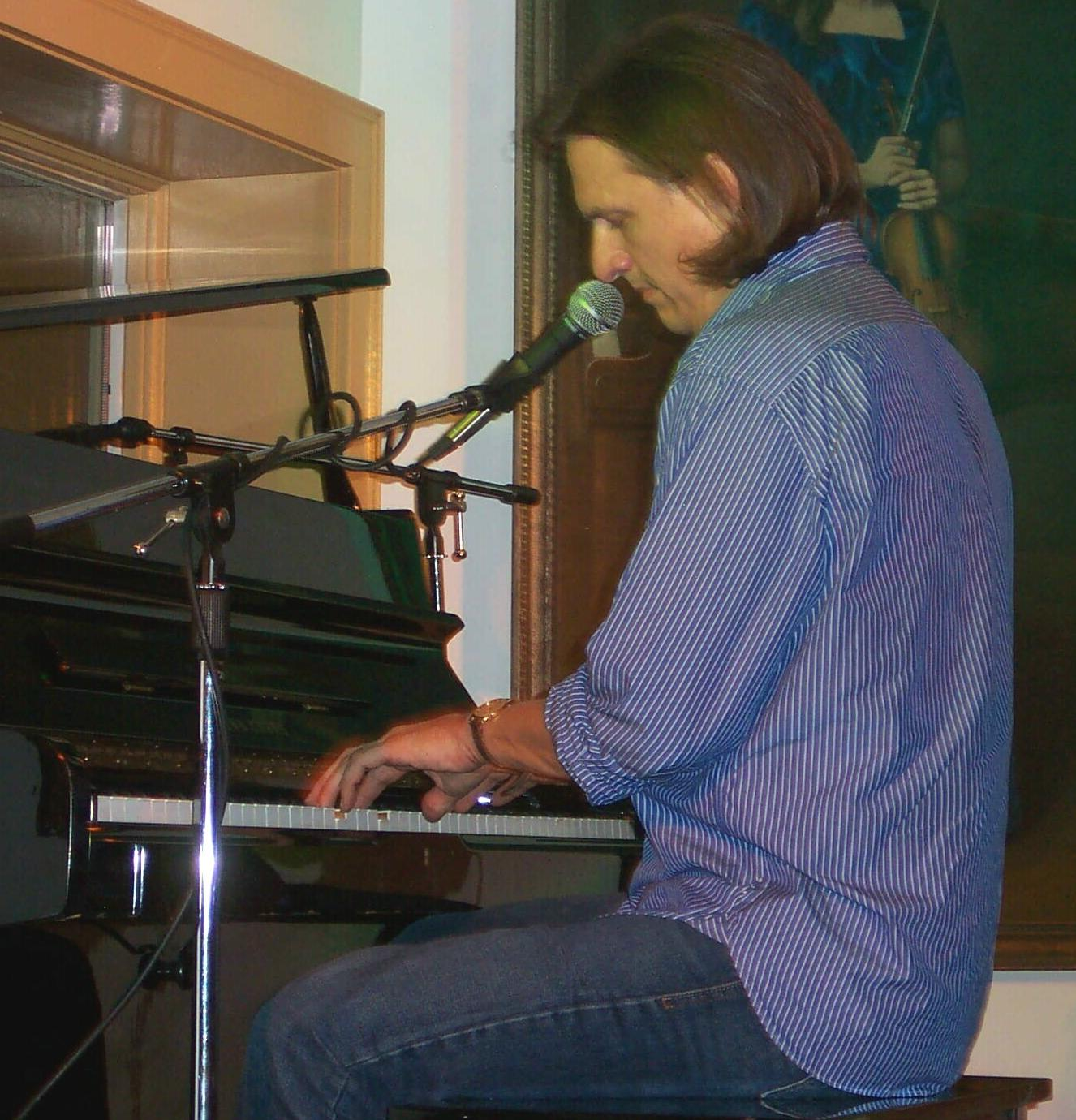
Paul performing "Home" on piano in Ogunquit, Maine, the state in which he grew up. (August 5, 2006)

Ellis Paul was born in Fort Kent, Maine, a small, rural potato-farming town near the Canada–US border. Paul's family had strong connections to the potato industry – his father, Ed Plissey, was Executive Director of the Maine Potato Commission and his grandfather owned a 140-acre (0.57 km^{2}) potato farm. Schools in the area closed for three weeks each year so that school children could help with the potato harvest. Paul spent many hours working on his grandfather's farm. Paul's mother, the former Marilyn Bonney of Buckfield, Maine, is a University of Maine graduate and was an extension agent for northern Aroostook County. She and her husband often worked together on special projects for the service. In the 1960s, Mrs. Plissey produced her own television show "The Aroostook Homemaker" which aired every third week on Presque Isle television station WAGM-TV.

While attending high school in Presque Isle, Maine, Paul listened to Top-40 radio and participated in track. He played trumpet in the school's stage band where he was introduced to the big band jazz music of Stan Kenton and Maynard Ferguson. He excelled in track, becoming the Maine State champion in five-kilometer distance running, a feat that garnered several scholarship offers, including an offer from Boston College. Having graduated high school with the class of 1983, Paul relocated to Boston, leaving small-town rural life behind. In an interview with Daniel Gewertz of the Boston Herald Paul stated, "It wasn't until I went to Boston College on a track scholarship that I first heard folk." Paul was particularly moved when he heard Bob Dylan singing "The House of the Rising Sun". It was then that he began to take folk music seriously.

Paul was inducted into the Presque Isle High School Athletic Hall of Fame (under his birth name, Paul Plissey) on January 11, 2013.

== Career ==
=== Early career: 1987–1990 ===
Paul majored in English at Boston College where he continued to participate in track. His best time in the 10,000 meters (30:18:50) remains the fourth best men's outdoor record in Boston College history. When a knee injury in his junior year sidelined him from athletics, Paul picked up an acoustic guitar to pass the time. He taught himself to play guitar with the help of a Hits of the 70s songbook, and began to write songs. Boston radio included a classic hits station that played the music of Bob Dylan, Joni Mitchell, Neil Young and James Taylor; artists who were mostly unfamiliar to Paul. Within a few years they became major influences. Having a career in music was the furthest thing from Paul's mind at that point, but as his playing and writing improved it became a bigger focus in his life. In an interview with FolkWax journalist Arthur Wood, Paul stated:

"I started playing and learned a few songs by other writers to begin with. I started writing originals within a few months. My songs were pretty horrendous to begin with. They kept getting better and better. When I graduated, I started playing at open mics in bars in Boston. Eventually discovered that there were folk clubs where people were actually listening, and not drinking and carousing while you played. I got involved in that circuit. I think that's why I've become so lyric conscious — because of those listening rooms, where you really have to rely on words in those situations."

The open mic circuit in the Boston area included The Nameless Coffeehouse in Cambridge, Westborough's Old Vienna Kaffeehaus and the Naked City Coffeehouse in Allston. Paul became a regular face at those clubs along with other young folk musicians such as Shawn Colvin, Patty Griffin, Dar Williams and Vance Gilbert. In 1989 he won the Nameless Coffeehouse's New Songwriter Award. Paul played Cambridge's Club Passim, a venue that would become his "home" venue, for the first time when he opened for John Gorka in October 1989. Less than four years later he performed his first shows at Passim as a headliner. The three consecutive nights of shows took place on February 19–21, 1993.

It was at the Old Vienna that Paul met Jon Svetkey, Brian Doser and Jim Infantino, all struggling young local musicians. In 1989 the four young men formed a collective called "End Construction" and in 1990 released a compilation of songs titled Resume Speed: New Artist Compilation on the End Construction Productions label. The four songwriters each performed four of his own original songs on the CD release. The Resume Speed liner notes stated that End Construction Productions was a small independent production, promotion and recording company run by songwriters and musicians "hellbent on getting the good music out there." In the interview with Wood, Paul stated that the four songwriters started doing group shows together and collaborated on each other's material. Although he goes on to say that the collaboration "was a good thing" and that the four musicians learned a lot from each other, eventually the foursome "burned out on the competitiveness". The collaboration lasted three years.

Following his graduation from Boston College in 1987, Paul worked a day-job at the COMPASS school as a teacher and social worker with inner city school children performing at open mics three or four nights a week. It was not until the fall of 1992 that he quit his day-job to pursue music as a full-time career. During this period Paul met his manager, Ralph Jaccodine, and together they founded Black Wolf Records. In 1989 the label released Paul's first two albums of original material: Am I Home and Urban Folksongs and Paul began touring outside the Boston area. Although originally released on cassette, the two albums were re-released on CD in 2001.

=== Rising success: 1990–2000 ===
Winning the Boston Acoustic Underground Award in 1991 resulted in Paul playing to the largest crowd of his career to that point – 300. He continued to play in and around the New England area. Around this time, Windham Hill Records, which had previously released the Legacy songwriter compilation, put a call out to the music industry asking for songwriter submissions to be considered for the follow-up Legacy II compilation. After the Old Vienna Kaffeehaus sent one of Paul's tapes to Windham Hill, Paul's "Ashes to Dust" from Urban Folksongs was chosen to be on the compilation. In the interview with Wood, Paul stated that he felt very excited to be on the Windham Hill release because it served as a calling card that every DJ and folk promoter in the country would recognize. Legacy II was released in 1992 and included songs performed by Patty Larkin, Patty Griffin, Greg Brown, Cheryl Wheeler and several others. Legacy II was Paul's first national exposure.

After Paul opened for Bill Morrissey several times, Morrissey became one of Paul's earliest mentors. Morrissey introduced Paul to the traditional songwriting of Woody Guthrie and Mississippi John Hurt, as well as songwriters of the 60s, such as Randy Newman. In a 2001 interview with Scott Alarik, Morrissey said that Paul jumped into listening to traditional songwriters "bigtime" and as a result is a much better writer and performer.

Paul asked Morrissey to produce his first album Say Something, which was released in 1993 on Black Wolf records. Fiddler Johnny Cunningham and guitarist Duke Levine, both friends of Morrissey's, can be heard on the recording along with the background vocals of Patty Griffin. Scott Alarik wrote: "As his lovely, demanding and brilliant debut album Say Something attests, there is a precocious credibility and emotional truth to his real-life ballads."

Levine would co-produce Paul's follow-up release Stories, which was released on Black Wolf in 1994 and re-released on Rounder Records the following year. It was also in 1994 that Paul was first invited to play the Kerrville Folk Festival, winning the Kerrville New Folk award.

Paul became a follower of the music of Woody Guthrie during the early 1990s. In a 1998 Boston Globe article, Paul refers to a tattoo of Woody Guthrie on his right shoulder saying that Woody's image was the only thing he could put on his body that would be "like a badge of who he was." Paul's tattoo of Woody Guthrie resulted in a chance meeting with Nora Guthrie, Woody Guthrie's daughter, at a Folk Alliance Conference when Nora asked to see Paul's tattoo. That chance meeting resulted in Paul being invited to perform at a Woody Guthrie tribute show at the Rock and Roll Hall of Fame in Cleveland, Ohio. The 10-day celebration, held in September 1996, included other notable musicians such as Bruce Springsteen, Billy Bragg, The Indigo Girls and Ani DiFranco. DiFranco's record label, Righteous Babe, released a compilation of the event, 'Til We Outnumber 'Em, in 2000.

Jerry Marotta, a drummer who had worked with Peter Gabriel, produced Paul's third CD release A Carnival of Voices which was released on Rounder in 1996. Marotta brought in bassist Tony Levin, guitarist Bill Dillon, and once again Duke Levine. Paul stated that A Carnival of Voices comprised character sketches of different people in different towns tied to "the carnival mentality of traveling." A Carnival of Voices hit No. 3 on The CMJ New Music Report Triple chart and World Cafe voted it the No. 1 album of the year. By 1997 Paul's mailing list passed 7,000 names as his fan-base continued to grow.

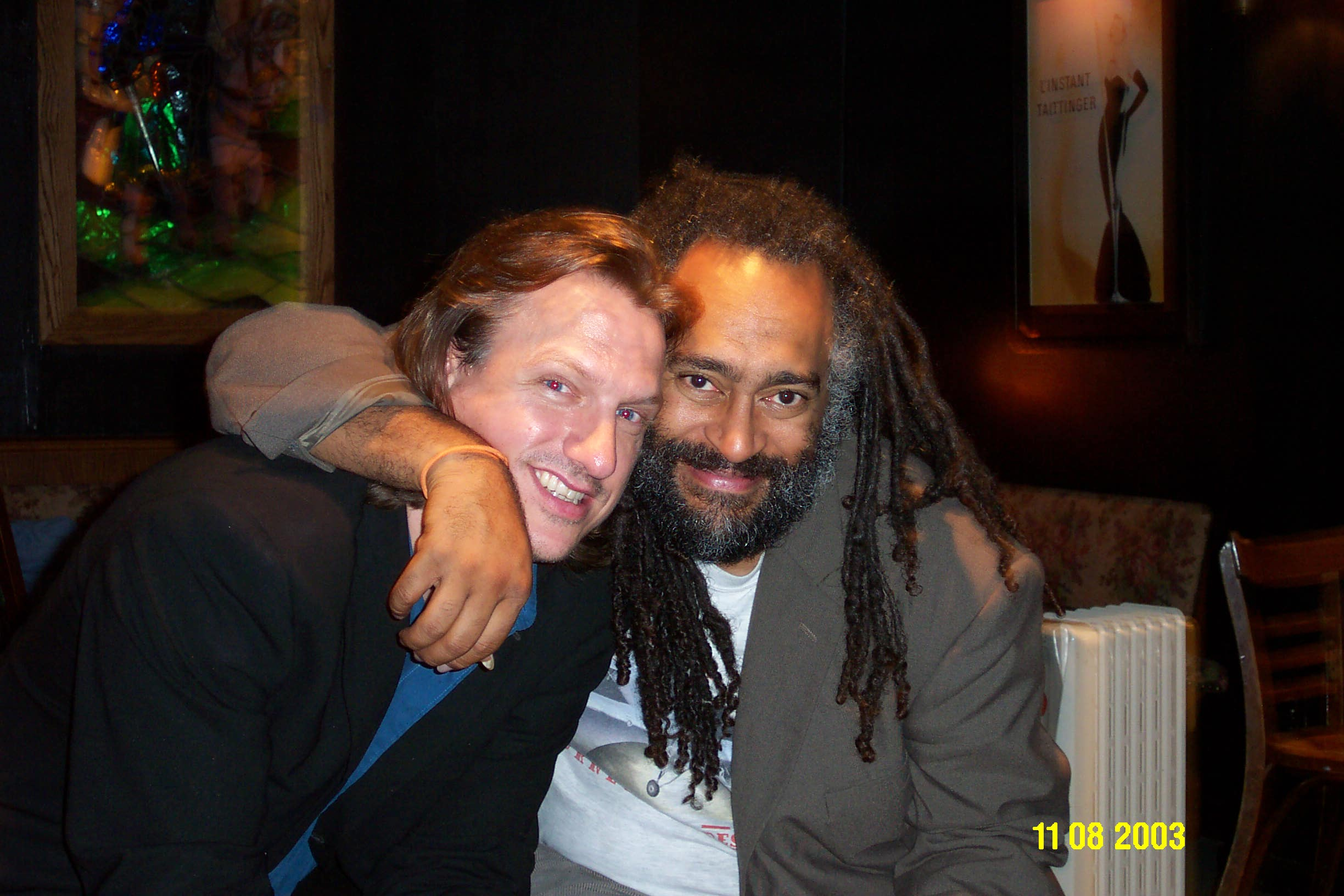
Paul (left) with good friend and fellow musician Vance Gilbert in Houston, Texas. (November 8, 2003) Paul's title track from Translucent Soul speaks of their friendship and deals with the issue of racism.

As Paul's reputation and popularity grew, he was asked to return to folk venues and festivals around the country including the Falcon Ridge Folk Festival, the Kerrville Folk Festival and the Newport Folk Festival. The number of shows he performed annually increased to more than 200. Although Paul performed mostly self-penned songs, he would often include a Woody Guthrie song into his set. Woody's "Hard Travelin'" was always a crowd pleaser, especially in Oklahoma, Woody's birthplace. In July 1998, the 1st Woody Guthrie Folk Festival was held in Woody's hometown of Okemah, Oklahoma. Not only did Paul headline the festival along with Billy Bragg, but the city of Okemah made him an honorary citizen. Paul stated that when he made the pilgrimage to Okemah he felt that he was walking in Woody's footsteps and that the experience was "like going to the mount". Paul's sixth CD, Translucent Soul, was released later that year in October. Again produced by Jerry Marotta, the title track is a song about his relationship with good friend Vance Gilbert and tackles the issue of racism.

At the end of the decade, Paul was invited to perform at Club Passim's 40th anniversary show. The event took place on January 16, 1999, at the Sanders Theater in Cambridge. The four-hour sold-out concert also included Patty Larkin, Joan Baez, The Nields, and others. Joan Anderman, covering the event for the Boston Globe, reported that Paul's "thinking-person's poetry" at the Sanders theater was "embellished with the bite of an electric guitarist and the earthy cool of a percussionist", and that his set was "a model of modern organic grace".

=== 2000–2003 ===
"The World Ain't Slowing Down"
Sample of Ellis Paul's "The World Ain't Slowing Down", originally recorded for Translucent Soul and included as the romantic theme in the 2000 comedy film Me, Myself and Irene.

Paul released his first live recording, simply titled Live, on March 14, 2000. The double-disk included recordings from several shows, as well as previously unreleased studio tracks. Highlights of the year 2000 included Paul singing the National Anthem at Fenway Park, and having his song "The World Ain't Slowing Down" chosen for the theme song in the Farrelly brothers movie Me, Myself and Irene starring Jim Carrey and Renée Zellweger. Both events took place on the same June weekend. In November 2001, Paul was again successful in having a song in a movie when "Sweet Mistakes" was featured in Shallow Hal starring Gwyneth Paltrow and Jack Black. Paul released his 8th CD, Sweet Mistakes, a collection of audience-favorites not yet recorded, on November 15, 2001. In January 2002, Paul was named the FolkWax Artist of the Year for 2001.

"The Millennium Poem"
Sample of Ellis Paul reciting "The Millennium Poem", an example of his spoken-word poetry often heard during live performances.

Paul often recites original poetry for his audiences. Some of those poems can be found in Notes from the Road, a collection of Paul's original poems, lyrics, and journal entries published by Black Wolf Press in May 2002. In her review for Performing Songwriter, Abby White said, "The book has an intimate, conversational tone, and Paul's childlike drawings, song lyrics and poetry provide commercial breaks to his personal journal entries and vivid recollections of significant events he encounters while touring". As the 21st century began Paul recited his "Millennium Poem", regularly at shows.

In 2002 Paul became friends with Nora Guthrie. Nora Guthrie is executive director of the Woody Guthrie Foundation and Archives in New York City where hundreds of Woody Guthrie's handwritten lyrics – many without music – are housed. She invited Paul to visit the Archives and choose one set of lyrics to put to song. Referring to the huge undertaking of finding songwriters to write music for hundreds of her father's lyrics, Nora Guthrie stated that there was a "job description" that her father left behind that "Ellis took on". Paul chose "God's Promise", lyrics that Woody had adapted in 1955 from "What God Hath Promised", a hymn of the day and recorded it for his 2002 release Speed of Trees. Paul said that visiting the Woody Guthrie Archives was like going through a time capsule of his biggest hero and that the posthumous collaboration with Woody Guthrie was one of the "coolest things" he'd ever done. The November 6, 2002 episode of the TV series Ed featured Paul's "If You Break Down".

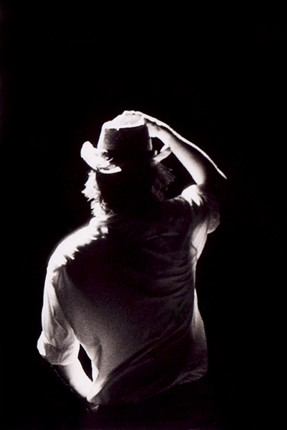
Paul performing at the 2002 Woody Guthrie Festival – July 11, 2002. Paul has performed at many events in Guthrie's honor and often incorporates Guthrie's songs into his sets.

Paul's connection to Woody Guthrie continued into 2003 when he was invited to perform in the Ribbon of Highway, Endless Skyway tribute show to honor Woody Guthrie. The ensemble show, which was the brainchild of Texas singer-songwriter Jimmy Lafave, toured around the country and included a rotating cast of singer-songwriters individually performing Guthrie's songs. Interspersed between songs were Guthrie's philosophical writings read by a narrator. In addition to LaFave and Paul, members of the rotating cast included Slaid Cleaves, Eliza Gilkyson, Joel Rafael, husband-wife duo Sarah Lee Guthrie (Woody Guthrie's granddaughter) and Johnny Irion, Michael Fracasso, and The Burns Sisters. Oklahoma songwriter Bob Childers, sometimes called "the Dylan of the Dust," served as narrator. When word spread about the tour, performers began contacting LaFave whose only prerequisite was to have an inspirational connection to Guthrie. Each artist chose the Guthrie songs that he or she would perform as part of the tribute. One of the songs Gilkyson chose was "Pastures of Plenty", while Cleaves chose "This Morning I Am Born Again" – a song he wrote using Guthrie's lyrics. One of the songs Paul chose was a song he wrote using Guthrie's lyrics – "God's Promise". LaFave said, "It works because all the performers are Guthrie enthusiasts in some form". The Ribbon of Highway tour kicked off on February 5, 2003, at the Ryman Auditorium in Nashville. The abbreviated show was a featured segment of "Nashville Sings Woody", yet another tribute concert to commemorate the music of Woody Guthrie held during the Folk Alliance Conference. The cast of "Nashville Sings Woody", a benefit for the Woody Guthrie Foundation and Archives, also included Arlo Guthrie, Marty Stuart, Nanci Griffith, Guy Clark, Ramblin' Jack Elliott, Janis Ian, and others.

Paul's 3000 Miles DVD was released in February 2003. Divided into four segments, the DVD begins with a live show recorded on October 3, 2001, at Boston's Somerville Theater – a show that was the final date of a six-week tour with Susan Werner. The second segment is a 39-minute road movie filmed in 1995 by Matt Linde, an independent filmmaker who accompanied Paul on a cross-country tour. Individual vignettes chronicle shows, conversations and events in Paul's daily life as a traveling musician. A third segment shows Paul demonstrating the open tunings he uses in many of his songs, while the final segment is a discussion of songwriting with fellow songwriters Christopher Williams and Vance Gilbert. In her review for Dirty Linen, Annette C. Eshleman said, "In just under three hours, viewers are able to watch as Paul evolves from a young, inexperienced folk singer wearing a backwards baseball cap to the highly respected, confident, seasoned performer that he is today".

=== 2004–2009 ===
On May 1, 2004, Paul was the recipient of the 2nd annual Boston College Arts Council Alumni Award for Artistic Achievement. The award was presented as part of the sixth annual Boston College Arts Festival. His appearances at the festival also included an "Inside the BC Studio" interview with music writer Scott Alarik, a master class on songwriting, and a concert. In 2004 Paul was also awarded his 13th Boston Music Award in the category of Outstanding Singer-Songwriter. At the time Paul was writing what he called "country tunes" when he teamed up with an Irish musician, producer, and studio expert named Flynn. This resulted in American Jukebox Fables, released April 5, 2005, a recording produced by Flynn that surprised some fans by melding folk, pop and electronica. Paul said that his collaboration with Flynn formed a partnership where he brought banjos and accordions and Flynn brought a laptop and keyboard. Although Paul knew that the end result would fall outside the comfort zone of some fans who expected another acoustic folk album, experimenting with Flynn's musical chemistry set injected excitement and fun into the recording project.

Since approximately 1995 (no one seems to know for certain), Paul has annually played Club Passim over New Year's, performing two shows on December 30 and two shows on New Year's Eve. In early 2006 Black Wolf Records released Live at Club Passim, a recording compiled from Paul's 2005 New Year's Eve shows. In May 2006, Paul toured Europe and England playing to sold-out shows in Paris, France; Twickenham, England; Cheltenham, England and Wasserburg, Germany. The tour also included two BBC radio interviews and a radio interview in Paris. Paul was included on the Woody Guthrie Coalition's DVD Woody Sez: a Tribute to Woody Guthrie released in 2006. The tribute show, recorded July 13, 2005, at the Crystal Theater in Okemah, Oklahoma, included Paul performing a duet with The Burns Sisters on "God's Promise". Also released in 2006 was Paul's "best of" album, released as Ellis Paul Essentials, on October 10. The two-disk retrospective of Paul's 15-year career contained some songs that were absolutes and others that were included based on polls held on his website and discussion board. In his Folkwax review of Ellis Paul Essentials, Arthur Wood stated: "If you've never visited "musically" with Mr. Ellis Paul, Essentials is a stunning place to start." In his review for The Washington Post, Mike Joyce said " Essentials, a career-spanning double CD from veteran singer-songwriter Ellis Paul, has a few newly produced, John Jennings-helmed tracks of previously recorded tunes that help set this compilation apart from most retrospectives." In her review for Sing Out!, Kari Estren said "Paul's Essentials is just that and a must for your folk collection."

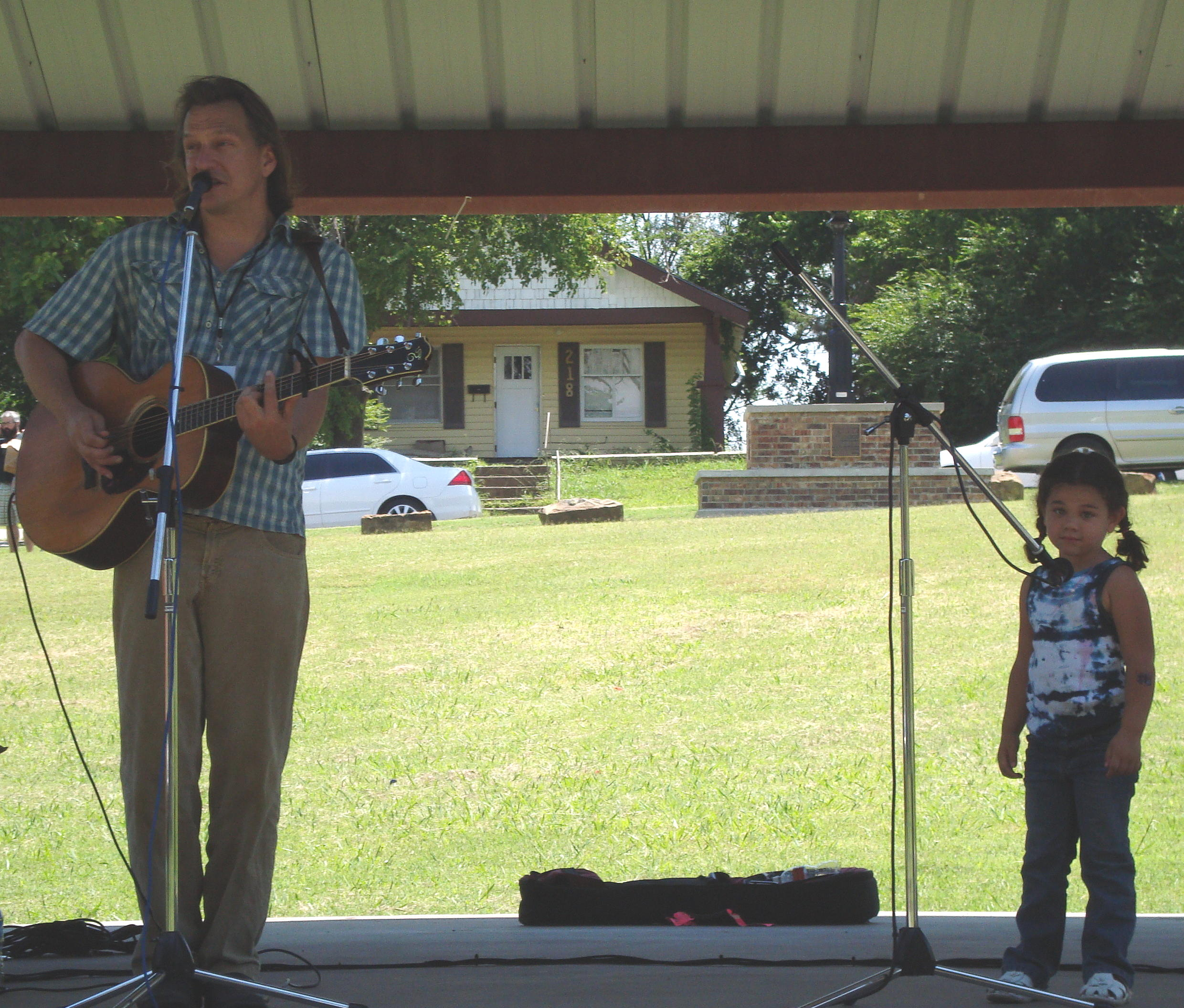
Paul is joined on stage by a young fan while performing at the Children's Festival at the 2008 Woody Guthrie Folk Festival – July 12, 2008.

In January 2008, Paul released a children's and family record entitled The Dragonfly Races. Inspired after the birth of his second daughter, Paul said that he wanted to teach his children about the world through the use of music. The songs are meant to be enjoyed by both children and adults, and Paul said "I wanted my kids to hear music with social commentary and some fantasy involved." Scott Alarik said "Paul sings movingly about what really worries new parents, and turns lazy dragonflies, gentle monsters, and resilient roses into useful metaphors for world peace, the power of faith, and the delights of a sleepy day." In April 2008 the Parents' Choice Foundation awarded The Dragonfly Races a Silver Medallion. The Parents' Choice Awards program honors the best material for children in these categories: books, toys, music and storytelling, magazines, software, videogames, television and websites.

In 2009, country musician Jack Ingram chose to record a song written by Paul. According to CMT, Paul's "The World Ain't Slowing Down", may be the song that takes Ingram to the "next level". Ingram says "It'll be fun for me to expose people to a fantastic song from an artist who's had a 20-year career of being a very successful folk artist."

=== 2010–2014 ===
Paul's sixteenth CD, The Day After Everything Changed, was released on January 12, 2010. Rather than work with a record label, Paul invited fans to help finance the recording by offering donors various premiums determined by the level of donation. Although Paul wasn't sure what to expect when the United States economy collapsed, the fan-funding initiative resulted in more than $100,000 being collected – more, according to Paul, – than any label had ever spent on him. Recorded in Nashville with a guest appearance by Kristian Bush that includes a duet on the track, "Paper Dolls", Paul says the fan support inspired him to make "the best record I could". One reviewer wrote: "This is such a tuneful, beautifully drawn set of songs played and sung with authority that it reminds you how much we need storytellers back in pop music—storytellers with empathy, fine eyes and an understanding that even though we live in a soulless, indifferent world our music doesn't have to reflect our culture." In her review for the Folk and Acoustic Music Exchange, Roberta Schwartz said that the CD is "a masterwork filled with the best music and lyrics of his career."

Five concerts commemorating Paul's 20th anniversary in the music business took place at Boston's Club Passim the weekend of July 9–10, 2010. Paul performed his eight solo albums in chronological order over four shows. In addition, he also performed a children's concert. The Mayor of Boston, Thomas M. Menino, proclaimed July 9, 2010, as Ellis Paul Day in the City of Boston.

WUMB announced that its listeners voted The Day After Everything Changed one of the Top 10 CDs of 2010.

Paul's second children's album, The Hero in You, was released on January 1, 2012. The songs on the album are all written about persons who Paul considers to be American heroes including Benjamin Franklin, Thomas Edison, Georgia O'Keeffe, and Rosa Parks. The album is Paul's attempt to teach children about some of America's most famous heroes. "I was a big fan of Schoolhouse Rock in the 70s. There was always a really great charm about the music. The main reason I can still remember the Preamble of the Constitution is because of those little songs", Paul said. The illustrations in the accompanying lyrics booklet were all created by Paul.

In a review for the Folk and Acoustic Music Exchange, Roberta Schwartz said that The Hero in You contains some of the best melodies and most moving lyrics of Paul's career. She goes on to cite "Chief Joseph" as an example – a song that incorporates one of the most famous quotes in Native American history: "I will fight no more forever".

The Hero in You received a Gold Medal from the Parents' Choice Foundation.

Paul's first Christmas album, City of Silver Dreams, was released on December 1, 2012. Produced by Flynn, the album consists of nine original songs – several co-written with Kristian Bush – and one cover song, the classic "Have Yourself a Very Merry Christmas" written by Hugh Martin and Ralph Blane. In her review for No Depression, Holley Dey wrote: "It's a collection with multifaceted personality, offering both melodic romanticism and a folk styled humor that twinkles with good natured fun."

On July 12, 2014, Paul was one of four performers inducted into the Maine Music Awards Hall of Fame. The awards ceremony took place in the Portland (Maine) Civic Center. Paul performed along with other members of the inaugural class which included Don McLean, Howie Day, and David Mallett.

Paul's 19th and second fan-funded album, Chasing Beauty, was released on September 9, 2014. The 14-track CD was produced by Kristian Bush (Sugarland) and Brandon Bush (Train) and recorded primarily in Decatur, Georgia. Paul is supported by Kristian Bush (acoustic/electric guitar, mandolin, banjo, bass), Brandon Bush (keyboards), Sugarland's Travis McNabb (drums), Gray Griggs (bass), Megan Lovell (lap steel), Tim Smith (bass), Ben Torres (trombone), Michael Snell (trumpet) and Brandyn Taylor (baritone sax). Rebecca Loebe and Red Molly make guest appearances.

=== 2015–present ===
Paul was invited to present the keynote address at the 2015 NERFA (Northeast Regional Folk Alliance) conference held Nov. 12–15, 2015 at the Hudson Valley Resort in Kerhonkson, New York. The 26-minute address presented on November 13, 2015, was later published on his website and on YouTube.

In late 2015, an announcement was made that Paul's song "Nelly Bly" from the album Hero in You would appear in the movie 10 Days in a Madhouse being released in the fall of 2015.

In April 2019 Ellis Paul announced that his new album The Storyteller's Suitcase would be released May 31, 2019, and released the first video from the album, for "I Ain't No Jesus." The Storyteller's Suitcase was named Album of the Year at the 2019 NERFA (Northeast Regional Folk Alliance) Conference held in Stamford, CT. Nov. 7–10, 2019.

In early 2020, the International Acoustic Music Awards (IAMA) announced that Paul's "I Ain't No Jesus" from The Storyteller's Suitcase was named Best Folk/Americana/Roots song as well as Overall Grand Prize Winner at the 16th Annual Awards.

== Collaborations ==
In 2000 Paul contributed backing vocals to Dave Nachmanoff's "A Certain Distance".

In September 2003 Paul released Side of the Road, a duo album recorded with good friend Vance Gilbert. The two songwriters, who have often shared the stage, each chose four cover songs to record – individual favorites – plus one song of their own. Although the album did not start out as a "9/11" project, the inclusion of Mark Erelli's "The Only Way" set a theme. A review in No Depression magazine said this about Paul and Gilbert's choice of songs:

"Thematically they're mostly about individuals — indeed, an entire planet — in desperate need of healing. To that end, Paul's original tune "Citizen of the World" is a wonderful balm, as he and Gilbert trade lyrics about the crossed bloodlines, attitudes and experiences that make us all brothers and sisters. Their version of Van Morrison's "Comfort You" works magic of a similar sort."

Sugarland's first holiday album, Gold and Green released on October 13, 2009 includes "City of Silver Dreams" and "Little Wood Guitar", co-written by Paul and Kristian Bush. In his review of the album, Matt Bjorke wrote, "City of Silver Dreams" could actually find itself a seminal holiday song like Joni Mitchell's "River" as it tells a wonderfully soft and melodic story of New York City and the beauty of a new romance within the context of Christmas."

== Songwriting ==
"Boston-style" songwriting refers to the introspective and literate breed of singer-songwriter so prevalent in the modern folk music landscape. According to Paul, Boston-style songwriting grew out of Boston's thriving folk scene with its dense collection of colleges, college radio stations and listening rooms. Boston radio includes the University of Massachusetts' WUMB, the country's foremost radio station for folk and acoustic music 24-hours a day. Paul said the Boston songwriters tend to be more thoughtful and soft because in an intimate listening room, "all you've got is you and your words." Boston-style songwriting tends to be more about lyric than melody, is intimate and thoughtful but also relevant, often addressing social issues. Boston-style songwriting does not only refer to Boston musicians, but includes national artists such as Shawn Colvin, John Gorka, Susan Werner, Bill Morrissey, and Dar Williams. In an interview with Paul Freeman for the East Bay Daily News, Paul commented on how he hopes audience members relate to his songs, "Each song is supposed to be like a little three-dimensional world. I'm hoping to invite them in, have them make out the details and the reasons for being there, and apply them to their own lives. But I'm also hoping to entertain them."

After graduating from Boston College, Paul worked as a case worker at an inner city school in the Jamaica Plain section of Boston, working with children with behavioral problems and also worked as a social worker in Boston with clients who were drug dealers, rapists, and other kinds of criminal offenders. His work experiences opened his eyes to see the world in a broader, more open-minded way and provided material for the songs he was beginning to write. Early in his career Paul promised himself that he would always write about the things he knew well. In her review of Ellis Paul Live for the Folk and Music Exchange, Roberta Schwartz said, "His finely honed songs tell stories filled with images that sparkle like jewels. His is a poet's heart, and a romantic's soul. He is an optimist who believes in people and possibilities."

"Conversation With a Ghost"
Sample of Ellis Paul's "Conversation With a Ghost" from Say Something, an example of his distinctive lyrical style, described by reviewers as using a minimum of words to tell a story effectively whilst avoiding cliché.

In her 1993 review of Paul's Say Something, Debbie Catalano wrote, "Ellis Paul draws a picture with his words then draws you into the world he's painting." Like a Norman Rockwell painting, Paul's songs are replete with crucial details and careful observations that tell a story with a minimum or words. In a 2002 article, Thomas Conner dissected a verse from Paul's "Conversation with a Ghost" from Say Something. "Instead of bluntly saying, "I ran into an old flame in Central Park", Paul writes around it, avoiding the clichés, painting the picture, showing us everything—the motives, the setting, the serendipity—except what we expect."

When teaching songwriting classes, Paul often introduces aspiring songwriters to his "six-step program to effective songwriting" which is based on the premise that songwriters should show and not tell. Paul teaches this six-step method to develop a character in a song:

1. Choose a name for the person.
2. List five items in the person's bedroom.
3. List five things the person would see if he or she looked in a mirror.
4. Choose two colors that bring the person to mind.
5. Choose one non-human metaphor describing the person.
6. Write one line of dialogue that conveys the way the person speaks.

The most important advice he gives aspiring songwriters is to write what you know or what you've experienced. "Use reality as the springboard to whatever you're writing about", Paul said. Paul also says that being a successful songwriter is like being a journalist who writes about what he sees and knows, the times people are living in and the things people are facing today. "The journalist looks out the window and writes about what is really happening." "I make sure it's real. I don't want to fictionalize about things I haven't witnessed." Paul states that over the years he's learned the value of simplicity in writing. He's learned that he can say more when he writes more simply and direct. "It's almost as if you can be complex and intricate by adopting a shorter, less complicated structure." "I'm not doing rocket science – I'm a storyteller", he said. "I hope to inspire people to think and feel and to walk out with more than they came in with."

When asked to describe the difference between writing songs for children and song for adults, Paul said: "The difference between writing a kids' song and an adult song is that in the kids' songs you tend to use primary colors and the words are brighter and the tempos are always upbeat. There's a nuance to the adult songs that is different. It's still the story telling, but its different shades and angles. You read between the lines more."

Paul continues playing close to 200 dates annually on the folk circuit. His songs have appeared on more than 50 compilation CDs, and he has made nearly 40 guest appearances on the albums of artists including Lori McKenna, David Wilcox and Mark Erelli. When asked if he would rather play the 19,600-seat Fleet Theater or the 900-seat Somerville Theater – both in Boston, Paul replied, "I prefer to keep it intimate. That way people can see the whites of your eyes. I'd love to write a hit song and have it on the radio like "American Pie" or something, but I'm just gonna do what I do and take what I can and run with it, because it's a hard business to have even what I have. So I don't have pie-in-the-sky Springsteen-esque hopes. I just want to write great songs."

In a review for the Folk and Acoustic Music Exchange, Roberta Schwartz said, "Ellis Paul is one of the best singer/songwriters of his generation. And for many of us he is the face of contemporary folk music—few are as smart, as literate and as poetic as Paul. He has spun his story songs for nearly twenty years now, and has eleven studio recordings (with an additional two early recordings on cassette—now available on CD) to his credit. I cannot think of another artist on the acoustic music scene who is better-loved by fans, or more respected by his contemporaries."

== Children's books ==
On September 1, 2014, Paul's children's CD Hero in You was published as a book by Albert Whitman & Company. Illustrated by Angela Padron, the book of American biographies includes a copy of the CD with exclusive introductory tracks by Paul. The accompanying CD allows young readers to listen to each song while discovering additional facts about Paul's heroes on each page.

Paul's second children's book was published – again by Albert Whitman & Company – in October 2015. Based on his Christmas poem The Night the Lights Went Out on Christmas, the book, illustrated by Scott Brundage, is the whimsical yet heartwarming story of a neighborhood where families trying to outdo one another with Christmas lights and decorations use so much electrical power that the neighborhood is thrown into darkness. The poem originally appeared on Paul's City of Silver Dreams Christmas CD and is included as a downloadable mp3 file with the book.

== Sports honor ==
In September 2012, Presque Isle High School announced that Paul would be one of four high school graduates inducted into its Athletic Hall of Fame at the third annual ceremony on January 11, 2013. During his high school career, Paul – a member of the class of 1983 – starred in cross-country and track. He won a cross-country state championship as a senior as well as three Eastern Maine titles and a 5,000-meter state crown in track. He also finished second in the 15–16 age division of the 1981 AAU national cross-country championships and later during his career placed seventh in the 17–18 age group at the AAU Junior Olympic national championships.

Coinciding with the Athletic Hall of Fame induction ceremony were two performances to benefit the Wintergreen Arts Center, one at The Whole Potato Cafe and Commons and one at the University of Maine at Presque Isle's Wieden Auditorium.

== University of Maine honor ==
On May 17, 2014, Paul was the commencement address speaker at the University of Maine at Presque Isle's 105th commencement. Paul was also awarded an honorary Doctor of Humane Letters degree during the commencement ceremony. At the conclusion of his commencement address, Paul performed his composition "Rise Up, Presque Isle" which has been adopted as the school's new Alma Mater.

== Discography ==
Year	Title	Record label
2023	55	Rosella
2020	Traveling Medicine Show: Volume 1	Rosella
2019	The Storyteller's Suitcase	Rosella
2014	Chasing Beauty	Black Wolf
2012	City of Silver Dreams	Black Wolf
2012	The Hero in You	Black Wolf
2010	The Day After Everything Changed	Black Wolf
2008	A Summer Night in Georgia – Live at Eddie's Attic	Black Wolf
2008	The Dragonfly Races	Black Wolf
2006	Essentials	Rounder
2005	Live at Club Passim	Black Wolf
2005	American Jukebox Fables	Rounder
2003	Side of the Road (with Vance Gilbert)	Rounder
2002	The Speed of Trees	Rounder
2001	Sweet Mistakes	Co-Op Pop
2000	Live	Rounder
1998	Translucent Soul	Rounder
1995	A Carnival of Voices	Rounder
1994	Stories	Black Wolf; re-released Rounder
1993	Say Something	Black Wolf
1989	Am I Home	Black Wolf
1989	Urban Folk Songs	Black Wolf

== Awards ==
Year	Association/Award	Category
2020	International Acoustic Music Awards (IAMA)	Overall Grand Prize Winner — "I Ain't No Jesus"
2020	International Acoustic Music Awards (IAMA)	Best Folk/Americana/Roots song — "I Ain't No Jesus"
2019	Northeast Regional Folk Alliance (NERFA)	Album of the Year — The Storyteller's Suitcase
2014	Maine Music Awards	Hall of Fame Inductee – inaugural class
2012	Parents' Choice Foundation	Gold Award — Hero in You
2009	Boston Music Awards	Folk Act of the Year
2008	Parents' Choice Foundation	Silver Award — The Dragonfly Races
2004	Boston Music Awards	Outstanding Male Singer-Songwriter
2004	Boston College Arts Council	Alumni Award for Artistic Achievement
2002	Boston Music Awards	Outstanding Singer-Songwriter Album — Sweet Mistakes
2001	Boston Music Awards	Outstanding Male Singer-Songwriter
1999	Boston Music Awards	Outstanding Male Vocalist – Indie Label
1999	Boston Music Awards	Outstanding Acoustic Folk Album — Translucent Soul
1999	Boston Music Awards	Outstanding Singer-Songwriter — "Take Me Down"
1997	Boston Music Awards	Outstanding Contemporary Folk Act
1996	Boston Music Awards	Outstanding Contemporary Folk Act
1995	Boston Music Awards	Folk/Acoustic Album of the Year — Stories
1995	Boston Music Awards	Outstanding Local Male Vocalist
1994	Kerrville Folk Festival	New Folk Competition Winner
1993	Boston Music Awards	Outstanding Song of the Year [Indie Label] — "Conversation With A Ghost"
1992	Boston Music Awards	Outstanding New Folk/Acoustic Act
1991	Boston Acoustic Underground	Winner

== Further reading/listening ==
=== Books ===
- 2003 – Kerouac, Jack. Doctor Sax and the Great World Snake, Mint Publishers, ISBN 0-9729733-0-3. (Screenplay recorded on two audio CDs with Ellis Paul as the voice of Lousy.)
- 2003 – Alarik, Scott. Deep Community: Adventures in the Modern Folk Underground, Boston: Black Wolf Press, ISBN 0-9720270-1-7. (Prominently features Ellis Paul.)
- 2002 – Paul, Ellis. Notes From the Road, Boston: Black Wolf Press, ISBN 0-9720270-0-9. (Paul's self-illustrated book of lyrics, poems and journal entries.)
- 2002 – Kubica, Chris and Hochman, Will. Letters to J.D. Salinger, University of Wisconsin Press, ISBN 0-299-17800-5. (Includes an entry written by Ellis Paul.)
- 2001 – Stambler, Irwin. Folk & Blues: The Encyclopedia: The Premier Encyclopedia Of American Roots Music, Thomas Dunne Books, ISBN 0-312-20057-9. (Includes an entry for Ellis Paul.)

=== Magazines ===
(See the Ellis Paul Archives for a more comprehensive listing.)

- 2006 – Perricone, Mike. gallery: ellis paul. Did Galileo Pray? Symmetry: Dimensions of Particle Physics, Jun/Jul 2006, p. 28–9. Retrieved February 10, 2007.
- 2005 – Soroff, Jonathan. Soroff on Ellis Paul. Improper Bostonian, Apr 6–19, 2005, p. 16.
- 2002 – Rutz, Kathy. New Release Spotlight: Ellis Paul. Performing Songwriter, Dec 2002, p. 26.
- 2000 – Weider, Tamara. Ellis Paul: On the road again. Improper Bostonian, June 14, 2000, p. 18–22.
- 1996 – Fagan, Neil. Artist spotlight: Ellis Paul. Performing Songwriter, Jan/Feb 1996, p. 30–1.

=== Miscellany ===
- 2011 – Never Not Funny: The Jimmy Pardo Podcast Video of Ellis Paul appearing on Never Not Funny hosted by Jimmy Pardo. February 2, 2011.
- 2007 – Studio Concert Series: Ellis Paul. Video interview/performance recorded at Blue Rock Studios in Wimberley, Texas.
  May 10, 2007.
- 2004 – "Inside the BC Studio: A Conversation with Ellis Paul". Video interview at Boston College with Scott Alarik as part of the Boston College Arts Council Alumni Award weekend festivities. April 30, 2004.
- 1999 – Ellis Paul on The Millennium Stage of the Kennedy Center Video performance in Washington, D.C.. June 22, 1999.
