= No Trespassing (EP) =

EP by the Roches
- Released: 1986
- Genre: Folk
- Length: 15:18
- Label: SOS; Rhino
- Producer: Joe Ferry, Andy Block, the Roches

The Roches chronology
Another World (1985)	No Trespassing (1986)	Crossing Delancey (1988)

No Trespassing is a 1986 EP by the American folk group the Roches. It was released in 1986 on SOS Records, and distributed more widely by Rhino Records.

== Production ==
The EP was produced by Joe Ferry, Andy Block, and the Roches. The trio recorded it after splitting from Warner Bros. Records; they claimed that it was the first time that they had total control in the studio.

== Critical reception ==
Professional ratings
Review scores
Source	Rating
AllMusic	2/5 stars
Robert Christgau	B-

The New York Times determined that "as usual with the Roches, [the EP] finds new things to say about love and its discontents—quietly but without flinching." The Los Angeles Times praised the "enticing, soft-rockish title song."

AllMusic wrote that "an alternately gleeful and wary romanticism empowers the whole set, as the Roches sisters' voices entwine as one, with novel harmonies adding cycles of tension and resolution."

== Track listing ==
1. "No Trespassing" – 4:47
2. "Knifed" – 1:54
3. "That Won't Happen" – 5:01
4. "La Vie C'est la Vie" – 2:44

== Credits ==
- Produced by Joe Ferry, Andy Bloch and the Roches
- Engineered by Andy Bloch
- Recorded at Acme Studios, Mamaroneck, N.Y.
- Digital remastering: Bill Inglot and Ken Perry / A&M Mastering
- Front and back cover design: Terre Roche & Rise Daniels
