= Songs from an Unmarried Housewife and Mother, Greenwich Village, USA =

Studio album by Suzzy Roche
- Released: 2000
- Genre: Folk
- Label: Red House
- Producer: Stewart Lerman, Suzzy Roche

Suzzy Roche chronology
Holy Smokes (1997)	Songs from an Unmarried Housewife and Mother, Greenwich Village, USA (2000)

Songs from an Unmarried Housewife and Mother, Greenwich Village, USA is the second album by Suzzy Roche, released in 2000.

== Production ==
The album was produced by Roche and Stewart Lerman, and contains appearances from Jules Shear and Loudon Wainwright III, among others.

== Critical reception ==
Professional ratings
Review scores
Source	Rating
AllMusic	4.5/5 stars
Courier-News	3/4 stars
The Encyclopedia of Popular Music	3/5 stars
The San Diego Union-Tribune	2.5/4 stars

AllMusic wrote that "producers Stewart Lerman and Roche have just the right touch with her heartfelt and strong folk music; it sings out rather than sits back sounding quaint -- no easy task for a voice as sweet and old-fashioned as Roche's." SF Weekly thought that "Roche sings out strong rather than getting played down in a creaky, back porch mix." The Morning Call called the album a "much brighter second solo record," writing that it "has a stardust shuffle, a bluegrass shuffle and a bundle of healthy romantic compromises."

== Track listing ==
1. "Yankee Doodle" – 1:16
2. "Looking for God" – 3:47
3. "G Chord Song" – 2:33
4. "Out of the Blue" – 3:04
5. "No Such Thing as Love" – 4:14
6. "Cold Hard Wind" – 2:47
7. "To Alaska with Love" – 4:01
8. "Love Comes to Town" – 3:22
9. "Goodbye Cruel World" – 3:35
10. "Suit and Tie" – 3:32
11. "Born Yesterday" – 2:56
12. "Sweetie Pie" – 3:29
