= Another World (The Roches album) =

Studio album by the Roches
- Released: 1985
- Length: 37:14
- Label: Warner Bros.
- Producer: Carter Cathcart, Edd Kalehoff, Howie Lindeman, Richard Gottehrer, the Roches

The Roches chronology
Keep On Doing (1982)	Another World (1985)	No Trespassing (1986)

Another World is the fourth studio album by the American musical trio the Roches, released in 1985 on Warner Bros. Records. The trio supported the album with a North American tour.

== Production ==
Richard Gottehrer was among the album's many producers. The trio added drum machines and synthesizers to their sound in part to appeal to radio, but primarily because they were interested in experimenting with the technology. They wrote 17 songs, choosing seven for the album. "Come Softly to Me" is a cover of the Fleetwoods' song. The Roches' brother, David, wrote "Missing".

== Critical reception ==
Professional ratings
Review scores
Source	Rating
AllMusic	3/5 stars
Robert Christgau	B+
Orlando Sentinel	3/5 stars
The Philadelphia Inquirer	3/4 stars

The New York Times wrote that, "instead of emphasizing individual quirks, the vocal arrangements on the new album favor a sweetly homogenized blend, and the instrumentation makes liberal use of drum machines and synthesizers." The Orlando Sentinel deemed the album "a flashy brand of pop-rock—the kind with bouncy arrangements and polished production."

== Track listing ==
1. "Love Radiates Around" (Mark Johnson) – 4:48
2. "Another World" (Maggie, Terre & Suzzy Roche) – 3:18
3. "Come Softly to Me" (Gary Troxel, Gretchen Christopher, Barbara Ellis) – 3:03
4. "Missing" (David Roche) – 4:01
5. "Face Down at Folk City" (Maggie, Terre & Suzzy Roche) – 4:06
6. "The Angry Angry Man" (Terre & Suzzy Roche) – 3:39
7. "Weeded Out" (Maggie, Terre & Suzzy Roche) – 3:48
8. "Older Girls" (Terre & Suzzy Roche) – 2:57
9. "Love to See You" (Suzzy Roche) – 4:18
10. "Gimme a Slice" (Maggie & Terre Roche) – 3:29

== Personnel ==
- Eluriel "Tinker" Barfield: bass guitar
- Gene Bianco: harp
- Carter Cathcart: drums, bass guitar, keyboards, electric guitars
- Francisco Centeno: bass guitar
- Sandy Humphrey: cookies
- Edd Kalehoff: synthesizers, keyboards, PP3
- Steve Love: electric guitar
- Roy Markowitz: drums
- Sammy Merendino: drums (Paiste cymbals)
- Maggie Roche: keyboards, singing
- Suzzy Roche: acoustic guitar, singing
- Terre Roche: electric and acoustic guitar, singing
- Andy Schwartz: electric guitar
- Lee Shapiro: synclavier
- Front cover photos: Lesley J. Avery
- Back cover photos: Clifford Fagin, Glen Zdon
- Art direction/design: Lesley J. Avery

"Love Radiates Around", "Missing", "The Angry Angry Man", "Love to See You" and "Gimme a Slice" mixed by Howard E. Lindeman at RPM Studio (thanks to Bob Mason). Assistant and additional engineering: Mike Krowiak

"Come Softly to Me", "Face Down at Folk City", "Weeded Out" and "Older Girls" mixed by Thom Panunzio at the Record Plant.

== Notes ==
- (1, 4, 6, 10) Produced by Edd Kalehoff and Howard Lindeman for Edd Kalehoff Productions. Engineer: Howard Lindeman. Recorded at Producers Recording Studio.
- (2) Produced by Carter Cathcart and the Roches. Engineer: Carter Cathcart. Recorded and Mixed at Wild Twin Recording Studio.
- (3, 5, 7, 8, 9) Produced by Richard Gottehrer. Engineer: Thom Panunzio. Assistant and additional engineering: His Majesty Tom Swift. Recorded at the Record Plant.
