= Holy Smokes (album) =

Studio album by Suzzy Roche
- Released: 1997
- Genres: Pop, folk
- Label: Red House
- Producers: Stewart Lerman, Suzzy Roche

Suzzy Roche chronology
Holy Smokes (1997)	Songs from an Unmarried Housewife and Mother, Greenwich Village, USA (2000)

Holy Smokes is the debut solo album by the American musician Suzzy Roche, released in 1997. It was the first solo album by a member of the Roches. Roche supported the album by embarking on a tour, playing solo with just a guitar.

== Production ==
The album was produced by Stewart Lerman and Roche. Roche wrote 11 of the album's 12 songs; the final track is based on poem written by her mother. The vocals were often multitracked, to reproduce the harmony sound of the Roches; Jules Shear and Maggie Roche also contributed vocals.

Roche spent close to two years working on Holy Smokes. The decision to make a solo album was inspired by a book of Irish poetry given to her by her late father.

== Critical reception ==
Professional ratings
Review scores
Source	Rating
AllMusic	3/5 stars
Entertainment Weekly	B+
MusicHound Folk: The Essential Album Guide	3/5 stars

The Washington Post wrote that the songs "occupy that broad middle ground of somewhat amusing, somewhat touching songs about the trials and joys of growing up a smart, middle-class American woman." Entertainment Weekly deemed the album "a deceptively placid-sounding solo effort whose surface calm belies its emotional turbulence." The Philadelphia Inquirer thought that "Roche's inherent ethereal charm belies the unrelieved heartbreak that colors much of Holy Smokes."

New York concluded that Roche's "lyric are more personal than the Roches', and her melodic sense is as vivid." The Chicago Tribune thought that "Roche sets one warm, folky melody after another amid cozy piano-acoustic guitar textures, creating a relaxed and intimate work."

AllMusic called the album "an oddly tentative premiere for such a seasoned performer, and not as much fun as it should have been."

== Track listing ==
1. "My My Broken Heart" – 3:31
2. "Crash" – 4:12
3. "Eggshell" – 3:24
4. "Holy Smokes" – 3:18
5. "Rules" – 3:39
6. "The Second Coming of Eli" – 3:17
7. "Losing" – 4:48
8. "Lightning Storm" – 3:18
9. "ABC's" – 3:27
10. "Pink Ballet Slippers" – 3:37
11. "Breathing" – 3:08
12. "Two Bumps on a Log" – 3:57
