= Suzzy Roche =

American singer (born 1956)

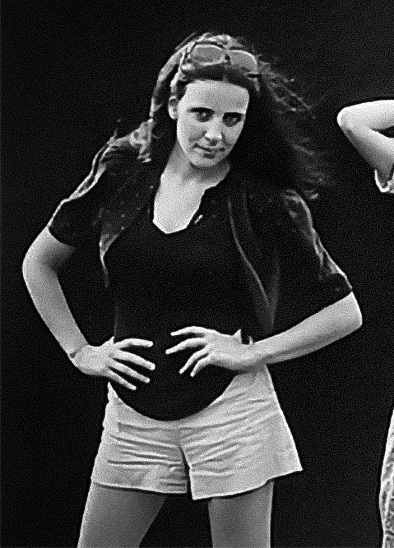
- Roche in a promotional photo for the Roches in 1980

Background information
- Born: September 29, 1956 (age 70); New Jersey, U.S.
- Genre: Folk rock
- Occupations: Singer, author, actress
- Years active: 1973–present
- Formerly of: The Roches

Suzzy Roche (/ˈsʌziː/ SUHZ-ee; born September 29, 1956) is an American singer, best known for her work with the vocal group the Roches, alongside sisters Maggie and Terre. Suzzy is the youngest of the three, and joined the act in 1977. She is the author of the novels Wayward Saints and The Town Crazy and the children's book Want to Be in a Band?

== Early life ==
Raised in Park Ridge, New Jersey, Suzzy began performing as a student at Park Ridge High School.

== Career ==
Roche is an active associate member of The Wooster Group and has appeared in a number of the group's productions as well as composing original music for the group's performances. She was briefly a member of Four Bitchin' Babes, appearing on their album Some Assembly Required. In 2004 Roche appeared on Crash Test Dummies album Songs of the Unforgiven.

In addition to singing, Roche has also acted in film and television. She appeared in the 1988 romantic comedy Crossing Delancey, the 1982 film Soup for One, and the 2016 short film The Law of Averages, where she plays the lead role of a conflicted mother in rural Quebec following the loss of her own mother. Roche also appeared with her siblings (playing themselves) in the 1996 comedy A Weekend in the Country.

== Personal life ==
With musician Loudon Wainwright III, Roche has a daughter: Lucy Wainwright Roche. Suzzy, Lucy and Loudon occasionally appear onstage together. Lucy's paternal half-siblings Rufus Wainwright and Martha Wainwright (Loudon Wainwright's children with his first wife, the singer-songwriter Kate McGarrigle) are also singer-songwriters.

== Filmography ==
=== Film ===
Year	Title	Role	Notes
1982	Soup for One	Girl #1	
1984	Almost You	Receptionist	
1988	Crossing Delancey	Marilyn Cohen	
1992	My New Gun	Checkout Girl	
1992	Me and Veronica	Bar Customer	
2015	A Gesture and a Word	—N/a	Documentary

=== Television ===
Year	Title	Role	Notes
1991	Tiny Toon Adventures	Suzzy	Episode: "New Character Day"
1994	The Adventures of Pete & Pete	Metermaid	Episode: "Inspector 34"
1996	A Weekend in the Country	Herself	Television film
1997	Tracey Takes On...	PA	Episode: "Music"

== Solo discography ==
- Holy Smokes (Red House, 1997)
- Songs from an Unmarried Housewife and Mother, Greenwich Village, USA (Red House, 2000)
