= GLAAD Media Award for Outstanding Music Artist =

Annual US media award

- Awarded for: Excellence in music by LGBTQ people or allies
- Venue: Varies
- Country: United States
- Presented by: GLAAD
- First award: 1991; 35 years ago
- 2026 winner: Young Miko; Do Not Disturb

The GLAAD Media Award for Outstanding Music Artist is an annual award that honors music artists who are either openly queer or allies and have used their music to increase acceptance of the LGBT (lesbian, gay, bisexual, and transgender) community. It is one of several categories of the annual GLAAD Media Awards, which are presented by GLAAD—an American non-governmental media monitoring organization—at ceremonies held primarily in New York City and Los Angeles between March and May.

GLAAD first recognized music at the 2nd GLAAD Media Awards in 1991, with Two Nice Girls winning an award. The following year, Phranc was recognized as Outstanding Recording Artist, while John Corigliano's "Symphony No. 1" won Outstanding Music Composition; the only instance this award was given. In 1993, Garth Brooks' "We Shall Be Free" won Outstanding Music Song, while Elton John's "The Last Song" won Outstanding Music Video. The 6th GLAAD Media Awards in 1996 marked the only instance where three music-related awards were given, with Outstanding Music Album being presented for the first time to Disappear Fear's self-titled album. Starting with the 11th GLAAD Media Awards in 2000, Outstanding Music Album was the sole music-related category recognized by GLAAD, with the award going to Indigo Girls' Come On Now Social. At the 15th GLAAD Media Awards in 2004, the category was retitled to its current name, with the award going to Rufus Wainwright for his album Want One. To date there has only been one tie, with Adam Lambert and Frank Ocean winning the award at the 24th GLAAD Media Awards in 2013 for Trespassing and Channel Orange, respectively.

For a music artist to be eligible, they must have released an album or extended play during the eligibility period, and have it be sold in a major record shop or digital music store. The artist must also use their music and live performances to "accelerate LGBTQ acceptance", with interviews and public statements also being taken into consideration. At one point, the award could only be given to artists that were openly LGBT, but this criterion was revised starting with the 30th GLAAD Media Awards in 2019 so that LGBT allies can also be eligible. Moreover, while the award was at one point given to openly queer artists regardless of whether their music included LGBT themes, in 2019 this was changed so that artists had to use their music to "accelerate LGBTQ acceptance".

With four wins out of six nominations, Rufus Wainwright is the most-awarded artist in this category, followed by Melissa Etheridge, who has three awards out of nine nominations. Scissor Sisters is the band with the most wins, having received three wins from four nominations. With five nominations, Brandi Carlile is the music artist that has been nominated the most often without a win. At the 37th GLAAD Media Awards in 2026, the award was given to Young Miko for her album Do Not Disturb.

== Winners and nominees ==
Table key
‡	Indicates the winner

=== 1990s ===
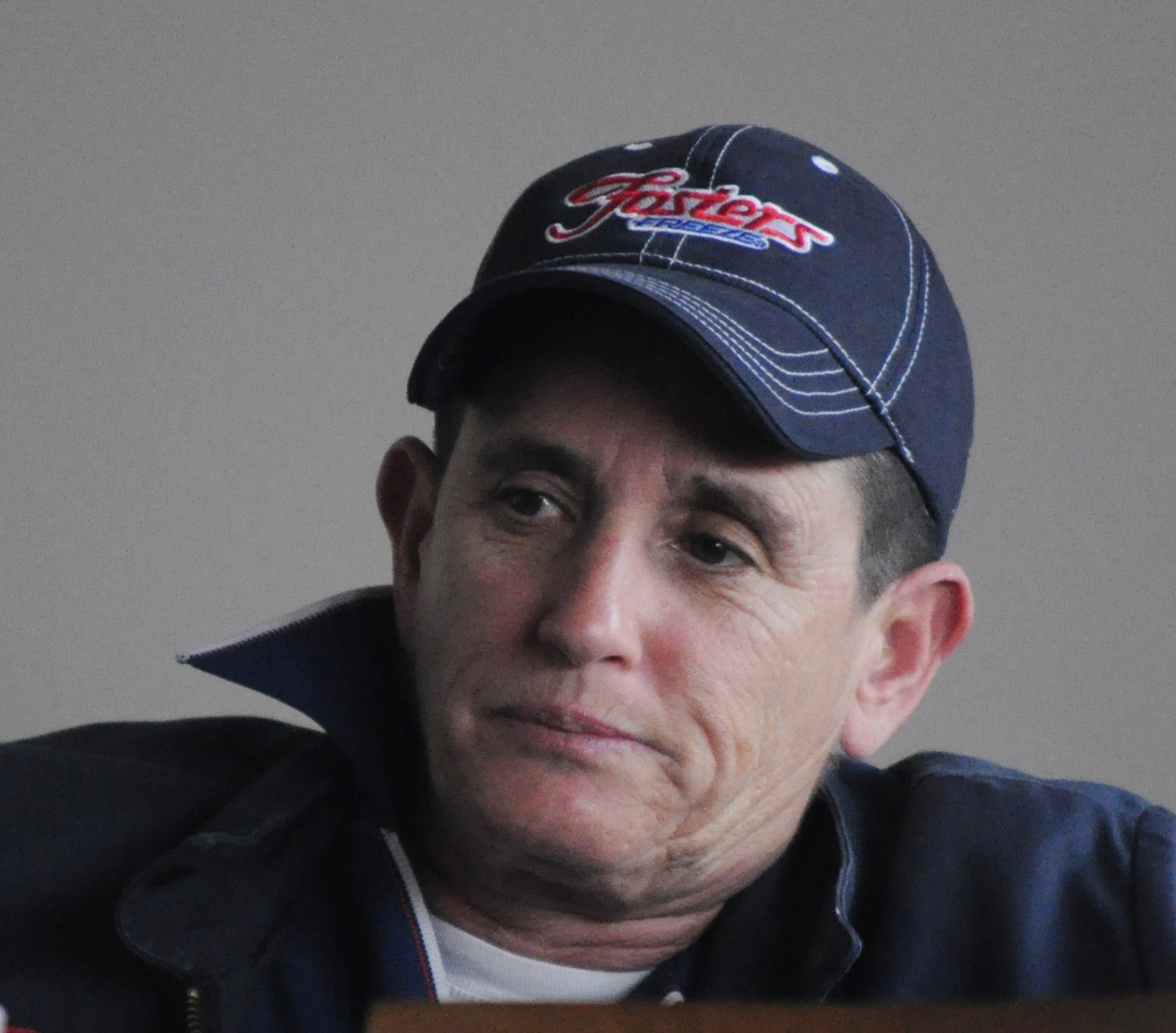
Phranc won Outstanding Recording Artist in 1992.

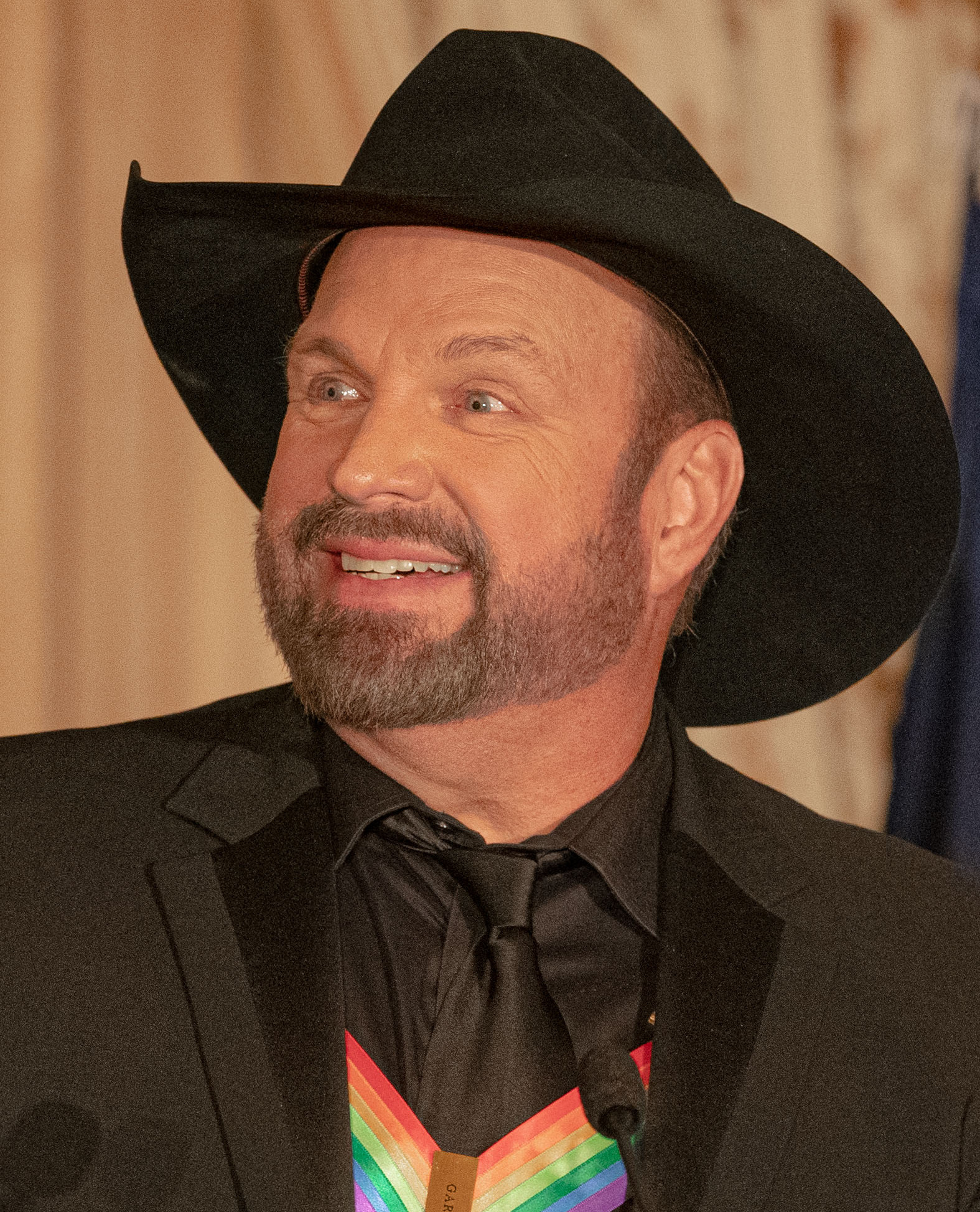
Garth Brooks won for "We Shall Be Free" (1992).

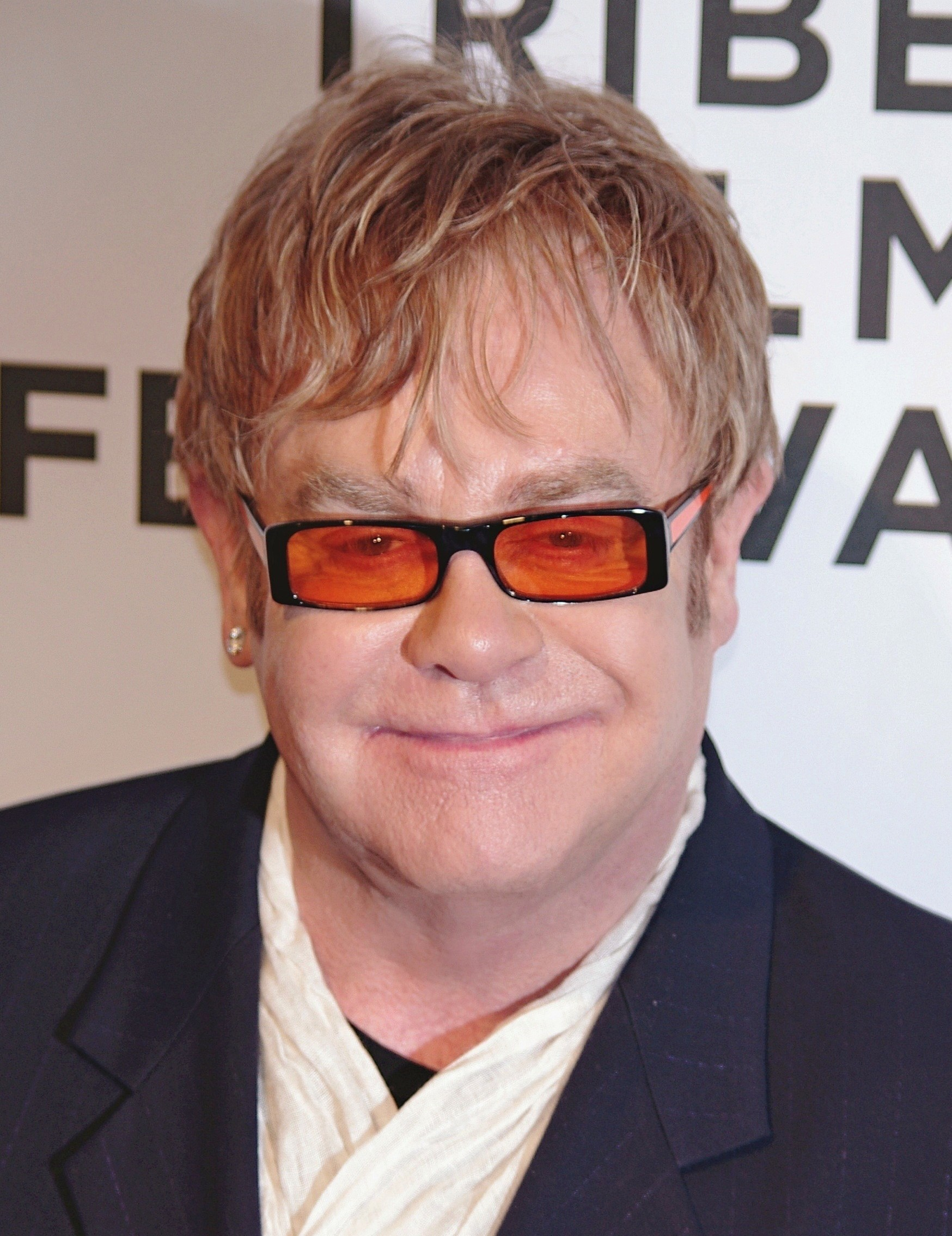
Elton John won for "The Last Song" (1992).

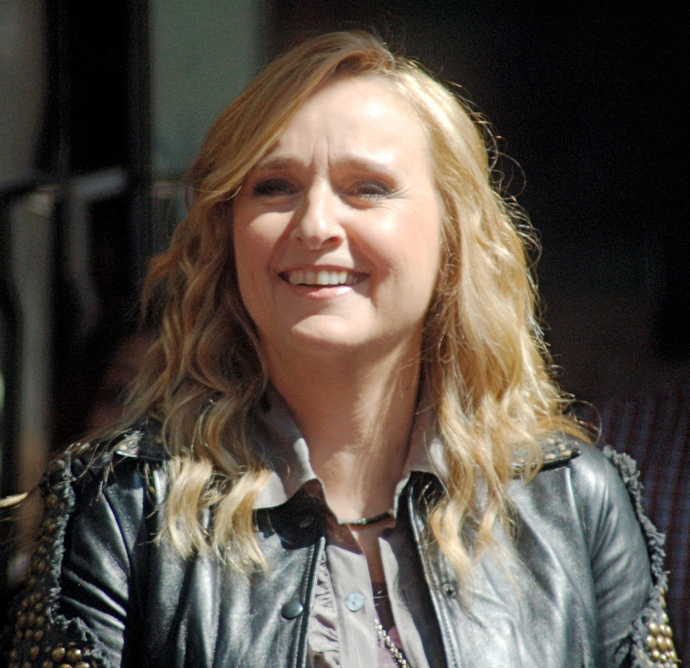
Melissa Etheridge won Outstanding Recording Artist in 1994, also winning awards for "I'm the Only One" (1994), and Greatest Hits: The Road Less Traveled (2005).

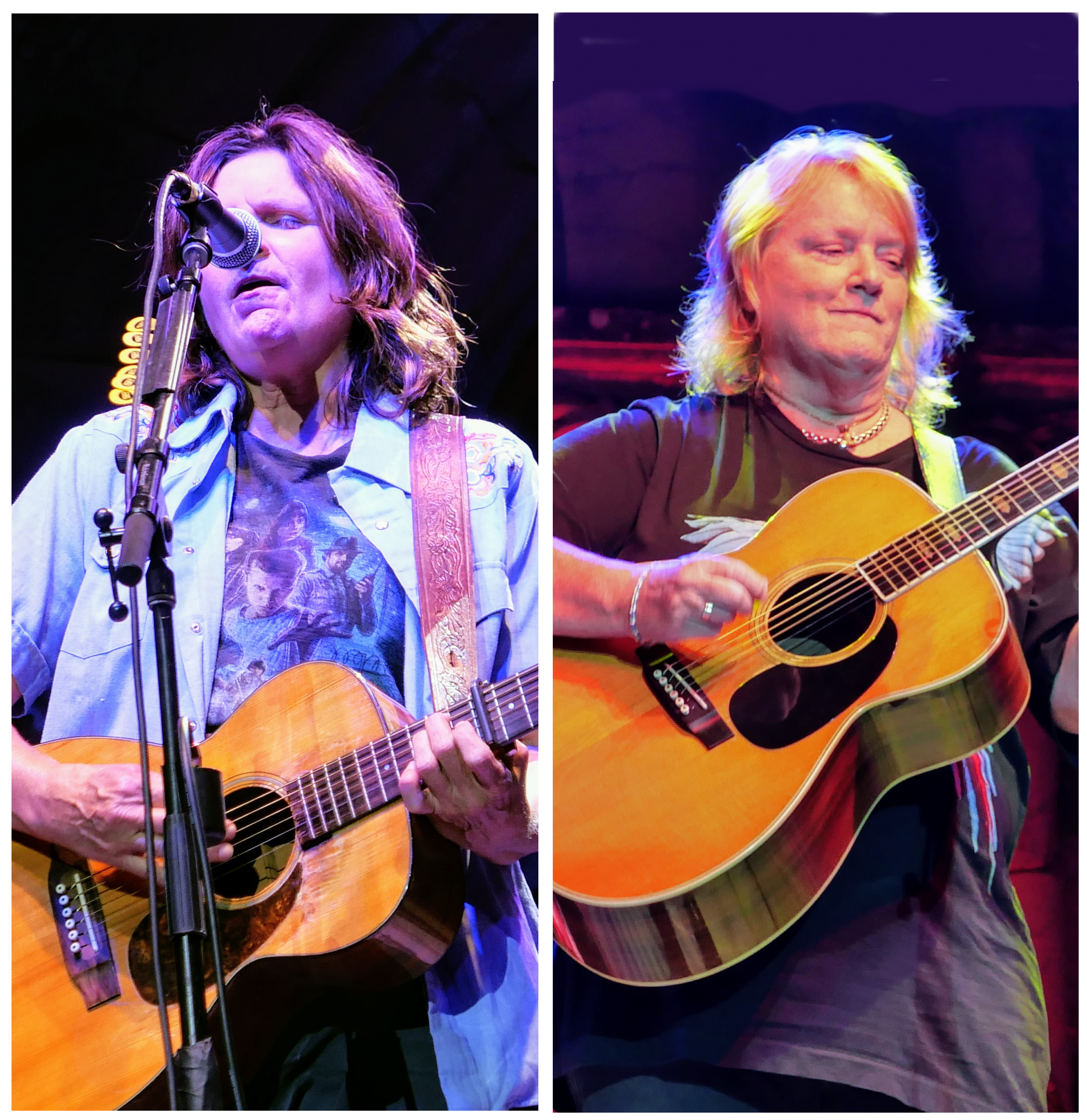
Indigo Girls won for "This Train Revised" (1994) and Come On Now Social (1999).

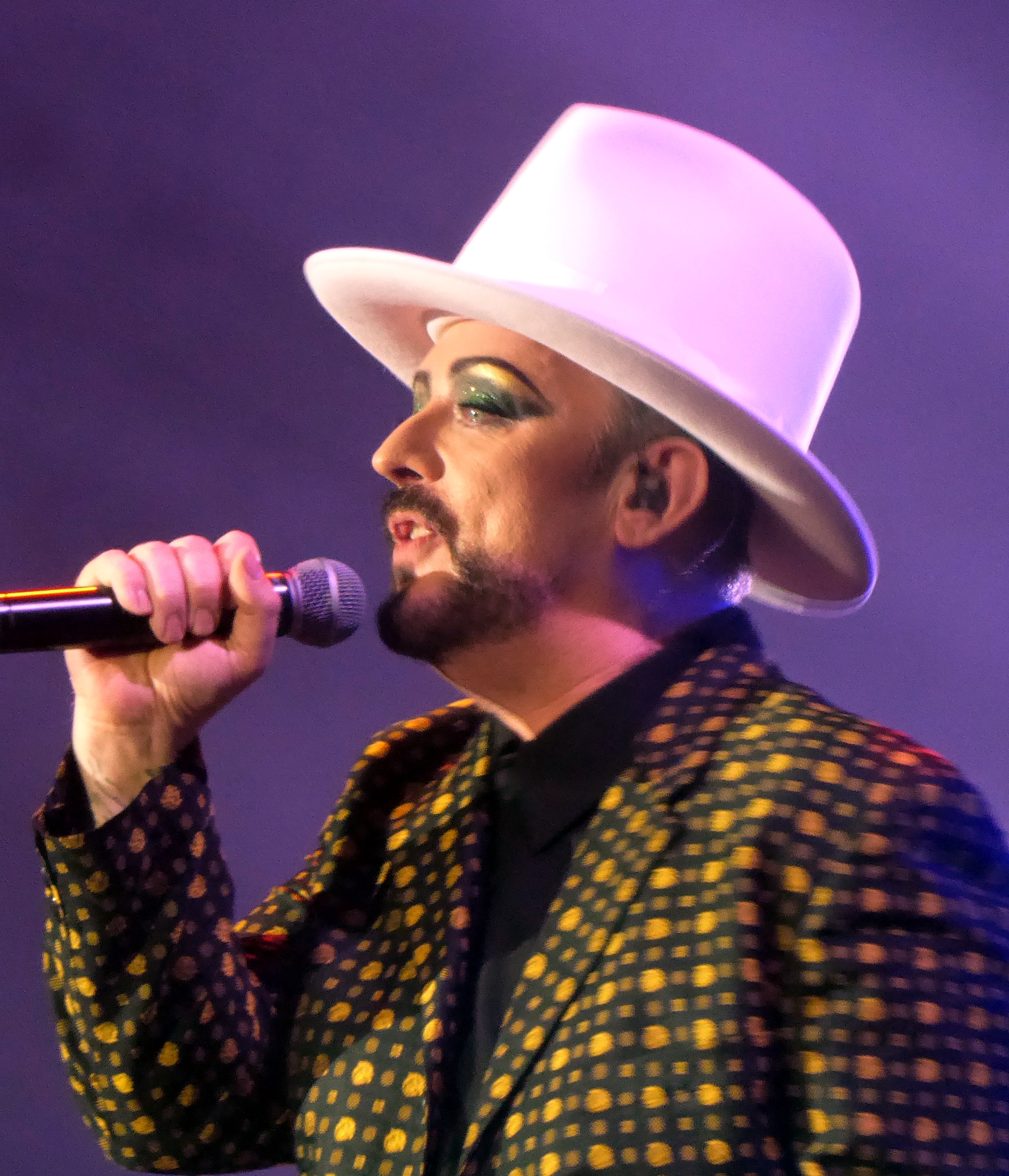
Boy George won for Cheapness and Beauty (1995).

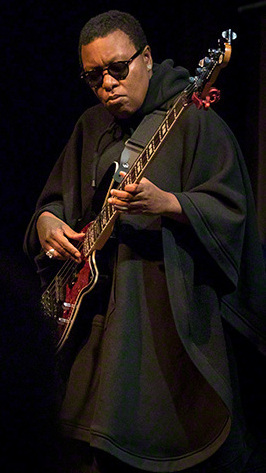
Meshell Ndegeocello won for "Leviticus: Faggot" (1996).

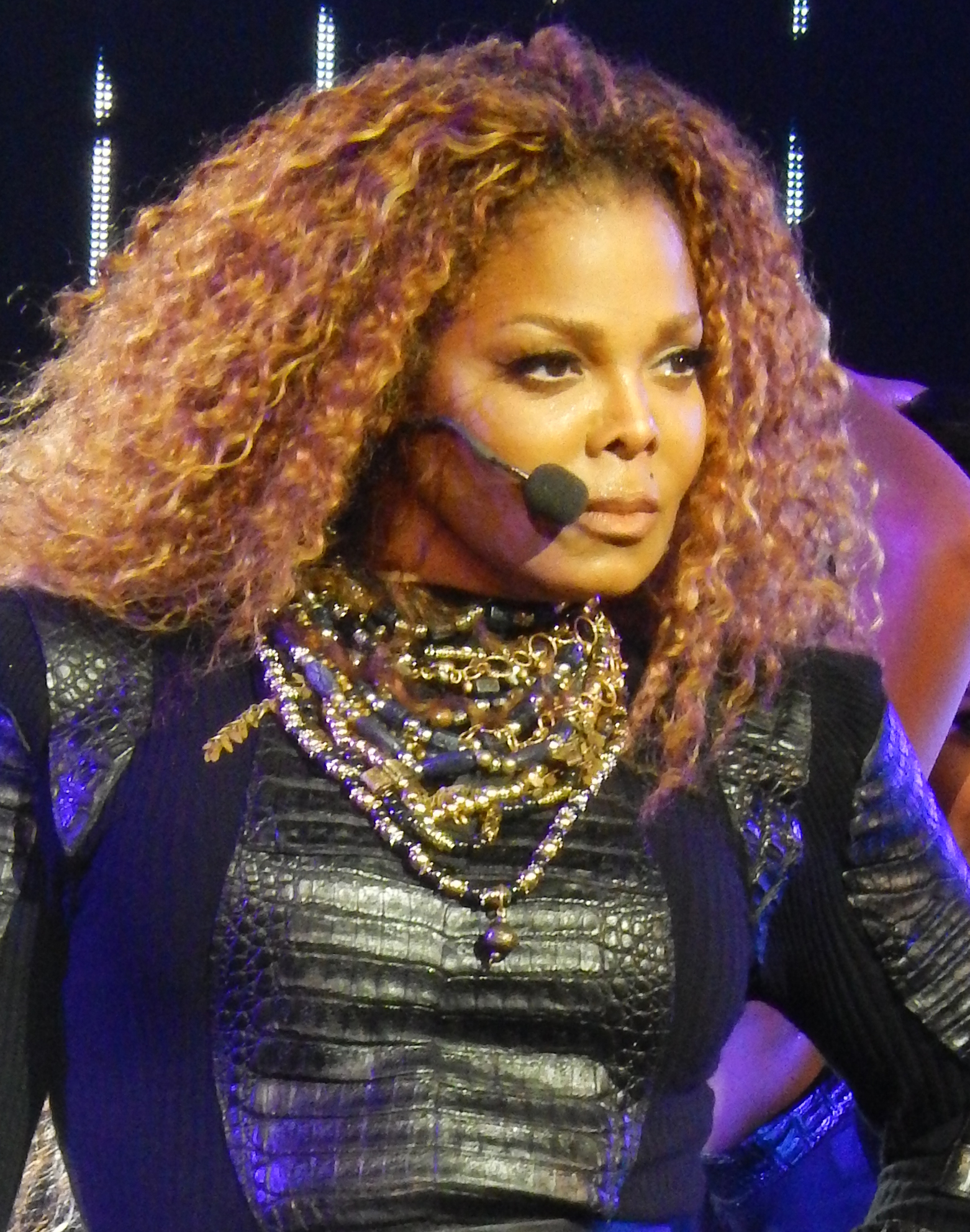
Janet Jackson won for The Velvet Rope (1997).

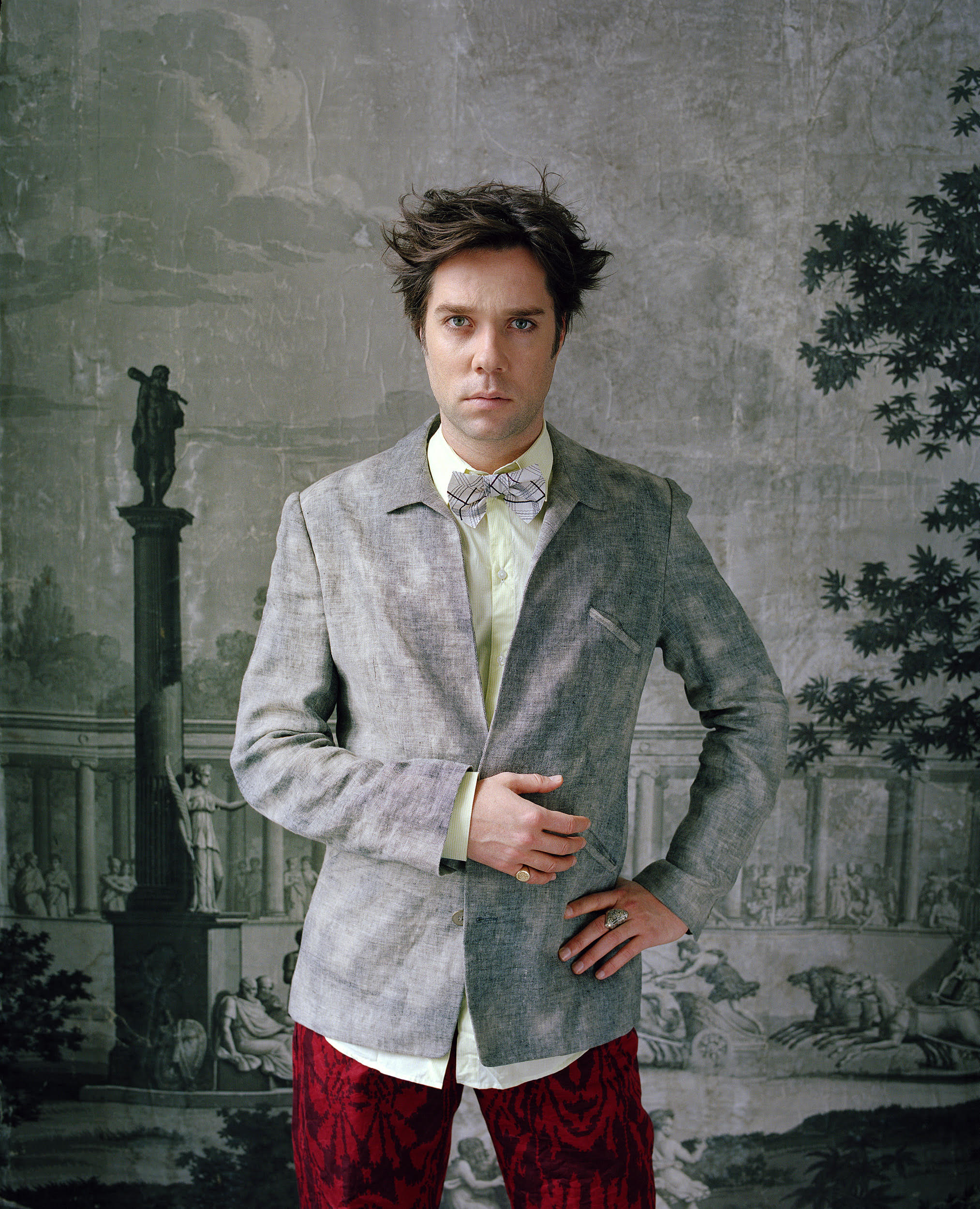
Rufus Wainwright has the most wins in this category for Rufus Wainwright (1998), Poses (2001), Want One (2003), and Release the Stars (2007).

1990s winners and nominees
Award year	Artist	Work	Label	Ref(s).
1991 (2nd)	Two Nice Girls ‡			
1992 (3rd)
1992 (3rd)	Outstanding Recording Artist			
1992 (3rd)	Phranc ‡			
1992 (3rd)	Outstanding Music Composition			
1992 (3rd)	John Corigliano ‡	"Symphony No. 1"	—N/a	
1993 (4th)
1993 (4th)	Outstanding Music Song			
1993 (4th)	Garth Brooks ‡	"We Shall Be Free"	Liberty	
1993 (4th)	Outstanding Music Video			
1993 (4th)	Elton John ‡	"The Last Song"	MCA	
1994 (5th)
1994 (5th)	Outstanding Recording Artist			
1994 (5th)	Melissa Etheridge ‡			
1995 (6th)
1995 (6th)	Outstanding Music Album			
1995 (6th)	Disappear Fear ‡	Disappear Fear	Rounder	
1995 (6th)	Outstanding Music Song			
1995 (6th)	Indigo Girls ‡	"This Train Revised"	Epic	
1995 (6th)	Outstanding Music Video			
1995 (6th)	Melissa Etheridge ‡	"I'm the Only One"	Island	
1996 (7th)
1996 (7th)	Outstanding Music Album			
1996 (7th)	Boy George ‡	Cheapness and Beauty	Virgin	
1996 (7th)	Outstanding Music Song			
1996 (7th)	Jill Sobule ‡	"I Kissed a Girl"	Atlantic	
1997 (8th)
1997 (8th)	Outstanding Music Album			
1997 (8th)	Extra Fancy ‡	Sinnerman	Diablo Musica	
1997 (8th)	Outstanding Music Song			
1997 (8th)	Meshell Ndegeocello ‡	"Leviticus: Faggot"	Maverick	
1998 (9th)
1998 (9th)	Outstanding Music Album			
1998 (9th)	Janet Jackson ‡	Velvet Rope	Virgin	
1998 (9th)	Ani DiFranco	Living in Clip	Righteous Babe	
1998 (9th)	Erasure	Cowboy	Mute	
1998 (9th)	Indigo Girls	Shaming of the Sun	Epic	
1998 (9th)	White Town	Women in Technology	Chrysalis	
1999 (10th)
1999 (10th)	Outstanding Music Album			
1999 (10th)	Rufus Wainwright ‡	Rufus Wainwright	DreamWorks	
1999 (10th)	The Murmurs	Blender	MCA	
1999 (10th)	Phranc	Milkman	Phancy	
1999 (10th)	Two	Voyeurs	Nothing	
1999 (10th)	Outstanding Music Single			
1999 (10th)	Queen Pen ‡	"Girlfriend"	Interscope	
1999 (10th)	Henry Rollins	"The Gay Thing"	DreamWorks	

=== 2000s ===
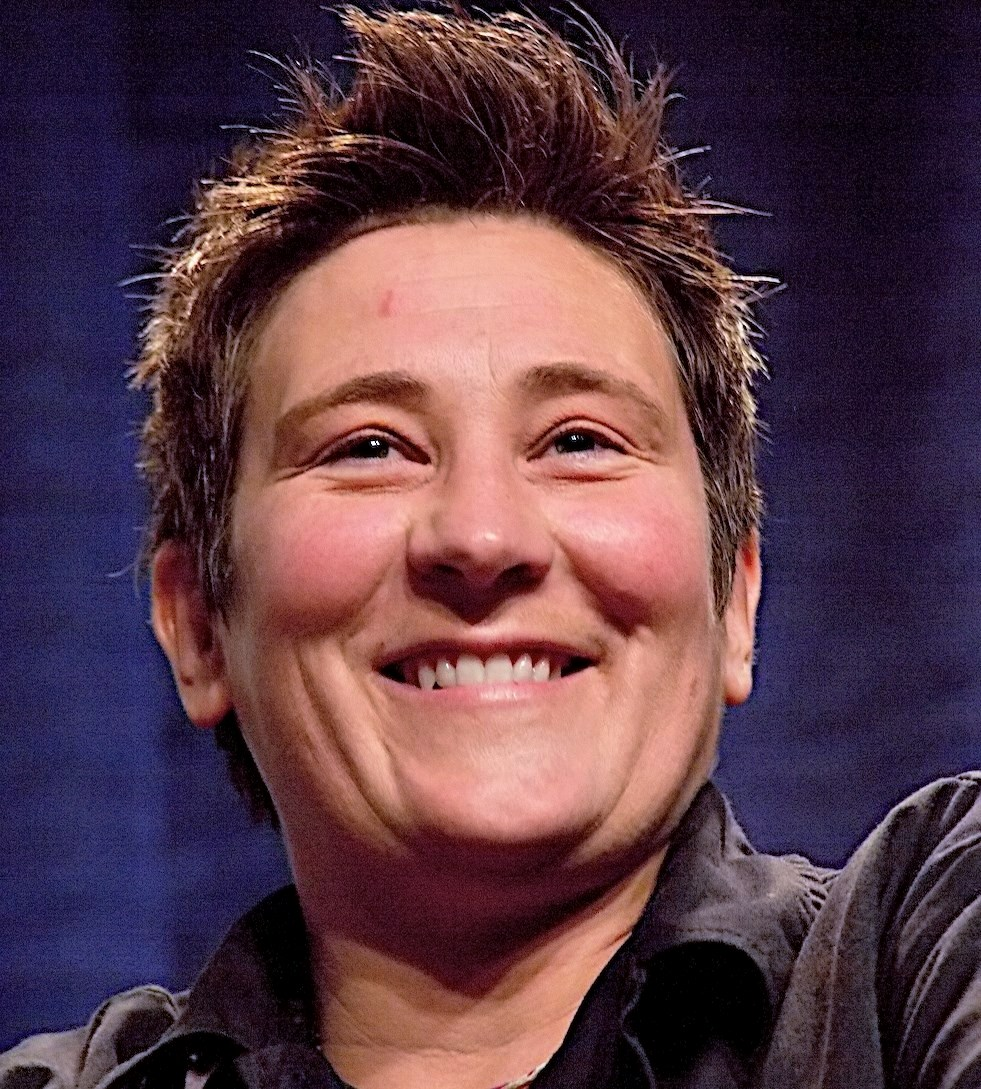
k.d. lang won for Invincible Summer (2000), A Wonderful World (2002), and Watershed (2008).

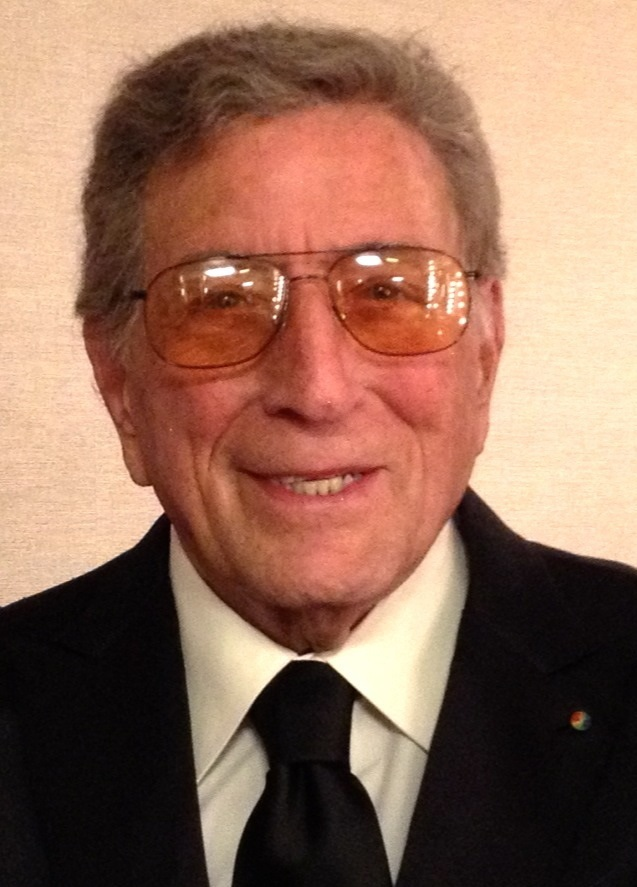
Tony Bennett won for A Wonderful World (2002).

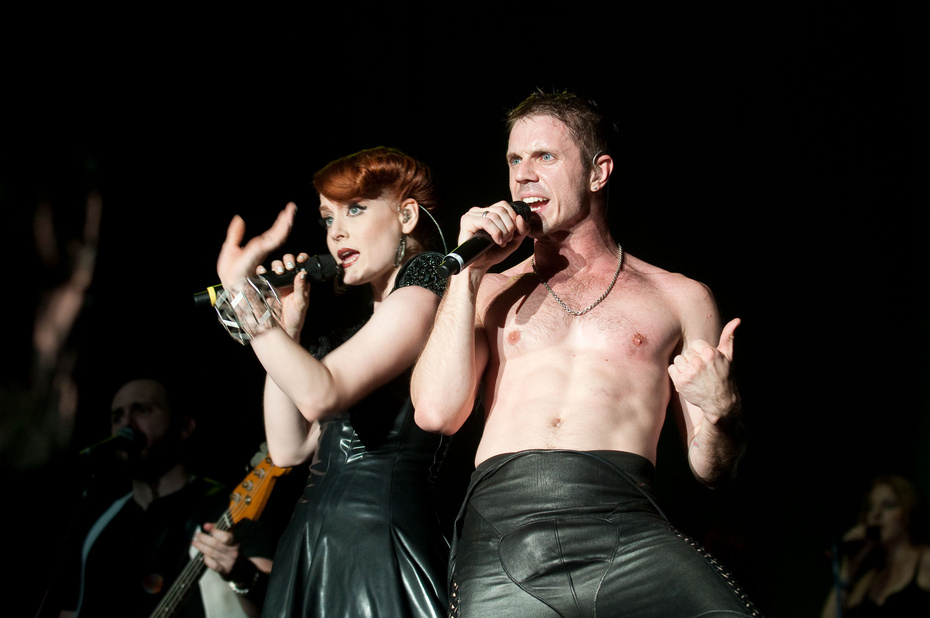
Scissor Sisters won for Scissor Sisters (2004), Ta-Dah (2006), and Night Work (2010).

2000s winners and nominees
Award year	Artist	Album	Label	Ref(s).
2000 (11th)	Indigo Girls ‡	Come On Now Social	Epic	
2000 (11th)	Melissa Etheridge	Breakdown	Island	
2000 (11th)	Meshell Ndegeocello	Bitter	Maverick	
2000 (11th)	Pet Shop Boys	Nightlife	Parlophone	
2000 (11th)	Sleater-Kinney	The Hot Rock	Kill Rock Stars	
2001 (12th)	k.d. lang ‡	Invincible Summer	Warner	
2001 (12th)	Stephen Gately	New Beginning	Polydor	
2001 (12th)	Janis Ian	God and the FBI	Windham Hill	
2001 (12th)	Patty Larkin	Regrooving the Dream	Vanguard	
2001 (12th)	Sleater-Kinney	All Hands on the Bad One	Kill Rock Stars	
2002 (13th)	Rufus Wainwright ‡	Poses	DreamWorks	
2002 (13th)	Lea DeLaria	Play It Cool	Warner	
2002 (13th)	David Del Tredici	Secret Music: A Songbook	Composers Recordings	
2002 (13th)	Melissa Etheridge	Skin	Island	
2002 (13th)	Gossip	That's Not What I Heard	Kill Rock Stars	
2003 (14th)	Tony Bennett and k.d. lang ‡	A Wonderful World	Sony	
2003 (14th)	Halford	Crucible	Sanctuary	
2003 (14th)	Indigo Girls	Become You	Epic	
2003 (14th)	Meshell Ndegeocello	Cookie: The Anthropological Mixtape	Maverick	
2003 (14th)	Pet Shop Boys	Release	Sanctuary	
2004 (15th)	Rufus Wainwright ‡	Want One	DreamWorks	
2004 (15th)	Bitch and Animal	Sour Juice and Rhyme	Righteous Babe	
2004 (15th)	Junior Senior	D-D-Don't Don't Stop the Beat	Atlantic	
2004 (15th)	Meshell Ndegeocello	Comfort Woman	Maverick	
2004 (15th)	Peaches	Fatherfucker	XL	
2005 (16th)	Scissor Sisters ‡	Scissor Sisters	Polydor	
2005 (16th)	Melissa Etheridge	Lucky	Island	
2005 (16th)	Le Tigre	This Island	Universal	
2005 (16th)	George Michael	Patience	Epic	
2005 (16th)	Rufus Wainwright	Want Two	Geffen	
2006 (17th)	Melissa Etheridge ‡	Greatest Hits: The Road Less Traveled	Island	
2006 (17th)	Antony and the Johnsons	I Am a Bird Now	Secretly Canadian	
2006 (17th)	Girlyman	Little Star	Daemon	
2006 (17th)	Sharon Isbin	Rodrigo, Villa-Lobos, Ponce: Guitar Concertos	Warner	
2006 (17th)	Amy Ray	Prom	Daemon	
2007 (18th)	Scissor Sisters ‡	Ta-Dah	Polydor	
2007 (18th)	The Ditty Bops	Moon Over the Freeway	Warner	
2007 (18th)	Final Fantasy	He Poos Clouds	Blocks Recording Club	
2007 (18th)	Peaches	Impeach My Bush	XL	
2007 (18th)	Pet Shop Boys	Fundamental	Parlophone	
2008 (19th)	Rufus Wainwright ‡	Release the Stars	Geffen	
2008 (19th)	Bloc Party	A Weekend in the City	Wichita	
2008 (19th)	The Cliks	Snakehouse	Tommy Boy	
2008 (19th)	Melissa Etheridge	The Awakening	Island	
2008 (19th)	Patrick Wolf	The Magic Position	Loog	
2009 (20th)	k.d. lang ‡	Watershed	Nonesuch	
2009 (20th)	Jay Brannan	Goddamned	Great Depression	
2009 (20th)	Hercules & Love Affair	Hercules and Love Affair	DFA	
2009 (20th)	The Magnetic Fields	Distortion	Nonesuch	
2009 (20th)	Sam Sparro	Sam Sparro	Island	

=== 2010s ===
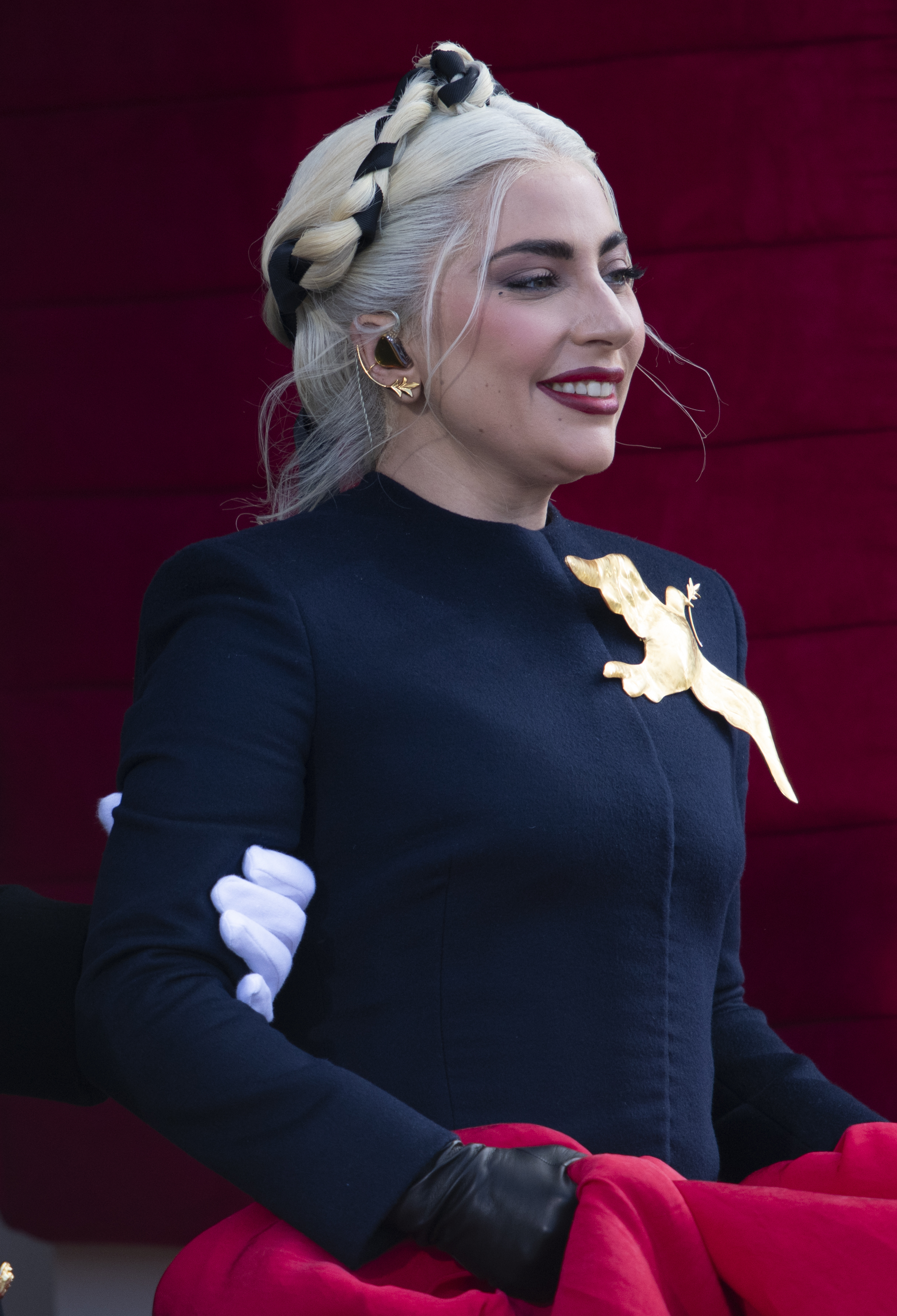
Lady Gaga won for The Fame Monster (2009) and Born This Way (2011).

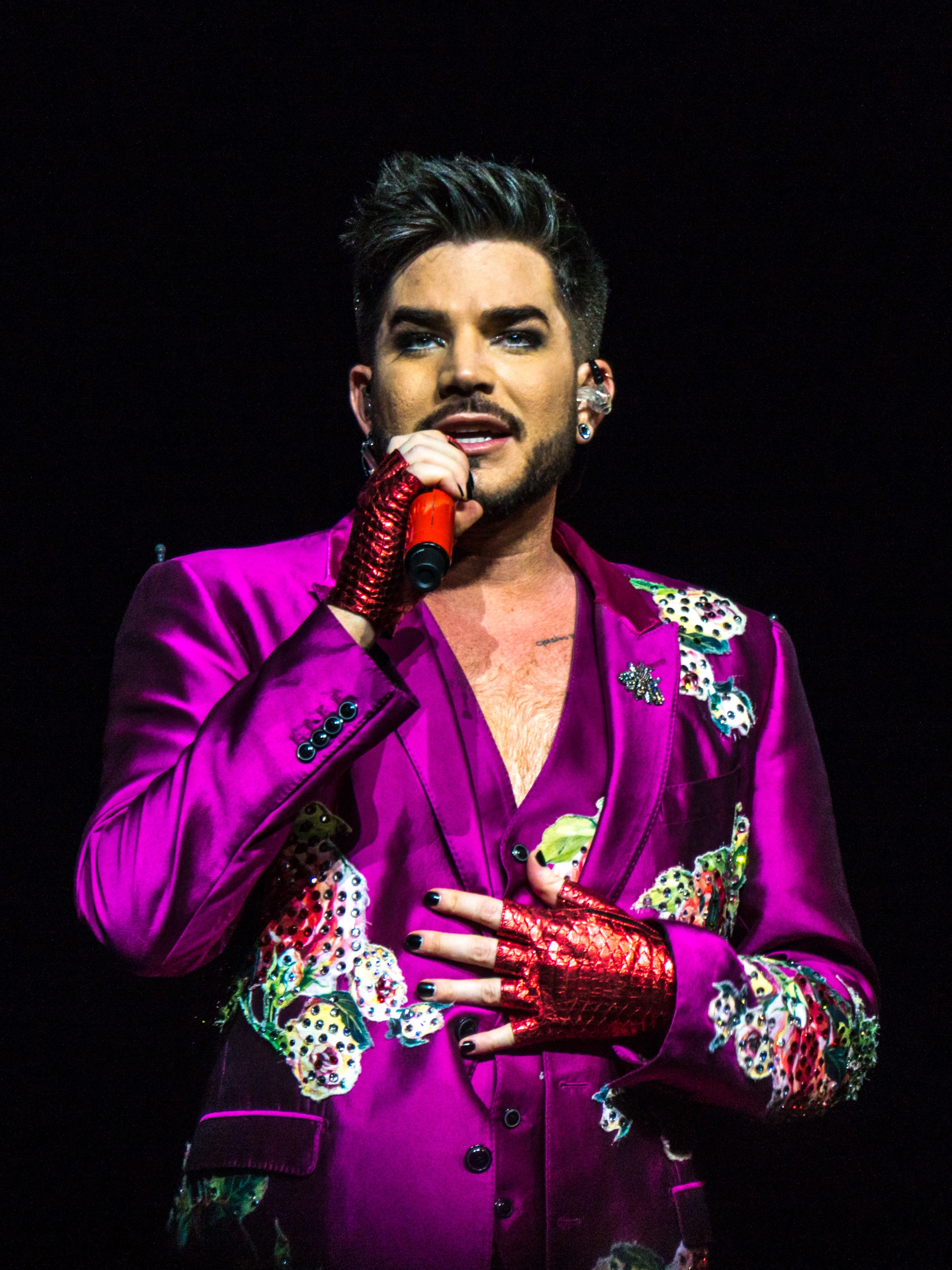
Adam Lambert won for Trespassing (2012).

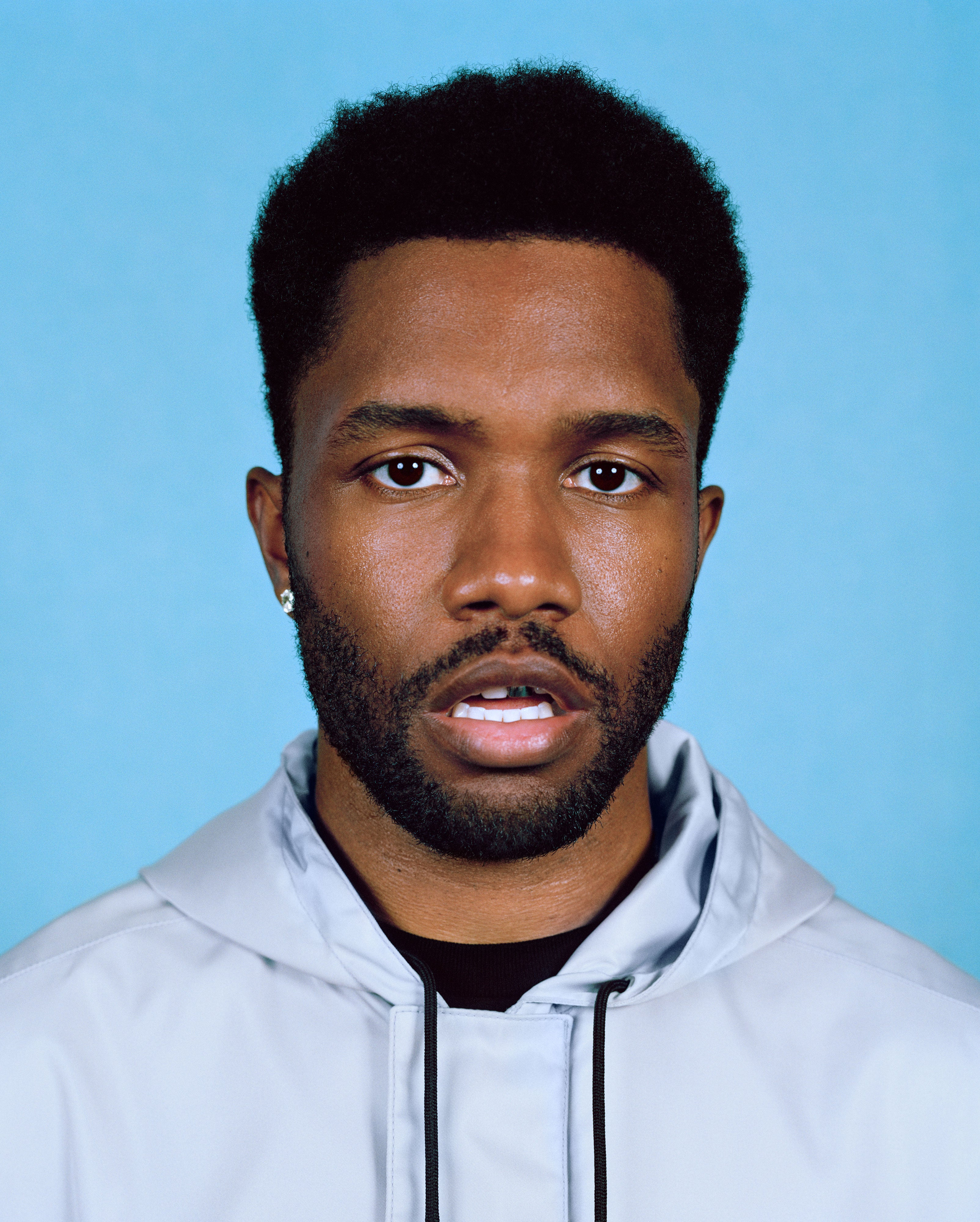
Frank Ocean won for Channel Orange (2012).

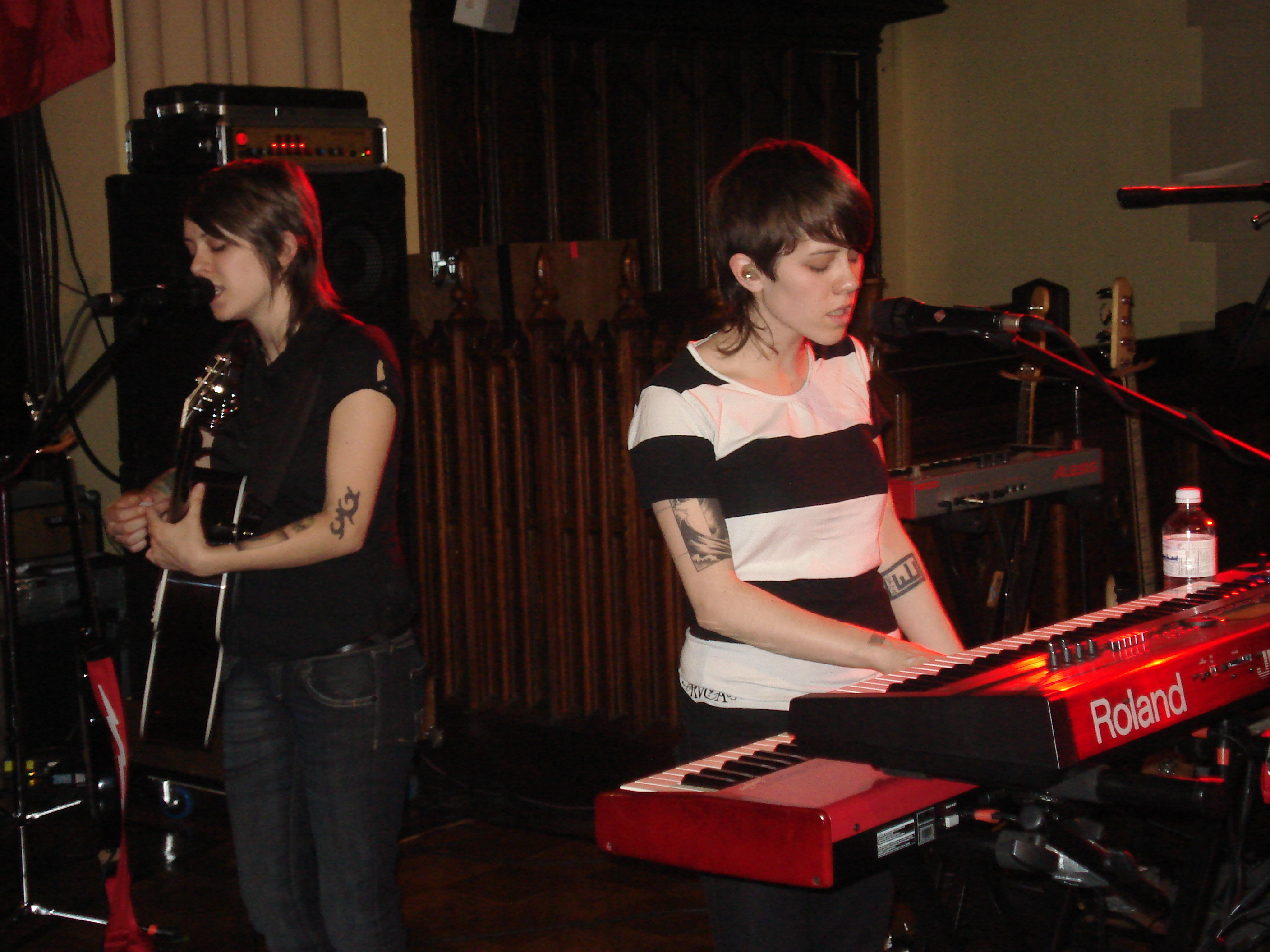
Tegan and Sara won the award for Heartthrob (2013) and Love You to Death (2016).

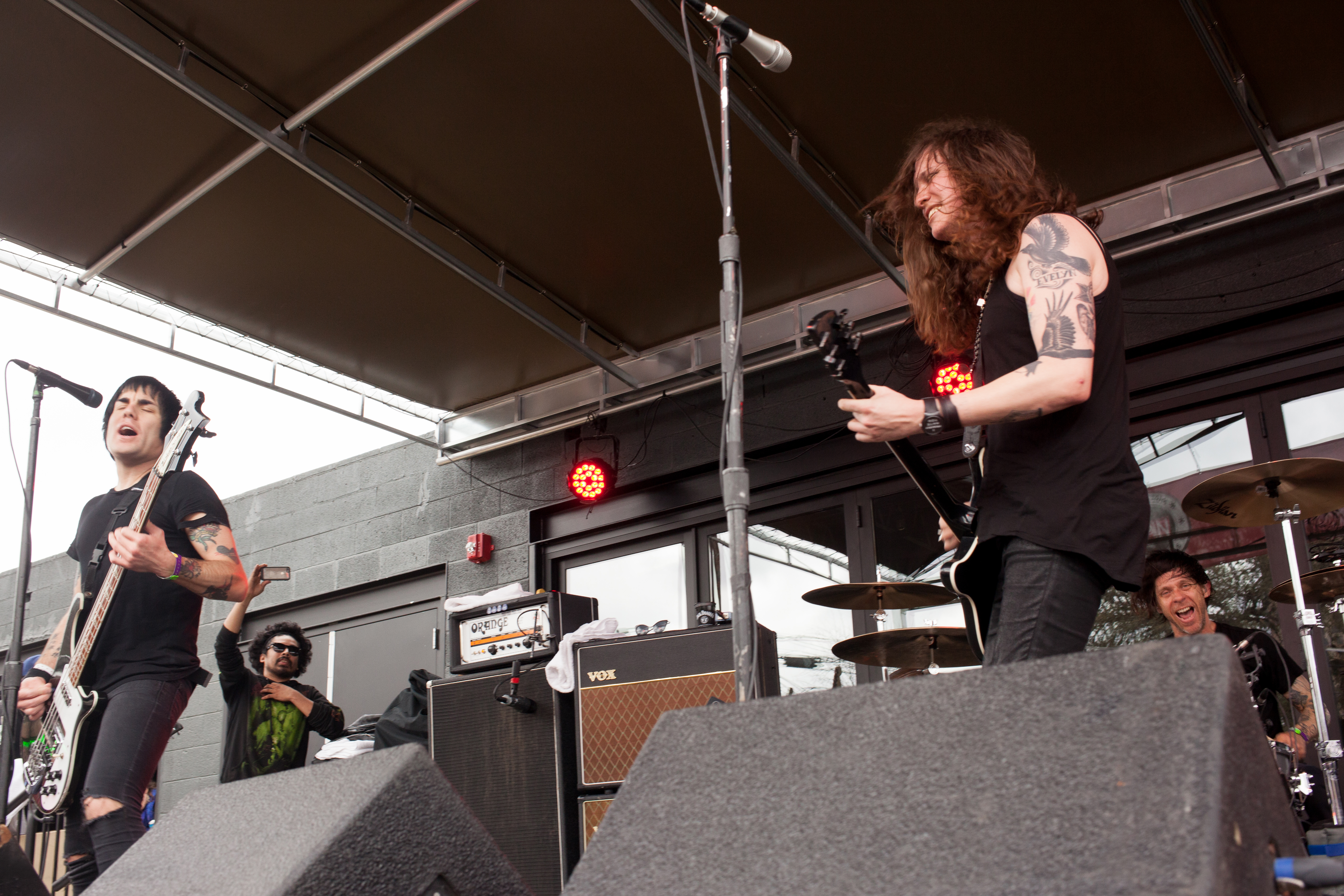
Against Me! won for Transgender Dysphoria Blues (2014).

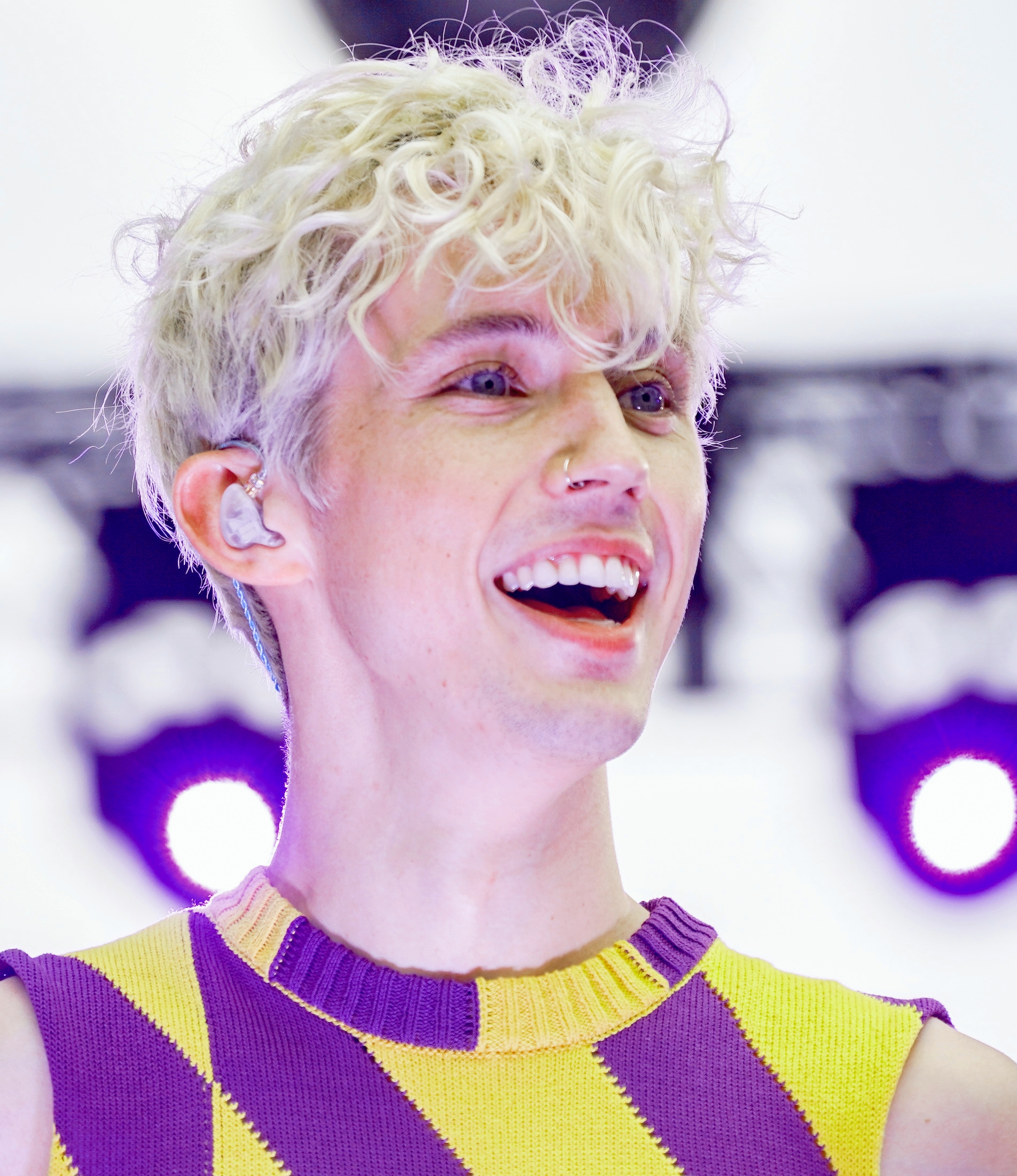
Troye Sivan won for Blue Neighbourhood (2015).

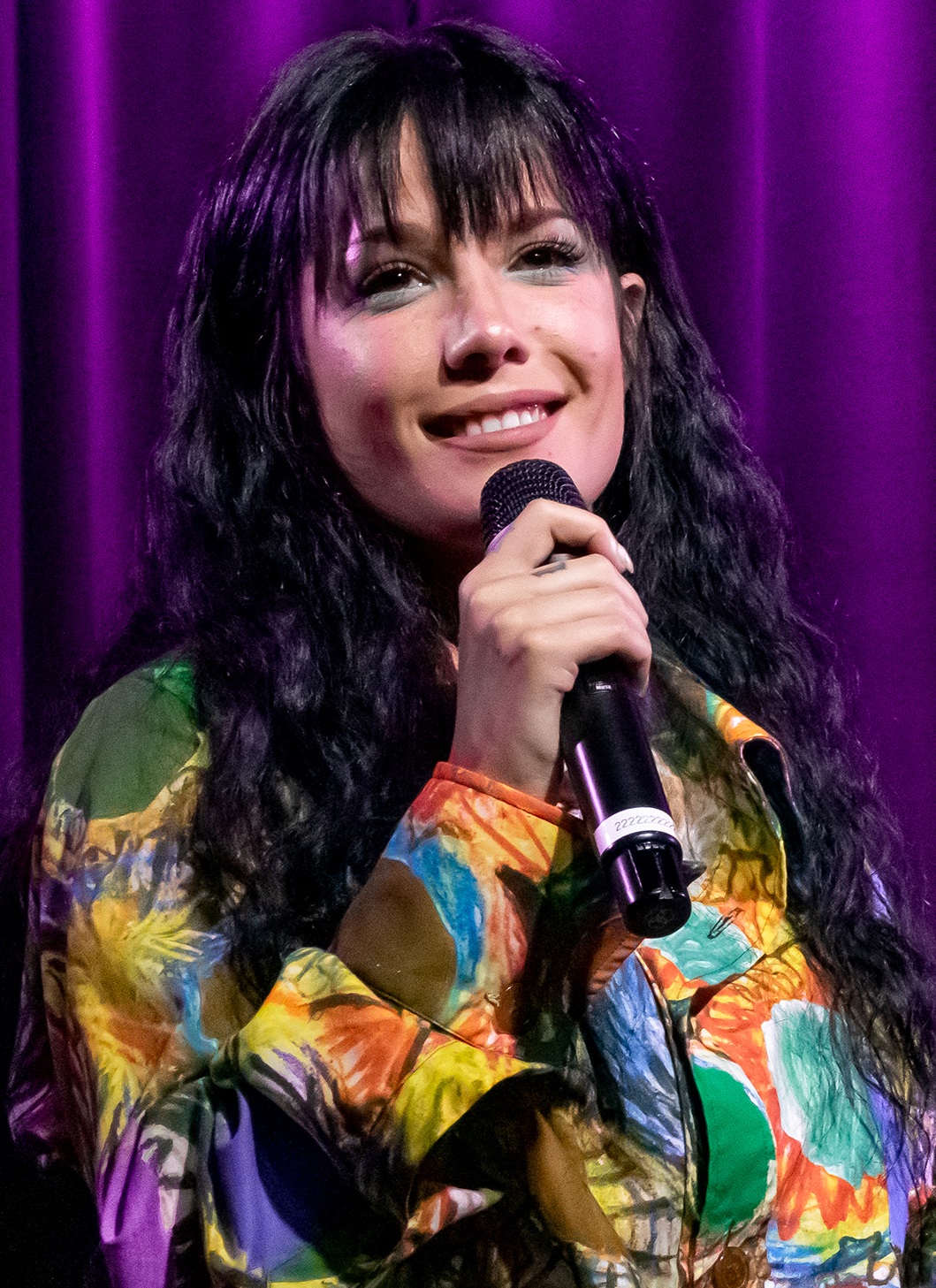
Halsey won for Hopeless Fountain Kingdom (2017).

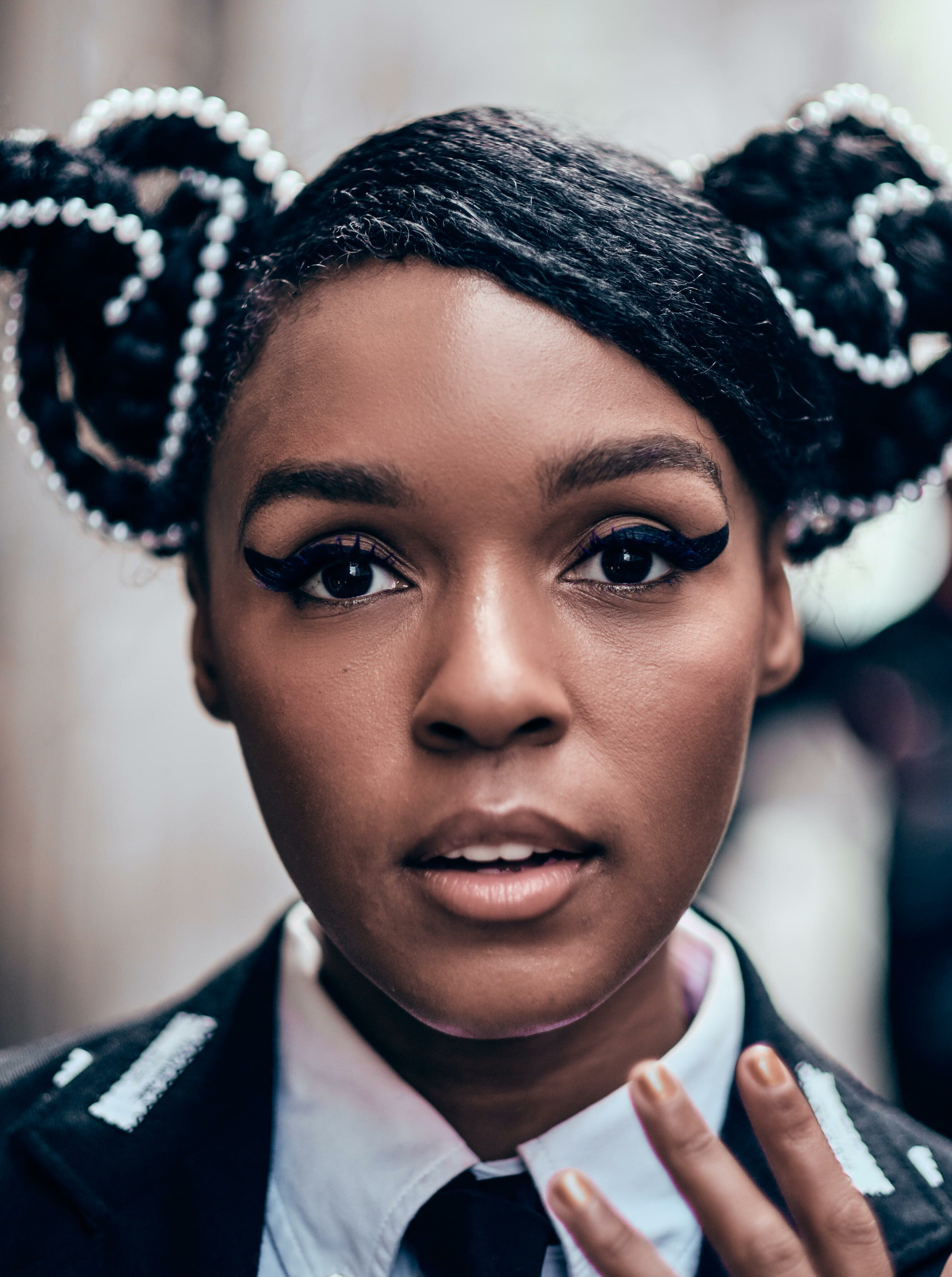
Janelle Monáe won for Dirty Computer (2018).

2010s winners and nominees
Award year	Artist	Album	Label	Ref(s).
2010 (21st)	Lady Gaga ‡	The Fame Monster	Interscope	
2010 (21st)	Brandi Carlile	Give Up the Ghost	Sony	
2010 (21st)	Gossip	Music for Men	Sony	
2010 (21st)	Adam Lambert	For Your Entertainment	RCA / 19	
2010 (21st)	Otep	Smash the Control Machine	Victory	
2011 (22nd)	Scissor Sisters ‡	Night Work	Downtown	
2011 (22nd)	Antony and the Johnsons	Swanlights	Secretly Canadian	
2011 (22nd)	Big Freedia	Big Freedia Hitz Vol. 1	Big Freedia Records	
2011 (22nd)	Kele Okereke	The Boxer	Glassnote	
2011 (22nd)	Chely Wright	Lifted Off the Ground	Vanguard	
2012 (23rd)	Lady Gaga ‡	Born This Way	Interscope	
2012 (23rd)	Girl in a Coma	Exits & All the Rest	Blackheart	
2012 (23rd)	Hunx and His Punx	Too Young to Be in Love	Hardly Art	
2012 (23rd)	Beverly McClellan	Fear Nothing	Oarfin	
2012 (23rd)	MEN	Talk About Body	Iamsound	
2013 (24th)	Adam Lambert ‡	Trespassing	RCA / 19	
2013 (24th)	Frank Ocean ‡	Channel Orange	Def Jam	
2013 (24th)	Gossip	A Joyful Noise	Columbia	
2013 (24th)	Scissor Sisters	Magic Hour	Casablanca	
2013 (24th)	Rufus Wainwright	Out of the Game	Decca / Polydor	
2014 (25th)	Tegan and Sara ‡	Heartthrob	Warner	
2014 (25th)	Lady Gaga	Artpop	Interscope	
2014 (25th)	Goldfrapp	Tales of Us	Mute	
2014 (25th)	Elton John	The Diving Board	Capitol	
2014 (25th)	Vampire Weekend	Modern Vampires of the City	XL	
2015 (26th)	Against Me! ‡	Transgender Dysphoria Blues	Xtra Mile	
2015 (26th)	Mary Gauthier	Trouble & Love	In the Black	
2015 (26th)	Angel Haze	Dirty Gold	Island / Republic	
2015 (26th)	Mary Lambert	Heart on My Sleeve	Capitol	
2015 (26th)	Sam Smith	In the Lonely Hour	Capitol	
2016 (27th)	Troye Sivan ‡	Blue Neighbourhood	Capitol	
2016 (27th)	Brandi Carlile	The Firewatcher's Daughter	ATO	
2016 (27th)	Miley Cyrus	Miley Cyrus & Her Dead Petz	Smiley Miley	
2016 (27th)	Adam Lambert	The Original High	Warner	
2016 (27th)	Le1f	Riot Boi	XL / Terrible	
2017 (28th)	Tegan and Sara ‡	Love You to Death	Warner	
2017 (28th)	Against Me!	Shape Shift with Me	Total Treble / Xtra Mile	
2017 (28th)	Blood Orange	Freetown Sound	Domino	
2017 (28th)	Brandy Clark	Big Day in a Small Town	Warner	
2017 (28th)	Lady Gaga	Joanne	Interscope	
2017 (28th)	Tyler Glenn	Excommunication	Island	
2017 (28th)	Ty Herndon	House on Fire	BFD	
2017 (28th)	Elton John	Wonderful Crazy Night	Island	
2017 (28th)	Frank Ocean	Blonde	Boys Don't Cry	
2017 (28th)	Sia	This Is Acting	RCA	
2018 (29th)	Halsey ‡	Hopeless Fountain Kingdom	Astralwerks	
2018 (29th)	Miley Cyrus	Younger Now	RCA	
2018 (29th)	Honey Dijon	The Best of Both Worlds	Classic Music Company	
2018 (29th)	Kehlani	SweetSexySavage	TSNMI / Atlantic	
2018 (29th)	Kelela	Take Me Apart	Warp	
2018 (29th)	Kesha	Rainbow	Kemosabe / RCA	
2018 (29th)	Perfume Genius	No Shape	Matador	
2018 (29th)	Sam Smith	The Thrill of It All	Capitol	
2018 (29th)	St. Vincent	Masseduction	Loma Vista	
2018 (29th)	Wrabel	We Could Be Beautiful	Epic / Sony	
2019 (30th)	Janelle Monáe ‡	Dirty Computer	Bad Boy	
2019 (30th)	Brockhampton	Iridescence	RCA	
2019 (30th)	Brandi Carlile	By the Way, I Forgive You	Low Country Sound / Elektra	
2019 (30th)	Christine and the Queens	Chris	Because	
2019 (30th)	Shea Diamond	Seen It All	Asylum Worldwide	
2019 (30th)	Hayley Kiyoko	Expectations	Atlantic	
2019 (30th)	Kim Petras	Turn Off the Light, Vol. 1	BunHead	
2019 (30th)	Troye Sivan	Bloom	Capitol	
2019 (30th)	Sophie	Oil of Every Pearl's Un-Insides	Future Classic	
2019 (30th)	Years & Years	Palo Santo	Polydor	

=== 2020s ===
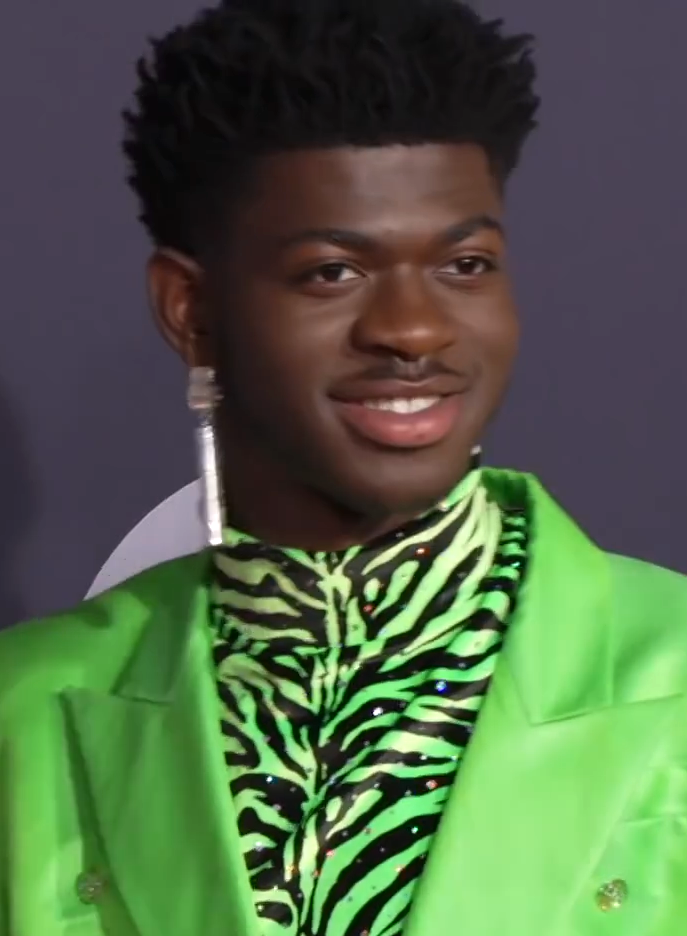
Lil Nas X won for 7 (2019) and Montero (2021).

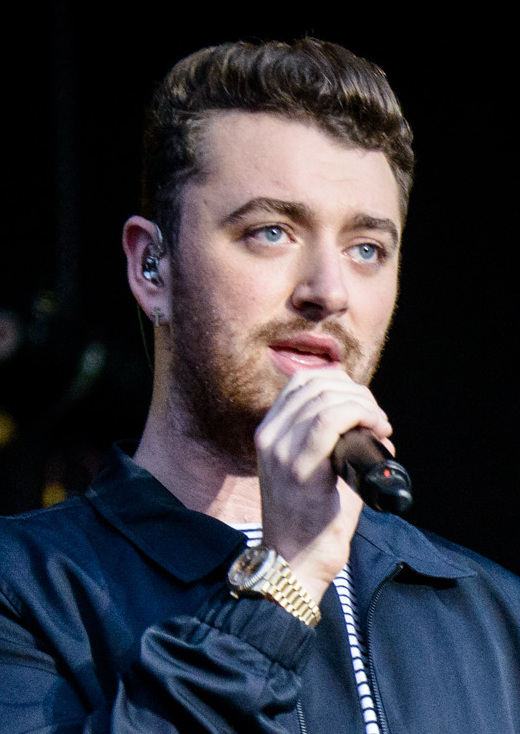
Sam Smith won for Love Goes (2020).

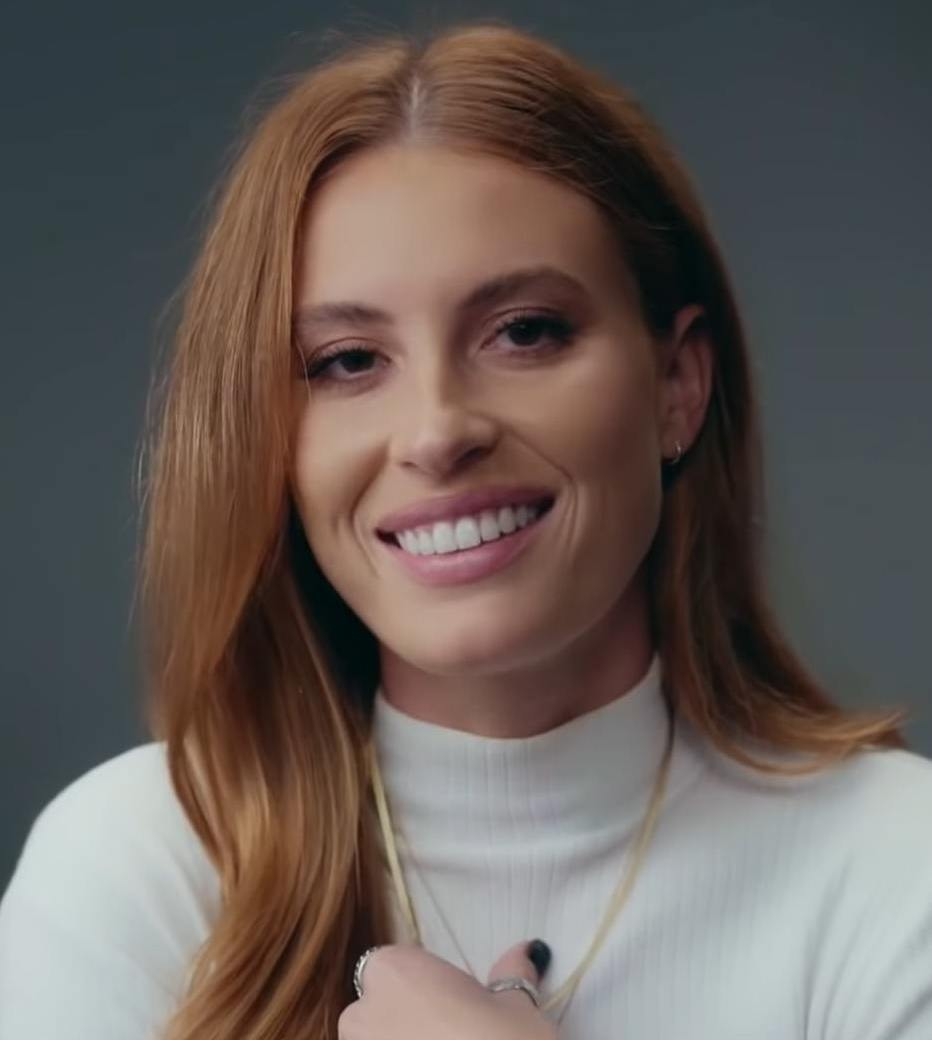
Fletcher won for Girl of My Dreams (2022).

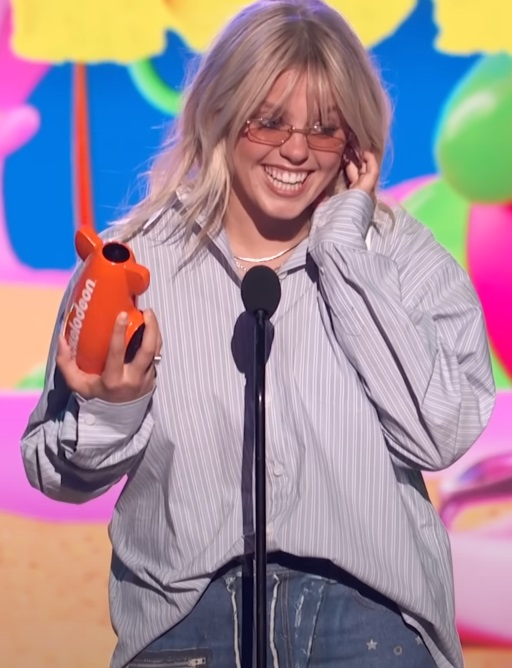
Reneé Rapp won for Snow Angel (2023).

2020s winners and nominees
Award year	Artist	Album	Label	Ref(s).
2020 (31st)	Lil Nas X ‡	7	Columbia	
2020 (31st)	Adam Lambert	Velvet: Side A	More Is More / Empire	
2020 (31st)	Brittany Howard	Jaime	ATO	
2020 (31st)	Kevin Abstract	Arizona Baby	Question Everything / RCA	
2020 (31st)	Kim Petras	Clarity	BunHead	
2020 (31st)	King Princess	Cheap Queen	Zelig / Columbia	
2020 (31st)	Melissa Etheridge	The Medicine Show	ME / Concord	
2020 (31st)	Mika	My Name Is Michael Holbrook	Casablanca / Republic	
2020 (31st)	Tegan and Sara	Hey, I'm Just Like You	Sire	
2020 (31st)	Young M.A	Herstory in the Making	M.A Music / 3D	
2021 (32nd)	Sam Smith ‡	Love Goes	Capitol	
2021 (32nd)	Adam Lambert	Velvet	More Is More / Empire	
2021 (32nd)	Brandy Clark	Your Life Is a Record	Warner	
2021 (32nd)	Halsey	Manic	Capitol	
2021 (32nd)	Kehlani	It Was Good Until It Wasn't	Atlantic	
2021 (32nd)	Lady Gaga	Chromatica	Streamline / Interscope	
2021 (32nd)	Miley Cyrus	Plastic Hearts	RCA	
2021 (32nd)	Pabllo Vittar	111	BMT / Sony Music Brasil	
2021 (32nd)	Peppermint	A Girl Like Me: Letters to My Lovers	Producer Entertainment Group	
2021 (32nd)	Ricky Martin	Pausa	Sony Latin	
2022 (33rd)	Lil Nas X ‡	Montero	Columbia	
2022 (33rd)	Brandi Carlile	In These Silent Days	Low Country Sound / Elektra	
2022 (33rd)	Brockhampton	Roadrunner: New Light, New Machine	Question Everything / RCA	
2022 (33rd)	Demi Lovato	Dancing with the Devil... the Art of Starting Over	Island	
2022 (33rd)	Elton John	The Lockdown Sessions	Interscope	
2022 (33rd)	Halsey	If I Can't Have Love, I Want Power	Capitol	
2022 (33rd)	Kaytranada	Intimidated	RCA	
2022 (33rd)	Melissa Etheridge	One Way Out	BMG	
2022 (33rd)	Mykki Blanco	Broken Hearts and Beauty Sleep	Transgressive	
2022 (33rd)	St. Vincent	Daddy's Home	Loma Vista	
2023 (34th)	Fletcher ‡	Girl of My Dreams	Capitol	
2023 (34th)	Anitta	Versions of Me	Warner	
2023 (34th)	Betty Who	Big!	BMG	
2023 (34th)	Demi Lovato	Holy Fvck	Island	
2023 (34th)	Hayley Kiyoko	Panorama	Atlantic	
2023 (34th)	Honey Dijon	Black Girl Magic	Classic Music Company	
2023 (34th)	Kim Petras	Slut Pop	Republic	
2023 (34th)	Muna	Muna	Saddest Factory	
2023 (34th)	Orville Peck	Bronco	Columbia	
2023 (34th)	Rina Sawayama	Hold the Girl	Dirty Hit	
2024 (35th)	Reneé Rapp ‡	Snow Angel	Interscope	
2024 (35th)	Billy Porter	Black Mona Lisa	Island UK / Republic	
2024 (35th)	boygenius	The Record	Interscope	
2024 (35th)	Brandy Clark	Brandy Clark	Warner	
2024 (35th)	Janelle Monáe	The Age of Pleasure	Atlantic	
2024 (35th)	Kim Petras	Feed the Beast and Problématique	Amigo / Republic	
2024 (35th)	Miley Cyrus	Endless Summer Vacation	Columbia	
2024 (35th)	Sam Smith	Gloria	Capitol	
2024 (35th)	Troye Sivan	Something to Give Each Other	EMI Australia / Capitol	
2024 (35th)	Victoria Monét	JAGUAR II	Lovett Music / RCA	
2025 (36th)	Doechii ‡	Alligator Bites Never Heal	Top Dawg	
2025 (36th)	Adam Lambert	AFTERS	More Is More	
2025 (36th)	Billie Eilish	Hit Me Hard and Soft	Interscope	
2025 (36th)	Elton John	Never Too Late: Soundtrack	UMG	
2025 (36th)	Joy Oladokun	Observations From A Crowded Room	Republic	
2025 (36th)	Kali Uchis	ORQUÍDEAS	Geffen	
2025 (36th)	Omar Apollo	God Said No	Warner	
2025 (36th)	Orville Peck	Stampede	Warner	
2025 (36th)	Tove Lo	HEAT	Pretty Swede	
2025 (36th)	Victoria Monét	JAGUAR II (Deluxe Edition)	Lovett / RCA	
2026 (37th)	Young Miko ‡	Do Not Disturb	The Wave / Capitol	
2026 (37th)	Conan Gray	Wishbone	Republic	
2026 (37th)	Durand Bernarr	Bloom	Durand Bernarr / DSing / Create	
2026 (37th)	Elton John & Brandi Carlile	Who Believes in Angels	Interscope	
2026 (37th)	Ethel Cain	Willoughby Tucker, I'll Always Love You	Daughters of Cain	
2026 (37th)	G Flip	Dream Ride	G Flip / AWAL	
2026 (37th)	Lady Gaga	Mayhem	Streamline / Interscope	
2026 (37th)	Maren Morris	Dreamsicle	Columbia	
2026 (37th)	Reneé Rapp	Bite Me	Interscope	
2026 (37th)	Ty Herndon	THIRTY, Vol. 1	Club44	

== Multiple wins and nominations ==
The following individuals received two or more Outstanding Music Artist awards:

Wins	Music Artist	Nominations
4	Rufus Wainwright	6
3	Melissa Etheridge	9
3	Scissor Sisters	4
3	k.d. lang	3
2	Lady Gaga	6
2	Indigo Girls	4
2	Tegan and Sara	3
2	Lil Nas X	2

The following individuals were nominated for four or more Outstanding Music Artist awards:

Nominations	Music Artist
9	Melissa Etheridge
6	Rufus Wainwright
6	Lady Gaga
6	Elton John
5	Adam Lambert
5	Brandi Carlile
4	Scissor Sisters
4	Meshell Ndegeocello
4	Indigo Girls
