= Ulali =

Native American a cappella group

- Also known as: Ulali Project
- Origin: North Carolina, U.S.
- Genres: A capella, gospel, Indigenous
- Years active: 1987–present
- Past members: Original members: Pura Fé, Jennifer Kreisberg, Soni Moreno-Primeau

Ulali (/juːlɑːˈliː/) is an a cappella group. Ulali was founded in 1987 by original members Pura Fé, Soni Moreno, and Jennifer Kreisberg.

Ulali's sound appropriates an array of Indigenous music including Southeast United States choral singing (pre-blues and gospel) and pre-Columbian music. Ulali's live performances address themes of Native struggles and accomplishments.

== History ==
The group was first called Pura Fé and included three female singers and three males. Later, the group became a duo comprising singers, Soni Moreno and Pura Fé before eventually becoming a trio.

Ulali has traveled throughout the United States, Canada, and abroad performing at venues like Woodstock 94, the 1996 Olympics in Atlanta, the 1997 Smithsonian's Folkways 50th Anniversary Gala at Carnegie Hall, the Kennedy Center, Lincoln Center, the 1998 WOMAD Festival in Seattle, the 1998 New Orleans Jazz & Heritage Festival, the 1999 World Festival of Sacred Music at the Hollywood Bowl, Red Solstice 2000 in Montréal, the Britt Festival 2000 in Oregon, V Day 2001 at Madison Square Garden, the 2001 New Orleans Jazz & Heritage Festival, the 2002 Olympics in Salt Lake City, and a wide range of other venues, benefit performances, and festivals. They have performed abroad in Brazil, Corsica, England, France, Fiji, Germany, Italy, Japan, Morocco, New Caledonia and Portugal. Ulali has traveled throughout Indian country (United States, Canada, Central America and South America) visiting communities, singing, and exchanging songs. They also perform at powwows and can often be heard on Native radio stations throughout the United States and Canada.

The group participated in the Indigo Girls recording Shaming of the Sun, and opened for and performed with the Indigo Girls in several cities in 1997. Ulali also contributed to the Indigo Girls benefit recording project Honor the Earth and participated in the national tour of the same name.

Ulali was featured on the soundtrack of the Miramax feature film Smoke Signals. They performed at the 1998 Sundance Film Festival in support of Smoke Signals, which won the Audience Choice Award and Filmmaker's Trophy. Ulali recorded on the soundtrack for the Turner documentary series The Native Americans. They subsequently had two of their songs, "Mahk Jchi" (written in a compilation of the Tutelo and Saponi languages) and "Ancestor Song" featured on Robbie Robertson's album Music for The Native Americans. Their video "Follow Your Hearts Desire" won "Best Music Video" at The American Indian Film Institute Awards. Ulali has appeared on National Public Radio several times and made their national television debut when they performed with Robertson as featured guests on The Tonight Show with Jay Leno. After performing at the Todos un Cantos del Mundo in May 2000, Ulali was featured on the "Jô Soares Show", a nationally televised talk show in Brazil.

The group has been on several compilations that have been nominated for Juno Awards. Ulali participated in the Aboriginal Women's Voices Project and helped to develop songs for the Project, recording "Hearts of the Nations". They were also featured on the Smithsonian Folkways compilation recording "Heartbeat," and can be heard on dozens of albums, documentaries and movies. In addition, Ulali contributed the music for a recording with Lakota/Kiowa Apache Story Teller Dovie Thomason's "Lessons from the Animal People," which won the American Library Association's 1997 Editor's Choice Award and "Notable Recording Award". During Spring 2002, they were featured on the "1 Giant Leap" recording and MTV video.

Ulali has shared the bill with Buffy Sainte-Marie, Floyd Westerman, Miriam Makeba, John Trudell, the American Indian Dance Theatre, Sting, Richie Havens, the B-52's, Jackson Browne, Bonnie Raitt, Mary Chapin Carpenter and the Neville Brothers.

Pura Fé began her solo career with The Pura Fe Trio in 2005 and has continued to tour with Ulali. In April 2014, the group appeared together for the first time as the "Ulali Project" with Pura Fé, Jennifer Kreisberg, Charly Lowry and Layla Locklear. The group has performed several times since that formation, including at the People's Climate March in New York City.

The original members of Ulali reunited for a concert in 2021.

== Awards ==
They were awarded the Eagle Spirit Award while attending the 25th Annual American Indian Film Festival in San Francisco in 2000. They were one of several winners of the Native American Women's Recognition Award (NAWRE), presented by the Friends of Ganondagan in Rochester, New York. Their video "Follow Your Hearts Desire" won "Best Music Video" at The American Indian Film Institute Awards.

== Discography ==
- Mahk Jchi (Corn, Beans & Squash Records, 1994)

As Contributor:

- 1 Giant Leap (Palm Pictures, 2002)
- World Festival of Sacred Music - the Americas, Los Angeles (Bindu Records, 2000) song: "My People, My Land"
- Smoke Signals: Music from the Motion Picture Soundtrack (TVT, 1998)
- Weaving The Strands: Music By Contemporary Native American Women (Red Feather, 1998)
- Lessons from the Animal People (Yellow Moon Press, 1997)
- Tribal Voices: Songs from Native Americans (Earthbeat, 1996)
- Honor: A Benefit for the Honor the Earth Campaign (Daemon, 1996)
- Tribal Fires: Contemporary Native American Voices (Rhino, 1996)
- Legends Project: I am an Eagle (Curb Records, 1995)
- Heartbeat: Voices of First Nations Women (Smithsonian/Folkways, 1995) '
- Music for the Native Americans, Robbie Robertson (Capitol Records, 1994)
