= Pura Fé =

American singer

Pura Fé (Tuscarora/Taino), born Pura Fé Antonia "Toni" Crescioni, is a singer-songwriter, musician, story teller, instructor, seamstress, artist and a founding member of the Native Women's a cappella trio Ulali. In 2006 she received a Grand Prix du Disque for World Music from the Académie Charles Cros.

== Personal life ==
Pura Fé was born in New York City raised by her mother and maternal side of her family. They can count 9 generations of women singers that are sisters and cousins. Their long line tradition stems out of Sampson County, NC from the Blackwell family of women. The surname Blackwell stayed the same for 7 generations through the women, that kept their maternal line as North Carolina Tuscarora Deer Clan people that mixed with African and Scotch-Irish.

Her mother, Nanice Monk Lund, was a classically trained opera singer who toured with Duke Ellington and his Sacred Concert Series. Her father, Juan Antonio Crescioni-Collazo, was born in Maunabo, Puerto Rico and his mother Modesto Correa was Jibaro- Taíno and Spanish/Berber. His paternal Corsican immigrant grandparents migrated to Puerto Rico in the mid 1800s.

In New York City, Pura Fé was on the board of the American Indian Community House (AICH). She and other family members are involved in the NYC Urban Indian community network. This includes the Indigenous Permanent Forums at the United Nations and many functions and groups.

In 1997 after Pura Fé's Grandmothers passing she moved to North Carolina and worked with several related Native communities teaching youth and building song and dance groups, and worked with a Native woman's society that networked all their Tribal communities in Eastern Carolina and VA.

She brought her students from the "Seventh Generation Youth Group" under the "North Carolina Indian Cultural Center" to open for Ulali and later brought the Prospect Tuscarora Long House to perform annually at New Orleans Jazz and Heritage Festival, Merle Fest and travel up North to visit their Northern Haudenosaunee kin and communities with Ulali. Pura Fe won several awards for her cultural contributions.

In 2015 Pura Fé moved, married and lives in Northern Saskatchewan, Canada. She and her husband are raising 5 grand nieces and nephew in Cree-Dene territory. She has been working with several Native theater, dance theater groups and Native filmmakers, composing/recording music on several movie soundtracks and music videos for National Canadian TV and APTN. 2020 began a lot of online concerts, workshopping and interviews. In August 2021, the original Ulali came together after 15 years and sang at "Indian Market" in New Mexico on behalf of the Artist, Patrick Collins painting fund raiser and awareness of MMIW.

== Training ==
As an adolescent, Pura Fé studied and performed with the American Ballet Theatre, briefly trained at Martha Graham school and performed in Broadway musicals The Me Nobody Knows, Ari and Via Galactica. At the age of 22 Pura Fe sang with the Mercer Ellington Orchestra, opening for the Duke Ellington School in WA, DC, where she was given praise by Lena Horne and Danny Glover from the front row seats.

She attended a professional children's school for the Arts at Lincoln Square Academy in the late 1960s–73. Pura Fe worked as a waitress at club Max's Kansas City in New York during the Punk Era. Soon after, she began singing in bands and as a studio singer. She recorded jingles, commercials, backup and lead vocals on demos and the original recordings like "Good Enough", written by James McBride for Anita Baker.

== Career ==
In 1994, she was nominated and performed at the Juno Awards for Best Global Recording, for the album Condor Meets the Eagle by Kanatan Aski with Pura Fé. She released the CD, Mahk Jchi with Ulali on "Corn, Beans and Squash Music" and she appeared with Ulali on Robbie Robertson's Music for the Native Americans.

In 1995, she released her first solo album, the R&B-inspired Caution to the Wind, written and produced by James McBride, on Shanachie Records. She appeared on The Tonight Show with Jay Leno with Ulali and Robbie Robertson, debuting the Ulali song "Mahk Jchi (Heartbeat Drum Song)", which went platinum in Italy.

In 1996, she appeared and toured on The Indigo Girls' album Shaming of the Sun with Ulali.

She has appeared on many recordings and film soundtracks including the television series The Native Americans and The L-Word, and the films Smoke Signals, Rumble: The Indians Who Rocked the World, Falls Around Her and Bones of Crows.

After hearing guitarist Kelly Joe Phelps perform, Pura Fé began to play the acoustic lap slide guitar and recorded her second solo album, Follow Your Heart's Desire, released on the Music Maker label.

A year later, she opened for Neil Young in Berkeley, California, singing "Rise Up Tuscarora Nation" and "Find the Cost of Freedom". As a solo artist, she has also opened for Herbie Hancock, Taj Mahal, Al Jarreau, George Duke and Herbie Hancock.

Pura Fé won a NAMMY (Native American Music Award) for best female artist in 2006 and a French Grammy/Oscar, L'Académie Charles Cros Award for best world album.

Her third album, Hold The Rain, was released in 2007 with guitarist Danny Godinez.

In late 2009, she released Full Moon Rising for Dixiefrog Records and toured extensively throughout Europe.

Her fifth solo album, a live double CD, was released in the spring of 2011: A Blues Night in North Carolina.

2014 Pura Fé put out "Sacred Seed" on the French Label "Nueva Onda" Records and toured with her new Quartet. She currently performs internationally and working a lot in Canada writing music for Native Theater and Native Dance Troops as well as Film. She has been teaching a lot of vocal workshops.

In 2014, Pura Fé is invited by the French duo Antiquarks (Richard Monségu and Sébastien Tron) for a creation with the festival Les Détours de Babel. On the album KÔ, she performs the title Western Dark Side (2015, Label du Coin).

Pura Fe also appears in the 2017 Rezolution film documentary RUMBLE- The Indians that Rocked the World, which won at the Sundance Film Festival. It runs on APTN.

She is getting ready to record her next album "Blanket Dance" and "Canoe Journey" for 2022 release.

== Activism ==
Pura Fé has lent her voice to many environmental and Indigenous rights groups and campaigns. In 2013, she rowed in the Two Row Wampum Renewal Campaign canoe journey. In 2014, she participated in the Honor the Earth Love Water Not Oil Tour with Winona LaDuke to oppose the Enbridge expansions of the tar sands and fracked oil pipelines. She marched with Ulali Project in the front lines of the People's Climate March singing the song, "Idle No More," which she co-wrote with Cary Morin for the Idle No More movement.

Pura Fé and her cousin Jenn of Ulali went to Standing Rock to put on a concert fund raiser with Winona LaDuke and The Indigo Girls in support of the Water Protectors stopping the Pipeline. Pura Fé moved to North Carolina in the 1990s and volunteered to teach young people in the rural Indian communities of Robeson County, North Carolina. She won the Community Spirit Award from the First Peoples Fund of the Tides Foundation and later won its fellowship award for her volunteer contributions. She also won an award from Gonandagan in NY for her contributions.

== Discography ==
=== Albums ===
- Sacred Seed (Nueva Onda Records, 2015)
- Pura Fé Trio Live!: A Blues Night in North Carolina (Dixiefrog Records; Music Maker, 2011)
- Full Moon Rising (Dixiefrog Records, 2009)
- Hold The Rain (Dixiefrog Records, Music Maker 2007)
- Tuscarora Nation Blues (Dixiefrog Records, 2006) (European release of Follow Your Heart's Desire with two extra songs)
- Follow Your Heart's Desire (Music Maker, 2004)
- Mahk Jchi with Ulali (Corn, Beans & Squash Records, 1997)
- Caution to the Wind (Shanachie Records, 1995)

=== Side projects, contributions and collaborations ===
- Kô, Antiquarks, Richard Monségu, Sébastien Tron (Lyon, France – Label du Coin, Mustradem, InOuïe Distribution, 2015), book-album, collaboration on ‘’Western Dark Side”
- The Rough Guide to Native America (World Music Network, 2012), compilation
- The Voices – Women's Voices for Attawapiskat (Toronto, Canada, 2011), album, contributor, collaboration
- Diverse As This Land Volume II (Banff Centre, 2011), compilation
- Music Maker Revue – Live in Europe (Dixiefrog, 2011), compilation
- Deers R Us, Deer Clan Singers (Music Maker, 2011)
- Native American Calling – Music from Indian Country (Trikont, 2010), compilation
- Indian Rezervation Blues (Dixiefrog, 2009), compilation
- Dans La Tête D'Un Homme, Alexandre Kinn (Universal, 2008), collaboration
- Sisters of the South (Dixiefrog, 2008), contributor, compilation
- Drink House to Church House, Volume 2, DVD/CD set (Music Maker, 2007), contributor
- Blues Sweet Blues (Music Maker, 2007), contributor, compilation
- Only Breath, Jami Sieber (Out Front Music, 2007), contributor
- The Last & Lost Blues Survivors (Dixiefrog, 2005), contributor, compilation
- Speaking the Mamma Tongue, John McDowell (Raven, 2004), lead vocals on two songs: "Face the Wind" and "Oma Wani Yea"
- 1 Giant Leap (Palm Pictures, 2002), contributor
- Without Reservations, XIT (Warrior, 2002), guest appearance
- The Ghosts of St. Augustine, Tonemah (Red Sky, 2001), collaboration
- Always Be, Jeffrey Gaines (Artemis, 2001), background vocals
- World Festival of Sacred Music, the Americas, Los Angeles (Bindu Records, 2000), contributor
- Songs for Chiapas (Ra Records, 1999), compilation
- Smoke Signals soundtrack (Tvt, 1998), contributor
- Weaving The Strands: Music By Contemporary Native American Women (Red Feather, 1998)
- Haida: The Haida Way (Red Vinyl, 1998), background vocals
- ''Shaming of the Sun, Indigo Girls (Sony, 1997)
- Mirabal, Robert Mirabal (Warner Bros., 1997)
- Lessons from the Animal People (Yellow Moon Press, 1997)
- Tribal Fires: Contemporary Native American Voices (Rhino, 1996), contributor
- Honor: A Benefit for the Honor the Earth Campaign (Daemon, 1996), contributor
- Tribal Voices: Songs from Native Americans (Earthbeat, 1996), contributor
- Legends Project: I am an Eagle (Curb Records, 1995)
- Heartbeat: Voices of First Nations Women (Smithsonian/Folkways, 1995), contributor
- The Fire This Time: Dancing on John Wayne's Head (Extreme, 1995), compilation
- Music for the Native Americans, Robbie Robertson (Capitol Records, 1994)
- Condor Meets the Eagle with Kanatan Aski (Black Jaguar Productions, 1994)
- Maggie's Dream (Capitol Records, 1990), vocals on "Between Fear & Desire"
