= Music for The Native Americans =

Soundtrack album by Robbie Robertson
- Released: October 4, 1994
- Recorded: 1994
- Genre: Native American music, World music
- Length: 54:17
- Label: Capitol
- Producer: Robbie Robertson

Robbie Robertson chronology
Storyville (1991)	Music for The Native Americans (1994)	Contact from the Underworld of RedBoy (1998)

Professional ratings
Review scores
Source	Rating
AllMusic	3/5 stars
Rolling Stone	3/5 stars
Uncut	6/10

Music for The Native Americans is a 1994 album by Robbie Robertson, compiling music written by Robertson and other colleagues (billed as the Red Road Ensemble) for the television documentary film The Native Americans. The album was Robertson's first foray into writing music specifically inspired by his Mohawk heritage. Robertson brought in his son Sebastian Robertson to handle the drums on "Golden Feather", "Skinwalker", "It Is a Good Day to Die" and "Words of Fire, Deeds of Blood." His daughter Delphine Robertson sings backing vocals on "Coyote Dance."

== Track listing ==
The album is compiled as a soundtrack, being credited to a variety of musicians. Songs listed below are credited to Robertson unless otherwise specified.

1. "Coyote Dance" (Jim Wilson, Dave Pickell) – 4:07
2. Ulali: "Mahk Jchi (Heartbeat Drum Song)" (Pura Fé, Soni Moreno, Jennifer Kreisberg) – 4:17
3. "Ghost Dance" (Robertson, Wilson) – 5:12
4. "The Vanishing Breed" (Robertson, Douglas Spotted Eagle) – 4:39
5. "It Is a Good Day to Die" (Robertson) – 5:46
6. "Golden Feather" (Robertson) – 5:22
7. Kashtin: "Akua Tuta" (Florent Vollant, Claude McKenzie) – 4:51
8. "Words of Fire, Deeds of Blood" (Robertson) – 4:52
9. Walela (credited as Coolidge): "Cherokee Morning Song" (arranged by Robertson & Rita Coolidge) – 2:58
10. "Skinwalker" (Robertson, Patrick Leonard) – 5:56
11. Ulali and The Silvercloud Singers: "Ancestor Song" (Traditional, Fé, Moreno, Kreisberg) – 2:54
12. "Twisted Hair" (Wilson, Dave Carson) with Bonnie Jo Hunt – 3:23

== Charts ==
Chart performance for Music for The Native Americans
Chart (1995)	Peak position
Australian Albums (ARIA)	62
New Zealand Albums (RMNZ)	50
Swedish Albums (Sverigetopplistan)	23
