= 14th GLAAD Media Awards =

Annual US media awards ceremony

The 14th Annual GLAAD Media Awards (2003) were presented at three separate ceremonies: April 7 in New York; April 26 in Los Angeles; and May 31 in San Francisco. The awards were presented to honor "fair, accurate and inclusive" representations of gay individuals in the media.

== Special Recognition ==
- Vanguard Award - Eric McCormack
- Davidson/Valentini Award - BD Wong
- Vito Russo Award- Rosie O'Donnell
- Excellence in Media Award - Diane Sawyer
- Golden Gate Award - Stockard Channing
- Stephen F. Kolzak Award - Todd Haynes
- Special Recognition: Christina Aguilera

== Awards ==
Winners are presented in bold.

=== Film Awards ===
- Outstanding Film - Wide Release
  - Far From Heaven (Focus Features)
  - Frida (Miramax Films)
  - **The Hours** (Paramount Pictures)
  - The Rules of Attraction (Lions Gate Entertainment)
  - Sweet Home Alabama (Touchstone Pictures)
- Outstanding Film - Limited Release
  - 8 femmes (Focus Features)
  - Borstal Boy (Strand Releasing)
  - His Secret Life (Strand Releasing)
  - **Kissing Jessica Stein** (Fox Searchlight Pictures)
  - Y Tu Mamá También (IFC Films)

=== Television Awards ===
- Outstanding Drama Series
  - Once and Again (ABC)
  - Queer as Folk (Showtime)
  - The Shield (FX)
  - **Six Feet Under** (HBO)
  - The Wire (HBO)
- Outstanding Comedy Series
  - Sex and the City (HBO)
  - **Will & Grace** (NBC)
- Outstanding Individual Episode (in a series without a regular gay character)
  - "Guess Who's Coming to Dinner, Honey?" - George Lopez (ABC)
  - "My Own Private Rodeo" - King of the Hill (Fox)
  - **"Pararse" - Resurrection Blvd.** (Showtime)
  - "Relax!" - Grounded for Life (Fox)
  - "Scared Straight" - Crossing Jordan (NBC)
- Outstanding Television Movie or Mini-Series
  - The Badge (Starz!)
  - Bobbie's Girl (Showtime)
  - **The Laramie Project** (HBO)
  - The Matthew Shepard Story (NBC)
- Outstanding Documentary
  - Gay Weddings (Bravo)
  - Middle School Confessions (HBO)
  - Southern Comfort (HBO)
  - **Trembling Before G-d** (New Yorker Films)
  - True Life: I'm Coming Out (MTV)
- Outstanding Daily Drama
  - All My Children (ABC)
  - **Daniela** (Telemundo)
  - **Undressed** (MTV)
- Outstanding Talk Show
  - **"Adopted by Gay Parents" - The Rosie O'Donnell Show**
  - "Gays in Sports" - Donahue (MSNBC)
  - "Dolly Parton" - So Graham Norton (BBC America)
- Outstanding TV Journalism
  - "Coming Out" - Real Sports with Bryant Gumbel (HBO)
  - "Kantaras v. Kantaras" - CourtTV (CourtTV)
  - "A Matter of Choice?" - Nightline (ABC)
  - "Nick News Special Edition: My Family is Different" - Nick News with Linda Ellerbee (Nickelodeon)
  - **"Rosie's Story: For the Sake of the Children" - Primetime Thursday** (ABC)

=== Print ===
- Outstanding Magazine Article
  - **"About a Boy Who Isn't" by Benoit Denizet-Lewis** (The New York Times Magazine)
  - "Free and Clear" by Esera Tuaolo with Luke Cyphers (ESPN The Magazine)
  - "Indian Gays Step Out" by Kavita Chhibber Narula (Little India [Reading, Pa.])
  - "A Killing in Colorado" by Jon Barrett (Teen People)
  - "Mormon Family Values" by Katherine Rosman (The Nation)
- Outstanding Magazine Overall Coverage
  - AsianWeek
  - The Chronicle of Higher Education
  - National Catholic Reporter
  - **Teen People**
  - TV Guide
- Outstanding Newspaper Article
  - "Coming Out: Revelation Alters Daughter's Relationship with Folks" by Martha Irvine (The Associated Press)
  - **"Dos Madres para un Hogar (Two Mothers in One Household)" by Patricia A. Gonzalez-Portillo**, (La Opinión [Los Angeles])
  - "Gay Muslims Face a Growing Challenge Reconciling Their Two Identities" by Robert F. Worth (The New York Times)
  - "Mauling Death Creates an Activist" by Anna Gorman (Los Angeles Times)
  - "Queer and Present Danger" by Ken Picard (Independent [Missoula, Mont.])
- Outstanding Newspaper Columnist
  - Margery Eagan (The Boston Herald)
  - Thomas Oliphant (The Boston Globe)
  - **Leonard Pitts, Jr.** (The Miami Herald)
  - Deb Price (The Detroit News)
  - Steve Rothaus (The Miami Herald)
- Outstanding Newspaper Overall Coverage
  - Atlanta Journal-Constitution
  - Chicago Tribune
  - Newsday
  - Orlando Sentinel
  - **USA Today**
- Outstanding Comic Book
  - The Authority (Wildstorm/DC Comics)
  - **Green Lantern** (DC Comics)
  - Murder Mysteries (Dark Horse Comics)
  - Strangers in Paradise (Abstract Studio)
  - X-Statix (Marvel Comics)

=== Digital ===
- Outstanding Digital Journalism Article
  - **"Fired for Being Gay" by Jennifer Barrett, Newsweek/MSNBC.com**
  - "The Gay Purge" by Cheryl L. Reed, Salon.com
  - "More Than Just Cross-Dressing: Identifying the Transgender Market" by Kipp Cheng, DiversityInc.com
  - "One Man's Tale" by Josh Hammer, Newsweek/MSNBC.com
  - "Sleeping with the Enemy" by Flore de Préneuf, Salon.com
- Outstanding Digital Journalism Overall Coverage
  - CourtTV.com
  - **Newsweek/MSNBC.com**
  - Salon.com

=== Music & Theater ===
- Outstanding Music Album
  - Become You, Indigo Girls (Epic Records)
  - Cookie: The Anthropological Mixtape, Meshell Ndegeocello (Maverick Records)
  - Crucible, Halford (Sanctuary Records)
  - Release, Pet Shop Boys (Sanctuary Records)
  - **A Wonderful World, k.d. lang and Tony Bennett** (Sony Music)
- Outstanding Los Angeles Theater
  - The Big Voice: God or Merman?
  - A Cold Coming We Had of It
  - The Day I Stood Still
  - **Dementia**
  - Drama Club
- Outstanding New York Theater: Broadway and Off-Broadway
  - Elle
  - **The Goat, or Who Is Sylvia?**
  - Kilt
  - A Man of No Importance
  - Take Me Out
- Outstanding New York Theater: Off-Off-Broadway
  - A to B
  - Rhapsody in Seth
  - Single Wet Female
  - Spanked!
  - **Zanna, Don't!**
- Outstanding Washington DC Theater
  - **Corpus Christi**
  - Glory Box
  - Hedwig and the Angry Inch
  - The Laramie Project
  - Not As Cute As Picture
