= Phil Lucas =

American filmmaker (died 2007)

Phil Lucas (1942 – February 4, 2007) was an American filmmaker of mostly Native American themes. He was an actor, writer, producer, director and editor for more than 100 films/documentaries or television programs starting as early as 1979 when he wrote/co-produced and co-directed Images of Indians for PBS - a five-part series exploring the problem of Indian stereotypes as portrayed and perpetuated by Hollywood Westerns.

== Early life ==
Born in 1942 in Phoenix, Arizona, United States to the Choctaw Nation of Oklahoma, in his early twenties Lucas was a musician in New York but giving up alcohol drove him to leave for Central America where he took up photography and worked for advertising agencies. In the early- to mid-1960s Lucas became a member of the Baháʼí Faith and contributed songs such as Mount Your Steeds, O Heroes of God! and World Citizen, among other songs on an LP record re-released as a CD Fire & Snow. He also spoke at least one Baháʼí Conference (see links below). Lucas returned to American West and took up filmmaking after surviving the 1972 earthquake in Managua, Nicaragua.

== Awards ==
Acclaimed as the "foremost (Native American) film documentarian" by Hanay Geiogamah, a professor of theater and American Indian studies at the University of California, Los Angeles, Lucas won some 18 awards or nominations from 1980 to 2003.

- 1994 The Native Americans, Emmy Award, Television Series
- 1999 Allan Houser/Haozous: The Lifetime Works of an American Master
  - Best Documentary, Santa Fe Film Festival, Santa Fe, NM.
  - Taos Mountain Award, Taos Talking Pictures Film Festival, Taos, NM.
  - Official Selection, Native Forum, Sundance Film Festival.
- 2002 Restoring the Sacred Circle won the Best Public Service Award at American Indian Film Festival in San Francisco.

As recently as 2003 Lucas won the CINE Eagle Award for Vis à Vis: Native Tongues.

== Films/television ==
Lucas worked on popular media as well as covering issues inside the Native American community. In 1979 he helped complete a set of documentaries covering Portrayal of Native Americans in film called "Images of Indians" with Robert Hagoplan. "Images of Indians" is a five-part series on the Indian stereotype portrayed in movies and questions the impact of Hollywood image on Indians' own self-image. In particular, Lucas and Hagoplan made the first of the series - "The Great Movie Massacre" - about the myth of the "savage Indian" vs Buffalo Bill and similar stories.

In 1987 he directed Honor of All about an Alkali Lake band of Indians in British Columbia who overcame decades of alcohol abuse which helped bring a national awareness of the problem of alcoholism among Indians. He used "interviews and dramatic reenactments from the 1986 two-tape documentary to create the 1992 film The Honour of All. "It began with their seven-year-old daughter telling them she didn't want to live with them anymore. Using interviews and dramatic reenactments, this 1986 two-tape documentary conveys the story of alcoholic Phyllis Chelsea and her husband Andy Chelsea, who stopped drinking and then led the Alkali Lake Indian Band on a years-long, but ultimately successful struggle out of alcoholism that had been devastating the community of the Shuswap Reserve in British Columbia."

Lucas played characters and served as a technical advisor on cultural content in popular TV series Northern Exposure (1990–1991) and MacGyver, as well as producing/writing/directing/editing many movies and documentaries. Lucas co-directed the 1993 American Indian Dance Theatre for PBS television series Great Performances/Dance in America. Also in 1993, Pierce Brosnan starred in The Broken Chain for TV and Lucas played a Mohawk character in a story about Iroquois' in the midst of the Revolutionary War. Again in 1993 Lucas produced, directed and wrote Healing the Nation a documentary on efforts of Nuu Chan-NuIth Nation on Vancouver Island to break the cycle of sexual abuse in their community. In 2003 in Vis à Vis: Native Tongues Lucas brought together an Australian Aboriginal artist and an American Indian performance artist. Married for over 25 yrs to Nancy Gross of Bellevue who, with Phil, produced 4 children: Amy, Jason, Jessy, and Sara. Lucas has one son from a previous marriage: Josh Lucas.

== Later life ==
Lucas eventually moved to Issaquah, Washington, and taught film at Bellevue Community College in Washington for the last eight years of his life. He began an American Indian Film Festival there in 2003. He died in Bellevue, Washington, and is survived by his fourth wife, Mary Lou, and five children.

== See also ==
- Baháʼí Faith and Native Americans
- Nipo T. Strongheart, another leading Native American associated with Hollywood, and a Baháʼí.
