= Red Solstice 2: Survivors =

2021 video game

- Developer: Ironward
- Publisher: 505 Games
- Writer: Hrvoje Horvatek
- Engine: Unreal Engine
- Platforms: Microsoft Windows; PlayStation 4; PlayStation 5; Xbox One; Xbox Series X and Series S
- Release: Microsoft Windows; June 17, 2021; Ultimate Edition (PS4, PS5, XONE, XSXS); January 23, 2025
- Genres: Survival, strategy
- Modes: Single-player, multiplayer

Red Solstice 2: Survivors is a real-time tactical video game developed by Ironward Games and published by 505 Games. It was released on June 17, 2021 for the PC platform. It is a direct sequel to the 2015 game The Red Solstice. On January 23, 2025, the game was released on consoles under Ultimate Edition, bundled with its downloadable content.

== Gameplay ==
The game is described as a tactical shooter from an isometric perspective in cramped corridors. It features 15 main missions and over 20 side missions.

== Reception ==
Red Solstice 2: Survivors received mixed reviews. On Metacritic, the Windows version of the game holds a score of 65/100 based on 17 reviews.
