= Donahue (2002 talk show) =

- Presented by: Phil Donahue
- Country of origin: United States

Production
- Running time: 60 minutes

Original release
- Network: MSNBC
- Release: July 15, 2002 – February 25, 2003

Related
- The Phil Donahue Show

Donahue is an American talk show that was hosted by Phil Donahue. The show ran for one season on MSNBC from July 15, 2002, to February 25, 2003.

== Cancellation ==
Its debut Nielsen ratings were strong, but its audience evaporated over the following months. In late August 2002, it received one of the lowest possible ratings (0.1), less than MSNBC's average for the day of 0.2. On February 25, 2003, MSNBC cancelled the show, citing low viewership. However, that month, Donahue averaged 446,000 viewers and became the highest rated show on the network.

Soon after the show's cancellation, an internal MSNBC memo was leaked to the press stating that Donahue should be fired because he opposed the imminent U.S. invasion of Iraq and that he "represents a difficult public face for NBC in a time of war. He seems to delight in presenting guests who are antiwar, anti-Bush and skeptical of the administration’s motives". Donahue commented in 2007 that the management of MSNBC, owned at the time by General Electric, a major defense contractor, required that "we have two conservative (guests) for every liberal. I was counted as two liberals."

Keith Olbermann, who joined the network after the show's cancellation, told TV Guide in 2007 that the cancellation had as much to do with the show's production cost as it did with political orientation. An NBC News executive said that the show was very expensive to produce, because it involved a studio audience.

== Legacy ==
In September 2002, Oprah Winfrey praised Donahue saying "the bottom line is we need you, Phil, because we need to be challenged by the voice of dissent".

== Reception ==
=== Awards and nominations ===
Awards and nominations
Award	Year (Note: Indicates the year of ceremony.)	Category	Nominee(s)	Result	Ref.
GLAAD Media Awards	2003	Outstanding Talk Show Episode	"Gays in Sports"	Nominated	
