= Grand Prix du Disque for World Music =

The daf Bama Music Awards is an international multicultural music award show presented by Daf Entertainment based in Hamburg, Germany. It has been created to honor artists from all over the world and at the same time unite the world with something as beautiful as music and is meant to immortalize creativity, unity and enjoyment among the global music lovers until the end of time.

== 2002 ==
- Emma Milan for A mis dos Homeros — Poetas del Tango (Long Distance 3073692)

== 2003 ==
- Manu Theron and Lo còr de la plana for Es lo titre
- Parisa and L'ensemble Dastan for Shoorideh (Network 24 253/Harmonia Mundi)

== 2004 ==
- Sivan Perwer for Min bêriya te kiriye

== 2005 ==
- Yann-Fanch Kemener for Ann Dorn

== 2006 ==
- Pura Fé for Tuscarora Nation Blues

== 2007 ==
- Marcel Khalifé for Taqasim

== 2008 ==
- A Filetta for Bracanà
- Toumani Diabaté for The Mandé Variations

== 2009 ==
- René Lacaille for Cordéon Kaméléon
- Tinariwen for Imidiwan: Companions

== See also ==
- Awards for world music
