= Shame on You (Indigo Girls song) =

Single by Indigo Girls

from the album Shaming of the Sun
- Released: 1997
- Genre: Folk rock
- Length: 4:01
- Label: Epic
- Songwriter: Amy Ray

"Shame on You" is a single from the Indigo Girls album Shaming of the Sun released in 1997. The song's lyrics celebrate Chicano culture ("I go down to Chicano city park/cause it makes me feel so fine") and strongly criticize efforts against illegal immigration as being racist ("The white folks like to pretend it's not/but their music's in the air") and hypocritical ("They say we be looking for illegal immigrants/can we check your car/I say you know it's funny I think we were on the same boat/back in 1694").

Steve Earle sings backup and plays harmonica on the song.

The song was inspired by filmmaker David Zeiger's documentary Displaced in the New South.
