= Come On Now Social =

Studio album by Indigo Girls
- Released: September 28, 1999
- Recorded: 1999
- Genre: Folk rock
- Length: 57:20
- Label: Epic
- Producer: John Reynolds

Indigo Girls chronology
Shaming of the Sun (1997)	Come On Now Social (1999)	Become You (2002)

Singles from Come On Now Social
- 1. "Go"; 2. "Peace Tonight"; 3. "Cold Beer and Remote Control"

Professional ratings
Review scores
Source	Rating
Allmusic	4/5 stars
The A.V. Club	(mixed)
Entertainment Weekly	B+
The Music Box	3/5 stars
People	(favorable)
Q	3/5 stars
Rolling Stone	3.5/5 stars

Come On Now Social is the seventh studio album by the Indigo Girls, released in 1999.

== Track listing ==
1. "Go" (Amy Ray) – 4:05
2. "Soon Be to Nothing" (Emily Saliers) – 4:29
3. "Gone Again" (Ray) – 3:27
4. "Trouble" (Saliers) – 4:51
5. "Sister" (Ray) – 4:58
6. "Peace Tonight" (Saliers) – 4:11
7. "Ozilline" (Ray) – 4:43
8. "We Are Together" (Saliers) – 3:25
9. "Cold Beer and Remote Control" (Saliers) – 4:17
10. "Compromise" (Ray) – 2:50
11. "Andy" (Saliers) – 4:01
12. "Faye Tucker" (Ray) – 12:01
  - Includes a brief outtake of "Sister" and the song "Philosophy of Loss" (Saliers) as hidden tracks.

The song "Go" has a spoken passage inspired by Meridel Le Sueur's "I Was Marching".
