= The Native Americans =

- Genre: Documentary
- Directed by: John Borden; Phil Lucas; George Burdeau
- Narrated by: Joy Harjo
- Country of origin: United States
- Original language: English
- No. of seasons: 1
- No. of episodes: 3

Production
- Executive producer: Jonathan Taplin

Original release
- Network: TBS
- Release: October 10 – October 13, 1994

The Native Americans is a three-part American television documentary miniseries that premiered on TBS on October 10, 1994. The remaining two episodes aired on October 11 and 13, 1994. Directed by John Borden, Phil Lucas and George Burdeau, the six-hour series explores the history of Native American cultures, with each hour of the series devoted to a particular region of the United States.

Music for the series was composed by Robbie Robertson in collaboration with other Native American and Canadian First Nations musicians (as well as musicians who self-identify as Indigenous), including Ulali, Rita Coolidge, Douglas Spotted Eagle and Kashtin, and was released on the album Music for The Native Americans.
