= The Red Solstice =

2014 video game

- Developer: Ironward
- Publisher: Ironward
- Writer: Hrvoje Horvatek
- Engine: Razor engine
- Platform: Microsoft Windows
- Release: July 10, 2015
- Genres: Tactical shooter, survival
- Modes: Single-player, multiplayer

The Red Solstice is a tactical shooter, survival game, developed and published by Ironward for Windows. It entered early access in July 2014 and released on 10 July 2015. It is the first installment in The Red Solstice video game series. The Red Solstice had been in development for two and a half years. It uses an Ironward-created game engine, Razor.

A century after leaving Earth, a storm rages across the surface of Mars. Although terraforming is well under way, the alignment of the Martian northern winter solstice with the planet's closest approach to the Sun still triggers global dust storms sometimes lasting up to several weeks. During an exceptionally violent storm dubbed "The Red Solstice", the human colonies of Mars lose all contact with Tharsis, the colony referred to as "The Capital". Soldiers in the service of the Elysium Corporation, elite marine troops, were sent to find out what happened to the colony.

== Gameplay ==
The gameplay of The Red Solstice is mostly team-based tactical shooting. It has a 1-8 players co-op. The game also has a variety of equipment and features. Playing well rewards different achievements and ranks. The Red Solstice also features an ailment system in which characters can bleed, become poisoned, or be affected by various ailments, creating a new and harder experience. The Red Solstice has various character classes ranging from heavy combat to support. Modules and armor pieces can be changed on marines to alter their stats ranging from ganging abilities to accuracy and speed.

The main campaign focuses on a marine called Tyler Hunt and his squad. They are sent to investigate a communications failure in the Tharsis colony, located on Mars. This portion of the game has a story that expands over to the multiplayer mode and provides information for every class.

== Reception ==
The Red Solstice received mixed reviews on Metacritic. Britton Peele of GameSpot said that bugs and a poor tutorial make The Red Solstice difficult to get into, but it is rewarding if people stick with it and have friends interested in playing it with them.

== Sequel ==
A sequel, Red Solstice 2: Survivors, was released on 17 June 2021 on Windows.
