= Shaming of the Sun =

Studio album by Indigo Girls
- Released: April 29, 1997
- Recorded: September 1996–1997
- Genre: Folk rock
- Length: 50:49
- Label: Epic
- Producer: Indigo Girls with David Leonard

Indigo Girls chronology
1200 Curfews (1995)	Shaming of the Sun (1997)	Come On Now Social (1999)

Singles from Shaming of the Sun
- 1. "Shame on You"; 2. "Get Out the Map"; 3. "Shed Your Skin"

Professional ratings
Review scores
Source	Rating
Allmusic	3/5 stars
Chicago Tribune	2.5/4 stars
Entertainment Weekly	B
Los Angeles Times	2/4 stars
The Music Box	4/5 stars
Rolling Stone	2/5 stars

Shaming of the Sun, sometimes mislabeled as Shaming the Sun, is the sixth studio album by the Indigo Girls, released on April 29, 1997. It was the duo's highest-charting album in the US, peaking at number seven on the Billboard 200.

== Track listing ==
1. "Shame on You" (Amy Ray) – 4:04
2. "Get Out the Map" (Emily Saliers) – 3:25
3. "Shed Your Skin" (Ray) – 4:10
4. "It's Alright" (Saliers) – 3:05
5. "Caramia" (Saliers) – 5:48
6. "Don't Give That Girl a Gun" (Ray) – 4:38
7. "Leeds" (Saliers) – 3:34
8. "Scooter Boys" (Ray) – 2:57
9. "Everything in Its Own Time" (Saliers) – 5:17
10. "Cut It Out" (Ray) – 3:53
11. "Burn All the Letters" (Saliers) – 4:09
12. "Hey Kind Friend" (Ray) – 5:49

== Personnel ==
- Amy Ray – lead & backing vocals; acoustic, electric & 12-string guitars; mandolin; piano (7, 10); bouzouki
- Emily Saliers – lead & backing vocals, acoustic & electric guitars, dulcimer (12), banjo (1, 2), Dobro (4), piano (7, 10), harmonium, hurdy-gurdy

Additional musicians

- Sara Lee – bass (except 7, 11), string arrangements (5), Hammond B-3 organ and whistle (12)
- Jerry Marotta – drums, percussion (1, 2, 4, 5, 9 11), harmonium (9), Taos drum (1)
- Steve Earle – backing vocals & harmonica (1)
- Dallas Austin, Jama Carter, Quentin Bush (all 2), Michelle Malone (8) – backing vocals
- Carmen Caballero, Pura Fé Crescioni and Jennifer Kreisberg (Ulali) – additional vocals (3, 7, 11)
- Josh Freese, Chris Verene – drums (3, 6)
- Kenny Greenberg – guitars (5, 10)
- Michael Lorant – backing vocals (6), piano (10)
- Andy Stochansky – drums (8, 10), percussion (5, 8), dumbek and talking drum (11)
- Lisa Germano – mandolin (9), violin (9, 11)
- Sheila Doyle, Michael Lorant, Candy Jiosne – piano (10)
- Dave Richards – acoustic bass (11)
- David & Ellie Arenz, Jun-Ching Lin, Willard Shull, Sou-Chun Su – violin
- Paul Murphy, Heidi Nitchie – viola
- Kristin Wilkinson – conductor
- Micky Raphael – harmonica (11)

Smoke (track 12)

- Benjamin: words, friend
- William W Taft: coronet, humor
- Timothy P Campion: drums, rake
- Coleman T Lewis: electric guitar, hick sounds
- Brian F Halloran: cello, rescue

Technical personnel

- Produced By David Leonard & Indigo Girls
- Engineers: Caram Costanzo, Marc Frigo, David Leonard
- Assistant Engineers: Alex Lowe, Ryan Williams
- Mixing: David Leonard
- Mastering: Bob Ludwig
