= Iowa Highway 15 =

State highway in Iowa, United States

Iowa Highway 15
- Iowa 15 highlighted in red

Route information
- Maintained by Iowa DOT
- Length: 63.578 mi (102.319 km)
- Existed: 1969–present

Major junctions
- South end: Iowa 3 / CR N65 near Pocahontas
- US 18 near Whittemore; Iowa 9 at Armstrong
- North end: MN 15 north of Armstrong

Location
- Country: United States
- State: Iowa
- Counties: Pocahontas; Humboldt; Palo Alto; Kossuth; Emmet

Highway system
- Iowa Primary Highway System; Interstate; US; State; Secondary; Scenic
← Iowa 14	→ Iowa 15

Iowa Highway 15 (Iowa 15) is a north–south state highway in northern Iowa. It is 63 1/2 miles (102.2 km) long. The southern end of Iowa 15 is 7 miles (11 km) east of Pocahontas at an intersection with Iowa Highway 3. The northern end is at the Minnesota border, where the highway continues north as Minnesota State Highway 15 near Fairmont, Minnesota. Prior to 1969, the route was known as Iowa Highway 44; it was renumbered to match the highway in Minnesota.

== Route description ==
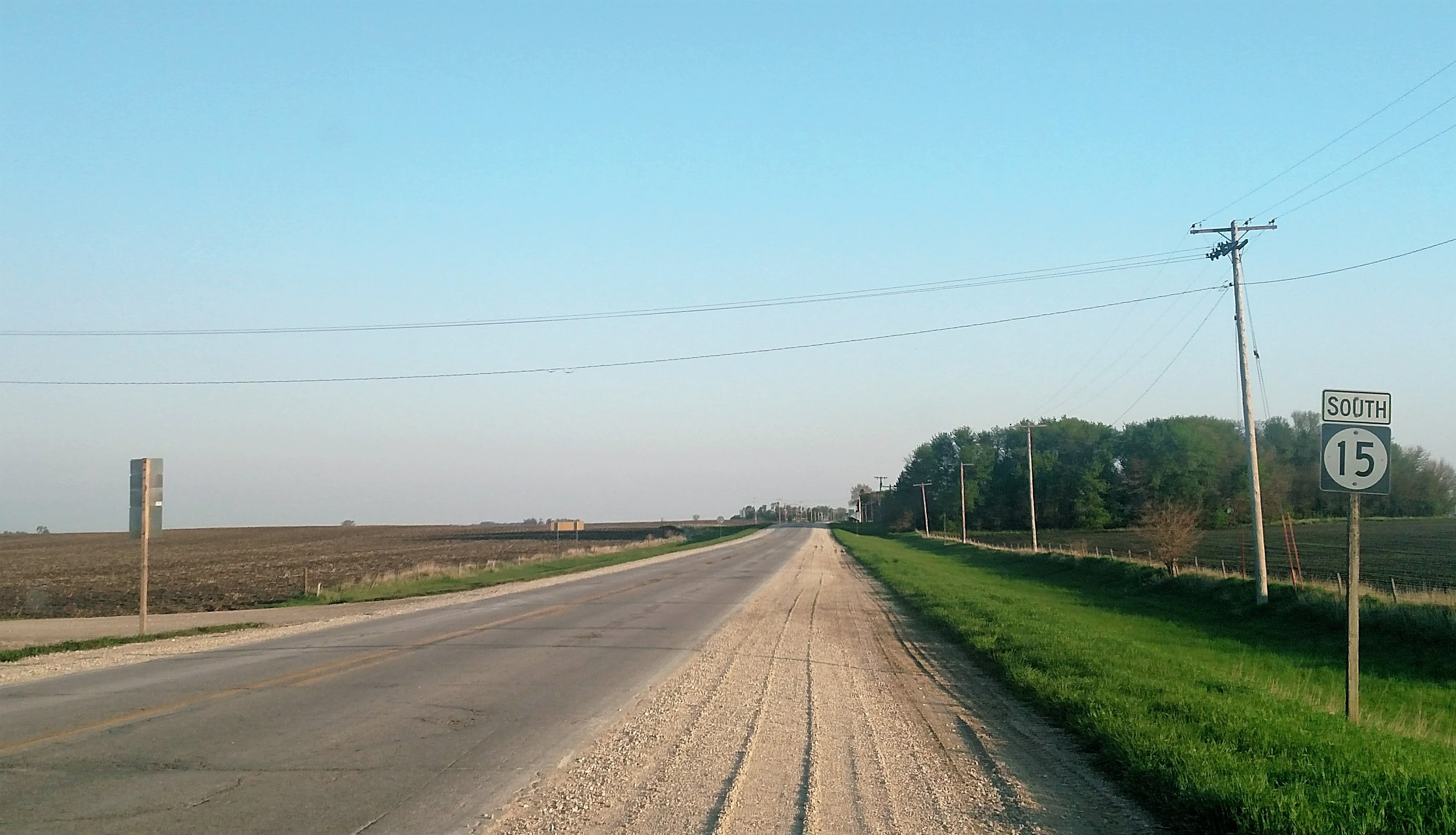
Highway 15 in Rolfe

Iowa Highway 15 begins 7 miles (11 km) east of Pocahontas at Iowa Highway 3. It goes north for 5 miles (8.0 km) to Rolfe, then begins to go northeast in a stairstep manner for 9 miles (14 km) until crossing the West Fork of the Des Moines River and into Humboldt County 3 miles (4.8 km) west of Ottosen. It then turns north onto the Palo Alto County/Kossuth County border for 4 1/2 miles (7.2 km) and passes through West Bend. It continues north for 8 1/2 miles (13.7 km) to the Whittemore area, where there is a one-mile (1.6 km) overlap with U.S. Route 18, where it fully enters Kossuth County.

It goes north 9 miles (14 km) to Fenton, continues north for 6 miles (9.7 km), and then turns west for 3 miles (4.8 km), where it enters Emmet County. Near Ringsted, it turns north again for 6 1/2 miles (10.5 km) and meets Iowa Highway 9 in Armstrong. Iowa 9 and Iowa 15 overlap each other for two blocks before Iowa 15 turns north into Armstrong. Highway 15 leaves Armstrong to the east; 3 miles (4.8 km) east of town, it turns north and ends at the Minnesota border 7 miles (11 km) later.

== History ==
Parts of what is now Iowa Highway 15 were originally primary roads designated in 1926. Primary Road 44 extended from Primary Road 10, now Iowa Highway 3 to Rolfe, while Primary Road 43 extended from Armstrong to the Minnesota state line. By 1947, Iowa Highway 44 had been created along the same route Iowa 15 now occupies. In 1969, then-Iowa Highway 44 was redesignated as Iowa Highway 15 to match Minnesota State Highway 15 at the state line.

== Major intersections ==
County	Location	mi	km	Destinations	Notes
Pocahontas	Lake–Garfield township line	0.000	0.000	Iowa 3 / CR N65 – Gilmore City, Pocahontas, Manson	Southern terminus
Humboldt	No major junctions				
Palo Alto–Kossuth county line	Fern Valley–Fairfield– Whittemore–Lotts Creek township quadripoint	29.412	47.334	US 18 west – Emmetsburg	Southern end of US 18 overlap
Kossuth	Whittemore–Lotts Creek township line	30.400	48.924	US 18 east / CR P16 south – Whittemore, Algona	Northern end of US 18 overlap
Emmet	Armstrong	54.675	87.991	Iowa 9 west – Estherville	Southern end of IA 9 overlap
Emmet	Armstrong	54.790	88.176	Iowa 9 east – Swea City	Northern end of IA 9 overlap
Emmet	Iowa Lakes Township	63.578	102.319	MN 15 – Fairmont	Continuation into Minnesota
1.000 mi = 1.609 km; 1.000 km = 0.621 mi: Concurrency terminus
