= April 2011 Iowa tornadoes =

Regional tornado event in Iowa, USA

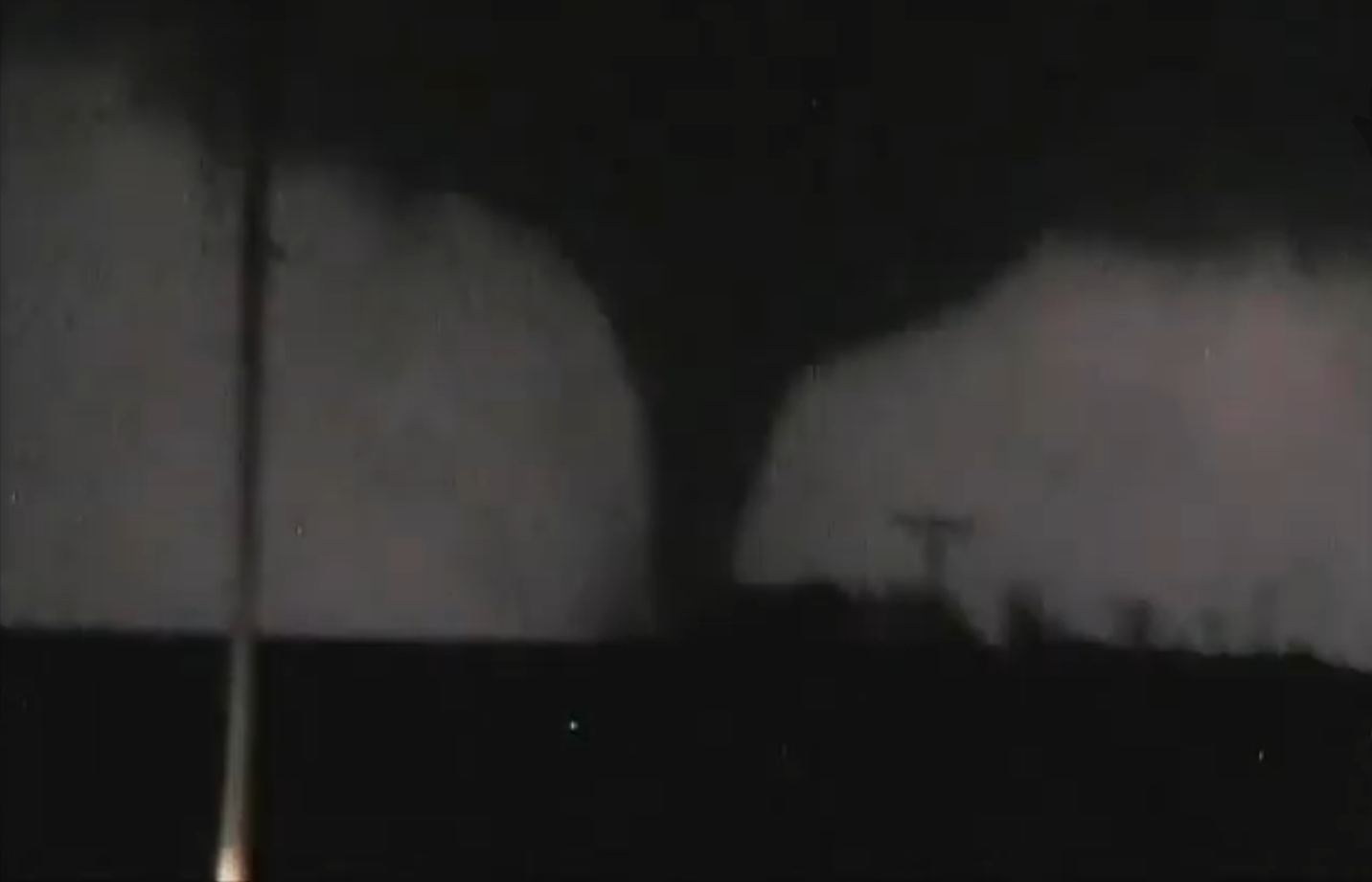
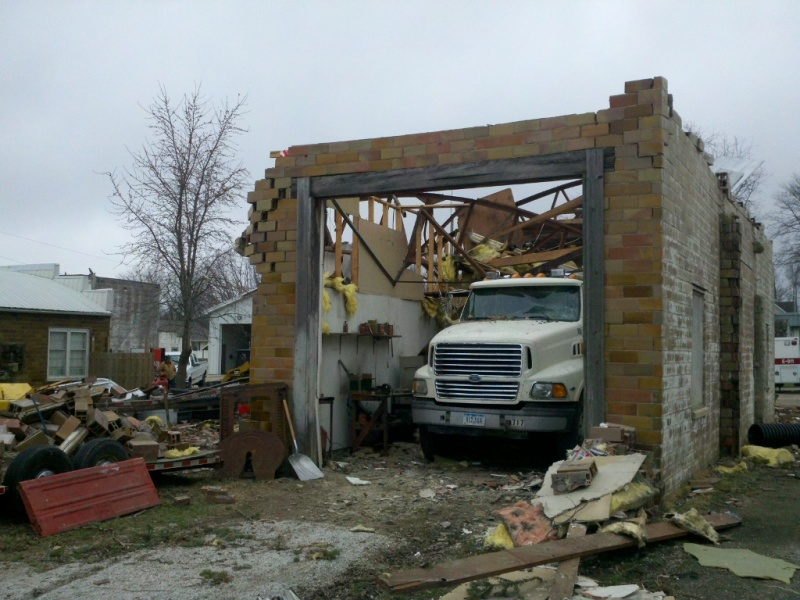
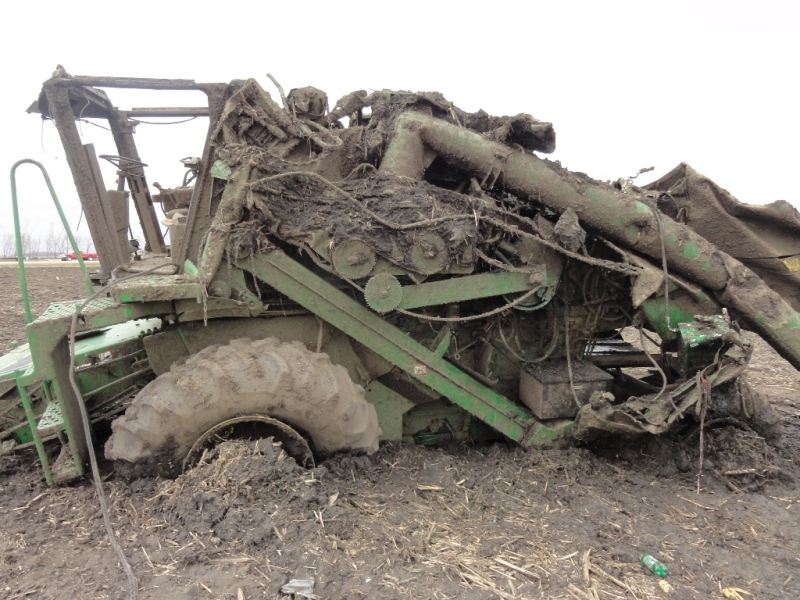
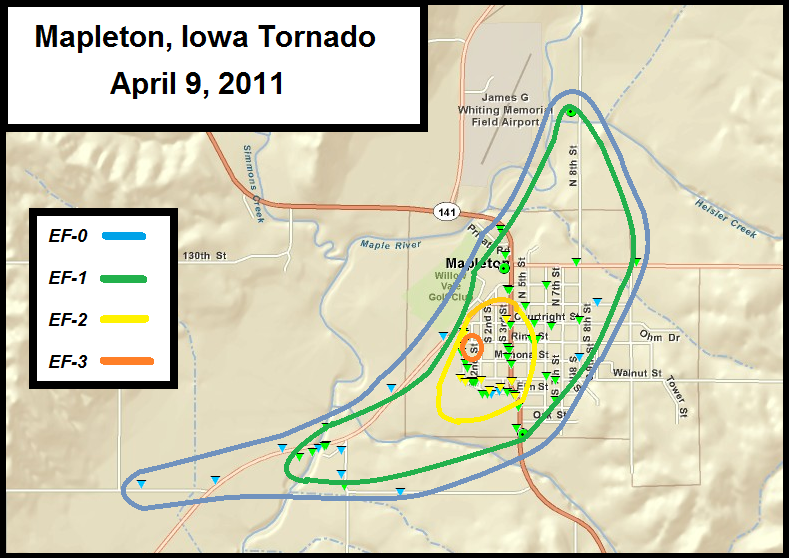
- Clockwise from the top: One of the tornadoes seen in rural Sac County, a Next-Generation Radar loop of storms across eastern Nebraska and western Iowa, a National Weather Service damage map of Mapleton after the EF3 tornado, a combine harvester that was severely mangled by an EF4 tornado near Pocahontas, a house largely collapsed at EF2 intensity in Early.

Meteorological history
- Date: April 9, 2011
- Duration: 7:20 PM – 11:21 PM CDT (UTC-05:00)

Tornado family
- Tornadoes: 20 confirmed
- Max. rating: EF4 tornado
- Duration: 4 hours, 1 minute
- Highest winds: 170 mph (270 km/h) (Pocahontas, Iowa EF4 tornado)

Overall effects
- Fatalities: 0
- Injuries: 14
- Damage: $19.576 million (2011 USD)
- Areas affected: Monona, Crawford, Ida, Sac, Buena Vista, Pocahontas and Kossuth Counties, Iowa, United States; primarily near or in Mapleton, Arthur, Schaller, Early, Varina, Ware and Pocahontas (City)
- Part of the Tornado outbreak of April 9–11, 2011 and tornado outbreaks of 2011

On April 9, 2011, supercell thunderstorms produced several tornadoes across northwestern Iowa, causing extensive damage across the region. The tornadoes were part of an outbreak that occurred from April 9–11, which affected large parts of the central and eastern United States, and occurred as part of a record-breaking monthly season. (Note: The citation only lists the preliminary total of tornadoes. The confirmed total was 782 tornadoes from April 4 to April 30.) These tornadoes contributed significantly to Iowa's above-average, but non-lethal season in 2011, according to an experienced climatologist. According to a report published by the National Weather Service in Des Moines, April 9, 2011 was tied with May 22, 2004 as the fifth most active day for tornadoes in Iowa ever since.

Within the state, one storm put down a family that consisted of at least 10 tornadoes, (Note: This is referenced by citation []. It lists tornadoes in alphabetical order and how tornadoes formed one after another or were satellites in the NWS Des Moines, Iowa forecasting region.) several of them were strong to violent (EF2–EF4) tornadoes that impacted communities and farmsteads from Monona County, to Kossuth County. One large and damaging EF3 tornado struck the city of Mapleton, causing over a dozen injuries and widespread damage. After dusk, another impactful EF2 tornado hit the city of Early and compromised buildings in town. During the later evening hours, an intense, long-lived and massive EF3 tornado tracked across Sac, Buena Vista and Pocahontas Counties, causing severe damage to several farmhouses and eventually the small communities of Varina and Ware. That tornado spawned approximately five satellite tornadoes, including one brief but powerful EF4 tornado that completely destroyed a farmstead west of Pocahontas (City).

== Meteorological synopsis ==
=== Episode narrative ===
==== One day prior ====
SPC outlooks on April 9, 2011. (Note: The "z" timestamp indicators refer to Zulu military time zones, named after the NATO phonetic alphabet. Zulu time zones are equal to Universal Coordinated Time.)

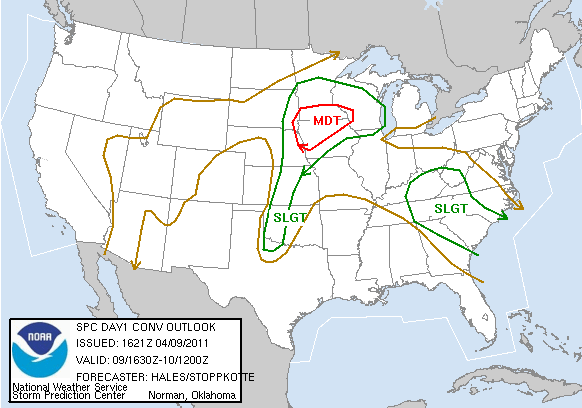
Day 1 1630z categorical outlooks.

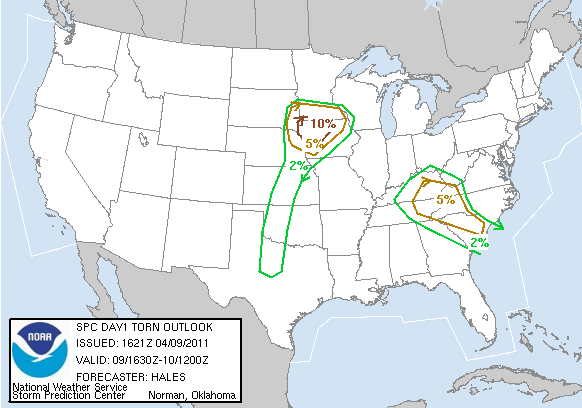
Day 1 1630z tornado outlooks.

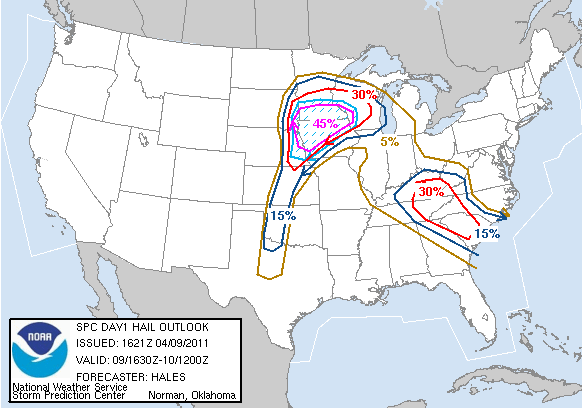
Day 1 1630z hail outlooks.

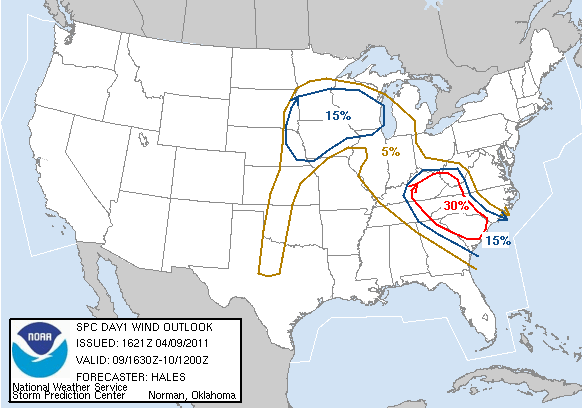
Day 1 1630z wind outlooks.

At 1:00 AM CDT (06:00 UTC) on April 8, 2011, the NOAA Storm Prediction Center (SPC) outlined a slight risk for severe weather across portions of the Great Plains and Midwest, from northern Oklahoma to central Wisconsin, and including nearly the entire state of Iowa. Accompanying the slight risk was a 30% hatched (Note: Hatched risks refer to a generally 10% chance of significant severe weather events taking place within 25 miles (40 km) of any set point in the forecasted area of risk.: For tornadoes, it could mean for those of EF2 strength or stronger.; For thunderstorms wind gusts, it could be interpreted for hurricane-force winds of 74 miles per hour (119 km/h) or higher.; For hail, a diameter of 2 inches (5.1 cm) or greater is guaranteed to likely occur.) probability over northwestern Iowa, eastern Nebraska, southeastern Minnesota, and southwestern Wisconsin. An upper-level trough was forecasted to move over the Intermountain West and into the Four Corners region, with a low-level jet expected to strengthen over an environment with strong and favorable wind shear and sufficient atmospheric instability in the south-central United States. At 12:30 PM CDT (17:30 UTC), the NOAA SPC updated the outlook to move the 30% probability further into Wisconsin and Minnesota, with the 30% hatched probability and a 15% hatched probability encompassing the majority of central and northwestern Iowa.

==== Day of the event ====
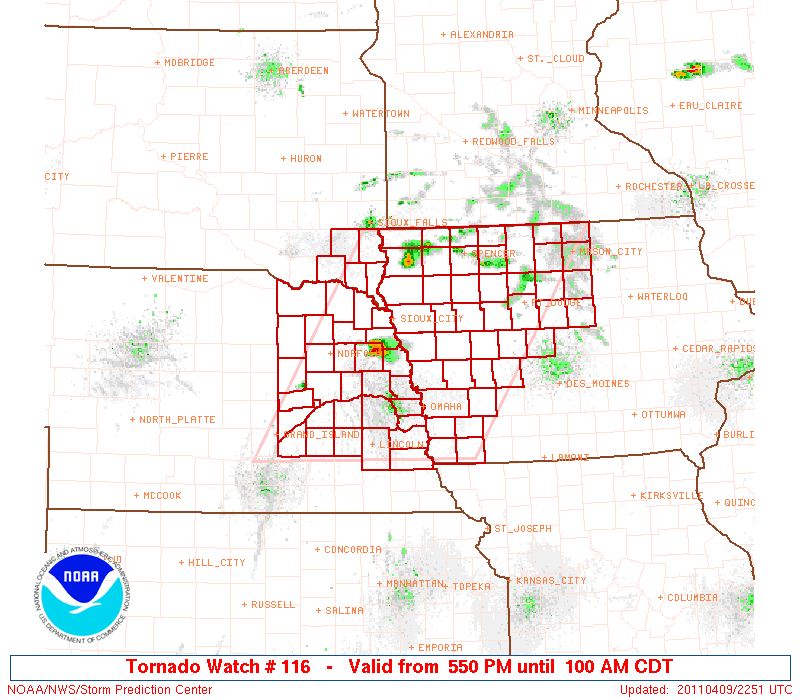
Tornado watch issued for portions of eastern Nebraska, western Iowa and southeastern South Dakota on April 9.

At 1:00 AM CDT (06:00 UTC) on April 9, the NOAA SPC upgraded to a moderate risk for severe weather centered over northern Iowa and southern Minnesota, with a 10% hatched (EF2–EF5) probability of tornadoes over northwestern portions of Iowa as the major western trough was expected to track eastward alongside a powerful jet stream moving northeastward across the High Plains towards the Mississippi Valley. A surface low-pressure area was expected to deepen across northeast Nebraska by that evening, alongside strong southernly low-level winds bringing moist and potentially very unstable air from the Gulf of Mexico into the region, with expected Mixed Layer Convective Available Potential Energy (MLCAPE) values of 2000-3000 J/KG. At 8:00 AM CDT (13:00 UTC), the SPC removed the hatched area from northwestern Iowa, while maintaining the 10% probability of tornadoes. A surface low was deepening over Colorado during the morning hours, and was expected to track east-northeastward into South Dakota and Nebraska by the evening. A strong capping inversion was likely to be present, limiting the number of storms that could form. It was predicted that any storms that formed along the warm front had the greatest chance of producing tornadoes during the late afternoon and evening hours. At 11:30 PM CDT (16:30 UTC), the Storm Prediction Center extended the moderate risk for severe weather southward, covering the majority of northwestern Iowa as models were in agreement of storms developing along the eastern Nebraska/Iowa border by 7:00 PM CDT (00:00 UTC). The low-level jet was expected to strengthen and bring additional warm and moist air into the region as the night progressed, resulting in an expansion of the area where severe storms could develop. Alongside the maintained 10% probability for tornadoes within 25 miles (40 km) of a point, a 15% probability of damaging thunderstorm winds over Iowa, Wisconsin, and southern Minnesota, with a 45% hatched probability of hail over 2 in (5.1 cm) covering northwestern Iowa and southern Minnesota.

=== Event narrative ===
At 5:50 PM CDT (22:50 UTC) on April 9, a tornado watch was issued for portions of northwestern Iowa, northeastern Nebraska, and the southeastern corner of South Dakota, with a high chance of tornadoes but a low chance that those tornadoes are of EF2+ strength. As the day progressed, the low-level jet steadily strengthened, reaching 50–70 kn (58–81 mph; 93–130 km/h) by 12:00 AM CDT (05:00 UTC). Ample moisture advection led to dew points rising up to around 60 °F (16 °C) by the evening hours, and a powerful warm front moved into northern Iowa that afternoon, extending from western-central Iowa to eastern and southeastern portions of the state. An elevated mixed layer delayed storm development until the evening, allowing for atmospheric instability to build during the day, with elevated CAPE values reaching 3000–5000 J/kg. Strong shear of 60–65 kn (69–75 mph; 111–120 km/h) was also present, along with downdraft CAPE values of 1000 J/kg and helicity values in the lower levels of the atmosphere reaching 800 J/kg. Several discrete storms formed along the warm front during the late afternoon and evening hours, producing various tornadoes in western and northwestern Iowa, with three being intense (EF3+) and one being violent (EF4+).

== Tornado summaries ==
Confirmed tornadoes by Enhanced Fujita rating
EFU	EF0	EF1	EF2	EF3	EF4	EF5	Total
0	4	8	4	3	1	0	20

=== Mapleton, Iowa ===
Mapleton, Iowa
- The tornado near Mapleton

Meteorological history
- Formed: April 9, 2011; 7:20 PM CDT (UTC−05:00)
- Dissipated: April 9, 2011; 7:26 PM CDT (UTC−05:00)
- Duration: 6 minutes

EF3 tornado
- on the Enhanced Fujita scale
- Highest winds: 140 mph (230 km/h)

Overall effects
- Fatalities: 0
- Injuries: 14

==== The first tornado ====
Prior to the first tornado of the evening in Iowa on April 9, a tornado warning was issued by the National Weather Service in Omaha, Nebraska at 7:08 PM CDT (12:08 UTC) for northeastern Monona County. Approximately 12 minutes later, a tornado touched down 1.84 miles (2.96 km) southwest of Mapleton, Iowa.

This large, powerful and dusty tornado began at EF0 intensity, near IA 175. The tornado then steadily increased to EF1 intensity as it moved along the highway, just a few minutes before impacting the southwest side of Mapleton. Trees along this stretch of the highway were snapped or uprooted as the tornado encroached on the Maple River.

==== Direct hit and widespread damage ====
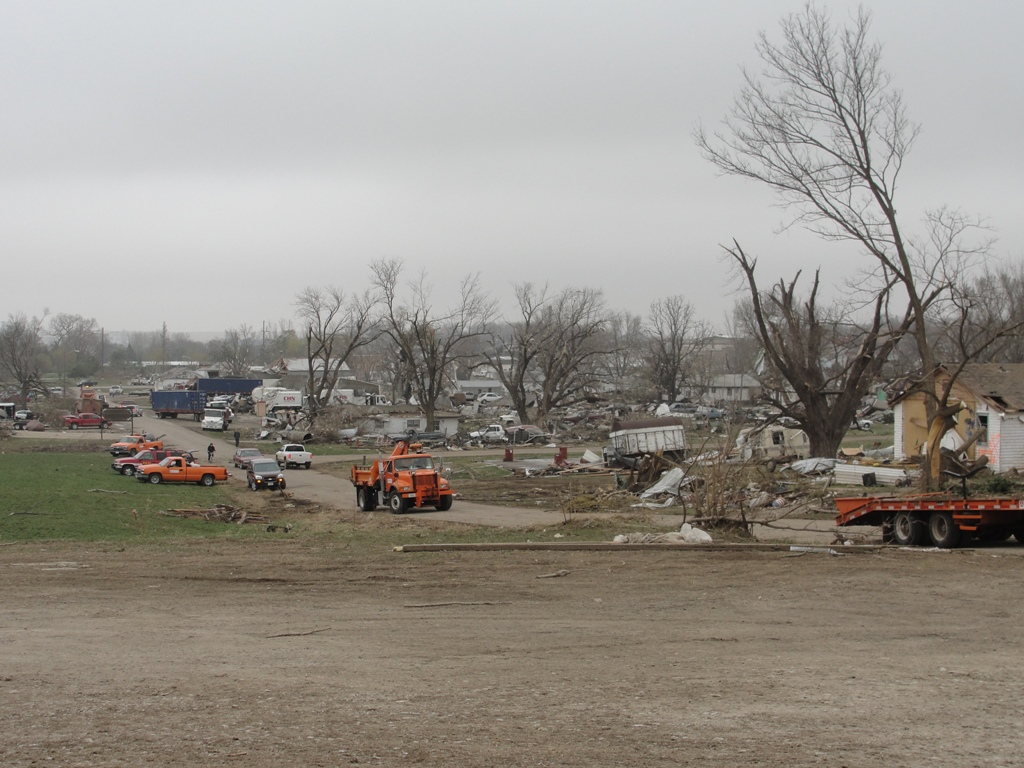
View of the damage in town.

After causing another instance of EF0 tree damage along 1st Street, the tornado intensified further and entered the city, causing EF2 damage to multiple metal buildings, with many of them buckling and collapsing as the winds passed through. Along South 1st Street, the tornado caused one localized spot of EF3 damage, as a metal auto service was completely collapsed and destroyed, with the steel beams blown over to the next city block. Moving up through much of the center of town, a brick building in the main part of Mapleton, right on the northwestern side of the intersection of Courtright and South 4th Streets was collapsed at EF2 intensity, as the large and damaging wedge tornado went through downtown before weakening.

==== Endpoint after Mapleton ====
The tornado would exit the through the north side of the city, having only done EF1 damage to several structures and trees, before soon dissipating 1 mile (1.6 km) north of Mapleton.

The intense EF3 tornado that struck Mapleton, while despite not the strongest of the evening, was the most notable event of April 9. Widespread damage occurred by this large wedge tornado, which destroyed 100 homes. Residents before the tornado struck received early warning of, and thus has this resulted in no deaths and 14 insignificant injuries, though one person suffered from a broken leg. In all, this tornado tracked for 3.38 miles (5.44 km) and was up to 1,200 yards (1,100 m) wide at peak width. Much of the early warning was helped by storm chasers and spotters, giving many residents around 15 minutes of lead time to take cover before the tornado struck Mapleton.

=== Early, Iowa ===
Early, Iowa
- The EF2 tornado seen south of Early

Meteorological history
- Formed: April 9, 2011; 8:29 PM CDT (UTC−05:00)
- Dissipated: April 9, 2011; 8:54 PM CDT (UTC−05:00)
- Duration: 25 minutes

EF2 tornado
- on the Enhanced Fujita scale
- Highest winds: 132 mph (212 km/h)

Satellite tornadoes
- Tornadoes: 1 confirmed
- Max. rating: EF0 tornado
- Highest winds: 70 mph (110 km/h)

Overall effects
- Fatalities: 0
- Injuries: 0
- Damage: $1.001 million (2011 USD) (Parent and satellite tornado) (Note: You can find the combined monetary losses in the NCDC/NCEI Storm Event county reports for each tornado.)

==== Activity in Sac County ====
While a large and mile-wide (1.6 km) wedge EF3 tornado was ongoing in western Sac County after dusk settled, the parent storm which previously produced that tornado and the earlier Mapleton tornado, dropped another a strong tornado just north of Odebolt at 8:29 PM CDT (01:09 UTC).

==== EF2 tornado and satellite timeline ====
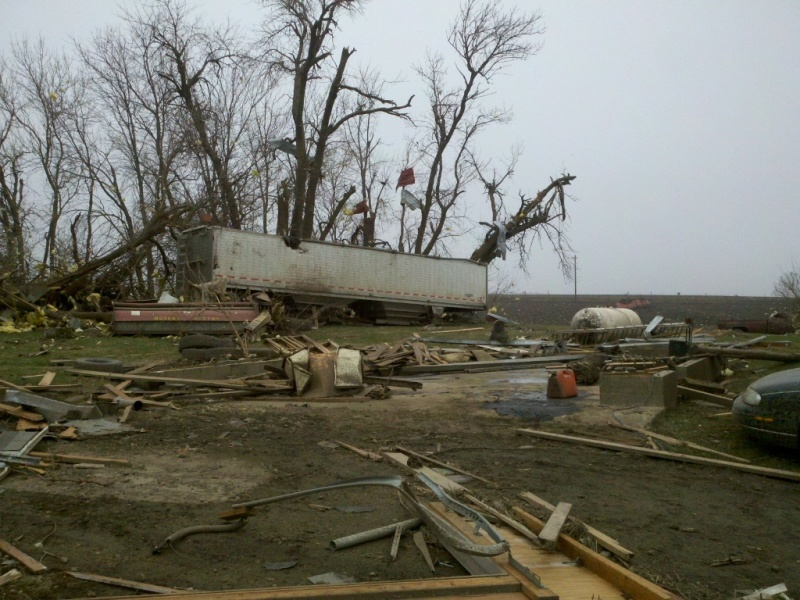
An impacted farmstead southwest of Early

Approximately six minutes after issued tornado warning by the National Weather Service office in Des Moines, Iowa for the area, and after the initial EF3 tornado near Schaller formed at 8:23 PM CDT (01:23 UTC), a second large and significant tornado formed on its eastern flank. The tornado started out just to the east of Fox Avenue in the central-northwest section of Sac County, and headed northeast. Along the path of the tornado, the tornado impacted one farm that was located to the far west of IA 471, heavily damaging one outbuilding, which was impacted at EF0 intensity. After causing this instance of insignificant damage, the tornado persisted to the northeast and began to head towards Early. At around 8:38 PM CDT (01:38 UTC) a satellite tornado developed to the south-southwest of Early, south of the four-way intersection connecting both 270th Street and Hope Avenue, and northeast of a farm near the much larger tornado. This secondary, EF0-rated tornado, primarily stayed across rural farmland and inflicted no notable damage. The EF0 satellite moved north-northwest before it conducted a full loop pattern to the east, and crossed its own initial trajectory before returning back on its primarily northward track. The satellite's path then suddenly jogged to the northeast, before heading due north and encroached on 270th Avenue. After crossing the road, the satellite then moved more northwest again, before dissipating just prior to hitting another farm approximately 2 minutes after its formation, at 8:40 PM CDT (01:40 UTC).

==== Damage in Early and demise ====
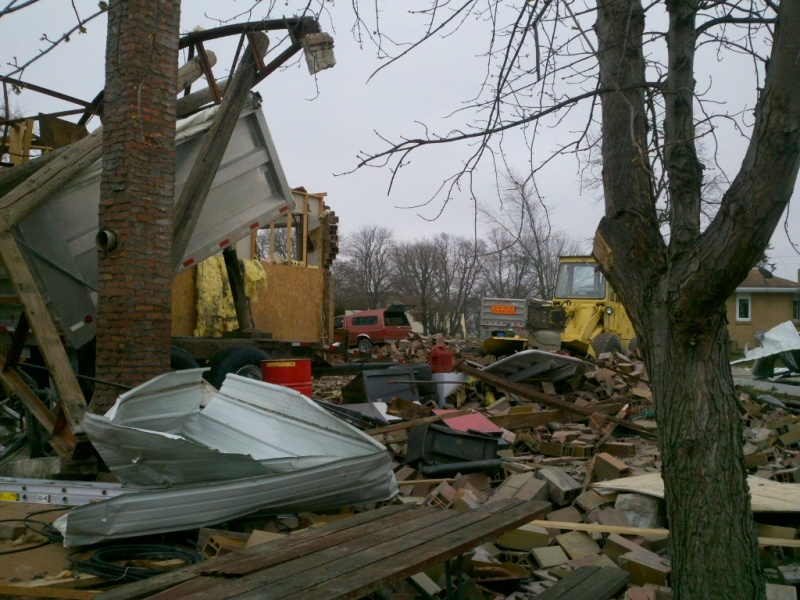
Buildings are seen destroyed at EF2 intensity in Early

Meanwhile, the main tornado impacted the city of Early, causing significant amounts of damage throughout the 605-people community. Numerous trees and buildings were damaged by the tornado, which at this point reached EF2 intensity, as pieces of branches and debris from structures were blown onto lawns to the west of a restaurant. To the west along Second Street, around 75% of a brick building belonging to a trucking company was compromised and spilled into two lots. At the intersection of Main Street, the worst of the impact was seen, as a Payless Cashways building was completely destroyed. To the northwest at Second and Main Streets, the roof off a repair business and was found propped up against a nearby house. Four nearby trees were strewn with building insulation, including one that had was adorned by a 4 by 12 feet (120 cm × 370 cm) sheet metal piece. After causing much destruction in town, the tornado exited out of Early through the northern side, subsequently weakening as it encroached over US 20. Thereafter, at 8:54 PM CDT (01:54 UTC) the tornado dissipated on the northern side of Early, at the northern intersection connecting US 20 with IA 471.

This large and damaging EF2 tornado with estimated 132 mph (212 km/h) winds, was on the ground along a path 8.34 miles (13.42 km) long and 660 yards (600 m) wide. The tornado caused no reported fatalities or injuries at all during its 25-minute lifespan across rural areas around Early and within the city. Approximately $1 million USD in damages were inflicted by this tornado alone. The brief and erratic EF0 satellite tornado that was accompanied its EF2 parent tornado, lasted for 2 minutes throughout its short track of 0.63 miles (1.01 km) long, and 100 yards (91 m) wide. Estimated winds for this tornado were at 70 mph (110 km/h). An estimated $1,000 USD in damage was inflicted by this satellite.

=== Nemaha–Ware, Iowa ===
Nemaha–Ware, Iowa
- The EF3 tornado (right) seen in Pocahontas County alongside a satellite tornado (left)

Meteorological history
- Formed: April 9, 2011; 9:08 PM CDT (UTC−05:00)
- Dissipated: April 9, 2011; 10:07 PM CDT (UTC−05:00)
- Duration: 59 minutes

EF3 tornado
- on the Enhanced Fujita scale
- Highest winds: 145 mph (233 km/h)

Satellite tornadoes
- Tornadoes: 5 confirmed
- Max. rating: EF4 tornado
- Highest winds: 170 mph (270 km/h)

Overall effects
- Fatalities: 0
- Injuries: 0
- Damage: $16.12 million (2011 USD) (Parent and satellite tornadoes)

==== Parent EF3 tornado formation ====
Later, the supercell which produced the previous significant tornadoes, dropped this massive and long-lived EF3 wedge tornado at 9:08 PM CDT (02:08 UTC) to the west of Nemaha in northern Sac County, following the dissipation of an EF2 tornado that went through the small city of Early. The massive tornado at this point, reached a width of 2,200 yards (1.3 mi; 2.0 km) as it damaged one farmstead at EF2 intensity along an 8.42 mi (13.55 km) path within Sac County.

==== First EF2 satellite and damage in Varina ====
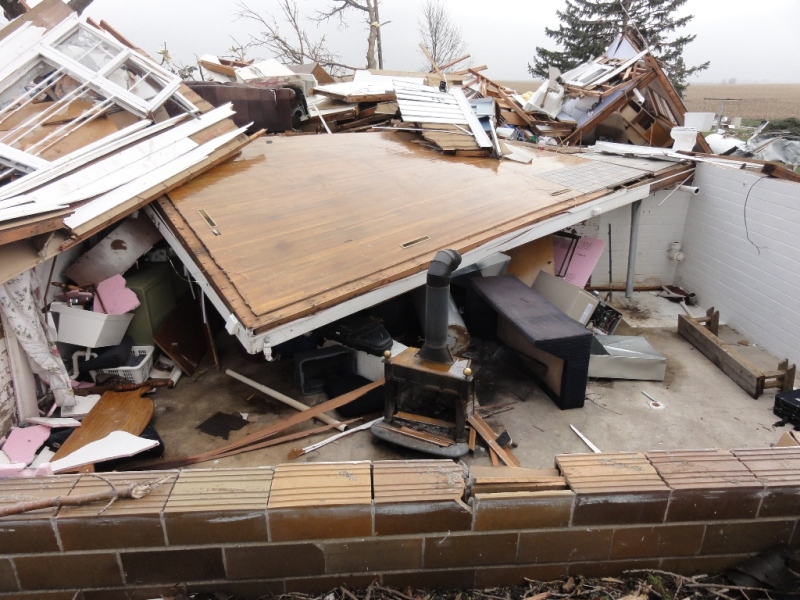
A home in Varina destroyed at EF2 intensity

After exiting Sac County into Buena Vista County, a narrow satellite tornado developed at 9:24 PM CDT (02:24 UTC) on the east flank of the main tornado tornado, south of the Sac–Buena Vista County line. This EF2-rated tornado, with estimated winds of 115 mph (185 km/h) lasted for 3 minutes, but damaged trees and buildings on a farm before dissipating along a 1.6 mi (2.6 km) path, and causing $510,000 USD in damage to the property. The wedge tornado traversed along a 3.78 mi (6.08 km) path through extreme southeastern Buena Vista County, shrinking down to 1,320 yards (0.75 mi; 1.21 km) and causing EF2 damage to several farms and powerlines. Livestock shelters and farm equipment in this section of the path were destroyed as well southeast of Newell. The parent tornado then crossed Buena Vista County over into neighboring Pocahontas County afterwards. In Pocahontas County, the large tornado grew to its maximum width of 2,640 yards (1.50 mi; 2.41 km). It continued northeast before erratically turning to the north, causing EF0 damage to a house northwest of Fonda. The tornado continued to the north and moved into the Sunken Island Lake and Grove Wild Life Management Area. Afterwards, the tornado impacted the community of Varina at EF2 intensity, causing heavy damage to homes and an elementary school gymnasium. Despite the considerable damage, no deaths or injuries were reported as the storm passed through. The tornado then abruptly turned to the northeast, damaging a farmstead at EF1 intensity. Up ahead, extensive EF2 damage was inflicted to some structures and EF1 damage to a home, as the tornado was far west of Pocahontas.

==== Additional satellites, including EF4 tornado ====
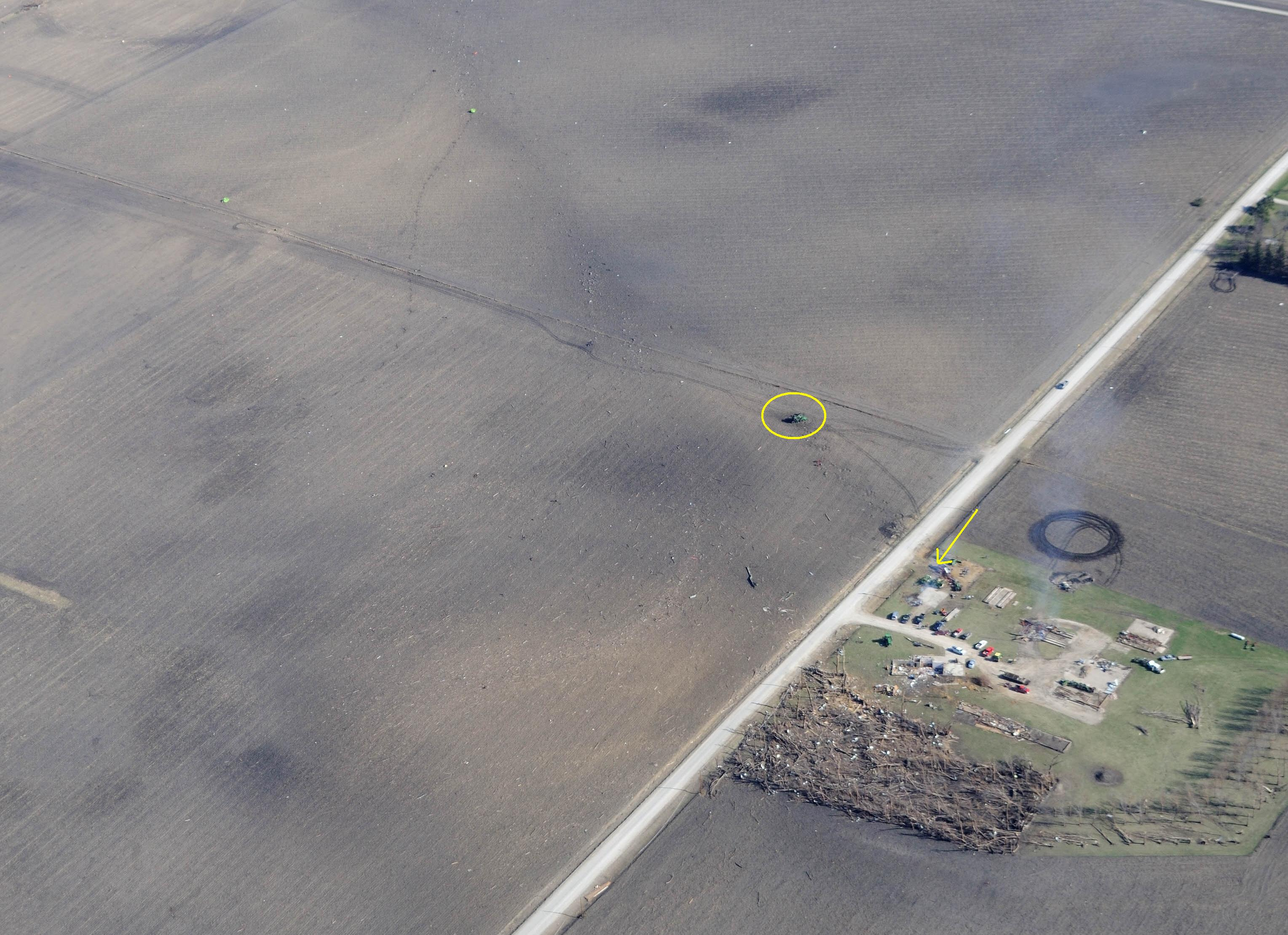
An entire farmstead was destroyed after an EF4 tornado west of Pocahontas. A combine (encircled) was displaced from the machine barn (arrow highlight) it originated from.

Four satellite tornadoes touched down nearby to the west-southwest of Pocahontas, with the first of them being a relatively brief, but violent EF4 tornado that formed on the west flank of the main wedge tornado at at 9:54 PM CDT (02:54 UTC). Despite lasting for 7 minutes along a 3.2 mi (5.1 km) path, this destructive satellite tornado completely leveled a farmhouse while a family was sheltering in a storm cellar. Barns and a machine shed were destroyed, as a combine harvester from the shed was tossed into a field 100 yards (91 m) away, before it was severely mangled. Winds were estimated at 170 mph (270 km/h) which made this the strongest tornado of the event. The other satellites were an EF2 tornado with winds of 115 mph (185 km/h), and a pair of EF1 tornadoes, one cyclonic and the other anticyclonic. The EF2 tornado touched down at 9:56 PM CDT (02:56 UTC) and lasted for 2 minutes, while traveling for 0.9 mi (1.4 km) and abruptly ending after being absorbed by the previous EF4 tornado.

==== EF3 tornado impact on Ware and dissipation ====
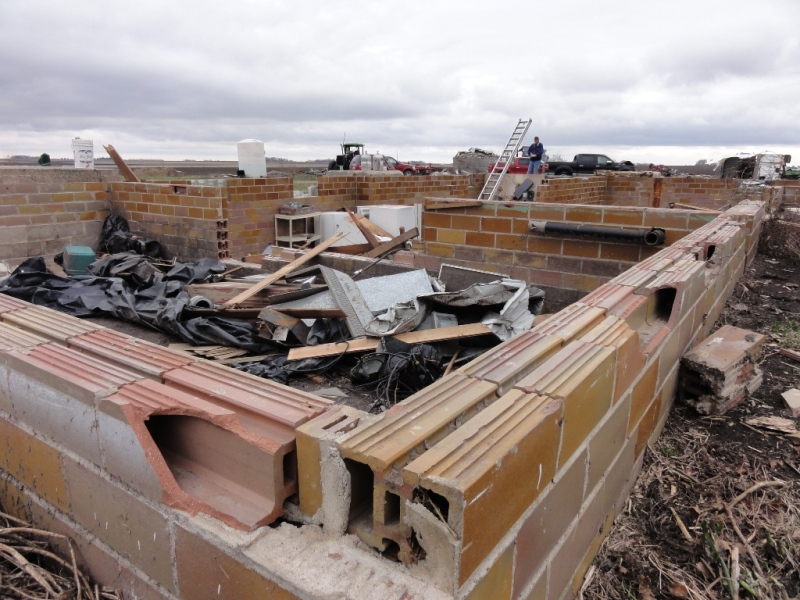
EF3 damage to a farmhouse northwest of Pocahontas by the main wedge tornado

The main tornado then intensified further and reached its peak intensity, causing EF3 damage to one farmhouse and demolishing several outbuildings on the farm. More homes to the north were impacted at EF2 intensity, including one in Ware. After causing considerable damage in the community of Ware, the main EF3 tornado would start weakening and dissipate southwest of Havelock at 10:07 PM CDT (03:07 UTC).

The EF3 tornado that struck Varina and Ware alongside rural areas across Sac, Buena Vista and Pocahontas Counties was the largest, longest lived and costliest tornado of the event as it caused $13 million USD in damages. It tracked for 29.37 miles (47.27 km) and was up to 2,640 yards (2,410 m) wide at its largest. The EF4 tornado in rural western Pocahontas County, was the strongest tornado of the night and of the entire outbreak from April 9–11. This violent satellite tornado caused $2.5 million USD in damage, tracked for 3.2 miles (5.1 km) and was 587 yards (537 m) wide. Two other pairs of satellite tornadoes, one group of two separate EF2 tornadoes, and a duo of cyclonic and anticyclonic EF1 twin tornadoes, also occurred and caused significant damage throughout the tri-county area. Despite the excessive tornadic activity, no fatalities or injuries were reported by this tornado event.

=== Other tornadoes ===
During the evening, several other tornadoes occurred across northwestern Iowa. Underneath is a list of all other documented events, with some being part of the same tornado family that struck from Monona County, all the way to Kossuth County.

List of confirmed tornadoes – Saturday, April 9, 2011 (Note: All dates are based on the local time zone where the tornado touched down; however, all times are in Coordinated Universal Time and dates are split at midnight CDT for consistency.)
EF#	Location	County / Parish	State	Start Coord.	Time (UTC)	Path length	Max width	Damage (Note: All damage totals are in 2011 USD unless otherwise stated.)
EF1	NW of Ricketts	Crawford	IA	42.1956°N 95.6493°W	00:37–00:38	0.69 mi (1.11 km)	75 yd (69 m)	$25,000
EF1	This tornado, which was produced by the same storm as the Mapleton EF3 tornado, knocked down power lines.							
EF2	W of Arthur	Ida	IA	42.3217°N 95.3969°W	01:20–01:28	4.13 mi (6.65 km)	440 yd (400 m)	$50,000
EF2	This tornado occurred between Arthur and Ida Grove, where two grain bins and two outbuildings on a farmstead were either heavily damaged or destroyed, and a house and garage sustained shingle damage. Several trees were downed, and power poles and lines were damaged.							
EF3	NW of Odebolt to E of Schaller	Sac	IA	42.3549°N 95.2860°W	01:23–01:55	10.14 mi (16.32 km)	1,760 yd (1,610 m)	$2,000,000
EF3	A large wedge tornado formed northeast and northwest of Arthur and Odebolt, and headed northwards. It damaged or destroyed several houses and downed power lines. It initially moved northeast toward Early before making a sharp turn north-northwest to just east of Schaller. This tornado occurred simultaneously to and just west of the following tornado. It was accompanied by the EF2 tornado that directly struck Early.							
EF0	SSW of Early	Sac	IA	42.3948°N 95.2027°W	01:38–01:40	0.75 mi (1.21 km)	100 yd (91 m)	$1,000
EF0	This tornado formed as a satellite to the Early EF2 tornado. It executed a brief loop and then moved due north before dissipating. It remained primarily over open country.							
EF1	S of Galva	Ida	IA	42.4364°N 95.4499°W	01:42–01:47	4.21 mi (6.78 km)	200 yd (180 m)	$100,000
EF1	A farmstead was severely damaged, with numerous outbuildings destroyed and a home losing its roof. Outbuildings at another farmstead were damaged, as was an outbuilding at an ethanol plant. At least five power poles were snapped, and trees were downed as well.							
EF0	S of Sulphur Springs	Buena Vista	IA	42.58°N 95.09°W	02:14–02:15	0.53 mi (0.85 km)	50 yd (46 m)	$0
EF0	This brief tornado occurred just a few miles north of the long-track EF3 tornado that began at 02:08 UTC. No damage was reported.							
EF1	SSE of Cherokee	Cherokee	IA	42.6067°N 95.5435°W	02:20–02:30	5.17 mi (8.32 km)	300 yd (270 m)	$100,000
EF1	Several outbuildings were damaged or destroyed on two farmsteads, a camper was flipped into a garage, causing damage to both, a large anchored empty tank was flipped, and several buildings in a livestock confinement area were heavily damaged. A house sustained roof damage and broken windows, a grain bin was blown into a semi truck, and a semi trailer was flipped onto another grain bin. Several trees were snapped or uprooted, corn stubble was scoured, and power poles and lines were damage.							
EF2	SE of Newell	Sac, Buena Vista	IA	42.5556°N 94.9744°W	02:24–02:27	1.6 mi (2.6 km)	220 yd (200 m)	$510,000
EF2	This was the first satellite tornado of the Nemaha to Ware EF3 tornado. One farmstead was damaged.							
EF1	ESE of Newell	Buena Vista	IA	42.5751°N 94.9438°W	02:25–02:27	1.08 mi (1.74 km)	150 yd (140 m)	$10,000
EF1	Several outbuildings and farm structures were damaged. This tornado tracked over the same track of the Nemaha to Ware EF3 tornado.							
EF0	SW of Alta	Buena Vista	IA	42.64°N 95.34°W	02:50–02:51	0.17 mi (0.27 km)	50 yd (46 m)	$0
EF0	A storm chaser reported two simultaneous brief tornadoes with no damage.							
EF0	SW of Alta	Buena Vista	IA	42.65°N 95.35°W	02:50–02:51	0.17 mi (0.27 km)	50 yd (46 m)	$0
EF0	A storm chaser reported two simultaneous brief tornadoes with no damage.							
EF4	W of Pocahontas	Pocahontas	IA	42.7293°N 94.8557°W	02:54–03:01	3.2 mi (5.1 km)	587 yd (537 m)	$2,500,000
EF4	This was the second satellite tornado of the Nemaha to Ware EF3 tornado. One farmstead was completely devastated by this violent tornado. The EF4 tornado absorbed the circulation of another EF2 satellite.							
EF1	WSW of Pocahontas	Pocahontas	IA	42.6895°N 94.8141°W	02:55–02:58	1.58 mi (2.54 km)	100 yd (91 m)	$10,000
EF1	This was the third satellite tornado of the Nemaha to Ware EF3 tornado. This was the cyclonic counterpart of the following, fourth satellite tornado.							
EF1	WSW of Pocahontas	Pocahontas	IA	42.6912°N 94.8141°W	02:55–02:58	1.64 mi (2.64 km)	100 yd (91 m)	$10,000
EF1	This was the fourth satellite tornado of the Nemaha to Ware EF3 tornado. This was the anticyclonic counterpart of the previous, third satellite tornado.							
EF2	W of Pocahontas	Pocahontas	IA	42.7105°N 94.8144°W	02:56–02:58	0.9 mi (1.4 km)	146 yd (134 m)	$100,000
EF2	This was the fifth and final satellite tornado of the Nemaha to Ware EF3 tornado. This tornado was quickly absorbed by the second, violent EF4 satellite tornado near Pocahontas.							
EF1	WNW of Pocahontas	Pocahontas	IA	42.7340°N 94.7442°W	03:08–03:13	2.42 mi (3.89 km)	250 yd (230 m)	$10,000
EF1	One house was damaged as the tornado remained over mostly open fields. This tornado occurred east of the track of the Nemaha to Ware EF3 tornado that had just dissipated to the northwest.							
EF1	WNW of St. Joseph	Kossuth	IA	42.9231°N 94.2771°W	04:19–04:21	0.79 mi (1.27 km)	100 yd (91 m)	$150,000
EF1	A hog barn was damaged, numerous windows were blown out, and a shed was partially collapsed.							

== Aftermath ==
=== NWS assessments ===
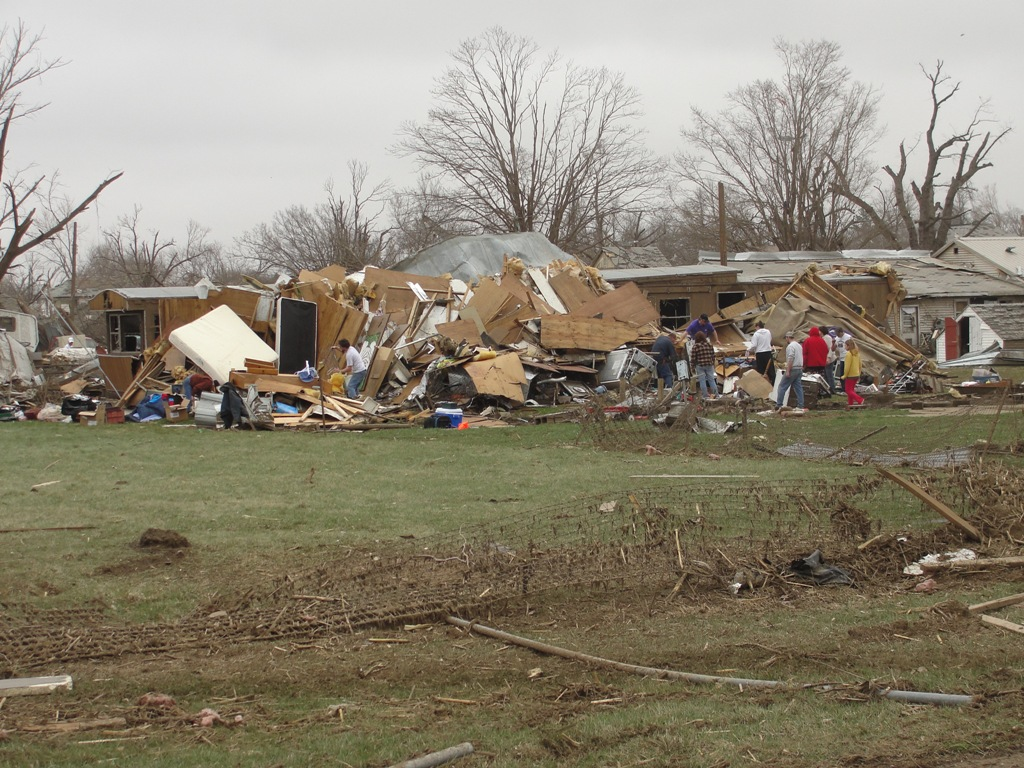
Tornado damage rated by NWS Omaha to a home in Mapleton following the EF3 tornado

The following day on Sunday, April 10, 2011, three National Weather Service (NWS) offices from Des Moines, Iowa; Omaha, Nebraska and Sioux Falls, South Dakota; conducted damage surveys across large portions of western and northern Iowa, following the tornadoes from Saturday prior. Over in the NWS Des Moines's county warning area (CWA), the weather office at 4:56 AM CDT (09:08 UTC) scheduled a survey across Sac, Pocahontas and Kossuth Counties. Later in the day, the NWS Sioux Falls office confirmed that two EF1 and EF2 tornadoes occurred near Arthur and Galva, published in a preliminary report at 1:38 PM (18:38 UTC). Less than 2 hours later, NWS Omaha damage surveyors at 3:08 PM CDT (20:08 UTC) published a public information statement that the assessment teams discovered lower end EF3 damage in Mapleton, with further assessments to be completed in the coming days.

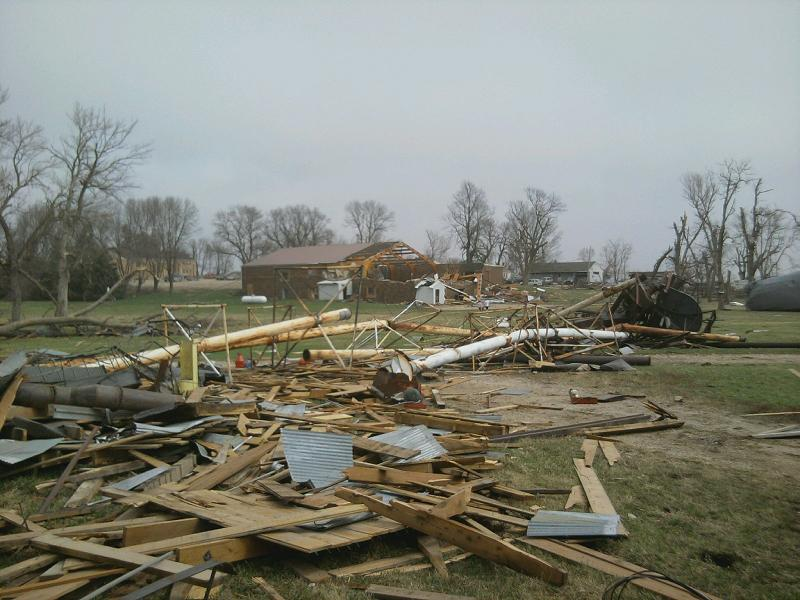
EF2 damage in Varina that was assessed by NWS Des Moines

In the NWS Des Moines's CWA, the office published another report at 7:03 PM CDT (00:03 UTC) on Sunday, confirming the ratings of the tornadoes. Prior to the finalization done by the National Centers for Environmental Information, (Note: The National Centers for Environmental Information (NCEI) was previously operating as the National Climatic Data Center (NCDC) until 2015.) surveyors noted the presence of multiple tornadoes that tracked throughout the CWA, with the strongest being a high-end EF3 tornado with winds of 165 mph (266 km/h) that struck northwest of Pocahontas (City). One combine harvester by this tornado was blown and rolled several times in a nearby field. In May 2011, this tornado was upgraded from its original EF3 rating, to an EF4 with winds of 170 mph (270 km/h). It was also discovered that the tornado was a satellite in conjunction with a much larger tornado. The newly upgraded tornado became the first EF4 to strike Iowa, since one impacted near Sibley on June 25, 2010. It was also among the very first tornadoes to be exclusively rated as such on the Enhanced Fujita scale; as prior to that and even a destructive EF5 tornado that devastated Parkersburg on May 22, 2008; the state has not seen such a tornado ever since according to an NWS meteorologist working at the Des Moines office. The EF4 tornado was also the first violent tornado to occur in 2011, and was one of more than a dozen such to have taken place during the historic April season that year. The next EF4+ tornado occurred on April 22, within the northern St. Louis metropolitan area across primarily Missouri, but also parts of Illinois.

=== Regional impact ===
According to Corn Belt Power Cooperative, the tornadoes and family of tornadoes that struck on April 9, caused widespread destruction to many rural communities and agricultural areas across western and northern Iowa. Approximately 60% of the buildings in Mapleton, sustained damage by one of the tornadoes. Fourteen people were injured but did not get killed by the tornado, making it the only tornado to cause casualties during the event. Across farming areas within Pocahontas County, homes and farm equipment were destroyed. Corn Belt Power reported that storms inflicted extensive damage the cooperative experienced to its transmission lines and substations in Sac, Buena Vista and Pocahontas Counties. Dan Watnem, transmission superintendent, cited that the cooperative lost nearly 50 transmission towers, which equated to $1 million (2011 USD) in losses. Damage also occurred with two of Corn Belt Power's distribution co-op members, Raccoon Valley Electric Cooperative and Iowa Lakes Electric Cooperative. Together, both organizations had around 3,000 members lose access to power after the storms. Former Raccoon Valley director Keith Mentzer, had his home narrowly struck by two tornadoes northeast of Odebolt. Both he and his wife survived the tornado encounters, but their property was largely deemed a total loss by their insurance company. In total, after finalizations of the monetary losses were estimated, the tornadoes that struck parts of Iowa on April 9 inflicted more than $19.5 million (2011 USD) in damages.

In Pocahontas County, county law enforcement reported that 7 hog containment units and several houses were leveled. One family, the Murrays, were taking cover in a storm shelter inside their farmhouse's basement, when one tornado leveled their residence and destroyed their barns. A pickup truck belonging to the Murray family, which originally sat in their garage, ended up crumpled in the basement. A nearby combine harvester was rolled into a field, and left mangled. For the entire time, the tornado took 8 seconds to completely level the farmhouse, which Jim Murray told to a KCCI journalist.

=== Recovery process ===
==== Statewide and federal response ====
Following the storms, in April, former Iowa governor Terry Branstad proclaimed a disaster declaration for the affected city of Mapleton and counties of Buena Vista, Monona, Sac and Pocahontas, but also Calhoun County. On May 5, then U.S. president Barack Obama declared that the previously mentioned Iowan counties were eligible to be aided with assistance from the Federal Emergency Management Agency (FEMA). (Note: Verified claims within [3] can be found in many of the county tornado reports.)

==== Mapleton's efforts ====
In Mapleton, the town's impact was nothing short than a "Mapleton Miracle," after one of the tornadoes struck the Monona County city but did not result in any deaths. During the community's recovery process in the following days, many volunteers across Iowa came into Mapleton and pitched into relief efforts, providing services such as debris cleanups. Some of these people came from the northeastern city of Parkersburg, who themselves experienced what it was like when an extremely violent tornado leveled a majority of that town and killed several residents back in May 2008. The actions done were believed to some a success in preventing loss of life after a deadly EF3 tornado struck near Little Sioux weeks later that year. In Mapleton, classes at the city's school were canceled so that repairs could be done on Monday, April 10. Students were to return on the day after on April 11 following an inspection by an engineer. The American Red Cross aided the survivors and assisted emergency services and volunteer search and rescue workers, in which they received supplies such as food and water from the organization. In 2016, five years since the tornado, Brian Smeltzer, a veteran director of choirs at MVAO High School, can still remember the moment when he stopped a music festival and directed 27 cast members and audience members into an old locker room underneath the stage, when the storm struck. Empty and vacant cement lots were seen across spots in Mapleton. The 2011 tornado however, was not brought up a lot during everyday conversations, stated Karla Uhl, the city's clerk and overseer of 278 building permits that were filed two years after the storm. According to Uhl, the reconstruction costed around $10.4 million USD for Mapleton in the years since the tornado.

==== Recovery in Early ====
Months after one of the tornadoes struck the small city of Early, in January 2012, the town returned to normalcy ever since the storms of the year prior. FEMA granted approximately $52,146 (2011 USD) in financial assistance to fix buildings belonging to the municipal government, fire department and also a fence at the city's ballpark. A new steel building was erected at the site of Noll Trucking, which was left in ruins after the EF2 tornado struck Robert Noll's shop. The remains of a vacant brick building was left as a reminder of the 2011 tornado, while most buildings were already repaired and reconstructed. Across the community, some residential and commercial properties sported new shingles and sidings on the exterior. Residents believed that while the tornado's impact, while disastrous for Early, did result benefiting the townspeople who lived there. People quickly moved on after the tornado, with especially rapid recovery efforts contributing the most. Debris removal was completed after around a week since the tornado.

==== Varina's post office return ====
In September 2019, Varina reopened their post office at a new location in the community 8 years after the damaging EF3 tornado that tracked through Sac, Buena Vista and Pocahontas Counties. Prior to its return, the community's postal office was temporarily relocated to Fonda for the time being.

== See also ==
- Weather of 2011
- Tornadoes of 2011
- List of United States tornadoes in April 2011
- 2014 Pilger tornado family – An event in Nebraska, where a cyclic supercell produced a family of tornadoes, including four violent EF4 tornadoes
- 2017 East Texas tornadoes – A similar event in Texas, where multiple tornadoes touched down in a regional area, including some strong to violent EF2–EF4 tornadoes
- 2025 South Kansas tornado family – An event in Kansas, where a supercell dropped multiple large and intense EF3 tornadoes at night
