= Cummins Township, Pocahontas County, Iowa =

Township in Iowa, United States

Coordinates: 42.8629°N 94.7479°W

Cummins Township is a township in Pocahontas County, Iowa, United States. Havelock is contained within Cummins Township.

== History ==
Cummins Township was organized from part of Washington Township in 1909.

== Geography ==
Cummins Township has an area of 36.7 square miles, of which 0.02 square miles are water. Its elevation is 1253 feet above sea level. A plover waterfowl production area is located in Cummins Township. Lizard Creek, North Branch Lizard Creek, and Pilot Creek run through Cummins.

== Demographics ==
As of the 2020 census, Cummins Township had a population of 254 residents, of whom 223 were white, two were Black, one was Asian, 11 were of another race, and 17 were two or more races. As of the 2021 American Community Survey, six residents of Cummins Township were estimated to be Hispanic or Latino of any race.

== Government ==
Cummins Township is in District 1 of the Pocahontas County Board of Supervisors, which is currently represented by Jeffrey Ives. It is in District 7 of the Iowa General Assembly, currently represented by Republican Mike Sexton, and in District 4 of the Iowa Senate, currently represented by Republican Tim Kraayenbrink of District 5. Cummins Township is in of Iowa's 4th congressional district, and its representative in the United States House of Representatives is Republican Randy Feenstra.

== Education ==
Cummins Township is in the Pocahontas Area Community School District.
