= Center Township, Iowa =

Center Township may refer to the following places in the U.S. state of Iowa:

- Center Township, Allamakee County, Iowa
- Center Township, Calhoun County, Iowa
- Center Township, Cedar County, Iowa
- Center Township, Clinton County, Iowa
- Center Township, Decatur County, Iowa
- Center Township, Dubuque County, Iowa
- Center Township, Emmet County, Iowa
- Center Township, Fayette County, Iowa
- Center Township, Henry County, Iowa
- Center Township, Jefferson County, Iowa
- Center Township, Mills County, Iowa
- Center Township, Monona County, Iowa
- Center Township, O'Brien County, Iowa
- Center Township, Pocahontas County, Iowa
- Center Township, Pottawattamie County, Iowa
- Center Township, Shelby County, Iowa
- Center Township, Sioux County, Iowa
- Center Township, Wapello County, Iowa
- Center Township, Winnebago County, Iowa

== See also ==
- Center Township (disambiguation)
