= Ware, Iowa =

- Unincorporated community
- Location within Iowa
- Coordinates: 42°47′25″N 94°45′33″W
- Country: United States
- State: Iowa
- County: Pocahontas
- Elevation: 1,289 ft (393 m)
- Time zone: UTC-6 (Central (CST))
  - Summer (DST): UTC-5 (CDT)
- Area code: 712
- GNIS feature ID: 462676

Ware is an unincorporated community in Sherman Township, Pocahontas County, Iowa, United States. Ware is 6 miles (9.7 km) northwest of Pocahontas.

== History ==
Ware got its start following construction of the Chicago, Rock Island and Pacific Railroad through that territory. It was named for Francis L. Ware, who owned the town site. The population was 75 in 1940.
