= Pocahontas County Courthouse (Iowa) =

Historic government building in Iowa, United States

- U.S. National Register of Historic Places
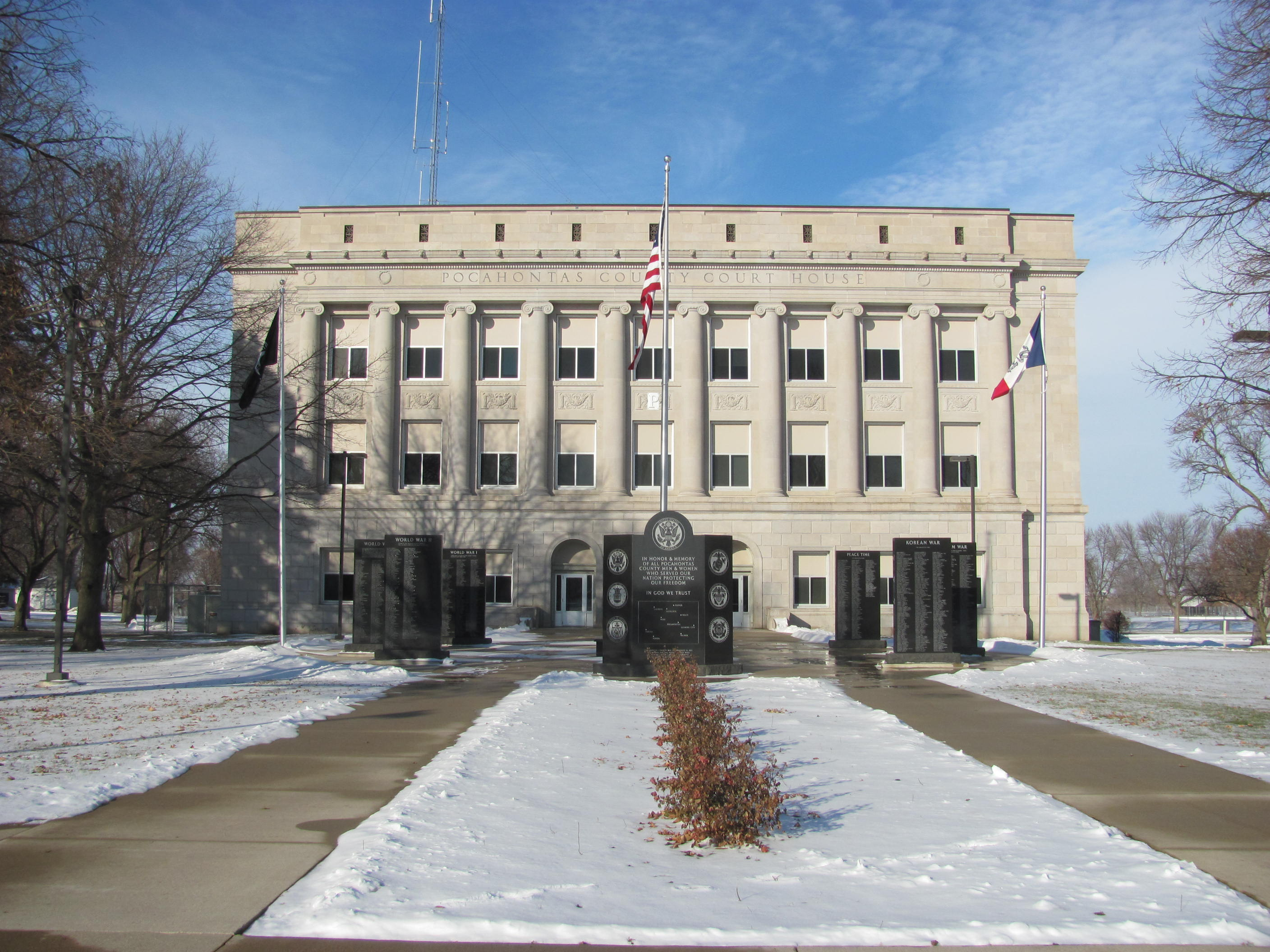
- Courthouse in 2014

- Location within Iowa Location within the United States
- Location: Court Square; Pocahontas, Iowa
- Coordinates: 42°44′13.7″N 94°40′08″W
- Area: less than one acre
- Built: 1923
- Built by: A.H. Neuman & Co.
- Architect: Proudfoot, Bird & Rawson
- Architectural style: Classical Revival
- MPS: County Courthouses in Iowa TR
- NRHP reference No.: 81000264
- Added to NRHP: July 2, 1981

The Pocahontas County Courthouse located in Pocahontas, Iowa, United States, was built in 1923. It was listed on the National Register of Historic Places in 1981 as a part of the County Courthouses in Iowa Thematic Resource. The courthouse is the third building the county has used for court functions and county administration.

== History ==
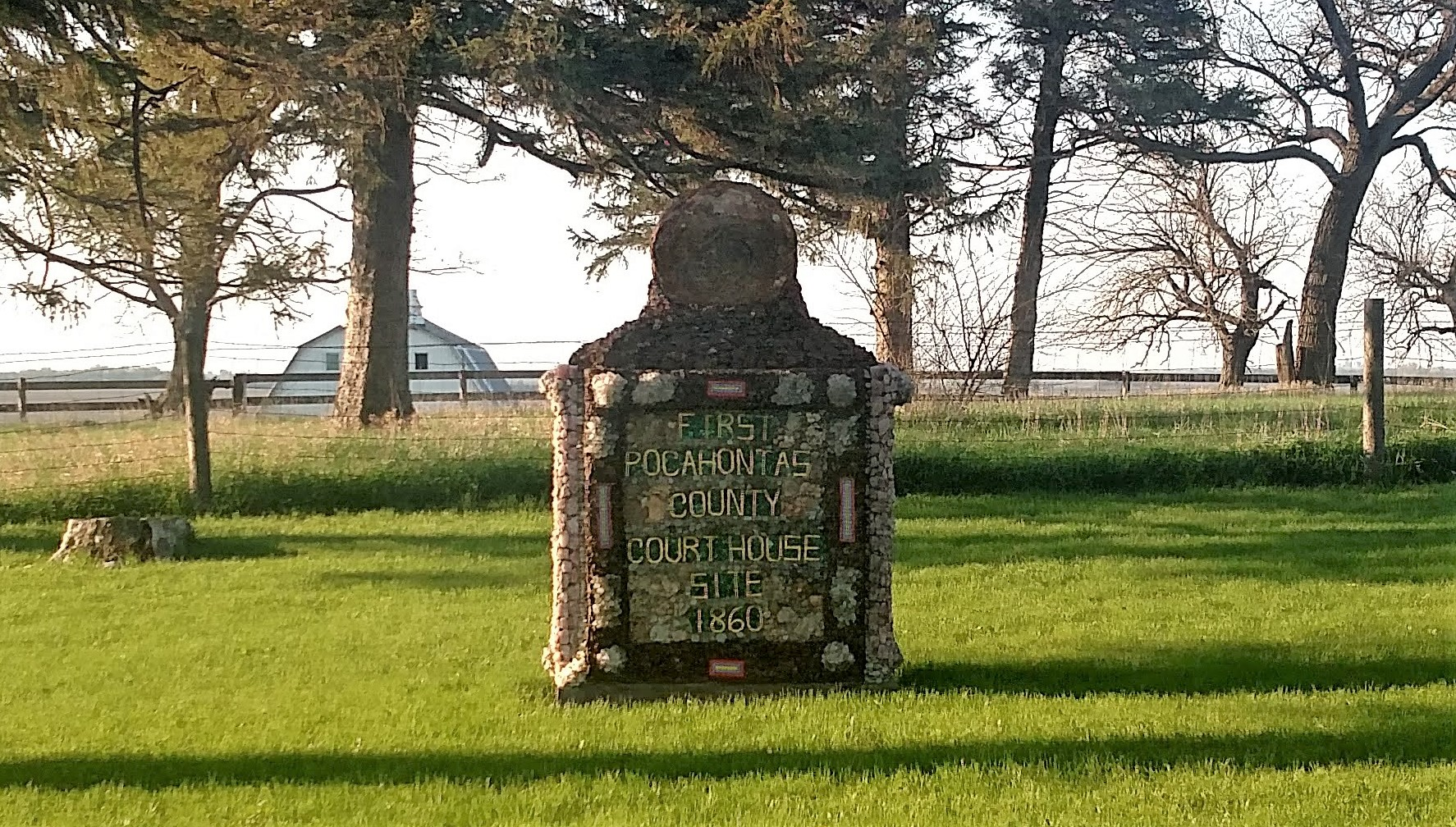
Marker for the courthouse in Old Rolfe

The first county seat for Pocahontas County was located at a place called Old Rolfe. The courthouse there was a brick building on a stone foundation that also served as a schoolhouse. The bricks for the 50-by-36-foot (15 by 11 m) building were made of local clay. In order to raise funds for the courthouse, the county sold swamp land in 1859. The county seat was moved to Pocahontas in 1875. A new courthouse was built there for $2,600 on the public square. The previous courthouse in Old Rolfe was sold for $150 for use as a church, but the sale did not go through and it was sold at a public auction for $200. It was sold again in 1882 and salvaged for its materials to build a house in the new community of Rolfe.

The present courthouse was designed by the Des Moines architectural firm of Proudfoot, Bird & Rawson in the Neoclassical style. The building was completed in 1923 by the A.H. Neuman & Company.

== Architecture ==
The three-story structure was constructed of brick and Bedford stone. The exterior features a rather severe form of Neoclassicism with its restrained detailing. The main entrance is through three arched entryways on the main level. Doric columns rise from the second to third floors on the south elevation. Festoons are located between the columns and the second- and third-floor windows. A projecting cornice runs below the roofline. The building is capped with a flat roof. The interior features a variety of materials and extensive decorative detail. Noteworthy are the metal and marble staircase and the coffered ceiling in the courtroom. There is also a rotunda with paneled soffits, decorative cornices, screens of piers with decorative caps on the third-floor, globe light fixtures, decorative frieze, and a circular art glass skylight dome. The significance of the courthouse is derived from its association with county government, and the political power and prestige of Pocahontas as the county seat.
