= Lizard Township, Pocahontas County, Iowa =

Township in Pocahontas County, Iowa, U.S.

Coordinates: 42.602°N 94.502°W

Lizard Township is a township in Pocahontas County, Iowa, United States.

== History ==
Lizard Township was established in 1859. It is named for the Lizard Creek, which was said by Native Americans to resemble a lizard.
