= Dover Township, Pocahontas County, Iowa =

Township in Pocahontas County, Iowa, U.S.

Coordinates: 42.69°N 94.89°W

Dover Township is a township in Pocahontas County, Iowa, United States.

== History ==
Dover Township was organized in 1870.
