= Cedar Township, Pocahontas County, Iowa =

Township in Pocahontas County, Iowa, U.S.

Coordinates: 42.5992°N 94.8592°W

Cedar Township is a township in Pocahontas County, Iowa, United States.

== History ==
Cedar Township was established in 1870, soon after the railroad had been built through that territory.
