= Pocahontas Area Community School District =

Public school district in Pocahontas, Iowa, United States

Coordinates: 42.731840°N 94.671942°W

Location
- Pocahontas, Iowa Pocahontas, Calhoun, and Palo Alto counties United States
- Coordinates: 42.731840, -94.671942

District information
- Type: Local school district
- Grades: K–12
- Established: 1989
- Superintendent: Robert Boley
- Schools: 3
- Budget: $14,098,000 (2020-21)
- NCES District ID: 1923190

Students and staff
- Students: 739 (2022-23)
- Teachers: 53.03 FTE
- Staff: 64.55 FTE
- Student–teacher ratio: 13.94
- Athletic conference: Twin Lakes
- District mascot: Indians
- Colors: Red, White, and Black

Other information
- Website: www.pacsd.org

Pocahontas Area Community School District (PAC) is a rural public school district headquartered in Pocahontas, Iowa.

The district is mostly in Pocahontas County, with some parts in Calhoun County and very small sections in Palo Alto County. Communities served include Pocahontas, Havelock, Palmer, Plover, Pomeroy and Rolfe.

As of 2018 it has about 900 students.

A school bond referendum is scheduled for November 3, 2026.

== History ==
On July 1, 1989, the Havelock-Plover School District consolidated into the Pocahontas School District, and the resulting district was the Pocahontas Area School District. On July 1, 1993, the Rolfe School District consolidated into the Pocahontas Area district.

Ghan Consultants owner Guy Ghan prepared a 2007 report proposing the consolidation of Pocahontas Area and three other school districts, with a single high school west of Pocahontas, though the impetus for this would have been years away.

Circa 2006, the district had 650 students, but circa 2012, there were around 500. At one point the Pocahontas district established a grade-sharing arrangement, in which one district sends its students to another district's school, with the Pomeroy–Palmer Community School District. On July 1, 2012, the Pomeroy-Palmer district consolidated into the Pocahontas Area district. The Pocahontas district kept the Pomeroy school open after the merger.

The district began partial-day sharing, in which students from one district went to another district for some classes, with the Laurens–Marathon Community School District around 2015. In 2017, the L-M and Pocahontas districts began whole grade-sharing, in which one district sent its children to another district for certain grade levels. As a result, Laurens–Marathon sent its high school students to Pocahontas Area High School.

The current secondary building was built in the decade of the 2010s and is meant to be handicap accessible. The original secondary building was built in 1921 and was scheduled to be razed after the new building was complete.

== Schools ==
The district operates three schools in Pocahontas:

- Pocahontas Area Elementary School
- Pocahontas Area Middle/High School
- Pocahontas Area Regional Learning Center

=== Pocahontas Area High School ===
==== Athletics ====
The Indians compete in the Twin Lakes Conference in the following sports:

- Cross Country
  - Girls' 2014 Class 1A State Champions
- Volleyball
- Football
  - 1984 Class 1A State Champions
- Basketball
  - Boys' 1987 Class 1A State Champions
  - Girls 2-time Class 3A State Champions (2016, 2017)
- Wrestling
- Track and Field
  - Boys' 1971 Class C State Champions
- Golf
  - Girls' 2-time Class 1A State Champions (1980, 1981)
- Baseball
- Softball

== See also ==
- List of school districts in Iowa
- List of high schools in Iowa
