= Lincoln Township, Pocahontas County, Iowa =

Township in Pocahontas County, Iowa, U.S.

Coordinates: 42.687°N 94.618°W

Lincoln Township is a township in Pocahontas County, Iowa, United States. According to United States census data, as of 2021, the population was 109, with a median age of 63.2 and a male/female ratio of 0.61.

== History ==
Lincoln Township was established in 1872 as Carter Township, for Henry C. Carter, a county supervisor. However, the citizens in this township were not content with the name, so it was renamed Lincoln in 1873 by popular vote, in honor of Abraham Lincoln, sixteenth President of the United States.
