= Marshall Township, Pocahontas County, Iowa =

Township in Pocahontas County, Iowa, U.S.

Coordinates: 42.777°N 94.855°W

Marshall Township is a township in Pocahontas County, Iowa, United States.

== History ==
Marshall Township was established in 1882 as Laurens Township, in honor of Henry Laurens and John Laurens. However, in 1884, the citizens, many of whom hailed from Marshall County, successfully petitioned that the name be changed to Marshall.
