= Pocahontas, Iowa =

- City
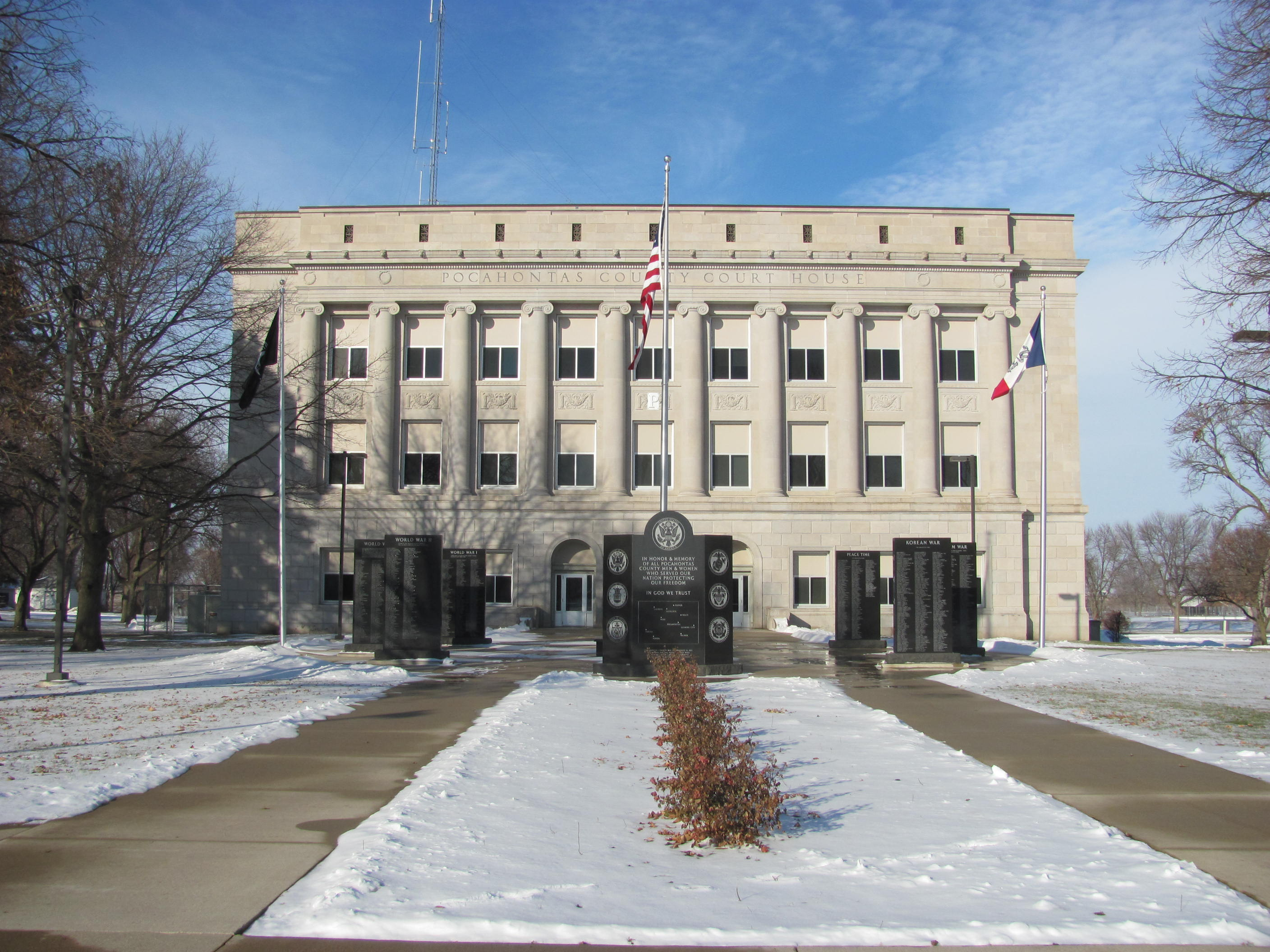
- Pocahontas County Courthouse
- Nickname: The Princess City
- Location of Pocahontas, Iowa
- Coordinates: 42°44′4″N 94°40′23″W
- Country: United States
- State: Iowa
- County: Pocahontas
- Incorporated: May 16, 1892

Government
  - Mayor: Dick Gruber

Area
  - Total: 1.98 sq mi (5.12 km^{2})
  - Land: 1.98 sq mi (5.12 km^{2})
  - Water: 0 sq mi (0.00 km^{2})
- Elevation: 1,220 ft (372 m)

Population (2020)
  - Total: 1,867
  - Density: 944.9/sq mi (364.81/km^{2})
- Time zone: UTC-6 (Central (CST))
  - Summer (DST): UTC-5 (CDT)
- ZIP code: 50574
- Area code: 712
- FIPS code: 19-63975
- GNIS feature ID: 0460342
- Website: www.pocahontasiowa.com

Pocahontas is a city in and the county seat of Pocahontas County, Iowa, United States. The population was 1,867 in the 2020 census, a decline from the 1,970 population in 2000.

== History ==
Pocahontas was first settled and surveyed in 1870 by Warrick and Buelah Price of Cleveland, Ohio. The city was named after Pocahontas, a Powhatan woman from Jamestown, Virginia. Other geographical names in the county related to the colony at Jamestown are Rolfe, Powhatan Township and Varina.

Pocahontas was incorporated as a city on May 16, 1892.

=== April 9, 2011 tornadoes ===
During the tornado outbreak of April 9–11, 2011, a regional event consisting of several tornadoes hit Pocahontas County and the surrounding areas. No injuries or fatalities were reported. The strongest was an EF4 that touched down west of town. This tornado impacted a farmstead.

== Geography ==
Pocahontas's longitude and latitude coordinates in decimal form are 42.734476, -94.673017.

According to the United States Census Bureau, the city has a total area of 2.02 square miles (5.23 km^{2}), all land.

Pocahontas lies at the northwestern margin (rim) of Manson crater, an impact structure buried by glacial till and outwash.

== Climate ==
According to the Köppen Climate Classification system, Pocahontas has a hot-summer humid continental climate, abbreviated "Dfa" on climate maps.

Climate data for Pocahontas, Iowa, 1991–2020 normals, extremes 1904–present
Month	Jan	Feb	Mar	Apr	May	Jun	Jul	Aug	Sep	Oct	Nov	Dec	Year
Record high °F (°C)	68 (20)	67 (19)	87 (31)	98 (37)	107 (42)	106 (41)	110 (43)	111 (44)	101 (38)	94 (34)	81 (27)	68 (20)	111 (44)
Mean maximum °F (°C)	44.4 (6.9)	51.3 (10.7)	69.9 (21.1)	82.7 (28.2)	90.6 (32.6)	94.3 (34.6)	93.4 (34.1)	91.5 (33.1)	89.7 (32.1)	84.6 (29.2)	67.7 (19.8)	51.2 (10.7)	95.9 (35.5)
Mean daily maximum °F (°C)	25.6 (−3.6)	30.1 (−1.1)	43.6 (6.4)	58.8 (14.9)	70.9 (21.6)	81.4 (27.4)	84.4 (29.1)	81.8 (27.7)	76.1 (24.5)	62.3 (16.8)	45.0 (7.2)	31.2 (−0.4)	57.6 (14.2)
Daily mean °F (°C)	16.6 (−8.6)	20.9 (−6.2)	33.8 (1.0)	47.2 (8.4)	59.7 (15.4)	70.4 (21.3)	73.4 (23.0)	70.6 (21.4)	63.2 (17.3)	49.9 (9.9)	34.9 (1.6)	22.4 (−5.3)	46.9 (8.3)
Mean daily minimum °F (°C)	7.5 (−13.6)	11.7 (−11.3)	24.0 (−4.4)	35.5 (1.9)	48.5 (9.2)	59.3 (15.2)	62.3 (16.8)	59.5 (15.3)	50.4 (10.2)	37.5 (3.1)	24.7 (−4.1)	13.6 (−10.2)	36.2 (2.3)
Mean minimum °F (°C)	−14.4 (−25.8)	−9.6 (−23.1)	2.2 (−16.6)	21.3 (−5.9)	34.4 (1.3)	46.7 (8.2)	51.8 (11.0)	49.0 (9.4)	34.5 (1.4)	21.1 (−6.1)	6.9 (−13.9)	−8.8 (−22.7)	−18.3 (−27.9)
Record low °F (°C)	−36 (−38)	−30 (−34)	−25 (−32)	2 (−17)	22 (−6)	32 (0)	41 (5)	35 (2)	21 (−6)	−2 (−19)	−13 (−25)	−29 (−34)	−36 (−38)
Average precipitation inches (mm)	1.02 (26)	1.02 (26)	2.04 (52)	3.41 (87)	4.57 (116)	4.67 (119)	4.02 (102)	4.34 (110)	2.60 (66)	2.28 (58)	1.60 (41)	1.22 (31)	32.79 (834)
Average snowfall inches (cm)	9.3 (24)	7.4 (19)	5.8 (15)	1.9 (4.8)	0.0 (0.0)	0.0 (0.0)	0.0 (0.0)	0.0 (0.0)	0.0 (0.0)	0.4 (1.0)	3.7 (9.4)	10.3 (26)	38.8 (99.2)
Average precipitation days (≥ 0.01 in)	7.0	6.5	8.3	9.9	13.0	11.3	9.0	8.9	8.5	8.1	5.9	6.9	103.3
Average snowy days (≥ 0.1 in)	5.1	4.9	2.8	1.1	0.0	0.0	0.0	0.0	0.0	0.3	2.3	5.0	21.5
Source 1: NOAA
Source 2: National Weather Service

== Demographics ==
Historical population
Census	Pop.	Note	%±
1880	37		—
1900	625		—
1910	987		57.9%
1920	1,302		31.9%
1930	1,308		0.5%
1940	1,730		32.3%
1950	1,949		12.7%
1960	2,011		3.2%
1970	2,338		16.3%
1980	2,352		0.6%
1990	2,085		−11.4%
2000	1,970		−5.5%
2010	1,789		−9.2%
2020	1,867		4.4%
U.S. Decennial Census

=== 2020 census ===
As of the 2020 census, Pocahontas had a population of 1,867, including 846 households and 492 families. The median age was 46.9 years. 21.6% of residents were under the age of 18. The age distribution was 23.9% under the age of 20; 3.8% from 20 to 24; 20.9% from 25 to 44; 23.7% from 45 to 64; and 27.7% who were 65 years of age or older. For every 100 females there were 89.5 males, and for every 100 females age 18 and over there were 89.8 males age 18 and over. The gender makeup of the city was 47.2% male and 52.8% female.

0.0% of residents lived in urban areas, while 100.0% lived in rural areas.

Of the 846 households, 22.8% had children under the age of 18 living in them. Of all households, 45.9% were married-couple households, 5.0% were cohabiting couple households, 19.4% were households with a male householder and no spouse or partner present, and 29.8% were households with a female householder and no spouse or partner present. About 41.8% were non-families, 37.7% were made up of individuals, and 20.8% had someone living alone who was 65 years of age or older.

There were 954 housing units. The population density was 944.8 inhabitants per square mile (364.8/km^{2}), and housing density was 482.8 units per square mile (186.4/km^{2}). Of housing units, 11.3% were vacant. The homeowner vacancy rate was 1.9% and the rental vacancy rate was 12.8%.

Racial composition as of the 2020 census
Race	Number	Percent
White	1,790	95.9%
Black or African American	13	0.7%
American Indian and Alaska Native	3	0.2%
Asian	5	0.3%
Native Hawaiian and Other Pacific Islander	0	0.0%
Some other race	7	0.4%
Two or more races	49	2.6%
Hispanic or Latino (of any race)	14	0.7%

=== 2010 census ===
As of the census of 2010, there were 1,789 people, 852 households, and 493 families residing in the city. The population density was 885.6 inhabitants per square mile (341.9/km^{2}). There were 953 housing units at an average density of 471.8 per square mile (182.2/km^{2}). The racial makeup of the city was 98.3% White, 0.3% African American, 0.1% Native American, 0.1% Asian, 0.1% Pacific Islander, 0.1% from other races, and 1.0% from two or more races. Hispanic or Latino of any race were 1.3% of the population.

There were 852 households, of which 21.6% had children under the age of 18 living with them, 48.0% were married couples living together, 7.2% had a female householder with no husband present, 2.7% had a male householder with no wife present, and 42.1% were non-families. 39.1% of all households were made up of individuals, and 22.4% had someone living alone who was 65 years of age or older. The average household size was 2.04 and the average family size was 2.70.

The median age in the city was 51.1 years. 19.2% of residents were under the age of 18; 5.5% were between the ages of 18 and 24; 16.6% were from 25 to 44; 29.5% were from 45 to 64; and 29.2% were 65 years of age or older. The gender makeup of the city was 46.6% male and 53.4% female.

=== 2000 census ===
As of the census of 2000, there were 1,970 people, 883 households, and 549 families residing in the city. The population density was 1,059.8 inhabitants per square mile (409.2/km^{2}). There were 946 housing units at an average density of 508.9 per square mile (196.5/km^{2}). The racial makeup of the city was 98.68% White, 0.25% African American, 0.15% Native American, 0.10% Asian, 0.20% from other races, and 0.61% from two or more races. Hispanic or Latino of any race were 0.51% of the population.

There were 883 households, out of which 25.8% had children under the age of 18 living with them, 53.3% were married couples living together, 7.1% had a female householder with no husband present, and 37.8% were non-families. 36.1% of all households were made up of individuals, and 24.0% had someone living alone who was 65 years of age or older. The average household size was 2.16 and the average family size was 2.79.

Age spread: 23.1% under the age of 18, 4.8% from 18 to 24, 22.1% from 25 to 44, 25.3% from 45 to 64, and 24.7% who were 65 years of age or older. The median age was 45 years. For every 100 females, there were 84.6 males. For every 100 females age 18 and over, there were 79.1 males.

The median income for a household in the city was $30,865, and the median income for a family was $42,690. Males had a median income of $29,806 versus $19,886 for females. The per capita income for the city was $17,556. About 6.7% of families and 9.1% of the population were below the poverty line, including 12.9% of those under age 18 and 5.9% of those age 65 or over.

== Infrastructure ==
=== Transportation ===
In 1900, a railroad came to Pocahontas. Air transportation for the town is provided by Pocahontas Municipal Airport (FAA Identifier KPOH), located approximately one mile northeast of the city. The airport has two runways, the first is designated 11/29, with a concrete surface 4100 x 60 ft (1250 x 18 m) and runway edge lights, the second is designated 18/36 with a turf surface 1998 x 135 ft (609 x 41 m) and is unlighted.

== Education ==
Pocahontas Area Community School District operates public schools.

== Notable people ==
- Larry Biittner (1946–2022), former Major League Baseball player
- Peg Mullen (1917–2009), anti-war activist and writer
- James V. Schall (1928–2019) Jesuit priest, professor of government at Georgetown University, and prolific Roman Catholic writer
- Alaskan serial killer and baker, Robert Hansen, grew up here, where his parents owned the Pocahontas Home Bakery.

== See also ==
- Saints Peter and Paul Catholic Church, listed on the National Register of Historic Places in Iowa
