= Plover, Iowa =

- City
- Location of Plover, Iowa
- Coordinates: 42°52′41″N 94°37′22″W
- Country: United States
- State: Iowa
- County: Pocahontas

Area
  - Total: 0.56 sq mi (1.45 km^{2})
  - Land: 0.56 sq mi (1.45 km^{2})
  - Water: 0 sq mi (0.00 km^{2})
- Elevation: 1,211 ft (369 m)

Population (2020)
  - Total: 50
  - Density: 89.3/sq mi (34.47/km^{2})
- Time zone: UTC-6 (Central (CST))
  - Summer (DST): UTC-5 (CDT)
- ZIP code: 50573
- Area code: 712
- FIPS code: 19-63840
- GNIS feature ID: 0460323
- Website: ploveriowa.com

Plover is a city in Pocahontas County, Iowa, United States. The population was 50 at the time of the 2020 census.

== History ==
Plover was platted in 1883, soon after the Des Moines and Fort Dodge Railroad was built through that territory. The railroad president named the town after the plover bird.

== Geography ==
Plover is located at 42°52′41″N 94°37′22″W (42.878058, -94.622648).

According to the United States Census Bureau, the city has a total area of 0.54 square miles (1.40 km^{2}), all land.

== Demographics ==
Historical populations
Year	Pop.	±%
1920	246	—
1930	266	+8.1%
1940	280	+5.3%
1950	243	−13.2%
1960	182	−25.1%
1970	129	−29.1%
1980	135	+4.7%
1990	101	−25.2%
2000	95	−5.9%
2010	77	−18.9%
2020	50	−35.1%
Source:"U.S. Census website". United States Census Bureau. and Iowa Data Center; Source: U.S. Decennial Census

=== 2020 census ===
As of the census of 2020, there were 50 people, 29 households, and 18 families residing in the city. The population density was 89.3 inhabitants per square mile (34.5/km^{2}). There were 36 housing units at an average density of 64.3 per square mile (24.8/km^{2}). The racial makeup of the city was 90.0% White, 0.0% Black or African American, 0.0% Native American, 4.0% Asian, 0.0% Pacific Islander, 4.0% from other races and 2.0% from two or more races. Hispanic or Latino persons of any race comprised 0.0% of the population.

Of the 29 households, 34.5% of which had children under the age of 18 living with them, 31.0% were married couples living together, 6.9% were cohabitating couples, 24.1% had a female householder with no spouse or partner present and 37.9% had a male householder with no spouse or partner present. 37.9% of all households were non-families. 34.5% of all households were made up of individuals, 13.8% had someone living alone who was 65 years old or older.

The median age in the city was 50.0 years. 28.0% of the residents were under the age of 20; 8.0% were between the ages of 20 and 24; 12.0% were from 25 and 44; 28.0% were from 45 and 64; and 24.0% were 65 years of age or older. The gender makeup of the city was 50.0% male and 50.0% female.

=== 2010 census ===
As of the census of 2010, there were 77 people, 34 households, and 20 families living in the city. The population density was 142.6 inhabitants per square mile (55.1/km^{2}). There were 44 housing units at an average density of 81.5 per square mile (31.5/km^{2}). The racial makeup of the city was 98.7% White and 1.3% from two or more races.

There were 34 households, of which 26.5% had children under the age of 18 living with them, 55.9% were married couples living together, 2.9% had a female householder with no husband present, and 41.2% were non-families. 38.2% of all households were made up of individuals, and 11.7% had someone living alone who was 65 years of age or older. The average household size was 2.26 and the average family size was 3.05.

The median age in the city was 46.3 years. 24.7% of residents were under the age of 18; 6.5% were between the ages of 18 and 24; 18.2% were from 25 to 44; 32.5% were from 45 to 64; and 18.2% were 65 years of age or older. The gender makeup of the city was 50.6% male and 49.4% female.

=== 2000 census ===
As of the census of 2000, there were 95 people, 43 households, and 30 families living in the city. The population density was 174.8 inhabitants per square mile (67.5/km^{2}). There were 50 housing units at an average density of 92.0 per square mile (35.5/km^{2}). The racial makeup of the city was 97.89% White, 1.05% Asian, and 1.05% from two or more races.

There were 43 households, out of which 23.3% had children under the age of 18 living with them, 62.8% were married couples living together, 4.7% had a female householder with no husband present, and 30.2% were non-families. 30.2% of all households were made up of individuals, and 16.3% had someone living alone who was 65 years of age or older. The average household size was 2.21 and the average family size was 2.70.

In the city, the population was spread out, with 16.8% under the age of 18, 7.4% from 18 to 24, 21.1% from 25 to 44, 31.6% from 45 to 64, and 23.2% who were 65 years of age or older. The median age was 46 years. For every 100 females, there were 111.1 males. For every 100 females age 18 and over, there were 113.5 males.

The median income for a household in the city was $29,306, and the median income for a family was $30,625. Males had a median income of $25,750 versus $26,250 for females. The per capita income for the city was $15,241. There were 17.2% of families and 15.2% of the population living below the poverty line, including 46.7% of under eighteens and none of those over 64.

== Education ==
Pocahontas Area Community School District operates public schools. It was in the Havelock-Plover Community School District until July 1, 1989, when it consolidated into the Pocahontas School District, resulting in the Pocahontas Area School District.
