= Swan Lake Township, Pocahontas County, Iowa =

Township in Pocahontas County, Iowa, U.S.

Coordinates: 42.865°N 94.855°W

Swan Lake Township is a township in Pocahontas County, Iowa, United States.

== History ==
Swan Lake Township was established in 1871. It is named from Swan Lake, a lake which is said to resemble the body of a swan.
