= Colfax Township, Pocahontas County, Iowa =

Township in Iowa, United States

Coordinates: 42.6023°N 94.7372°W

Colfax Township is a township in Pocahontas County, Iowa, United States.

== History ==
Colfax Township was established in 1871. It is named for Schuyler Colfax.
