= Palmer, Iowa =

- City
- Location of Palmer, Iowa
- Coordinates: 42°37′51″N 94°36′0″W
- Country: United States
- State: Iowa
- County: Pocahontas

Area
  - Total: 0.42 sq mi (1.10 km^{2})
  - Land: 0.42 sq mi (1.10 km^{2})
  - Water: 0 sq mi (0.00 km^{2})
- Elevation: 1,240 ft (378 m)

Population (2020)
  - Total: 138
  - Density: 326.1/sq mi (125.91/km^{2})
- Time zone: UTC-6 (Central (CST))
  - Summer (DST): UTC-5 (CDT)
- ZIP code: 50571
- Area code: 712
- FIPS code: 19-61050
- GNIS feature ID: 0459998
- Website: palmeriowa.com

Palmer is a city in Pocahontas County, Iowa, United States. The population was 138 at the time of the 2020 census.

== History ==
Palmer was established in 1899 following the construction of a line of the Chicago, Rock Island and Pacific Railroad through Pocahontas County. The settlement was originally named Hanson before being renamed Palmer.

Palmer was among several communities established or expanded during the late nineteenth-century growth of the county's railroad network. Railroad construction connected the surrounding agricultural region to markets elsewhere in Iowa and contributed to the development of towns throughout the county.

== Geography ==
Palmer is located at 42°37′51″N 94°36′0″W (42.630929, -94.599948).

According to the United States Census Bureau, the city has a total area of 0.42 square miles (1.09 km^{2}), all of it land.

Palmer lies near the center of Manson crater, an impact structure buried by glacial till and outwash.

== Demographics ==
Historical populations
Year	Pop.	±%
1910	177	—
1920	282	+59.3%
1930	297	+5.3%
1940	305	+2.7%
1950	296	−3.0%
1960	271	−8.4%
1970	264	−2.6%
1980	288	+9.1%
1990	230	−20.1%
2000	214	−7.0%
2010	165	−22.9%
2020	138	−16.4%
Source:"U.S. Census website". United States Census Bureau. and Iowa Data Center; Source: U.S. Decennial Census

=== 2020 census ===
As of the census of 2020, there were 138 people, 70 households, and 39 families residing in the city. The population density was 326.1 inhabitants per square mile (125.9/km^{2}). There were 97 housing units at an average density of 229.2 per square mile (88.5/km^{2}). The racial makeup of the city was 93.5% White, 0.0% Black or African American, 0.0% Native American, 0.0% Asian, 0.0% Pacific Islander, 4.3% from other races and 2.2% from two or more races. Hispanic or Latino persons of any race comprised 4.3% of the population.

Of the 70 households, 22.9% of which had children under the age of 18 living with them, 42.9% were married couples living together, 1.4% were cohabitating couples, 22.9% had a female householder with no spouse or partner present and 32.9% had a male householder with no spouse or partner present. 44.3% of all households were non-families. 41.4% of all households were made up of individuals, 22.9% had someone living alone who was 65 years old or older.

The median age in the city was 48.5 years. 21.7% of the residents were under the age of 20; 2.2% were between the ages of 20 and 24; 23.2% were from 25 and 44; 23.2% were from 45 and 64; and 29.7% were 65 years of age or older. The gender makeup of the city was 51.4% male and 48.6% female.

=== 2010 census ===
As of the census of 2010, there were 165 people, 85 households, and 40 families residing in the city. The population density was 392.9 inhabitants per square mile (151.7/km^{2}). There were 102 housing units at an average density of 242.9 per square mile (93.8/km^{2}). The racial makeup of the city was 95.8% White, 0.6% African American, 1.2% Native American, 1.2% from other races, and 1.2% from two or more races. Hispanic or Latino of any race were 1.2% of the population.

There were 85 households, of which 18.8% had children under the age of 18 living with them, 36.5% were married couples living together, 5.9% had a female householder with no husband present, 4.7% had a male householder with no wife present, and 52.9% were non-families. 43.5% of all households were made up of individuals, and 17.6% had someone living alone who was 65 years of age or older. The average household size was 1.94 and the average family size was 2.63.

The median age in the city was 47.8 years. 18.2% of residents were under the age of 18; 6.6% were between the ages of 18 and 24; 20.6% were from 25 to 44; 35.2% were from 45 to 64; and 19.4% were 65 years of age or older. The gender makeup of the city was 50.3% male and 49.7% female.

=== 2000 census ===
As of the census of 2000, there were 214 people, 100 households, and 58 families residing in the city. The population density was 502.8 inhabitants per square mile (194.1/km^{2}). There were 104 housing units at an average density of 244.3 per square mile (94.3/km^{2}). The racial makeup of the city was 95.33% White, 3.74% African American, 0.47% Native American and 0.47% Asian.

There were 100 households, out of which 21.0% had children under the age of 18 living with them, 51.0% were married couples living together, 2.0% had a female householder with no husband present, and 42.0% were non-families. 38.0% of all households were made up of individuals, and 20.0% had someone living alone who was 65 years of age or older. The average household size was 2.14 and the average family size was 2.83.

In the city, the population was spread out, with 22.0% under the age of 18, 6.1% from 18 to 24, 21.5% from 25 to 44, 24.8% from 45 to 64, and 25.7% who were 65 years of age or older. The median age was 45 years. For every 100 females, there were 114.0 males. For every 100 females age 18 and over, there were 114.1 males.

The median income for a household in the city was $25,000, and the median income for a family was $45,250. Males had a median income of $27,778 versus $16,875 for females. The per capita income for the city was $17,775. About 10.9% of families and 16.5% of the population were below the poverty line, including 35.4% of those under the age of eighteen and 5.5% of those 65 or over.

== Education ==
Pocahontas Area Community School District operates public schools. It was in the Palmer School District until July 1, 1993, when it consolidated into the Pomeroy–Palmer Community School District; on July 1, 2012, that district consolidated into the Pocahontas Area School District.

== Sports ==
Palmer had many successful semi-pro baseball teams in the heyday of town teams.

Palmer's high school boys' basketball team had a long run of success in the 1980s, winning three straight state championships from 1986 to 1988. Its teams scored record numbers of points, and its games were played in front of packed crowds. Ultimately, the team won 103 straight games, setting the state record.
