= Grant Township, Pocahontas County, Iowa =

Township in Pocahontas County, Iowa, U.S.

Coordinates: 42.6883°N 94.7381°W

Grant Township is a township in Pocahontas County, Iowa, United States.

== History ==
Grant Township was established in 1870. It is named for President Ulysses S. Grant.
