= Bellville Township, Pocahontas County, Iowa =

Township in Pocahontas County, Iowa, U.S.

Coordinates: 42.6024°N 94.6192°W

Bellville Township is a township in Pocahontas County, Iowa, United States.

== History ==
Bellville Township is named for William Bell, a pioneer settler.
