= Pomeroy–Palmer Community School District =

Defunct school district in Iowa, US

Pomeroy–Palmer Community School District was a school district headquartered in Pomeroy, Iowa, serving that city and Palmer.

It was established by the July 1, 1993, merger of the Pomeroy School District and the Palmer School District.

Circa 2012 there were around slightly more than 200 students at the Pomeroy school. At one point the Pomeroy–Palmer district established a grade-sharing arrangement, in which one district sends its students to another district's school, with the Pocahontas Area Community School District. On July 1, 2012, the Pomeroy–Palmer district consolidated into the Pocahontas Area district. The Pocahontas district kept the Pomeroy school open after the merger.
