= Sherman Township, Pocahontas County, Iowa =

Township in Pocahontas County, Iowa, U.S.

Coordinates: 42.777°N 94.739°W

Sherman Township is a township in Pocahontas County, Iowa, United States.

== History ==
Sherman Township was established in 1880. It is named for William Tecumseh Sherman.
