= Whittemore Township, Kossuth County, Iowa =

Township in Kossuth County, Iowa, U.S.

Coordinates: 43.0392°N 94.3836°W

Whittemore Township is a township in Kossuth County, Iowa, United States.

== History ==
Whittemore Township was organized in 1885.
