= Lake Township, Pocahontas County, Iowa =

Township in Pocahontas County, Iowa, U.S.

Coordinates: 42.689°N 94.502°W

Lake Township is a township in Pocahontas County, Iowa, United States.

== History ==
Lake Township was established in June 1877 as Burke Township. A few months later it was renamed to Lake from several small lakes located within its borders.
