= Center Township, Pocahontas County, Iowa =

Township in Pocahontas County, Iowa, U.S.

Coordinates: 42.741°N 94.665°W

Center Township is a township in Pocahontas County, Iowa, United States.

== History ==
Center Township was established in 1874.
