= Powhatan Township, Pocahontas County, Iowa =

Township in Pocahontas County, Iowa, U.S.

Coordinates: 42.8647°N 94.6197°W

Powhatan Township is a township in Pocahontas County, Iowa, United States.

== History ==
Powhatan Township was established in 1866 as Nunda Township, as some of its first citizens were natives of Nunda, New York. However, the name Nunda was not popular with the majority, and so in 1867, the township was renamed to honor Chief Powhatan, father of Pocahontas.
