= Havelock, Iowa =

- City
- Location of Havelock, Iowa
- Coordinates: 42°50′0″N 94°42′6″W
- Country: United States
- State: Iowa
- County: Pocahontas

Area
  - Total: 0.56 sq mi (1.45 km^{2})
  - Land: 0.56 sq mi (1.45 km^{2})
  - Water: 0 sq mi (0.00 km^{2})
- Elevation: 1,230 ft (375 m)

Population (2020)
  - Total: 130
  - Density: 232.6/sq mi (89.81/km^{2})
- Time zone: UTC-6 (Central (CST))
  - Summer (DST): UTC-5 (CDT)
- ZIP code: 50546
- Area code: 712
- FIPS code: 19-35130
- GNIS feature ID: 0457320
- Website: www.havelockia.com

Havelock is a city in Pocahontas County, Iowa, United States. The population was 130 at the time of the 2020 census.

== History ==
Havelock was platted in 1881. It is named for Henry Havelock.

== Geography ==
Havelock is located at 42°50′0″N 94°42′6″W (42.833367, -94.701762).

According to the United States Census Bureau, the city has a total area of 0.57 square miles (1.48 km^{2}), all land.

== Demographics ==
Historical populations
Year	Pop.	±%
1900	397	—
1910	241	−39.3%
1920	331	+37.3%
1930	339	+2.4%
1940	326	−3.8%
1950	307	−5.8%
1960	289	−5.9%
1970	248	−14.2%
1980	279	+12.5%
1990	217	−22.2%
2000	177	−18.4%
2010	138	−22.0%
2020	130	−5.8%
Source:"U.S. Census website". United States Census Bureau. and Iowa Data Center; Source: U.S. Decennial Census

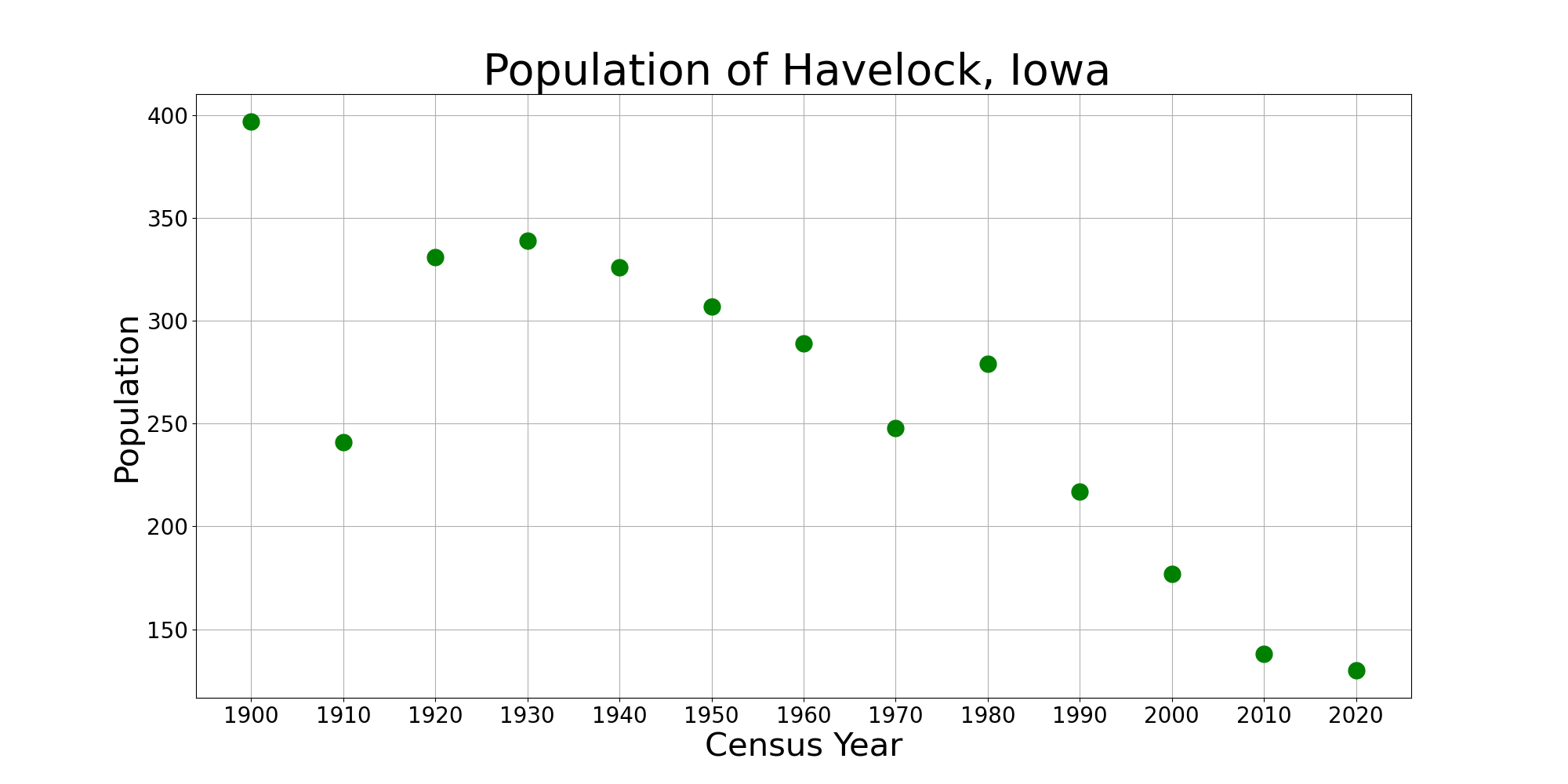
The population of Havelock, Iowa from US census data

=== 2020 census ===
As of the census of 2020, there were 130 people, 55 households, and 27 families residing in the city. The population density was 232.6 inhabitants per square mile (89.8/km^{2}). There were 82 housing units at an average density of 146.7 per square mile (56.6/km^{2}). The racial makeup of the city was 83.1% White, 0.0% Black or African American, 0.0% Native American, 0.0% Asian, 0.0% Pacific Islander, 7.7% from other races and 9.2% from two or more races. Hispanic or Latino persons of any race comprised 12.3% of the population.

Of the 55 households, 20.0% of which had children under the age of 18 living with them, 40.0% were married couples living together, 1.8% were cohabiting couples, 27.3% had a female householder with no spouse or partner present and 30.9% had a male householder with no spouse or partner present. 50.9% of all households were non-families. 47.3% of all households were made up of individuals, 12.7% had someone living alone who was 65 years old or older.

The median age in the city was 37.0 years. 29.2% of the residents were under the age of 20; 3.8% were between the ages of 20 and 24; 26.2% were from 25 and 44; 21.5% were from 45 and 64; and 19.2% were 65 years of age or older. The gender makeup of the city was 50.8% male and 49.2% female.

=== 2010 census ===
At the 2010 census there were 138 people in 65 households, including 35 families, in the city. The population density was 242.1 inhabitants per square mile (93.5/km^{2}). There were 87 housing units at an average density of 152.6 per square mile (58.9/km^{2}). The racial makup of the city was 92.8% White, 1.4% Native American, 0.7% Asian, 0.7% Pacific Islander, and 4.3% from two or more races. Hispanic or Latino of any race were 6.5%.

Of the 65 households 21.5% had children under the age of 18 living with them, 40.0% were married couples living together, 7.7% had a female householder with no husband present, 6.2% had a male householder with no wife present, and 46.2% were non-families. 38.5% of households were one person and 15.4% were one person aged 65 or older. The average household size was 2.12 and the average family size was 2.74.

The median age was 43.3 years. 18.8% of residents were under the age of 18; 12.4% were between the ages of 18 and 24; 21.7% were from 25 to 44; 32.6% were from 45 to 64; and 14.5% were 65 or older. The gender makeup of the city was 49.3% male and 50.7% female.

=== 2000 census ===
At the 2000 census there were 177 people in 82 households, including 44 families, in the city. The population density was 314.3 inhabitants per square mile (121.4/km^{2}). There were 95 housing units at an average density of 168.7 per square mile (65.1/km^{2}). The racial makup of the city was 97.74% White, and 2.26% from two or more races. Of the 82 households 24.4% had children under the age of 18 living with them, 45.1% were married couples living together, 6.1% had a female householder with no husband present, and 46.3% were non-families. 42.7% of households were one person and 25.6% were one person aged 65 or older. The average household size was 2.16 and the average family size was 3.05.

The age distribution was 24.9% under the age of 18, 7.3% from 18 to 24, 24.3% from 25 to 44, 19.2% from 45 to 64, and 24.3% 65 or older. The median age was 42 years. For every 100 females, there were 90.3 males. For every 100 females age 18 and over, there were 92.8 males.

The median household income was $28,462 and the median family income was $32,917. Males had a median income of $25,469 versus $24,375 for females. The per capita income for the city was $11,548. About 6.4% of families and 12.8% of the population were below the poverty line, including 7.5% of those under the age of eighteen and 24.4% of those sixty five or over.

== Education ==
Pocahontas Area Community School District operates public schools. It was in the Havelock-Plover Community School District until July 1, 1989, when it consolidated into the Pocahontas School District, resulting in the Pocahontas Area School District.
