= Rolfe, Iowa =

- City
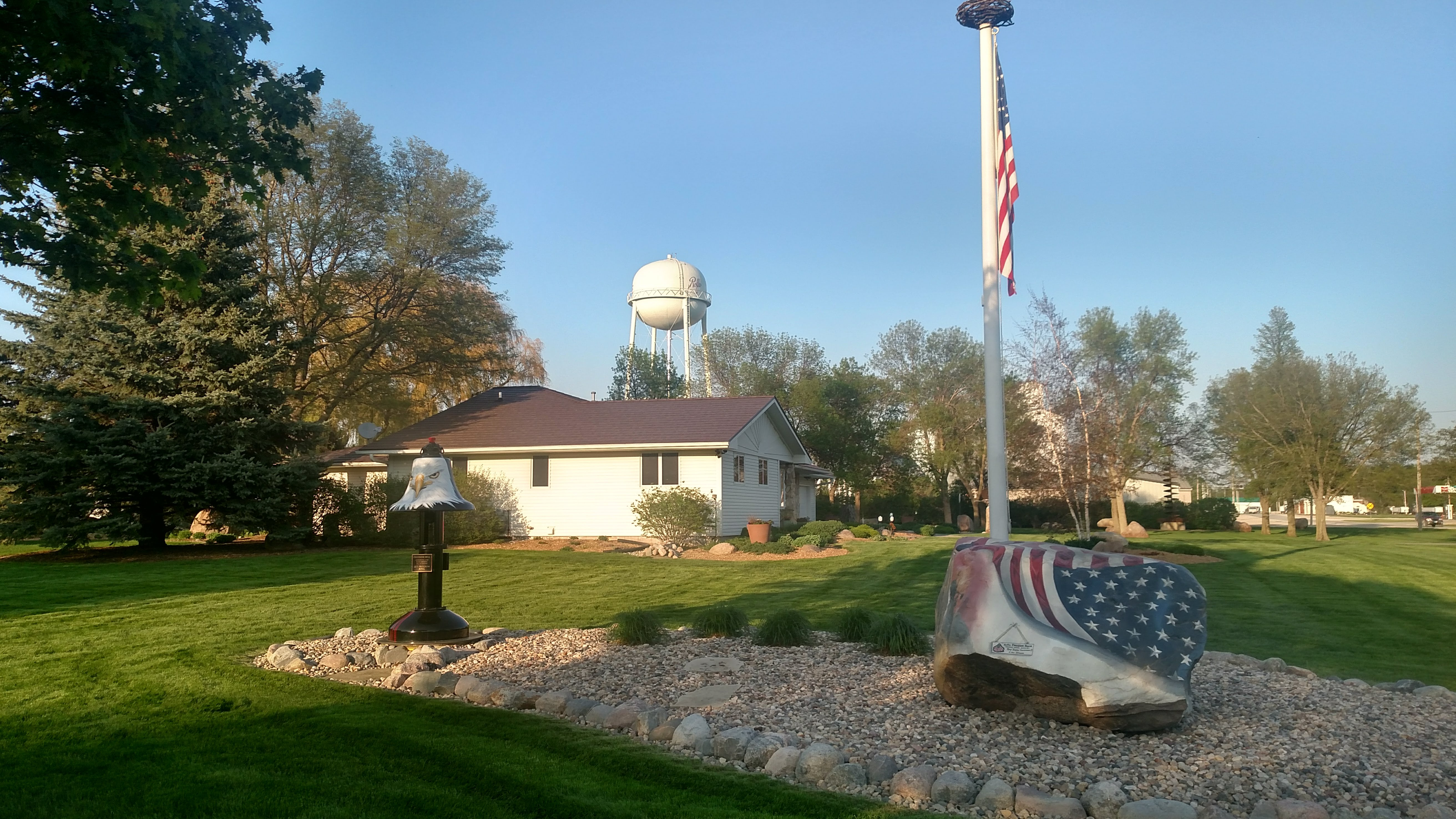
- Freedom Rock in Rolfe

- Location of Rolfe, Iowa
- Coordinates: 42°48′52″N 94°31′48″W
- Country: United States
- State: Iowa
- County: Pocahontas

Area
  - Total: 1.05 sq mi (2.73 km^{2})
  - Land: 1.05 sq mi (2.73 km^{2})
  - Water: 0 sq mi (0.00 km^{2})
- Elevation: 1,184 ft (361 m)

Population (2020)
  - Total: 509
  - Density: 483.2/sq mi (186.57/km^{2})
- Time zone: UTC-6 (Central (CST))
  - Summer (DST): UTC-5 (CDT)
- ZIP code: 50581
- Area code: 712
- FIPS code: 19-68520
- GNIS feature ID: 0460770
- Website: www.rolfeiowa.com

Rolfe is a city in Pocahontas County, Iowa, United States. The population was 509 at the time of the 2020 census.

This city was named after the Englishman John Rolfe, who married Pocahontas in Jamestown, Virginia.

== History ==
Rolfe was platted in 1881 at the junction of two railroads.

== Geography ==
Rolfe is located at 42°48′52″N 94°31′48″W (42.814333, -94.530029).

According to the United States Census Bureau, the city has a total area of 1.05 square miles (2.72 km^{2}), all land.

== Demographics ==
Historical populations
Year	Pop.	±%
1890	529	—
1900	994	+87.9%
1910	954	−4.0%
1920	1,031	+8.1%
1930	1,012	−1.8%
1940	1,122	+10.9%
1950	997	−11.1%
1960	819	−17.9%
1970	767	−6.3%
1980	796	+3.8%
1990	721	−9.4%
2000	675	−6.4%
2010	584	−13.5%
2020	509	−12.8%
Source:"U.S. Census website". United States Census Bureau. and Iowa Data Center; Source: U.S. Decennial Census

=== 2020 census ===
As of the census of 2020, there were 509 people, 222 households, and 139 families residing in the city. The population density was 483.2 inhabitants per square mile (186.6/km^{2}). There were 294 housing units at an average density of 279.1 per square mile (107.8/km^{2}). The racial makeup of the city was 91.6% White, 2.0% Black or African American, 0.2% Native American, 0.0% Asian, 0.0% Pacific Islander, 3.7% from other races and 2.6% from two or more races. Hispanic or Latino persons of any race comprised 5.1% of the population.

Of the 222 households, 24.3% of which had children under the age of 18 living with them, 48.2% were married couples living together, 9.5% were cohabitating couples, 23.0% had a female householder with no spouse or partner present and 19.4% had a male householder with no spouse or partner present. 37.4% of all households were non-families. 30.2% of all households were made up of individuals, 13.5% had someone living alone who was 65 years old or older.

The median age in the city was 43.2 years. 25.1% of the residents were under the age of 20; 5.3% were between the ages of 20 and 24; 22.0% were from 25 and 44; 26.1% were from 45 and 64; and 21.4% were 65 years of age or older. The gender makeup of the city was 48.5% male and 51.5% female.

=== 2010 census ===
As of the census of 2010, there were 584 people, 248 households, and 159 families living in the city. The population density was 556.2 inhabitants per square mile (214.8/km^{2}). There were 305 housing units at an average density of 290.5 per square mile (112.2/km^{2}). The racial makeup of the city was 97.3% White, 0.5% African American, 1.0% from other races, and 1.2% from two or more races. Hispanic or Latino of any race were 2.4% of the population.

There were 248 households, of which 25.8% had children under the age of 18 living with them, 47.2% were married couples living together, 12.5% had a female householder with no husband present, 4.4% had a male householder with no wife present, and 35.9% were non-families. 29.8% of all households were made up of individuals, and 15.3% had someone living alone who was 65 years of age or older. The average household size was 2.25 and the average family size was 2.72.

The median age in the city was 46 years. 22.4% of residents were under the age of 18; 6.8% were between the ages of 18 and 24; 20% were from 25 to 44; 27.7% were from 45 to 64; and 23.3% were 65 years of age or older. The gender makeup of the city was 49.1% male and 50.9% female.

=== 2000 census ===
As of the census of 2000, there were 675 people, 296 households, and 185 families living in the city. The population density was 643.9 inhabitants per square mile (248.6/km^{2}). There were 326 housing units at an average density of 311.0 per square mile (120.1/km^{2}). The racial makeup of the city was 97.63% White, 0.44% African American, 0.30% Native American, 0.15% Asian, 0.44% from other races, and 1.04% from two or more races. Hispanic or Latino of any race were 1.04% of the population.

There were 296 households, out of which 24.3% had children under the age of 18 living with them, 52.4% were married couples living together, 7.4% had a female householder with no husband present, and 37.2% were non-families. 34.5% of all households were made up of individuals, and 21.6% had someone living alone who was 65 years of age or older. The average household size was 2.20 and the average family size was 2.85.

In the city, the population was spread out, with 22.7% under the age of 18, 6.4% from 18 to 24, 21.0% from 25 to 44, 22.7% from 45 to 64, and 27.3% who were 65 years of age or older. The median age was 45 years. For every 100 females, there were 94.0 males. For every 100 females age 18 and over, there were 86.4 males.

The median income for a household in the city was $24,861, and the median income for a family was $32,500. Males had a median income of $28,750 versus $19,167 for females. The per capita income for the city was $12,426. About 9.7% of families and 12.5% of the population were below the poverty line, including 15.2% of those under age 18 and 11.9% of those age 65 or over.

== Education ==
Pocahontas Area Community School District operates public schools. It was in the Rolfe Community School District until July 1, 1993, when it consolidated into the Pocahontas Area School District.
