= Pocahontas County, Iowa =

County in Iowa, United States

- County
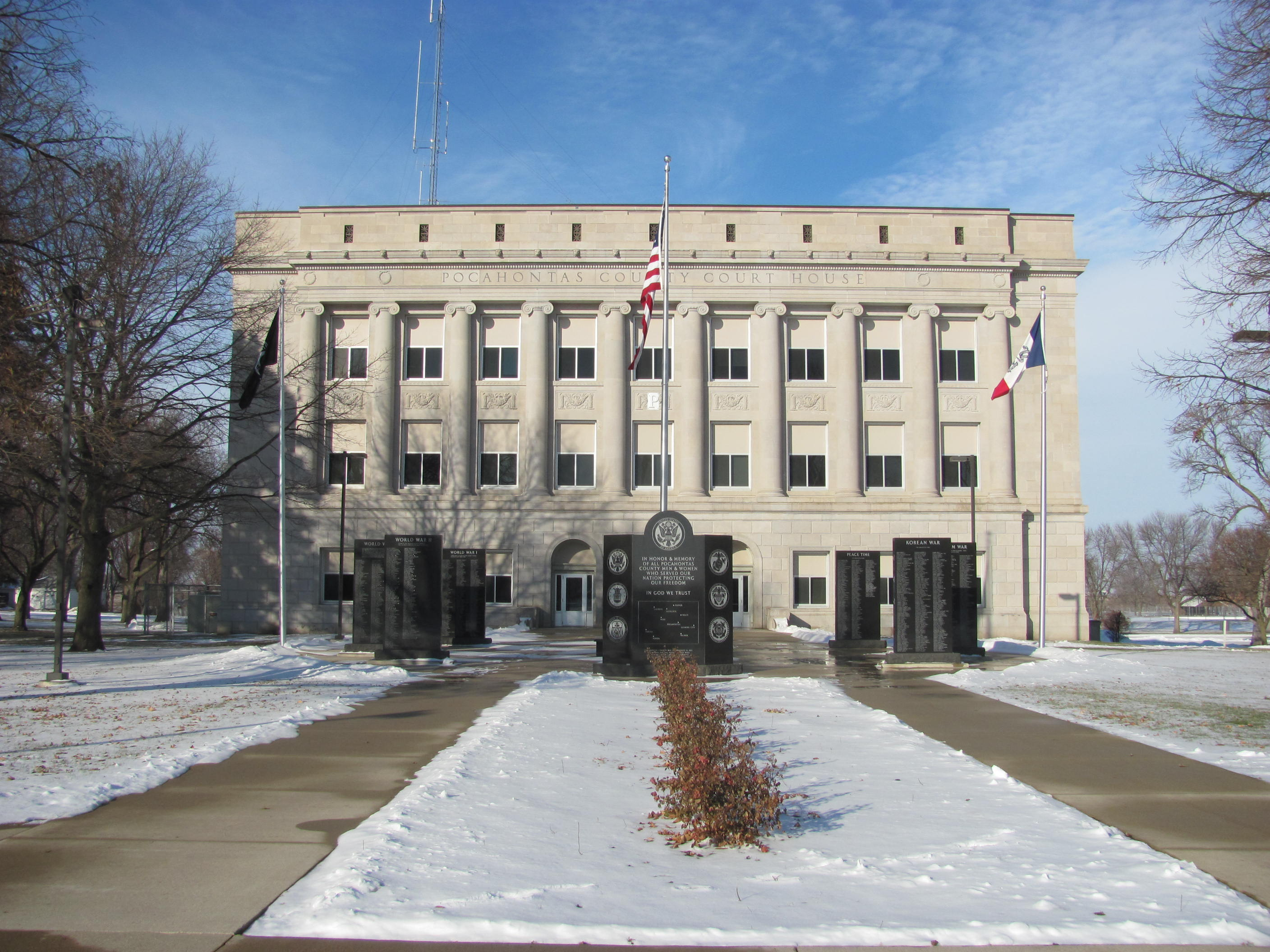
- The Pocahontas County Courthouse in Pocahontas

- Location within the U.S. state of Iowa
- Coordinates: 42.734033°N 94.678279°W
- Country: United States
- State: Iowa
- Founded: January 15, 1851 (created); May 11, 1859 (organized)
- Named for: Pocahontas
- Seat: Pocahontas
- Largest city: Pocahontas

Area
  - Total: 578.657 sq mi (1,498.71 km^{2})
  - Land: 577.241 sq mi (1,495.05 km^{2})
  - Water: 1.416 sq mi (3.67 km^{2}) 0.24%

Population (2020)
  - Total: 7,078
  - Estimate (2025): 6,819 ▼
  - Density: 12.26/sq mi (4.734/km^{2})
- Time zone: UTC−6 (Central)
  - Summer (DST): UTC−5 (CDT)
- Area code: 712
- Congressional district: 4th
- Website: pocahontascounty.iowa.gov
- Iowa county number 76

Pocahontas County is a county in the U.S. state of Iowa. As of the 2020 census the population was 7,078, and was estimated to be 6,819 in 2025, making it the ninth-least populous county in Iowa. The county seat and the largest city is Pocahontas.

== History ==
Pocahontas county was formed on January 15, 1851 and organized on May 11, 1859. The county is named in honor of Pocahontas, the famous Native American woman from Jamestown, Virginia. A colossal statue of her stands in the City of Pocahontas.

== Geography ==
According to the United States Census Bureau, the county has a total area of 578.657 square miles (1,498.71 km^{2}), of which 577.241 square miles (1,495.05 km^{2}) is land and 1.416 square miles (3.67 km^{2}) (0.24%) is water. It is the 34th-largest county in Iowa by total area.

=== Major highways ===
- Iowa Highway 3
- Iowa Highway 4
- Iowa Highway 7
- Iowa Highway 10
- Iowa Highway 15

=== Adjacent counties ===
- Palo Alto County (north)
- Humboldt County (east)
- Webster County (southeast)
- Calhoun County (south)
- Buena Vista County (west)

== Demographics ==
Historical population
Census	Pop.	Note	%±
1860	103		—
1870	1,446		1,303.9%
1880	3,713		156.8%
1890	9,553		157.3%
1900	15,339		60.6%
1910	14,808		−3.5%
1920	15,602		5.4%
1930	15,687		0.5%
1940	16,266		3.7%
1950	15,496		−4.7%
1960	14,234		−8.1%
1970	12,729		−10.6%
1980	11,369		−10.7%
1990	9,525		−16.2%
2000	8,662		−9.1%
2010	7,310		−15.6%
2020	7,078		−3.2%
2025 (est.)	6,819	▼	−3.7%
U.S. Decennial Census; 1790–1960 1900–1990; 1990–2000 2010–2020

Pocahontas County, Iowa racial and ethnic composition Note: the US Census treats Hispanic/Latino as an ethnic category. This table excludes Latinos from the racial categories and assigns them to a separate category. Hispanics/Latinos may be of any race.
Race	Number	Percent
White alone (NH)	6,383	90.18%
Black or African American alone (NH)	66	0.93%
Native American or Alaska Native alone (NH)	10	0.14%
Asian alone (NH)	29	0.41%
Pacific Islander alone (NH)	23	0.32%
Other race alone (NH)	24	0.34%
Mixed race or multiracial (NH)	189	2.67%
Hispanic or Latino (any race)	354	5.00%
Total	7,078	100.00%

=== 2020 census ===
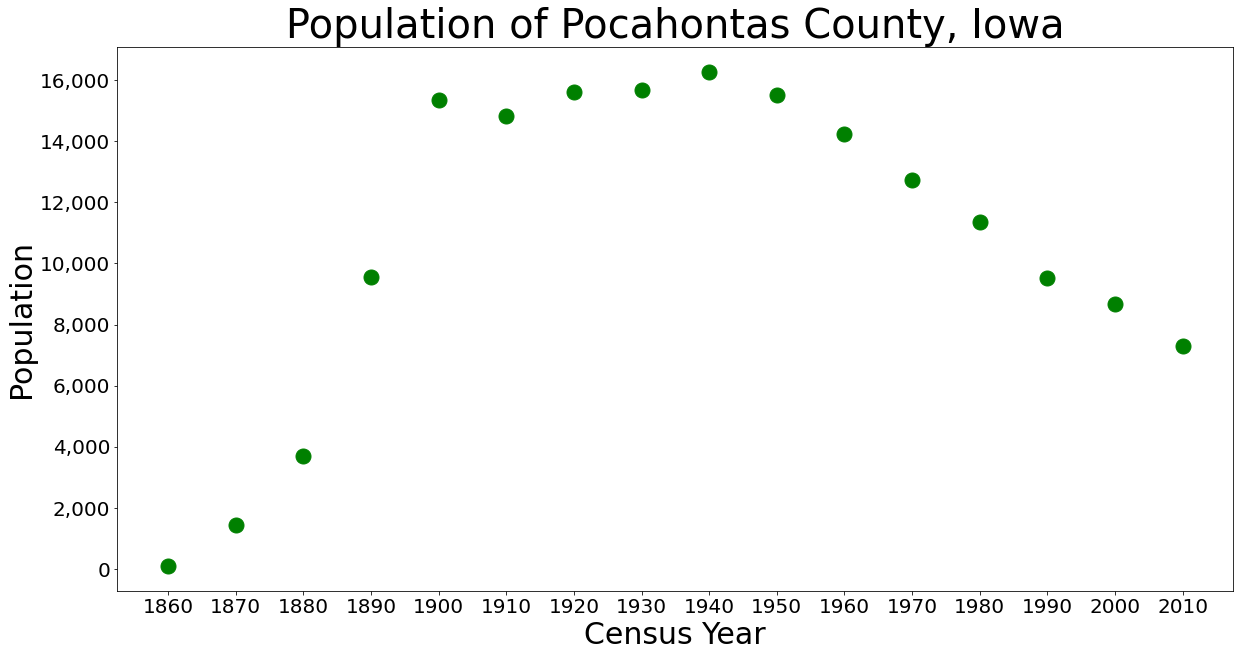
Population of Pocahontas County from the U.S. census data

As of the 2020 census, the county had a population of 7,078, a population density of 12.2/sq mi (4.7/km^{2}), and 95.79% of residents reported being of one race.

The median age was 45.3 years, 22.7% of residents were under the age of 18, and 24.0% of residents were 65 years of age or older. For every 100 females there were 100.5 males, and for every 100 females age 18 and over there were 101.4 males age 18 and over.

The racial makeup of the county was 91.3% White, 0.9% Black or African American, 0.3% American Indian and Alaska Native, 0.4% Asian, 0.3% Native Hawaiian and Pacific Islander, 2.6% from some other race, and 4.2% from two or more races. Hispanic or Latino residents of any race comprised 5.0% of the population.

Less than 0.1% of residents lived in urban areas, while 100.0% lived in rural areas.

There were 3,090 households in the county, of which 25.1% had children under the age of 18 living in them. Of all households, 51.2% were married-couple households, 21.2% were households with a male householder and no spouse or partner present, and 21.9% were households with a female householder and no spouse or partner present. About 32.6% of all households were made up of individuals and 16.0% had someone living alone who was 65 years of age or older.

There were 3,666 housing units, of which 15.7% were vacant. Among occupied housing units, 78.3% were owner-occupied and 21.7% were renter-occupied. The homeowner vacancy rate was 2.4% and the rental vacancy rate was 17.9%.

=== 2010 census ===
As of the 2010 census recorded a population of 7,310 in the county, with a population density of 12.7/sq mi (4.9/km^{2}). There were 3,794 housing units, of which 3,233 were occupied.

=== 2000 census ===
As of the 2000 census, there were 8,662 people, 3,617 households, and 2,430 families residing in the county. The population density was 15 people per square mile (5.8 people/km^{2}). There were 3,988 housing units at an average density of 7 units per square mile (2.7 units/km^{2}). The racial makeup of the county was 98.49% White, 0.24% Black or African American, 0.17% Native American, 0.17% Asian, 0.01% Pacific Islander, 0.30% from other races, and 0.61% from two or more races. 0.89% of the population were Hispanic or Latino of any race.

There were 3,617 households, out of which 29.50% had children under the age of 18 living with them, 58.30% were married couples living together, 5.90% had a female householder with no husband present, and 32.80% were non-families. 30.20% of all households were made up of individuals, and 17.80% had someone living alone who was 65 years of age or older. The average household size was 2.35 and the average family size was 2.91.

In the county, the population was spread out, with 25.40% under the age of 18, 5.30% from 18 to 24, 23.40% from 25 to 44, 24.10% from 45 to 64, and 21.70% who were 65 years of age or older. The median age was 42 years. For every 100 females there were 96.60 males. For every 100 females age 18 and over, there were 93.20 males.

The median income for a household in the county was $33,362, and the median income for a family was $40,568. Males had a median income of $27,929 versus $20,515 for females. The per capita income for the county was $17,006. About 6.60% of families and 9.10% of the population were below the poverty line, including 12.30% of those under age 18 and 6.50% of those age 65 or over.

== Communities ==
=== Cities ===
- Fonda
- Gilmore City
- Havelock
- Laurens
- Palmer
- Plover
- Pocahontas
- Rolfe
- Varina

=== Unincorporated communities ===
- Ware

=== Townships ===
- Bellville
- Cedar
- Center
- Colfax
- Cummins
- Des Moines
- Dover
- Garfield
- Grant
- Lake
- Lincoln
- Lizard
- Marshall
- Powhatan
- Roosevelt
- Sherman
- Swan Lake

=== Population ranking ===
The population ranking of the following table is based on the 2020 census of Pocahontas County.

† county seat

Rank	City/Town/etc.	Municipal type	Population (2020 Census)
1	† Pocahontas	City	1,867
2	Laurens	City	1,264
3	Fonda	City	636
4	Rolfe	City	509
5	Gilmore City (partially in Humboldt County)	City	217 (487 total)
6	Palmer	City	138
7	Havelock	City	130
8	Varina	City	68
9	Plover	City	50

== Politics ==
Between 1928 and 2004, Pocahontas County was a reliable bellwether county, backing the nationwide winner in every election except for 1960 (by only 37 votes) and 1988. The county has taken a rightward turn in the 21st century. After backing George W. Bush in 2000 and 2004, John McCain in 2008, and Mitt Romney in 2012 by sizable but not huge margins, Pocahontas County swung even further right in 2016. Donald Trump took nearly 70% of the vote share in the county and won the county by an astounding 45% margin. Trump further increased these numbers in 2020, winning almost 74% of the county's vote and increasing his margin of victory to just under 50%, and did even better in 2024, earning more than 76% of the vote and winning by nearly 54%, both records for Pocahontas County for any candidate since the beginning of the 20th century.

United States presidential election results for Pocahontas County, Iowa
Year	Republican		Democratic		Third party(ies)	
Year	No.	%	No.	%	No.	%
1896	1,866	56.82%	1,377	41.93%	41	1.25%
1900	2,176	61.84%	1,287	36.57%	56	1.59%
1904	2,175	66.09%	976	29.66%	140	4.25%
1908	1,857	57.42%	1,315	40.66%	62	1.92%
1912	760	22.95%	1,176	35.52%	1,375	41.53%
1916	1,808	51.29%	1,658	47.04%	59	1.67%
1920	4,046	70.07%	1,639	28.39%	89	1.54%
1924	2,537	39.65%	819	12.80%	3,042	47.55%
1928	3,322	53.75%	2,824	45.70%	34	0.55%
1932	1,800	28.48%	4,245	67.16%	276	4.37%
1936	2,277	33.39%	4,357	63.89%	185	2.71%
1940	2,985	41.92%	4,118	57.83%	18	0.25%
1944	2,600	41.94%	3,577	57.70%	22	0.35%
1948	2,397	39.61%	3,500	57.84%	154	2.55%
1952	4,472	61.73%	2,517	34.74%	256	3.53%
1956	3,606	52.89%	3,201	46.95%	11	0.16%
1960	3,445	50.23%	3,408	49.69%	6	0.09%
1964	2,079	34.24%	3,988	65.68%	5	0.08%
1968	2,940	52.56%	2,364	42.26%	290	5.18%
1972	3,138	57.19%	2,241	40.84%	108	1.97%
1976	2,700	45.85%	3,055	51.88%	134	2.28%
1980	3,194	56.17%	1,959	34.45%	533	9.37%
1984	2,627	50.64%	2,481	47.82%	80	1.54%
1988	1,871	40.22%	2,722	58.51%	59	1.27%
1992	1,743	37.33%	1,919	41.10%	1,007	21.57%
1996	1,707	40.50%	1,981	47.00%	527	12.50%
2000	2,242	54.14%	1,736	41.92%	163	3.94%
2004	2,441	56.60%	1,822	42.24%	50	1.16%
2008	2,138	53.29%	1,800	44.87%	74	1.84%
2012	2,396	59.42%	1,523	37.77%	113	2.80%
2016	2,702	69.91%	963	24.92%	200	5.17%
2020	2,826	73.92%	933	24.40%	64	1.67%
2024	2,727	76.13%	796	22.22%	59	1.65%

== See also ==
- Pocahontas County Courthouse
- National Register of Historic Places listings in Pocahontas County, Iowa
- Manson crater
