= List of United States tornadoes in April 2011 =

This is a list of all tornadoes that were confirmed by local offices of the National Weather Service in the United States in April 2011. It was, by a wide margin, the most active tornado month in United States history, with 782 tornadoes being confirmed from April 4 to April 30. The first tornado event of the month accompanied a large-scale damaging wind event, during which eight people were killed by falling trees. The severe weather outbreak also produced 46 tornadoes, mainly across Arkansas, Kentucky, and Mississippi. Tornado activity continued into early April 5, where an EF2 tornado in Dodge County, Georgia, resulted in one fatality. A couple tornadoes, EF1 and EF2, struck Pulaski County, Virginia, on April 8, ahead of a second outbreak from April 9–11. This outbreak significantly impacted the Upper Midwest, including Iowa and Wisconsin. Iowa was struck by numerous tornadoes on April 9, including three rated EF3 and one rated EF4, mainly affecting Sac, Buena Vista, and Pocahontas counties. Sixteen tornadoes touched down in Wisconsin on April 10, including an EF3 tornado that struck Merrill, ranking the outbreak as the state's largest April event on record as well as one of the largest single-day outbreaks ever. Although no one was killed, nineteen people were injured during the outbreak.

April 14–16 brought a much larger tornado outbreak across the Southern United States, with 178 tornadoes from Oklahoma to Virginia. A multiple-vortex EF3 tornado struck Tushka and Atoka, Oklahoma on April 14, resulting in major damage and two fatalities. Two more people were killed in Little Rock, Arkansas just after midnight. During the late morning and afternoon of April 15, multiple strong tornadoes impacted Mississippi and Alabama, including six EF3 tornadoes that hit places such as Clinton, Mississippi; Leakesville, Mississippi; De Kalb, Mississippi; Geiger, Alabama; Tuscaloosa, Alabama; and Pine Level, Alabama. In total, twelve people were killed on April 14–15, while 26 more fatalities occurred across North Carolina and Virginia on April 16. Major tornado damage occurred in and around Sanford, Raleigh, Fayetteville, Askewville, and Snow Hill, North Carolina, along with Deltaville and Clopton, Virginia. Like the previous day, April 16 also featured six EF3 tornadoes. Another period of elevated tornado activity took place from April 19–24, with 132 tornadoes over six days. Although the events featured mostly weaker tornadoes, an intense EF3 tornado injured two people in Illinois on April 19 and a violent EF4 tornado struck suburbs of St. Louis, Missouri, causing multiple injuries and severely impacting Lambert–St. Louis International Airport. Weaker activity on April 23–24 led into a much larger outbreak.

Approximate touchdown location of tornadoes from April 25–28, 2011, with violent EF4+ tornadoes highlighted
Interactive map
- Tornadoes on April 25
- Tornadoes on April 26
- Tornadoes on April 27 (EF0–EF3)
- Tornadoes on April 28
- EF4 tornadoes on April 27
- EF5 tornadoes on April 27

From April 25–28, 367 tornadoes occurred across 21 states in the Southern, Midwestern, and Northeastern United States in what became known as the 2011 Super Outbreak. Numerous tornadoes touched down across Texas and Arkansas on April 25, including an EF3 tornado near Hot Springs Village, Arkansas that caused significant damage and killed one person and a long-track EF2 tornado in the Vilonia, Arkansas area that killed four people and injured 16 others while staying down for over an hour. April 26 saw mostly weaker tornadoes and no fatalities, with the notable tornadoes of the day being an EF2 tornado that tracked across parts of Texas and into Louisiana and a brief EF3 tornado that struck Campbell Army Airfield. From the 27th to early on the 28th, a series of devastating, long-tracked, violent tornadoes killed over 300 people throughout an area extending from Mississippi to Virginia. This included eleven tornadoes rated EF4 and four rated EF5. One particularly devastating and long-lived EF5 wedge tornado tore across northern Alabama and into Tennessee, killing 71 people, while a large, long-tracked EF4 wedge tornado caused catastrophic damage in densely populated areas of Tuscaloosa and Birmingham, Alabama, killing 64 people. Over 215 tornadoes occurred on April 27 alone.

Numerous other small towns including Smithville, Mississippi; Cordova, Alabama; Rainsville, Alabama; Ohatchee, Alabama; Cullman, Alabama; Trenton, Georgia; Ringgold, Georgia; Apison, Tennessee; and Glade Spring, Virginia sustained devastating, direct hits from intense tornadoes during the outbreak, with several producing death tolls well into the double digits. 319 tornado-related deaths occurred from April 27–28, bringing the total death toll from April 25–28 to 324 from 31 separate tornadoes; 24 additional fatalities occurred from separate thunderstorm impacts. The outbreak continued during the overnight and into the morning of April 28, with 47 more tornadoes occurring from Florida to New York. Most of the tornadoes very relatively weak and caused comparatively minor damage. Much of the tornado activity ceased by mid-morning, with only ten tornadoes occurring during the afternoon as the outbreak came to an end. This exceptional outbreak was followed by three weak tornadoes in Texas on April 30 to end the month.

During the course of the month, 363 people were killed as a direct result of 43 different tornadoes, while over 3,700 people were injured; most of the casualties occurred on April 27.

== United States yearly total ==
Confirmed tornadoes by Enhanced Fujita rating
EFU	EF0	EF1	EF2	EF3	EF4	EF5	Total
0	802	629	199	62	17	6	1,721

== April ==
Confirmed tornadoes by Enhanced Fujita rating
EFU	EF0	EF1	EF2	EF3	EF4	EF5	Total
0	276	337	111	41	13	4	782

=== April 4 event ===
List of confirmed tornadoes – Monday, April 4, 2011 (Note: All dates are based on the local time zone where the tornado touched down; however, all times are in Coordinated Universal Time and dates are split at midnight CDT for consistency.)
EF#	Location	County / Parish	State	Start Coord.	Time (UTC)	Path length	Max width	Damage (Note: All damage totals are in 2011 USD unless otherwise stated.)
EF1	E of Ashdown	Little River	AR	33.675°N 94.096°W	13:10–13:15	4.84 mi (7.79 km)	150 yd (140 m)	$25,000
EF1	A metal building with a steel beam frame was completely destroyed, a carport was collapsed, and many trees were snapped or uprooted.							
EF1	NNE of Hope	Hempstead	AR	33.701°N 93.586°W	13:38–13:41	3.89 mi (6.26 km)	100 yd (91 m)	$300,000
EF1	A tractor trailer was flipped over, roofing was pulled from a barn and nine chicken houses, and several trees were snapped or uprooted.							
EF2	E of Blevins	Hempstead, Nevada	AR	33.865°N 93.521°W	13:40–13:42	1.84 mi (2.96 km)	200 yd (180 m)	$500,000
EF2	Numerous trees were snapped, a small trailer was tossed 20 yards (18 m), and four chicken houses were destroyed, killing hundreds of chickens. Two people were injured.							
EF1	S of Fouke	Miller	AR	33.195°N 93.889°W	13:50–13:54	2.63 mi (4.23 km)	150 yd (140 m)	$100,000
EF1	Many trees were snapped or uprooted, of which one fell on a home, puncturing the roof. A large storage building was destroyed, and a second home sustained minor damage.							
EF1	Whelen Springs	Clark	AR	33.830°N 93.130°W	14:08–14:14	3.96 mi (6.37 km)	200 yd (180 m)	$50,000
EF1	The tornado began on the west side of Whelen Springs and traveled to about three miles (4.8 km) west of town. Shingles and siding were blown off a house, and its television antenna was blown over. Numerous trees were blown down, one of which landed on a tractor shed at the residence. A canning shed was destroyed, with bottles and jars being scattered, farm gates were destroyed, and a few power poles and power lines were downed.							
EF1	N of Box Springs	Columbia	AR	33.281°N 93.383°W	14:28–14:29	0.89 mi (1.43 km)	75 yd (69 m)	$75,000
EF1	A few small barns, several homes, and a garage sustained minor damage, and several trees were snapped or uprooted.							
EF1	SE of Norphlet	Union	AR	33.318°N 92.665°W	15:12–15:13	1.28 mi (2.06 km)	100 yd (91 m)	$150,000
EF1	An old gas station cover was blown down, several homes sustained minor roof damage, a carport was collapsed on a vehicle, and several trees were snapped or uprooted. A small metal outbuilding sustained structural damage.							
EF1	Slater	Ballard	KY	36.9944°N 89.0120°W	15:18–15:22	3.72 mi (5.99 km)	200 yd (180 m)	$40,000
EF1	The tornado moved from southwest of Slater to east of the community. Two barns were leveled, and numerous trees were snapped or uprooted.							
EF2	Slater to SSE of Kevil	Ballard	KY	37.0200°N 88.9800°W	15:20–15:27	6.42 mi (10.33 km)	300 yd (270 m)	$700,000
EF2	A farm building was destroyed, the second story of a house was removed, and a garage was leveled. Several additional homes sustained roof damage, two mobile homes were overturned, and four chicken barns were either destroyed or heavily damaged. Numerous farm buildings and grain bins were destroyed, and numerous trees were snapped or uprooted. A mobile home was shifted slightly off its foundation. One person was injured.							
EF0	N of Heath	McCracken	KY	37.0889°N 88.8091°W	15:30–15:31	0.51 mi (0.82 km)	50 yd (46 m)	$30,000
EF0	The roof of a metal farm building was lifted, with two parked vehicles in the structure heavily damaged, and large tree limbs were downed.							
EF1	S of Greenville to Cleaton	Muhlenberg	KY	37.1855°N 87.1800°W	16:55–17:02	7.08 mi (11.39 km)	150 yd (140 m)	$100,000
EF1	One mobile home was overturned and destroyed, another was shifted off its foundation, a camper trailer was overturned, and several houses sustained shingle damage. Several trees were blown down.							
EF2	ESE of Hopkinsville	Christian	KY	36.7835°N 87.3969°W	17:04–17:10	5.26 mi (8.47 km)	200 yd (180 m)	$2,000,000
EF2	An industrial warehouse building along US 41 was heavily damaged, with large sections of roofing removed, small sections of exterior walls blown in, and a rooftop HVAC unit blown away. Elsewhere, steel utility poles were bent almost to the ground, several barns were destroyed, and two homes lost their metal roofs. Dozens of trees were uprooted along the path, which passed just north of Pembroke. Seven people were injured inside the warehouse.							
EF1	N of Sugar Grove	Butler	KY	37.0944°N 86.6947°W	17:26–17:29	3.38 mi (5.44 km)	50 yd (46 m)	Unknown
EF1	A section of a residence's roof was removed, trees were snapped, and a mobile home was moved off its foundation.							
EF1	SSW of Caneyville	Grayson	KY	37.3831°N 86.5611°W	17:38–17:42	3.41 mi (5.49 km)	125 yd (114 m)	Unknown
EF1	A number of trees were snapped or uprooted. Metal roofing was blown off a barn and a residence, one small but well-constructed shed was pushed onto its side, and another small shed was destroyed.							
EF1	Caneyville	Grayson	KY	37.4258°N 86.4894°W	17:41–17:43	1.01 mi (1.63 km)	200 yd (180 m)	Unknown
EF1	A tree was blown onto a restaurant, the metal roof was blown off a cinder block dugout on a baseball field and a mobile home, and three large grain bins were moved off their foundations. A tractor trailer was blown over, and several trees were snapped or uprooted.							
EF1	Waverly	Humphreys	TN	36.0841°N 87.8069°W	18:19–18:22	2.9 mi (4.7 km)	75 yd (69 m)	$155,000
EF1	Several businesses sustained significant roof damage, signs and overhangs were torn off, and dozens of trees were snapped or uprooted, several of which fell on homes and vehicles.							
EF1	Tennessee City to Dickson	Dickson	TN	36.0952°N 87.5390°W	18:33–18:41	7.25 mi (11.67 km)	150 yd (140 m)	$122,000
EF1	Hundreds of trees were snapped or uprooted, several structures sustained significant roof damage, and several outbuildings and barns were heavily damaged.							
EF0	S of Ashland City	Cheatham	TN	36.2514°N 87.0721°W	18:52–18:53	0.81 mi (1.30 km)	50 yd (46 m)	$7,000
EF0	Dozens of trees were snapped or uprooted, and additional damage was observed in an inaccessible area east of the Cumberland River.							
EF1	W of Smyrna	Williamson, Davidson, Rutherford	TN	35.9774°N 86.6570°W	19:20–19:24	4.9 mi (7.9 km)	100 yd (91 m)	$254,000
EF1	The tornado began just inside the Williamson County line near Nolensville and moved east toward Smyrna. Numerous power poles were snapped, hundreds of trees were snapped or uprooted, some small storage buildings were destroyed, numerous homes sustained roof and siding damage, and several fences were blown down. A tractor trailer and several cargo trailers were overturned.							
EF1	SW of Georgetown to SE of Tullos	Grant, LaSalle	LA	31.7200°N 92.4100°W	19:42–19:52	9.29 mi (14.95 km)	275 yd (251 m)	$250,000
EF1	Numerous trees were snapped or uprooted, some of which fell on homes and a vehicle. Shingles were pulled from one house, and a tin roof was ripped from a shop.							
EF1	E of Tompkinsville	Monroe	KY	36.7086°N 85.6086°W	19:55–19:56	0.19 mi (0.31 km)	75 yd (69 m)	Unknown
EF1	A large barn was destroyed, with debris thrown 400 yards (370 m) in several directions, and multiple trees were snapped or uprooted.							
EF2	NE of Summerville to SW of Enterprise	LaSalle, Catahoula	LA	31.8000°N 92.1300°W	19:58–20:09	12.57 mi (20.23 km)	440 yd (400 m)	$310,000
EF2	Numerous trees were snapped or uprooted, a hunting camp was heavily damaged, a mobile home was tossed down a ravine and destroyed, and a covered travel trailer was blown on to its side.							
EF1	SW of Albany	Clinton	KY	36.6492°N 85.1800°W	20:14–20:15	0.25 mi (0.40 km)	150 yd (140 m)	Unknown
EF1	The roof of a large boat storage barn was lifted and thrown, and a second storage shed was destroyed. A house had a window blown out.							
EF0	NNW of Seventy Six	Clinton	KY	36.7974°N 85.1404°W	20:16–20:17	0.22 mi (0.35 km)	60 yd (55 m)	Unknown
EF0	Multiple trees were snapped and uprooted.							
EF2	SSE of Cooter Point, LA to NNW of Grand Gulf, MS	Tensas (LA), Claiborne (MS)	LA, MS	31.9099°N 91.5102°W	20:43–21:14	28.01 mi (45.08 km)	880 yd (800 m)	$4,002,000
EF2	The tornado began in Tensas Parish, Louisiana before dissipating in Claiborne County, Mississippi. Numerous homes, farms, and outbuildings sustained significant damage, a water treatment plant and antebellum home were majorly damaged, a grain silo received a huge dent, and an 18-wheeler was flipped over. Hundreds of trees were snapped and uprooted, and numerous power poles were snapped. One person was injured.							
EF0	WNW of Hebron	Licking	OH	39.981°N 82.571°W	20:46–20:47	0.9 mi (1.4 km)	50 yd (46 m)	$60,000
EF0	A large garage had a portion of its roof peeled off, a supporting post was snapped, one side of the building was blown inward, and metal doors on the opposite side were blown outward. A smaller garage sustained major damage to a metal door. A large section of metal and wood roofing was removed from a barn, a door was removed from a smaller storage shed, and a house sustained minor damage. A few trees were uprooted.							
EF1	NW of Williamsburg	Whitley	KY	36.8251°N 84.2241°W	21:03–21:06	1.74 mi (2.80 km)	880 yd (800 m)	$200,000
EF1	Many trees were downed or uprooted, and several barns and outbuildings sustained significant damage.							
EF1	NE of Utica	Hinds	MS	32.1284°N 90.6278°W	21:42–21:45	4.02 mi (6.47 km)	440 yd (400 m)	$120,000
EF1	A number of trees were snapped or uprooted, and two outbuildings were destroyed.							
EF1	E of Beaver	Floyd	KY	37.390°N 82.640°W	22:21–22:26	0.4 mi (0.64 km)	100 yd (91 m)	$10,000
EF1	A trailer home was destroyed, and approximately 100 trees were downed.							
EF0	NE of Athens	McMinn	TN	35.460°N 84.590°W	22:36–22:40	0.1 mi (0.16 km)	25 yd (23 m)	$10,000
EF0	Eight trees were downed.							
EF1	NNE of Harrisville to ENE of Braxton	Simpson	MS	32.0102°N 90.0455°W	22:36–22:42	7.38 mi (11.88 km)	1,320 yd (1,210 m)	$550,000
EF1	Many trees were snapped or uprooted, some of which fell on homes and vehicles. Many power lines were downed as well.							
EF1	W of Ruth to ESE of Topeka	Lincoln, Lawrence	MS	31.3800°N 90.3554°W	22:48–23:07	17.28 mi (27.81 km)	600 yd (550 m)	$1,500,000
EF1	A gas station awning was destroyed, the back wall was blown out of a volunteer fire department building, a church had its steeple blown off and sustained extensive shingle damage, and numerous homes sustained various degrees of roof damage. Several trees were snapped or uprooted, some of which fell on vehicles and houses.							
EF1	E of Franklinton	Washington	LA	30.8500°N 90.1400°W	23:40	0.2 mi (0.32 km)	75 yd (69 m)	$30,000
EF1	A home lost a large portion of its roof, two mobile homes also sustained roof damage, and several large trees were uprooted.							
EF1	S of Killian	Livingston	LA	30.3246°N 90.5735°W	23:42	0.5 mi (0.80 km)	50 yd (46 m)	$10,000
EF1	Several trees were snapped or uprooted, and a metal roof was peeled off a home.							
EF0	Gramercy	St. James	LA	30.0614°N 90.6990°W	23:50–23:52	0.94 mi (1.51 km)	50 yd (46 m)	$50,000
EF0	A carport was lifted off a home, causing significant damage, and other buildings sustained minor to moderate roof damage. Significant tree damage was observed.							
EF1	SW of Bogalusa	Washington	LA	30.6677°N 89.9690°W	00:01	0.2 mi (0.32 km)	75 yd (69 m)	$50,000
EF1	A trailer was lifted and thrown into a camper. Sheet metal, tin roofing, and an awning were tossed and wrapped around a tree. Numerous trees were snapped or uprooted.							
EF1	SSE of Poplarville	Pearl River	MS	30.6695°N 89.4527°W	00:43	0.25 mi (0.40 km)	50 yd (46 m)	$30,000
EF1	Multiple trees were snapped or uprooted, and a portion of a metal roof was peeled off a home, breaking a few roof beams.							
EF1	NW of Neely to SSW of State Line	Greene	MS	31.2665°N 88.8278°W	00:43–01:03	19.42 mi (31.25 km)	100 yd (91 m)	$500,000
EF1	Thousands of trees were snapped or uprooted, some of which fell on the roofs of several homes and a church, and a metal barn was destroyed.							
EF1	E of Ocean Springs	Jackson	MS	30.4022°N 88.7198°W	01:45	0.1 mi (0.16 km)	75 yd (69 m)	$35,000
EF1	Roofing was removed from a few commercial buildings, windows were blown out of two houses, large sections of two fences were blown down, large tree limbs were snapped, and several trees were blown down.							
EF1	NE of Carters Lake	Gilmer	GA	34.6380°N 84.5923°W	01:33–01:36	2.64 mi (4.25 km)	880 yd (800 m)	$1,000,000
EF1	Hundreds of trees were snapped or uprooted, inflicting various degrees of damage to approximately 100 homes.							
EF0	WNW of Ellijay	Gilmer	GA	34.7206°N 84.6039°W	01:34–01:36	1.83 mi (2.95 km)	880 yd (800 m)	$500,000
EF0	Several hundred trees were snapped or uprooted, six chicken houses were heavily damaged or destroyed, a horse stable was destroyed, and three outbuildings were heavily damaged.							

=== April 5 event ===
List of confirmed tornadoes – Tuesday, April 5, 2011
EF#	Location	County / Parish	State	Start Coord.	Time (UTC)	Path length	Max width	Damage
EF1	Ararat	Surry	NC	36.3951°N 80.5721°W	05:25–05:28	2.68 mi (4.31 km)	250 yd (230 m)	$1,000,000
EF1	About 35 to 40 homes sustained roof or shingle damage, carports collapsed on vehicles, and the windows were blown out at a community building. Numerous trees were felled, some of which landed on houses and barns.							
EF1	WNW of Walden	Bibb	GA	32.7119°N 83.7127°W	05:30–05:32	1.11 mi (1.79 km)	50 yd (46 m)	$300,000
EF1	Approximately 100 trees were blown down, snapped, or uprooted, inflicting minor to moderate damage to nine homes. The garage was blown out of one of the houses, shifting the home off its foundation and causing significant damage.							
EF2	NW of Eastman	Dodge	GA	32.2846°N 83.3234°W	06:39–06:42	3.13 mi (5.04 km)	50 yd (46 m)	$150,000
EF2	1 death – A double-wide mobile home was completely destroyed, killing one of the occupants. Several trees were blown down or uprooted, and the roof and front porch of a second mobile home were destroyed. Two people were injured.							
EF0	WNW of Mattawoman	Charles	MD	38.6521°N 76.8901°W	08:48–08:49	0.09 mi (0.14 km)	50 yd (46 m)	$5,000
EF0	A large tree was downed onto a house roof, and several others were snapped. A fence was damaged, and several outdoor objects were blown around.							
EF0	E of Collington	Prince George's, Anne Arundel	MD	38.9680°N 76.7160°W	08:55–08:57	1.34 mi (2.16 km)	50 yd (46 m)	$4,000
EF0	Numerous trees were topped or blown down.							

=== April 7 event ===
List of confirmed tornadoes – Thursday, April 7, 2011
EF#	Location	County / Parish	State	Start Coord.	Time (UTC)	Path length	Max width	Damage
EF0	Rockville	Solano	CA	38.2445°N 122.1215°W	22:52–22:54	0.11 mi (180 m)	10 yd (9.1 m)	$26,000
EF0	Brief tornado damaged a strip mall, a hair salon, and a few signs in a commercial area. Fences were damaged, and a few trees were downed as well.							

=== April 8 event ===
List of confirmed tornadoes – Friday, April 8, 2011
EF#	Location	County / Parish	State	Start Coord.	Time (UTC)	Path length	Max width	Damage
EF2	Pulaski	Pulaski	VA	37.0490°N 80.8030°W	23:35–23:38	1.9 mi (3.1 km)	400 yd (370 m)	$3,900,000
EF2	Over 200 houses were damaged in Pulaski, of which at least 30 were destroyed. Some homes had entire roofs removed and upper floors destroyed. A couple were knocked off their foundations. Many trees were snapped. Nine people were injured.							
EF1	S of Pulaski to SE of Draper	Pulaski	VA	37.0280°N 80.7740°W	23:42–23:47	3.14 mi (5.05 km)	480 yd (440 m)	$1,400,000
EF1	Many houses and a gas station were damaged at Exit 92 on Interstate 81 and a mobile home was destroyed. Many trees were downed along the path.							

=== April 9 event ===
List of confirmed tornadoes – Saturday, April 9, 2011
EF#	Location	County / Parish	State	Start Coord.	Time (UTC)	Path length	Max width	Damage
EF0	W of Valeria	Menifee, Wolfe	KY	37.83°N 83.62°W	18:00–18:04	0.25 mi (0.40 km)	250 yd (230 m)	$10,000
EF0	Hundreds of trees were damaged in the Daniel Boone National Forest. The path may have been longer but was unable to be surveyed.							
EF0	Valeria	Wolfe	KY	37.8305°N 83.5164°W	18:05–18:09	0.25 mi (0.40 km)	100 yd (91 m)	$30,000
EF0	A well-constructed barn lifted and moved, a well-anchored carport was destroyed, and many large trees were twisted or uprooted. Two houses and a vehicle were also damaged.							
EF0	Norton	City of Norton	VA	36.9343°N 82.6329°W	19:45–19:48	0.37 mi (0.60 km)	40 yd (37 m)	$50,000
EF0	Two old buildings sustained roof damage and partial wall collapse, and several trees were downed.							
EF0	Milligan College	Carter	TN	36.2971°N 82.3174°W	20:35–20:40	0.89 mi (1.43 km)	50 yd (46 m)	$20,000
EF0	Several trees were downed in the community of Milligan College, just west of Milligan College.							
EF0	NNE of Shelby	Cleveland	NC	35.368°N 81.512°W	20:50–20:51	0.53 mi (0.85 km)	75 yd (69 m)	$50,000
EF0	Two mobile homes were flipped over, injuring three of the occupants in one. Several houses sustained minor structural damage, and other mobile homes received mainly minor underskirting and roof damage. The roof was blown off a vehicle shed, and trees were downed.							
EF1	E of Jonesborough	Washington	TN	36.3000°N 82.4341°W	22:00–22:05	3 mi (4.8 km)	150 yd (140 m)	$75,000
EF1	Three barns were heavily damaged, and numerous trees and power lines were downed.							
EF1	Johnson City	Washington	TN	36.3037°N 82.3923°W	22:08–22:11	0.61 mi (0.98 km)	100 yd (91 m)	$10,000
EF1	Several large trees were knocked down.							
EF0	NNE of Flag Pond	Unicoi	TN	36.0424°N 82.5568°W	22:15–22:20	1.04 mi (1.67 km)	50 yd (46 m)	$15,000
EF0	Several trees were downed.							
EF3	Mapleton	Monona	IA	42.1535°N 95.8283°W	00:20–00:26	3.38 mi (5.44 km)	1,200 yd (1,100 m)	Unknown
EF3	See article on this tornado – 14 people were injured.							
EF1	NW of Ricketts	Crawford	IA	42.1956°N 95.6493°W	00:37–00:38	0.69 mi (1.11 km)	75 yd (69 m)	$25,000
EF1	This tornado, which was produced by the same storm as the Mapleton EF3 tornado, knocked down power lines.							
EF2	W of Arthur	Ida	IA	42.3217°N 95.3969°W	01:20–01:28	4.13 mi (6.65 km)	440 yd (400 m)	$50,000
EF2	This tornado occurred between Arthur and Ida Grove, where two grain bins and two outbuildings on a farmstead were either heavily damaged or destroyed, and a house and garage sustained shingle damage. Several trees were downed, and power poles and lines were damaged.							
EF3	NW of Odebolt to E of Schaller	Sac	IA	42.3549°N 95.2860°W	01:23–01:55	10.14 mi (16.32 km)	1,760 yd (1,610 m)	$2,000,000
EF3	A large wedge tornado damaged or destroyed several houses and downed power lines. It initially moved northeast toward Early before making a sharp turn north-northwest to just east of Schaller. This tornado occurred simultaneously to and just west of the following tornado.							
EF2	N of Odebolt to N of Early	Sac	IA	42.3746°N 95.2424°W	01:29–01:54	8.34 mi (13.42 km)	660 yd (600 m)	$1,000,000
EF2	See article on this tornado.							
EF0	SSW of Early	Sac	IA	42.3948°N 95.2027°W	01:38–01:40	0.75 mi (1.21 km)	100 yd (91 m)	$1,000
EF0	This tornado formed as a satellite to the previous tornado. It executed a brief loop and then moved due north before dissipating. It remained primarily over open country.							
EF1	S of Galva	Ida	IA	42.4364°N 95.4499°W	01:42–01:47	4.21 mi (6.78 km)	200 yd (180 m)	$100,000
EF1	A farmstead was severely damaged, with numerous outbuildings destroyed and a home losing its roof. Outbuildings at another farmstead were damaged, as was an outbuilding at an ethanol plant. At least five power poles were snapped, and trees were downed as well.							
EF3	NNE of Early to NW of Pocahontas	Sac, Buena Vista, Pocahontas	IA	42.5191°N 95.1291°W	02:08–03:07	29.37 mi (47.27 km)	2,640 yd (2,410 m)	$13,000,000
EF3	See article on this tornado – A very large and long lived wedge tornado traversed through three counties, causing severe damage to several farmsteads and the communities of Varina and Ware.							
EF0	S of Sulphur Springs	Buena Vista	IA	42.58°N 95.09°W	02:14–02:15	0.53 mi (0.85 km)	50 yd (46 m)	$0
EF0	This brief tornado occurred just a few miles north of the long-track EF3 tornado that began at 02:08 UTC. No damage was reported.							
EF1	SSE of Cherokee	Cherokee	IA	42.6067°N 95.5435°W	02:20–02:30	5.17 mi (8.32 km)	300 yd (270 m)	$100,000
EF1	Several outbuildings were damaged or destroyed on two farmsteads, a camper was flipped into a garage, causing damage to both, a large anchored empty tank was flipped, and several buildings in a livestock confinement area were heavily damaged. A house sustained roof damage and broken windows, a grain bin was blown into a semi truck, and a semi trailer was flipped onto another grain bin. Several trees were snapped or uprooted, corn stubble was scoured, and power poles and lines were damaged.							
EF2	SE of Newell	Sac, Buena Vista	IA	42.5556°N 94.9744°W	02:24–02:27	1.6 mi (2.6 km)	220 yd (200 m)	$510,000
EF2	First satellite tornado of the EF3 tornado that touched down at 02:08 UTC.							
EF1	ESE of Newell	Buena Vista	IA	42.5751°N 94.9438°W	02:25–02:27	1.08 mi (1.74 km)	150 yd (140 m)	$10,000
EF1	Several outbuildings and farm structures were damaged. This tornado tracked over the same track of the EF3 tornado that began at 02:08 UTC.							
EF0	SW of Alta	Buena Vista	IA	42.64°N 95.34°W	02:50–02:51	0.17 mi (0.27 km)	50 yd (46 m)	$0
EF0	A storm chaser reported two simultaneous brief tornadoes with no damage.							
EF0	SW of Alta	Buena Vista	IA	42.65°N 95.35°W	02:50–02:51	0.17 mi (0.27 km)	50 yd (46 m)	$0
EF0	A storm chaser reported two simultaneous brief tornadoes with no damage.							
EF4	W of Pocahontas	Pocahontas	IA	42.7293°N 94.8557°W	02:54–03:01	3.2 mi (5.1 km)	587 yd (537 m)	$2,500,000
EF4	Second satellite tornado of the EF3 tornado that touched down at 02:08 UTC. One farmstead was completely devastated by this violent tornado.							
EF1	WSW of Pocahontas	Pocahontas	IA	42.6895°N 94.8141°W	02:55–02:58	1.58 mi (2.54 km)	100 yd (91 m)	$10,000
EF1	Third satellite tornado of the EF3 tornado that touched down at 02:08 UTC. This was the cyclonic counterpart of the following, fourth satellite tornado.							
EF1	WSW of Pocahontas	Pocahontas	IA	42.6912°N 94.8141°W	02:55–02:58	1.64 mi (2.64 km)	100 yd (91 m)	$10,000
EF1	Fourth satellite tornado of the EF3 tornado that touched down at 02:08 UTC. This was the anticyclonic counterpart of the previous, third satellite tornado.							
EF2	W of Pocahontas	Pocahontas	IA	42.7105°N 94.8144°W	02:56–02:58	0.9 mi (1.4 km)	146 yd (134 m)	$100,000
EF2	Fifth satellite tornado of the EF3 tornado that touched down at 02:08 UTC. This tornado was quickly absorbed by the second, violent EF4 satellite tornado.							
EF1	WNW of Pocahontas	Pocahontas	IA	42.7340°N 94.7442°W	03:08–03:13	2.42 mi (3.89 km)	250 yd (230 m)	$10,000
EF1	One house was damaged as the tornado remained over mostly open fields. This tornado occurred east of the track of the 02:08 UTC EF3 tornado that had just dissipated to the northwest.							
EF1	WNW of St. Joseph	Kossuth	IA	42.9231°N 94.2771°W	04:19–04:21	0.79 mi (1.27 km)	100 yd (91 m)	$150,000
EF1	A hog barn was damaged, numerous windows were blown out, and a shed was partially collapsed.							

=== April 10 event ===
List of confirmed tornadoes – Sunday, April 10, 2011
EF#	Location	County / Parish	State	Start Coord.	Time (UTC)	Path length	Max width	Damage
EF1	SW of Augusta	Eau Claire	WI	44.63°N 91.19°W	21:57–22:03	1.58 mi (2.54 km)	200 yd (180 m)	$200,000
EF1	Two farmsteads were impacted, with many trees downed. At one, a garage was destroyed, and a barn was heavily damaged as well. This was the earliest tornado to touch down in Eau Claire County on record; the previous earliest was May 10.							
EF1	NW of Augusta	Eau Claire	WI	44.69°N 91.14°W	22:04–22:06	0.74 mi (1.19 km)	150 yd (140 m)	$250,000
EF1	Two outbuildings destroyed, three more were heavily damaged, and numerous trees and power poles were snapped.							
EF3	N of Hamburg to NE of Merrill	Marathon, Lincoln	WI	45.1113°N 89.8858°W	23:08–23:41	21.15 mi (34.04 km)	1,050 yd (960 m)	$11,158,000
EF3	See section on this tornado – 2 people were injured.							
EF2	W of Arkdale to ENE of Cottonville	Adams	WI	44.0216°N 89.9549°W	23:12–23:30	17.08 mi (27.49 km)	800 yd (730 m)	$3,300,000
EF2	Numerous houses sustained roof and structural damage, and mobile homes were either heavily damaged or destroyed, along with barns and sheds. A camping trailer was also overturned and sheet metal was wrapped around trees. A lake association building was completely destroyed, a cement silo was knocked over, vehicles were flipped, and numerous center-pivot irrigation systems were twisted or destroyed. Numerous trees were downed along the path.							
EF1	S of Necedah	Juneau	WI	43.9954°N 90.0936°W	23:14–23:21	4.37 mi (7.03 km)	150 yd (140 m)	$30,000
EF1	A mobile home was rolled over, and pine trees were snapped.							
EF1	SW of Hancock	Adams, Waushara	WI	44.0754°N 89.6184°W	23:30–23:42	11.73 mi (18.88 km)	140 yd (130 m)	$601,000
EF1	Several houses sustained roof damage, the roof was torn off a mobile home, and several center-pivot irrigation systems were destroyed. Trees and power poles were downed as well.							
EF1	SE of Parrish	Langlade	WI	45.3496°N 89.3822°W	23:50–23:58	5.3 mi (8.5 km)	400 yd (370 m)	$1,000,000
EF1	This tornado produced extensive tree damage along the path, affecting over 1,600 acres (6.5 km^{2}) and knocking down or damaging over one million trees. One cabin was destroyed by falling trees.							
EF1	Saxeville to Fremont to SE of Hortonville	Waushara, Waupaca, Outagamie	WI	44.1687°N 89.1356°W	00:06–00:43	27.68 mi (44.55 km)	200 yd (180 m)	Unknown
EF1	Multiple barns and other farm buildings were heavily damaged or destroyed, and highway signs were damaged. The roof was torn off a house in Readfield, and the steeple was torn off a church. Many trees were snapped or uprooted along the path.							
EF2	SE of Argonne to SE of Popple River	Forest, Florence	WI	45.6386°N 88.8233°W	00:30–00:51	11.97 mi (19.26 km)	600 yd (550 m)	$215,000
EF2	Hundreds of trees were snapped or uprooted, some of which fell on cabins. A roof was torn off of a home, several barns and garages were destroyed, and power lines were downed as well.							
EF1	Poy Sippi to W of Winchester	Waushara, Winnebago	WI	44.1327°N 89.0045°W	00:53–01:07	14.93 mi (24.03 km)	150 yd (140 m)	$1,470,000
EF1	Near Poy Sippi, a house was damaged, and a barn was destroyed. Along the north shore of Lake Poygan, another barn was flattened. Near Boom Bay in Winnebago County, two homes lost portions of their roofs, while several other houses sustained minor damage. Two small mobile homes were rolled as well. Many trees were snapped or uprooted along the path.							
EF1	W of Armstrong Creek	Forest	WI	45.6500°N 88.5253°W	01:03–01:08	3.29 mi (5.29 km)	250 yd (230 m)	$50,000
EF1	A garage was destroyed, and two houses were damaged, one of which sustained significant roof damage. Many trees were snapped or uprooted as well.							
EF0	SE of Berlin	Green Lake	WI	43.9198°N 88.9130°W	01:27–01:29	1.83 mi (2.95 km)	50 yd (46 m)	$300
EF0	Lawn furniture was sucked from under a porch and thrown against a fence, an outdoor spa was damaged, and a wooden structure received light damage. Trees and tree branches were snapped as well.							
EF2	Kaukauna	Outagamie	WI	44.2578°N 88.2881°W	01:43–01:46	1.52 mi (2.45 km)	175 yd (160 m)	$6,700,000
EF2	Over 180 houses were impacted in Kaukauna, several of them losing large sections of their roofs. In total, seven homes were destroyed, 24 homes and four businesses sustained major damage, and 160 other homes sustained minor damage. A church sustained roof damage and had air conditioning units torn off, and large trees were snapped or uprooted.							
EF1	S of Greenleaf	Brown	WI	44.2578°N 88.2881°W	01:53–01:55	1.2 mi (1.9 km)	75 yd (69 m)	$15,000
EF1	The tops of two silos were damaged, and a barn roof was ripped off.							
EF1	S of Stockbridge	Calumet	WI	44.0378°N 88.3214°W	01:59–02:01	1.67 mi (2.69 km)	100 yd (91 m)	$100,000
EF1	A waterspout moved onshore from Lake Winnebago and damaged two homes. A three-season room on one of the houses was ripped off the structure. It also tore off a section of the roof of a large metal outbuilding and snapped the tops of trees.							
EF0	NNE of Rogersville	Webster	MO	37.15°N 93.06°W	03:55–04:03	6.67 mi (10.73 km)	100 yd (91 m)	$10,000
EF0	Outbuildings were damaged, and trees were downed.							

=== April 11 event ===
List of confirmed tornadoes – Monday, April 11, 2011
EF#	Location	County / Parish	State	Start Coord.	Time (UTC)	Path length	Max width	Damage
EF1	NNW of Rio Vista	Johnson	TX	32.2702°N 97.4159°W	06:09–06:13	1.51 mi (2.43 km)	100 yd (91 m)	$150,000
EF1	Five houses were damaged, one of them heavily, and a wall was torn from a pharmacy. A garage was shifted off its foundation, and several trees were downed.							
EF1	Alvarado	Johnson	TX	32.4143°N 97.2330°W	06:22–06:23	0.13 mi (0.21 km)	50 yd (46 m)	$100,000
EF1	Five commercial buildings were damaged, and a mobile home was flipped. Two people were injured.							
EF1	Northern Forney	Kaufman	TX	32.7721°N 96.4716°W	07:13–07:17	0.53 mi (0.85 km)	60 yd (55 m)	$60,000
EF1	Five houses sustained roof damage, and a truck stop sign was blown over.							
EF1	Cash to NW of Lone Oak	Hunt	TX	32.9888°N 96.1126°W	07:34–07:48	6.53 mi (10.51 km)	200 yd (180 m)	$250,000
EF1	Eight homes, a pipe manufacturing plant, and two metal buildings were damaged in Cash, while four U-Haul trailers were blown across the highway. Several more homes sustain mainly minor roof damage to the northeast of Cash, although one home sustained significant damage to the roof and second story. Northwest of Lone Oak, five mobile homes were damaged or destroyed, and another site-built home sustained significant damage. Trees were downed along the path.							
EF1	Vestavia Hills	Jefferson	AL	33.4496°N 86.7883°W	00:30–00:31	0.38 mi (0.61 km)	100 yd (91 m)	$65,000
EF1	This brief tornado was embedded in a larger microburst. Several homes and other buildings were damaged, mostly by falling trees, and the windows were blown out of a vehicle. Numerous trees were snapped or uprooted as well.							

=== April 14 to April 16 events ===
A total of 178 tornadoes touched down in this large tornado outbreak.

Confirmed tornadoes by Enhanced Fujita rating
EFU	EF0	EF1	EF2	EF3	EF4	EF5	Total
0	52	81	32	13	0	0	178

=== April 14 event (Western United States) ===
List of confirmed tornadoes – Thursday, April 14, 2011
EF#	Location	County / Parish	State	Start Coord.	Time (UTC)	Path length	Max width	Damage
EF0	SSW of Lexington	Morrow	OR	45.4208°N 119.7096°W	23:15–23:16	0.16 mi (260 m)	10 yd (9.1 m)	$500
EF0	A brief tornado damaged a pump house on a farm, throwing insulation and lumber up to 100 yards (91 m) away. Trees, grass, and weeds were blown down.							

=== April 19 event ===
List of confirmed tornadoes – Tuesday, April 19, 2011
EF#	Location	County / Parish	State	Start Coord.	Time (UTC)	Path length	Max width	Damage
EF1	SW of Bowling Green	Pike	MO	39.2965°N 91.2967°W	21:00–21:08	4.12 mi (6.63 km)	150 yd (140 m)	Unknown
EF1	Two farmhouses were heavily damaged, and a barn, farm equipment, and several outbuildings were destroyed. Another barn was damaged, and many trees were downed along the path.							
EF0	Clarksville	Pike	MO	39.3630°N 90.9018°W	21:36–21:37	0.4 mi (0.64 km)	50 yd (46 m)	Unknown
EF0	Several houses sustained roof damage, a church had broken windows, and several carports and fences were damaged. Trees were downed as well. The tornado dissipated while crossing the Mississippi River and was accompanied by softball-sized hail.							
EF0	N of Fewell	Pushmataha	OK	34.5345°N 95.0300°W	22:58	0.1 mi (0.16 km)	50 yd (46 m)	$0
EF0	Brief tornado with no damage.							
EF3	N of Girard	Macoupin	IL	39.4427°N 89.8250°W	22:58–23:05	5.1 mi (8.2 km)	200 yd (180 m)	Unknown
EF3	See section on this tornado – 2 people were injured while several cows were killed.							
EF1	Honobia	Pushmataha, Le Flore	OK	34.5320°N 94.9631°W	23:07–23:15	3.5 mi (5.6 km)	100 yd (91 m)	$0
EF1	This tornado was caught on camera by a storm chaser. Several large trees were snapped in the Honobia area.							
EF2	N of Farmersville	Montgomery	IL	39.4614°N 89.6483°W	23:08–23:12	3.16 mi (5.09 km)	150 yd (140 m)	Unknown
EF2	Three power poles were snapped, a grain bin was rolled across Interstate 55 and deposited in a tree, and two machine sheds were destroyed. Numerous trees snapped or uprooted as well.							
EF2	S of Honey Bend	Montgomery	IL	39.2476°N 89.6611°W	23:15–23:19	3.51 mi (5.65 km)	200 yd (180 m)	Unknown
EF2	Several outbuildings, sheds, and silos were destroyed, and other outbuildings and barns sustained minor to moderate damage. Numerous homes were damaged, with a large portion of the roof on one home being removed. A two-story log home sustained extensive damage as well. Trees were downed, about a dozen power poles were snapped, and power lines were knocked down onto Interstate 55, blocking traffic for roughly four hours.							
EF1	SSW of Kincaid	Christian	IL	39.5464°N 89.4616°W	23:17–23:20	1.99 mi (3.20 km)	100 yd (91 m)	$90,000
EF1	Several grain bins and a large farm storage building were destroyed.							
EF0	SSW of Morrisonville	Christian	IL	39.3765°N 89.5106°W	23:30–23:32	3.48 mi (5.60 km)	100 yd (91 m)	$95,000
EF0	The roof was torn off a hog pen, the north doors of a large metal farm building were collapsed, and a small barn was destroyed. Several power poles were knocked down as well.							
EF1	NE of Taylorville	Christian	IL	39.5717°N 89.2741°W	23:32–23:33	0.91 mi (1.46 km)	100 yd (91 m)	$60,000
EF1	Eight empty railroad cars were knocked over.							
EF0	NW of Zafra	Le Flore	OK	34.5823°N 94.5823°W	23:45	0.1 mi (0.16 km)	75 yd (69 m)	$0
EF0	Brief tornado with no damage.							
EF0	N of Zafra	Le Flore	OK	34.5734°N 94.5407°W	23:48–23:52	3 mi (4.8 km)	125 yd (114 m)	$0
EF0	The tornado remained over open country and caused no damage.							
EF1	S of Clubb to S of Cascade	Wayne	MO	37.2041°N 90.3500°W	00:43–00:50	5.16 mi (8.30 km)	500 yd (460 m)	$25,000
EF1	Many trees were snapped or uprooted, mostly in heavily forested conservation land.							
EF0	Patton	Bollinger	MO	37.4947°N 90.0228°W	00:55–00:56	0.5 mi (0.80 km)	100 yd (91 m)	$15,000
EF0	A barn was destroyed, and many trees were downed.							
EF1	NE of Chrisman	Edgar	IL	39.8245°N 87.6562°W	00:59–01:01	1.14 mi (1.83 km)	100 yd (91 m)	$140,000
EF1	The roof was torn off a house, two barns were destroyed, and a garage was damaged.							
EF0	NE of Henning	Vermilion	IL	40.3064°N 87.7006°W	01:02–01:05	2.71 mi (4.36 km)	25 yd (23 m)	$225,000
EF0	Several houses sustained roof, siding, and awning damage, and trees and power poles were knocked down.							
EF1	WNW of Newport to Wallace to Crawfordsville	Vermillion, Parke, Fountain, Montgomery	IN	39.8979°N 87.4796°W	01:10–01:40	31.15 mi (50.13 km)	100 yd (91 m)	$85,000
EF1	A long-track tornado downed trees and power lines and damaged houses and sheds. One shed in Vermillion County was destroyed, and another structure in Park County was damaged. The tornado was downgraded from EF2 to EF1 in final analysis.							
EF1	E of Rossville	Vermilion	IL	40.3661°N 87.5862°W	01:11–01:14	2.56 mi (4.12 km)	100 yd (91 m)	$360,000
EF1	Two houses, six grain bins, two sheds, a garage, a combine, and several pieces of farming equipment were damaged.							
EF0	WSW of Elkville to E of Dowell	Jackson	IL	37.9000°N 89.2630°W	01:35–01:40	3.94 mi (6.34 km)	100 yd (91 m)	$70,000
EF0	Several carports, a camper, and a garage were destroyed. Numerous homes and barns sustained roof damage, an amateur radio tower was bent over, and numerous trees were uprooted.							
EF1	SW of Royalton	Franklin	IL	37.8577°N 89.1356°W	01:40–01:41	0.3 mi (0.48 km)	50 yd (46 m)	$80,000
EF1	Several houses sustained roof and structural damage, with one having partial roof loss. Trees were downed, and large tree limbs were driven into a house and barn.							
EF1	S of Lafayette	Tippecanoe	IN	40.3453°N 86.8953°W	01:40–01:42	0.71 mi (1.14 km)	100 yd (91 m)	$80,000
EF1	Many large trees snapped or uprooted, with some landing on homes and one destroying a garage. Downgraded from EF2 to EF1 in final analysis.							
EF1	Benton	Franklin	IL	38.0029°N 88.9200°W	01:49	0.15 mi (0.24 km)	50 yd (46 m)	$10,000
EF1	Large oak trees were snapped and thrown several yards, other trees were uprooted, and a fence was damaged.							
EF0	ESE of Buck Creek	Tippecanoe	IN	40.4766°N 86.7612°W	01:50–01:52	2.64 mi (4.25 km)	50 yd (46 m)	$15,000
EF0	A barn lost parts of its roof and siding.							
EF1	NW of Thorntown	Boone	IN	40.1362°N 86.6336°W	01:55–01:56	0.64 mi (1.03 km)	50 yd (46 m)	$10,000
EF1	Numerous trees were snapped, and a barn was destroyed.							
EF1	E of Centralia	Marion	IL	38.5233°N 89.0708°W	02:02–02:03	0.36 mi (0.58 km)	75 yd (69 m)	Unknown
EF1	The roof of an attached garage on a home was uplifted and thrown, with a 2x4 driven into another part of the roof. Another home sustained minor roof damage, a trampoline was thrown, a small outbuilding was damaged, and a pole barn was collapsed. Several trees were uprooted as well.							
EF1	N of Mount Vernon	Jefferson	IL	38.3476°N 88.9352°W	02:03–02:07	4.27 mi (6.87 km)	100 yd (91 m)	$70,000
EF1	Several houses sustained minor shingle damage, awnings and overhangs were destroyed, and many trees were snapped or uprooted.							
EF1	SE of Bluford	Jefferson	IL	38.3147°N 88.7304°W	02:06–02:08	1.43 mi (2.30 km)	100 yd (91 m)	$90,000
EF1	A house sustained heavy roof damage, several barns and sheds were either heavily damaged or destroyed, and many trees were snapped or uprooted.							
EF1	SE of McLeansboro	Hamilton	IL	38.0386°N 88.4520°W	02:19–02:24	3.36 mi (5.41 km)	150 yd (140 m)	$150,000
EF1	A small grain bin was destroyed, and hundreds of trees were uprooted.							
EF0	NNE of Adamsboro	Cass	IN	40.81°N 86.26°W	02:19	220 yd (200 m)	25 yd (23 m)	Unknown
EF0	A brief tornado destroyed a pole barn.							
EF0	E of Twelve Mile	Cass	IN	40.87°N 86.20°W	02:20	50 yd (46 m)	25 yd (23 m)	Unknown
EF0	This brief tornado shifted an outbuilding off its foundation, carried its roof into a field, and bent a TV antenna.							
EF0	W of Randles	Cape Girardeau	MO	37.1300°N 89.8708°W	02:27	0.1 mi (0.16 km)	40 yd (37 m)	$20,000
EF0	A brief tornado downed a few trees and power lines and blew out a window of a house.							
EF2	SSE of Carmi	White	IL	37.9925°N 88.1340°W	02:28–02:32	1.8 mi (2.9 km)	125 yd (114 m)	$2,000,000
EF2	Two farms were severely damaged, with barns and over a dozen grain bins destroyed, irrigation pivots overturned, and an equipment shed unroofed. Trees and power poles were knocked down, a 7-ton (6,350 kg) truck was flipped, and a large house sustained considerable roof damage, wall collapse, and blown out windows.							
EF1	ENE of Carmi	White	IL	38.0956°N 88.1012°W	02:30–02:32	1.44 mi (2.32 km)	100 yd (91 m)	$300,000
EF1	A few barns and grain bins were destroyed, the roof was torn off a farm house, with windows also broken, and a mobile home was blown off its foundation. Power poles were snapped, and numerous trees were downed as well.							
EF2	SE of Fairfield to SSW of Mount Erie	Wayne	IL	38.3268°N 88.3021°W	02:30–02:37	10.57 mi (17.01 km)	150 yd (140 m)	$400,000
EF2	A house had part of its roof removed and separation of walls, a machine shed and several grain bins were destroyed, and a large tank was thrown about 150 yards (140 m). Dozens of trees were snapped or uprooted, about a dozen power poles were snapped, and an outbuilding was blown across a highway. Two people were injured.							
EF1	WSW of Fairmount	Grant	IN	40.3945°N 85.7099°W	02:41–02:44	2.53 mi (4.07 km)	150 yd (140 m)	$100,000
EF1	Several houses were damaged, with one having part of the roof and siding ripped off and windows broken. Trees were downed as well.							
EF2	W of Keensburg to N of Mt. Carmel	Wabash	IL	38.3500°N 87.9475°W	02:48–02:55	11.25 mi (18.11 km)	250 yd (230 m)	$2,500,000
EF2	Three steel transmission towers were bent down, and a single-wide mobile home was demolished, with the frame being blown about 50 yards (46 m). A grain bin was blown roughly one mile (1.6 km) into a tree line, three more grain bins and several barns were destroyed, and machine sheds were unroofed or had collapsed walls. Numerous houses sustained minor to moderate roof damage, smaller sheds were destroyed, power poles were snapped, and hundreds of trees were snapped or uprooted.							
EF1	W of Upland	Grant	IN	40.4519°N 85.5370°W	02:48–02:51	2.9 mi (4.7 km)	50 yd (46 m)	Unknown
EF1	Homes sustained minor damage, and numerous trees were snapped.							
EF1	NW of Allendale	Wabash	IL	38.5300°N 87.7866°W	02:53–02:56	2.75 mi (4.43 km)	125 yd (114 m)	$50,000
EF1	Numerous trees were snapped or uprooted, including dense groves of pine and cedar, and power poles were knocked down. A mobile home was rolled, siding was blown off a house, and a back porch was blown off.							
EF1	SSW of Allendale, IL to NW of Decker, IN	Knox	IN	38.5301°N 87.5332°W	02:54–03:02	10.91 mi (17.56 km)	75 yd (69 m)	$206,000
EF1	A large metal building was destroyed, another structure had windows blown in, and several high-tension towers and lines were downed.							
EF1	Wheatonville to SE of Buckskin	Warrick, Gibson	IN	38.1800°N 87.4700°W	02:57–03:02	4.42 mi (7.11 km)	75 yd (69 m)	$130,000
EF1	Two houses were damaged in Gibson County, consisting mainly of roof and siding damage. Along the entire path, signs were damaged, utility poles were snapped, and numerous trees were downed.							
EF1	SSW of Bryant to SE of Geneva	Jay	IN	40.5008°N 84.9805°W	03:16–03:22	6.91 mi (11.12 km)	50 yd (46 m)	Unknown
EF1	An intermittent tornado embedded in straight-line wind damage snapped power poles, damaged two houses, and destroyed a garage, a barn, and an outbuilding.							
EF0	W of Van Wert	Van Wert	OH	40.8734°N 84.6304°W	03:19–03:20	0.46 mi (0.74 km)	50 yd (46 m)	Unknown
EF0	A house sustained shingle damage, and a garage was blown out, and a patio was destroyed.							
EF0	N of Huntingburg	Dubois	IN	38.3353°N 86.9500°W	03:22–03:23	0.3 mi (0.48 km)	200 yd (180 m)	Unknown
EF0	A large swath of trees was downed.							
EF1	N of Ireland	Dubois	IN	38.4300°N 87.0397°W	03:22–03:25	3.09 mi (4.97 km)	200 yd (180 m)	Unknown
EF1	A well-constructed 75-foot (23 m) tall grain silo had the top 40 feet (12 m) sheared off, and a large outbuilding near the silo was destroyed, with siding thrown 500 yards (460 m). Straight-line wind damage was observed in the vicinity of the tornado track, with two hog buildings destroyed and a grain silo shifted on its foundation.							
EF0	Haysville	Dubois	IN	38.4819°N 86.9339°W	03:25–03:27	1.93 mi (3.11 km)	200 yd (180 m)	Unknown
EF0	Numerous trees and tree limbs were downed.							
EF1	SW of St. Anthony	Dubois	IN	38.3036°N 86.8425°W	03:26–03:27	0.38 mi (0.61 km)	100 yd (91 m)	Unknown
EF1	A brief tornado damaged a house and downed a few trees.							
EF2	N of Bretzville to NNE of St. Anthony	Dubois	IN	38.3244°N 86.8761°W	03:26–03:29	3.26 mi (5.25 km)	300 yd (270 m)	Unknown
EF2	Several barns and outbuildings were destroyed, and many trees were downed.							
EF2	Roland	Orange	IN	38.5958°N 86.6819°W	03:39–03:40	1.04 mi (1.67 km)	200 yd (180 m)	Unknown
EF2	A house had windows blown in, a cabin lost shingles, a large barn lost its metal roof, and a wood outbuilding was destroyed. Many trees were downed as well.							
EF2	Celina	Mercer	OH	40.5496°N 84.5549°W	03:39–03:42	3.68 mi (5.92 km)	30 yd (27 m)	$340,000
EF2	Several houses and businesses were heavily damaged, while others sustained minor damage. Barns, garages, outbuildings, and vehicles were also destroyed. Numerous trees and power poles were downed along the path.							
EF1	Monticello to NNW of Spencerville	Van Wert, Allen	OH	40.6973°N 84.4255°W	03:40–03:44	4.03 mi (6.49 km)	100 yd (91 m)	Unknown
EF1	Several houses were damaged, sheds and barns were destroyed, and numerous trees were downed.							
EF1	S of French Lick (1st tornado)	Orange	IN	38.4403°N 86.6147°W	03:40–03:41	1.49 mi (2.40 km)	125 yd (114 m)	Unknown
EF1	A large metal barn was destroyed, and numerous trees were downed, with some falling on power poles. At a marina, three metal outbuildings were either damaged or destroyed: one had doors blown in, another had its roof peeled back, and the third was leveled and blown downwind. A pontoon boat was flipped as well.							
EF1	S of French Lick (2nd tornado)	Orange	IN	38.4689°N 86.6017°W	03:40–03:41	0.7 mi (1.1 km)	75 yd (69 m)	Unknown
EF1	A barn was destroyed, a porch was removed from a house, and trees were knocked down.							
EF0	N of St. Mary's	Auglaize	OH	40.5900°N 84.4556°W	03:44–03:48	3.77 mi (6.07 km)	67 yd (61 m)	$55,000
EF0	A small wooden barn was destroyed, houses sustained roof damage, a pontoon boat was flipped, and trees were downed.							
EF0	SSW of Paoli	Orange	IN	38.4997°N 86.5033°W	03:47–03:48	0.46 mi (0.74 km)	100 yd (91 m)	Unknown
EF0	Several trees were downed, and the roof was peeled off a small outbuilding.							
EF0	E of Stephensport to ESE of Payneville	Breckinridge, Meade	KY	37.9114°N 86.4269°W	03:54–04:04	11.46 mi (18.44 km)	150 yd (140 m)	Unknown
EF0	Intermittent tornado damaged several houses, including blowing an attached carport into a field and removing shingles. A barn door was blown in, and numerous trees were snapped or uprooted.							
EF1	N of Cairo	Allen	OH	40.8576°N 84.0820°W	03:58–03:59	0.71 mi (1.14 km)	100 yd (91 m)	Unknown
EF1	Significant damage occurred on a farm, with a house losing its roof and a barn being destroyed. An old school bus was damaged by debris from the barn, and numerous trees has the tops blown out near a railroad.							
EF1	NE of Livonia (1st tornado)	Washington	IN	38.5856°N 86.2558°W	03:59–04:01	1.54 mi (2.48 km)	200 yd (180 m)	Unknown
EF1	A grain bin, two silos, and a large outbuilding were destroyed, a house sustained severe damage, and another house had its roof partially removed and was pelted by driveway gravel. Several trees were downed as well.							
EF0	NE of Livonia (2nd tornado)	Washington	IN	38.5842°N 86.2358°W	04:00–04:01	1.23 mi (1.98 km)	75 yd (69 m)	Unknown
EF0	A grain silo and two barns were damaged, and several trees were downed.							
EF0	NNE of Salem	Washington	IN	38.6381°N 86.0828°W	04:07–04:08	0.65 mi (1.05 km)	50 yd (46 m)	Unknown
EF0	A house sustained roof damage, and two large outbuildings and a grain bin were destroyed.							
EF0	N of Corydon	Harrison	IN	38.2285°N 86.1266°W	04:09–04:10	0.28 mi (0.45 km)	50 yd (46 m)	Unknown
EF0	Numerous trees were either snapped or uprooted by this brief tornado.							
EF0	SW of Little York to NNE of Austin	Washington, Scott	IN	38.6492°N 85.9358°W	04:14–04:27	13.14 mi (21.15 km)	200 yd (180 m)	Unknown
EF0	Many trees were downed and a roof was damaged along an intermittent path.							
EF0	Scottsburg to E of Deputy	Scott, Jefferson	IN	38.6878°N 85.7708°W	04:19–04:31	11.8 mi (19.0 km)	100 yd (91 m)	Unknown
EF0	Numerous houses, several agricultural buildings, and a Holiday Inn hotel were damaged. Numerous trees were downed as well.							
EF0	N of Jeffersonville (1st tornado)	Clark	IN	38.3247°N 85.7303°W	04:28–04:29	0.17 mi (0.27 km)	75 yd (69 m)	Unknown
EF0	A very brief tornado damaged a shed and snapped a few trees.							
EF1	N of Jeffersonville (2nd tornado)	Clark	IN	38.3256°N 85.7328°W	04:28–04:29	1.18 mi (1.90 km)	200 yd (180 m)	Unknown
EF1	About 25 trailers were damaged in a mobile home park, some of which were removed from their foundations and had debris scattered long distances. Site-built homes sustained roof damage, sheds were either damaged or destroyed, a church's south side was blown out, and a trampoline was thrown into a tree. Numerous trees were downed or damaged as well.							
EF0	NE of Oregon	Lucas	OH	41.6800°N 83.4134°W	04:37–04:39	0.78 mi (1.26 km)	25 yd (23 m)	$200,000
EF0	One house was heavily damaged and about 24 others sustained minor damage, mostly to porches, roofs, and siding. A large camper and a small outbuilding were both destroyed, and a couple dozen trees were downed along the path.							
EF1	S of China	Jefferson	IN	38.7962°N 85.3560°W	04:40–04:42	2.34 mi (3.77 km)	125 yd (114 m)	Unknown
EF1	Several outbuildings were severely damaged or destroyed, with a piece of lumber from one being thrown through a house. A large barn was destroyed, other homes and outbuildings were damaged, and numerous trees were either snapped or uprooted.							
EF1	NE of Bryantsburg	Jefferson	IN	38.9062°N 85.3718°W	04:41–04:44	3.21 mi (5.17 km)	100 yd (91 m)	Unknown
EF1	A mobile home was destroyed, several barns sustained extensive roof damage, a cinder-block outbuilding had its roof removed, and a site-built house was damaged. A large garage had its door blown out, much of the roof was removed from a tobacco barn, and trees were downed.							
EF1	NW of La Grange	Oldham	KY	38.4125°N 85.4108°W	04:49–04:50	0.26 mi (0.42 km)	80 yd (73 m)	Unknown
EF1	A barn was destroyed, a house and another barn were damaged, and several trees were snapped.							
EF0	SW of Port Clinton	Ottawa	OH	41.4781°N 83.0453°W	04:55–04:57	1.53 mi (2.46 km)	30 yd (27 m)	$100,000
EF0	Two houses and several outbuildings sustained roof damage, and several trees were downed.							

=== April 20 event ===
List of confirmed tornadoes – Wednesday, April 20, 2011
EF#	Location	County / Parish	State	Start Coord.	Time (UTC)	Path length	Max width	Damage
EF1	NNE of Antioch	Switzerland	IN	38.8604°N 84.8842°W	05:04–05:06	1.76 mi (2.83 km)	67 yd (61 m)	$90,000
EF1	Two houses lost their roofs, and three barns were destroyed north of Warsaw, Kentucky.							
EF0	Frankfort area	Franklin	KY	38.1889°N 84.8967°W	05:28–05:33	4.81 mi (7.74 km)	30 yd (27 m)	$90,000
EF0	Trees were snapped along the track, and a few houses sustained minor damage, with the most concentrated damage in the area of the Kentucky State Capitol and the Frankfort Cemetery.							
EF1	NE of Georgetown	Scott	KY	38.2517°N 84.4504°W	05:54–05:55	0.51 mi (0.82 km)	50 yd (46 m)	$35,000
EF1	A tied-down trailer was overturned, several outbuildings were either heavily damaged or destroyed, a brick garage wall was buckled, and several trees were snapped.							
EF1	New Holland to SW of Williamsport	Pickaway	OH	39.5476°N 83.2539°W	06:14–06:19	4.22 mi (6.79 km)	200 yd (180 m)	$75,000
EF1	A brick building was damaged, a grain bin and three barns were destroyed, a trailer was overturned, and trees and tree limbs were knocked down.							
EF1	S of Groveport	Franklin	OH	39.8072°N 82.9183°W	06:22–06:25	2.54 mi (4.09 km)	100 yd (91 m)	$35,000
EF1	Two houses sustained significant roof damage, and a large wood frame storage shed with metal siding was destroyed. One power pole was snapped, several others were bent over, and many trees were downed.							
EF0	ENE of Groveport	Franklin	OH	39.8551°N 82.8505°W	06:26–06:27	0.12 mi (0.19 km)	50 yd (46 m)	$30,000
EF0	Twelve greenhouses sustained varying degrees of damage; the farthest west of the twelve was nearly destroyed. A metal door on an adjacent warehouse was bent, and a small metal shed was heavily damaged. Small trees in the greenhouses were pulled toward the center of the path, and plant transport carts pulled from a loading dock into a small pond.							
EF1	NW of Franklin	Simpson	KY	36.7364°N 86.6439°W	06:30–06:33	3.67 mi (5.91 km)	100 yd (91 m)	Unknown
EF1	A barn was destroyed, a second barn sustained roof damage, and at least 100 trees were snapped or uprooted.							
EF1	E of Baltimore to N of Thurston	Fairfield	OH	39.8506°N 82.5908°W	06:39–06:42	2.58 mi (4.15 km)	300 yd (270 m)	$45,000
EF1	A house and a barn were damaged, a garage was destroyed, and numerous large trees were snapped and uprooted.							
EF2	Heath	Licking	OH	40.0233°N 82.4741°W	06:42–06:45	3.85 mi (6.20 km)	100 yd (91 m)	$45,000
EF2	The tornado began just west of the Newark–Heath Airport and moved east-northeastward through Heath. Several houses and businesses were damaged, including a store that lost part of its front sign, a business that lost part of its metal roof, and a masonry building that was heavily damaged, with one wall completely collapsed and another partially collapsed. Numerous trees were snapped or uprooted along the path as well.							
EF1	ESE of Newark	Licking	OH	40.0485°N 82.2822°W	06:51–06:52	0.2 mi (0.32 km)	75 yd (69 m)	$40,000
EF1	A mobile home was overturned, with the roof and on side being removed and blown into trees. A house sustained roof damage, and several trees were snapped or uprooted.							
EF0	Piketon	Pike	OH	39.0601°N 83.014°W	06:51–06:52	0.2 mi (0.32 km)	50 yd (46 m)	$10,000
EF0	A brief tornado damaged a house, a mobile home, and several buildings at the Pike County fairgrounds. A shed was destroyed, and debris was strewn across the fairgrounds.							
EF0	Zahns Corners	Pike	OH	39.0640°N 82.9610°W	06:53–06:54	0.07 mi (0.11 km)	50 yd (46 m)	$70,000
EF0	Just east of Piketon, a second brief tornado damaged several houses and mobile homes (one mobile home was blown of its foundation), destroyed a storage shed, and twisted or knocked down large tree limbs.							
EF1	SSW of Moulton	Lawrence	AL	34.3271°N 87.3742°W	09:58–10:02	2.62 mi (4.22 km)	100 yd (91 m)	$0
EF1	The tornado moved through the William B. Bankhead National Forest on the east side of the Sipsey Wilderness. Many trees were downed along the path, which was embedded within a larger area of straight-line wind damage.							
EF0	WNW of Junction	Kimble	TX	30.4900°N 99.8600°W	23:37–23:40	0.1 mi (0.16 km)	50 yd (46 m)	$0
EF0	Brief tornado along Interstate 10 at mile 449 with no damage.							
EF1	SW of Tomnolen to WSW of Eupora	Webster	MS	33.4723°N 89.3745°W	01:09–01:15	3.29 mi (5.29 km)	150 yd (140 m)	$100,000
EF1	Many trees were uprooted, and several houses were damaged, some of them by fallen trees.							

=== April 21 event ===
List of confirmed tornadoes – Thursday, April 21, 2011
EF#	Location	County / Parish	State	Start Coord.	Time (UTC)	Path length	Max width	Damage
EF0	N of Longfellow	Pecos	TX	30.4725°N 102.6785°W	22:51–23:09	3.79 mi (6.10 km)	300 yd (270 m)	$0
EF0	A tornado was confirmed based on public reports, photographs, and radar data. No known damage occurred.							
EF0	SSE of Fort Stockton	Pecos	TX	30.570°N 102.677°W	23:18–23:23	8.09 mi (13.02 km)	200 yd (180 m)	$0
EF0	A tornado was confirmed based on public reports and photographs, near the area of the previous tornado. No known damage occurred.							
EF2	N of Sanderson	Terrell	TX	30.2045°N 102.4448°W	23:45–23:50	7.82 mi (12.59 km)	800 yd (730 m)	$100,000
EF2	A house and a barn were destroyed, and several cedar trees were snapped or uprooted.							
EF1	NW of Stith	Jones	TX	32.5697°N 99.9799°W	01:52–02:00	4.96 mi (7.98 km)	200 yd (180 m)	Unknown
EF1	Several houses sustained roof and window damage and barns, fences, and a porch were destroyed. A steel grain bin was rolled about 250 yards (230 m), a gooseneck trailer was thrown about 100 yards (91 m), numerous trees were downed, and a few farm animals were killed.							
EF0	WSW of Hawley	Jones	TX	32.58°N 99.91°W	01:55	0.1 mi (0.16 km)	100 yd (91 m)	$0
EF0	A rope tornado confirmed by spotters remained over open country with no damage.							

=== April 22 event ===
List of confirmed tornadoes – Friday, April 22, 2011
EF#	Location	County / Parish	State	Start Coord.	Time (UTC)	Path length	Max width	Damage
EF0	SW of Welty	Okfuskee	OK	35.6057°N 96.4385°W	23:03–23:04	0.5 mi (0.80 km)	150 yd (140 m)	$0
EF0	Large cone tornado with no damage.							
EF0	Eastern Versailles	Woodford	KY	38.04°N 84.72°W	23:07–23:08	0.75 mi (1.21 km)	60 yd (55 m)	Unknown
EF0	Roofs and fences sustained minor damage, and trees were downed on the east side of Versailles.							
EF0	E of Versailles	Woodford	KY	38.05°N 84.66°W	23:13	0.25 mi (0.40 km)	40 yd (37 m)	Unknown
EF0	Several trees were downed, and a few roofs were damaged.							
EF0	N of Kansas	Delaware	OK	36.2724°N 94.8000°W	23:16	0.1 mi (0.16 km)	50 yd (46 m)	$0
EF0	Brief tornado with no damage.							
EF0	SE of Cherokee City	Benton	AR	36.2877°N 94.5465°W	23:41	0.1 mi (0.16 km)	50 yd (46 m)	$0
EF0	Brief tornado over open country with no damage.							
EF0	NW of Highfill	Benton	AR	36.3019°N 94.3786°W	00:05	0.1 mi (0.16 km)	50 yd (46 m)	$0
EF0	Brief tornado near the Northwest Arkansas Regional Airport with no damage.							
EF1	WNW of New Melle to SW of Dardenne Prairie	St. Charles	MO	38.7362°N 90.9388°W	00:17–00:32	7.35 mi (11.83 km)	250 yd (230 m)	Unknown
EF1	One house lost half the roof, and its attached garage was destroyed. A nearby van was pushed approximately 30 yards (27 m) from a driveway into an open grassy area. Numerous other houses sustained mainly minor roof damage, a horse arena was demolished, and several barns and outbuildings were heavily damaged or destroyed. Many trees were downed along the path. This was the precursor to the St. Louis EF4 tornado.							
EF1	SE of Moodys	Cherokee	OK	36.0134°N 94.9320°W	00:18–00:19	1 mi (1.6 km)	200 yd (180 m)	$0
EF1	Several trees were uprooted.							
EF0	NW of Henryetta	Okmulgee	OK	35.4877°N 96.0814°W	00:19–00:20	0.5 mi (0.80 km)	100 yd (91 m)	$0
EF0	Brief tornado over open country with no damage.							
EF0	Bentonville	Benton	AR	36.3771°N 94.1991°W	00:21	0.1 mi (0.16 km)	50 yd (46 m)	$0
EF0	Brief tornado over open fields with no damage.							
EF0	SW of Byars	McClain	OK	34.8645°N 97.0663°W	00:45–00:48	0.5 mi (0.80 km)	150 yd (140 m)	$0
EF0	Storm chasers observed this tornado, which produced no damage.							
EF1	E of Byars	McClain	OK	34.8700°N 97.0324°W	00:59	0.2 mi (0.32 km)	30 yd (27 m)	$5,000
EF1	Trees and power lines were downed, and an outbuilding was damaged.							
EF4	NW of St. Louis to Northeastern Granite City, IL	St. Louis (MO), St. Louis (city), Madison (IL)	MO, IL	38.7364°N 90.4863°W	00:59–01:31	21.3 mi (34.3 km)	880 yd (800 m)	>$250,000,000
EF4	See article on this tornado – Five people were injured.							
EF0	NW of Stratford	Garvin	OK	34.8409°N 97.0099°W	01:02–01:05	0.4 mi (0.64 km)	50 yd (46 m)	$0
EF0	Storm chasers observed this tornado southeast of Byers, which produced no damage.							
EF1	E of Mill Spring	Wayne	MO	37.0674°N 90.5611°W	01:10–01:12	2.07 mi (3.33 km)	300 yd (270 m)	$100,000
EF1	A mobile home was destroyed by a falling tree, several outbuildings and a garage were destroyed, and hundreds of trees were uprooted. Some pine trees were snapped off 3 feet (0.91 m) above the ground.							
EF0	SE of Fame	McIntosh	OK	35.3549°N 95.6265°W	01:14	0.1 mi (0.16 km)	50 yd (46 m)	$0
EF0	This brief tornado occurred over Eufaula Lake. No damage was reported.							
EF2	SW of Highland to S of Greenville	Madison, Clinton, Bond	IL	38.7034°N 89.7144°W	01:55–02:30	18.19 mi (29.27 km)	700 yd (640 m)	Unknown
EF2	Several barns, sheds, and farm buildings were either damaged or destroyed, and several homes sustained roof and structural damage. A farm house lost its entire roof structure and had the front wall partially collapsed, a hog farm sustained extensive damage, and a few power poles were snapped. Many trees were snapped or uprooted, with one tree falling on a home and a second falling on a carport.							
EF2	Waterloo	Monroe	IL	38.3493°N 90.1548°W	01:50–01:55	3.52 mi (5.66 km)	90 yd (82 m)	Unknown
EF2	This tornado began on the north side of Waterloo and moved east of town. Several homes and businesses sustained varying degrees of roof and structural damage, two large air conditioners were thrown 30 yards (27 m) from the roof of a business, and a large garage was destroyed, with debris from a garage carried 30 to 40 yards (27 to 37 m) away. Four power poles were snapped, and numerous trees, some large, were snapped or uprooted. A minor injury occurred at Canterbury Manor Nursing Center due to flying glass from a broken window.							
EF1	Paderborn	St. Clair	IL	38.3599°N 90.0468°W	02:02–02:06	1.75 mi (2.82 km)	80 yd (73 m)	Unknown
EF1	Six homes sustained roof damage, two power poles were snapped, and numerous trees were snapped or uprooted.							
EF2	NE of Sturgis to SSW of Robards	Union, Webster, Henderson	KY	37.5892°N 87.8407°W	03:50–04:05	15.51 mi (24.96 km)	300 yd (270 m)	$880,000
EF2	Several barns and grain bins were destroyed in Union County. The tornado then moved through Webster County, where several houses were damaged in Poole. Three houses lost their roofs completely, while other homes sustained shingle loss or were damaged by falling trees. Several garages were damaged or destroyed, along with more barns and grain bins, with two grain bins wrapped around the back side of a house. Another barn and garage were destroyed southwest of Robards in Henderson County. Many trees were snapped or uprooted along the path. Two people sustained minor injuries.							
EF0	Stanley	Daviess	KY	37.82°N 87.24°W	04:27–04:28	0.2 mi (0.32 km)	40 yd (37 m)	$3,000
EF0	A brief, weak tornado was witnessed by law enforcement near Stanley. Power lines were downed.							

=== April 23 event ===
List of confirmed tornadoes – Saturday, April 23, 2011
EF#	Location	County / Parish	State	Start Coord.	Time (UTC)	Path length	Max width	Damage
EF0	N of Seymour	Jackson	IN	38.9848°N 85.8968°W	05:35–05:42	3.79 mi (6.10 km)	50 yd (46 m)	$30,000
EF0	The tornado skipped southeast just north of Seymour. Several structures were damaged, including a house that lost part of its roof.							
EF0	E of Connersville	Harrison	KY	38.3786°N 84.3822°W	10:09–10:10	0.53 mi (0.85 km)	75 yd (69 m)	Unknown
EF0	Two large barns lost tin roofing, a small garage was completely destroyed, two small outbuildings were damaged, and pieces of oak fencing were tossed around. Around two dozen large trees were snapped or uprooted along the path.							
EF0	W of Dexter	Stoddard	MO	36.7924°N 90.0024°W	18:31–18:32	0.52 mi (0.84 km)	80 yd (73 m)	$50,000
EF0	A large storage building, a garage, and a shed were destroyed, and the roof of a house was damaged by a falling tree.							
EF0	Folsom	Grant	KY	38.7097°N 84.7487°W	18:59–19:00	1.14 mi (1.83 km)	25 yd (23 m)	$25,000
EF0	A garage and barn were destroyed, a home and a trailer were damaged, and numerous trees were downed.							
EF1	ENE of Dry Ridge	Grant, Pendleton	KY	38.6985°N 84.5393°W	19:10–19:15	4.28 mi (6.89 km)	50 yd (46 m)	$35,000
EF1	Several houses were damaged, a barn was heavily damaged, and many trees were downed.							
EF1	Visalia	Kenton	KY	38.9123°N 84.4522°W	19:14–19:15	0.17 mi (0.27 km)	50 yd (46 m)	$15,000
EF1	A brief tornado downed numerous trees, damaged an elementary school, and destroyed an outbuilding.							
EF2	Klondike to Urbandale	Alexander	IL	37.0728°N 89.2284°W	19:15–19:19	2.9 mi (4.7 km)	175 yd (160 m)	$700,000
EF2	A 20-foot (6.1 m) tall hangar was destroyed at Cairo Regional Airport along with two light aircraft and a camper. Debris was blown onto the airport runways, and an anemometer at the airport was read at 118 mph (190 km/h). Elsewhere, a mobile home was destroyed, and two homes sustained minor roof damage. Several trees were snapped or uprooted, damaging two trailers and a house.							
EF1	Barlow	Ballard	KY	37.0500°N 89.0554°W	19:29–19:32	1.6 mi (2.6 km)	80 yd (73 m)	$50,000
EF1	A metal wall was damaged at a maintenance building in Barlow, and the roof was blown off a storage building at city hall. A barn sustained roof damage, a carport was blown into a tree, and two homes and another carport sustained minor roof damage. Many large trees were downed, some of which fell on homes and caused damage. Three power poles were snapped as well, cutting power to the city water plant.							
EF2	Bardwell	Carlisle	KY	36.8802°N 89.0328°W	19:30–19:35	4 mi (6.4 km)	450 yd (410 m)	$2,000,000
EF2	The tornado began northwest of Bardwell and moved southeastward through town. A steel building was destroyed, along with entire walls of older two-story brick business buildings. Debris blocked U.S. 51 and several secondary roads. About thirty large trees were uprooted, along with about a hundred smaller trees, and over a dozen wooden power poles were broken off. Pieces of wood were driven into steel rooftops, walls of homes, and the ground, many windows were blown out, and about twenty homes and businesses sustained partial or total roof loss. A historic church sustained about US$1 million in damage as well. Two people sustained minor injuries.							
EF1	Northern Metropolis	Massac	IL	37.1849°N 88.7949°W	19:47–19:59	6.64 mi (10.69 km)	250 yd (230 m)	$450,000
EF1	This tornado began along the Ohio River and moved eastward through the northern part of Metropolis. Power poles were damaged at a barge-loading facility, the roof was blown off a trailer, and roof and power pole damage occurred at an industrial complex. Just east of the complex, portable buildings were destroyed, and a trailer was overturned. On the north side of Metropolis, homes sustained minor roof damage, more power poles were snapped, and several trees were downed, causing damage to a garage, two vehicles, and two additional homes. Along Interstate 24, part of the metal roof was torn off a large building in an industrial park, a trailer was overturned, and a barn was heavily damaged before the tornado lifted just north of U.S. 45.							
EF1	S of Red Star to NE of Mount Judea	Madison, Newton	AR	35.8250°N 93.5305°W	00:58–01:54	28.27 mi (45.50 km)	880 yd (800 m)	$500,000
EF1	Hundreds of trees were downed in the Ozark National Forest, with several falling on homes and vehicles. Several outbuildings were damaged, a chicken house and a barn were destroyed, and many power poles and lines were blown down.							
EF0	NNW of Sidney	Comanche	TX	31.98°N 98.74°W	01:13	0.01 mi (0.016 km)	30 yd (27 m)	$0
EF0	Brief tornado over open land with no damage.							

=== April 24 event ===
List of confirmed tornadoes – Sunday, April 24, 2011
EF#	Location	County / Parish	State	Start Coord.	Time (UTC)	Path length	Max width	Damage
EF1	Neelyville	Butler	MO	36.5503°N 90.5258°W	05:02–05:05	2.97 mi (4.78 km)	100 yd (91 m)	$175,000
EF1	The tornado began immediately southwest of Neelyville just after midnight and moved northeast through town. Eight structures sustained minor roof and siding damage, a bank window was blown out, two mobile homes were destroyed, and six others were damaged.							
EF0	SW of Winnemucca	Humboldt	NV	40.87°N 117.85°W	17:55–18:00	0.52 mi (0.84 km)	25 yd (23 m)	$0
EF0	This tornado was observed by several people but remained over open country with no damage.							
EF0	N of Baird (1st tornado)	Callahan	TX	32.4844°N 99.4016°W	20:28–20:32	1.21 mi (1.95 km)	30 yd (27 m)	$0
EF0	A few tree limbs were broken.							
EF0	Ibex	Shackelford	TX	32.68°N 99.12°W	20:55–20:58	0.1 mi (0.16 km)	50 yd (46 m)	$0
EF0	Brief tornado uprooted a few trees.							
EF0	ENE of Potosi	Taylor	TX	32.34°N 99.63°W	21:22–21:27	0.1 mi (0.16 km)	50 yd (46 m)	$0
EF0	Brief tornado along the Taylor–Callahan county line with no damage.							
EF0	N of Baird (2nd tornado)	Callahan	TX	32.4444°N 99.4180°W	22:04–22:07	1.74 mi (2.80 km)	30 yd (27 m)	$0
EF0	Rope tornado photographed by storm chasers. No damage was reported.							
EF0	SE of Scipio	Pittsburg	OK	35.0142°N 95.9263°W	22:05–22:06	0.5 mi (0.80 km)	100 yd (91 m)	$15,000
EF0	A barn and a house sustained roof damage, and trees and tree limbs were snapped.							
EF0	N of Baird (3rd tornado)	Callahan	TX	32.4977°N 99.3851°W	22:15–22:18	0.1 mi (0.16 km)	50 yd (46 m)	$0
EF0	A few tree limbs were broken.							
EF0	NNE of Baird	Callahan	TX	32.4821°N 99.3810°W	22:24–22:35	5.95 mi (9.58 km)	500 yd (460 m)	$0
EF0	This large multiple-vortex tornado remained over open country with no damage.							
EF0	SE of Monroe	Le Flore	OK	34.9698°N 94.5075°W	00:03	0.3 mi (0.48 km)	150 yd (140 m)	$5,000
EF0	A house sustained roof damage, and tree limbs were snapped.							
EF0	NW of Coleman	Coleman	TX	31.9286°N 99.5701°W	01:27–01:32	0.1 mi (0.16 km)	50 yd (46 m)	$0
EF0	Brief tornado pictured by a storm chaser with no damage.							
EF1	Umpire to Mineola	Howard	AR	34.2801°N 94.0475°W	03:54–03:59	3.42 mi (5.50 km)	75 yd (69 m)	$70,000
EF1	This tornado moved northeast from Umpire toward Mineola along Highway 84. Half the roof was torn from a house, a large storage building was destroyed, and a chicken house sustained severe damage. Many trees were snapped or uprooted along the path.							

=== April 25 to April 28 events ===
A total of 368 tornadoes touched down in this extremely large, record-breaking tornado outbreak, 367 in the United States and one in Canada.

Confirmed tornadoes by Enhanced Fujita rating
EFU	EF0	EF1	EF2	EF3	EF4	EF5	Total
0	137	143	49	23	11	4	367

=== April 30 event ===
List of confirmed tornadoes – Saturday, April 30, 2011
EF#	Location	County / Parish	State	Start Coord.	Time (UTC)	Path length	Max width	Damage
EF0	WSW of Hainesville	Wood	TX	32.7078°N 95.4021°W	00:06–00:09	1.75 mi (2.82 km)	75 yd (69 m)	$0
EF0	Many trees were snapped or uprooted.							
EF0	ENE of Thomas	Upshur	TX	32.8596°N 95.0500°W	01:26–01:30	2.22 mi (3.57 km)	75 yd (69 m)	$0
EF0	A few trees were snapped or uprooted.							
EF0	Hughes Springs	Cass	TX	32.9857°N 94.6410°W	02:24–02:32	2.61 mi (4.20 km)	150 yd (140 m)	$5,000
EF0	Several houses sustained minor damage, mainly to roofs, a business had shingles removed, and a storage building was damaged. Several trees and power lines were knocked down, including six large pecan trees.							

== See also ==
- Tornadoes of 2011
- List of United States tornadoes from January to March 2011
- List of United States tornadoes in May 2011
