= List of tornadoes in the outbreak and derecho of April 19–22, 2011 =

From April 19–22, 2011, a major tornado outbreak and derecho affected the Central United States. This outbreak came days before the 2011 Super Outbreak, the largest tornado outbreak on record.

== Confirmed tornadoes ==
Confirmed tornadoes by Enhanced Fujita rating
EFU	EF0	EF1	EF2	EF3	EF4	EF5	Total
0	46	49	13	1	1	0	110

=== April 19 event ===
List of confirmed tornadoes – Tuesday, April 19, 2011 (Note: All dates are based on the local time zone where the tornado touched down; however, all times are in Coordinated Universal Time and dates are split at midnight CDT for consistency.)
EF#	Location	County / Parish	State	Start Coord.	Time (UTC)	Path length	Max width	Damage (Note: All damage totals are in 2011 USD unless otherwise stated.)
EF1	SW of Bowling Green	Pike	MO	39.2965°N 91.2967°W	21:00–21:08	4.12 mi (6.63 km)	150 yd (140 m)	Unknown
EF1	Two farmhouses were heavily damaged, and a barn, farm equipment, and several outbuildings were destroyed. Another barn was damaged, and many trees were downed along the path.							
EF0	Clarksville	Pike	MO	39.3630°N 90.9018°W	21:36–21:37	0.4 mi (0.64 km)	50 yd (46 m)	Unknown
EF0	Several houses sustained roof damage, a church had broken windows, and several carports and fences were damaged. Trees were downed as well. The tornado dissipated while crossing the Mississippi River and was accompanied by softball-sized hail.							
EF0	N of Fewell	Pushmataha	OK	34.5345°N 95.0300°W	22:58	0.1 mi (0.16 km)	50 yd (46 m)	$0
EF0	Brief tornado with no damage.							
EF3	N of Girard	Macoupin	IL	39.4427°N 89.8250°W	22:58–23:05	5.1 mi (8.2 km)	200 yd (180 m)	Unknown
EF3	See section on this tornado – 2 people were injured while several cows were killed.							
EF1	Honobia	Pushmataha, Le Flore	OK	34.5320°N 94.9631°W	23:07–23:15	3.5 mi (5.6 km)	100 yd (91 m)	$0
EF1	This tornado was caught on camera by a storm chaser. Several large trees were snapped in the Honobia area.							
EF2	N of Farmersville	Montgomery	IL	39.4614°N 89.6483°W	23:08–23:12	3.16 mi (5.09 km)	150 yd (140 m)	Unknown
EF2	Three power poles were snapped, a grain bin was rolled across Interstate 55 and deposited in a tree, and two machine sheds were destroyed. Numerous trees snapped or uprooted as well.							
EF2	S of Honey Bend	Montgomery	IL	39.2476°N 89.6611°W	23:15–23:19	3.51 mi (5.65 km)	200 yd (180 m)	Unknown
EF2	Several outbuildings, sheds, and silos were destroyed, and other outbuildings and barns sustained minor to moderate damage. Numerous homes were damaged, with a large portion of the roof on one home being removed. A two-story log home sustained extensive damage as well. Trees were downed, about a dozen power poles were snapped, and power lines were knocked down onto Interstate 55, blocking traffic for roughly four hours.							
EF1	SSW of Kincaid	Christian	IL	39.5464°N 89.4616°W	23:17–23:20	1.99 mi (3.20 km)	100 yd (91 m)	$90,000
EF1	Several grain bins and a large farm storage building were destroyed.							
EF0	SSW of Morrisonville	Christian	IL	39.3765°N 89.5106°W	23:30–23:32	3.48 mi (5.60 km)	100 yd (91 m)	$95,000
EF0	The roof was torn off a hog pen, the north doors of a large metal farm building were collapsed, and a small barn was destroyed. Several power poles were knocked down as well.							
EF1	NE of Taylorville	Christian	IL	39.5717°N 89.2741°W	23:32–23:33	0.91 mi (1.46 km)	100 yd (91 m)	$60,000
EF1	Eight empty railroad cars were knocked over.							
EF0	NW of Zafra	Le Flore	OK	34.5823°N 94.5823°W	23:45	0.1 mi (0.16 km)	75 yd (69 m)	$0
EF0	Brief tornado with no damage.							
EF0	N of Zafra	Le Flore	OK	34.5734°N 94.5407°W	23:48–23:52	3 mi (4.8 km)	125 yd (114 m)	$0
EF0	The tornado remained over open country and caused no damage.							
EF1	S of Clubb to S of Cascade	Wayne	MO	37.2041°N 90.3500°W	00:43–00:50	5.16 mi (8.30 km)	500 yd (460 m)	$25,000
EF1	Many trees were snapped or uprooted, mostly in heavily forested conservation land.							
EF0	Patton	Bollinger	MO	37.4947°N 90.0228°W	00:55–00:56	0.5 mi (0.80 km)	100 yd (91 m)	$15,000
EF0	A barn was destroyed, and many trees were downed.							
EF1	NE of Chrisman	Edgar	IL	39.8245°N 87.6562°W	00:59–01:01	1.14 mi (1.83 km)	100 yd (91 m)	$140,000
EF1	The roof was torn off a house, two barns were destroyed, and a garage was damaged.							
EF0	NE of Henning	Vermilion	IL	40.3064°N 87.7006°W	01:02–01:05	2.71 mi (4.36 km)	25 yd (23 m)	$225,000
EF0	Several houses sustained roof, siding, and awning damage, and trees and power poles were knocked down.							
EF1	WNW of Newport to Wallace to Crawfordsville	Vermillion, Parke, Fountain, Montgomery	IN	39.8979°N 87.4796°W	01:10–01:40	31.15 mi (50.13 km)	100 yd (91 m)	$85,000
EF1	A long-track tornado downed trees and power lines and damaged houses and sheds. One shed in Vermillion County was destroyed, and another structure in Park County was damaged. The tornado was downgraded from EF2 to EF1 in final analysis.							
EF1	E of Rossville	Vermilion	IL	40.3661°N 87.5862°W	01:11–01:14	2.56 mi (4.12 km)	100 yd (91 m)	$360,000
EF1	Two houses, six grain bins, two sheds, a garage, a combine, and several pieces of farming equipment were damaged.							
EF0	WSW of Elkville to E of Dowell	Jackson	IL	37.9000°N 89.2630°W	01:35–01:40	3.94 mi (6.34 km)	100 yd (91 m)	$70,000
EF0	Several carports, a camper, and a garage were destroyed. Numerous homes and barns sustained roof damage, an amateur radio tower was bent over, and numerous trees were uprooted.							
EF1	SW of Royalton	Franklin	IL	37.8577°N 89.1356°W	01:40–01:41	0.3 mi (0.48 km)	50 yd (46 m)	$80,000
EF1	Several houses sustained roof and structural damage, with one having partial roof loss. Trees were downed, and large tree limbs were driven into a house and barn.							
EF1	S of Lafayette	Tippecanoe	IN	40.3453°N 86.8953°W	01:40–01:42	0.71 mi (1.14 km)	100 yd (91 m)	$80,000
EF1	Many large trees snapped or uprooted, with some landing on homes and one destroying a garage. Downgraded from EF2 to EF1 in final analysis.							
EF1	Benton	Franklin	IL	38.0029°N 88.9200°W	01:49	0.15 mi (0.24 km)	50 yd (46 m)	$10,000
EF1	Large oak trees were snapped and thrown several yards, other trees were uprooted, and a fence was damaged.							
EF0	ESE of Buck Creek	Tippecanoe	IN	40.4766°N 86.7612°W	01:50–01:52	2.64 mi (4.25 km)	50 yd (46 m)	$15,000
EF0	A barn lost parts of its roof and siding.							
EF1	NW of Thorntown	Boone	IN	40.1362°N 86.6336°W	01:55–01:56	0.64 mi (1.03 km)	50 yd (46 m)	$10,000
EF1	Numerous trees were snapped, and a barn was destroyed.							
EF1	E of Centralia	Marion	IL	38.5233°N 89.0708°W	02:02–02:03	0.36 mi (0.58 km)	75 yd (69 m)	Unknown
EF1	The roof of an attached garage on a home was uplifted and thrown, with a 2x4 driven into another part of the roof. Another home sustained minor roof damage, a trampoline was thrown, a small outbuilding was damaged, and a pole barn was collapsed. Several trees were uprooted as well.							
EF1	N of Mount Vernon	Jefferson	IL	38.3476°N 88.9352°W	02:03–02:07	4.27 mi (6.87 km)	100 yd (91 m)	$70,000
EF1	Several houses sustained minor shingle damage, awnings and overhangs were destroyed, and many trees were snapped or uprooted.							
EF1	SE of Bluford	Jefferson	IL	38.3147°N 88.7304°W	02:06–02:08	1.43 mi (2.30 km)	100 yd (91 m)	$90,000
EF1	A house sustained heavy roof damage, several barns and sheds were either heavily damaged or destroyed, and many trees were snapped or uprooted.							
EF1	SE of McLeansboro	Hamilton	IL	38.0386°N 88.4520°W	02:19–02:24	3.36 mi (5.41 km)	150 yd (140 m)	$150,000
EF1	A small grain bin was destroyed, and hundreds of trees were uprooted.							
EF0	NNE of Adamsboro	Cass	IN	40.81°N 86.26°W	02:19	220 yd (200 m)	25 yd (23 m)	Unknown
EF0	A brief tornado destroyed a pole barn.							
EF0	E of Twelve Mile	Cass	IN	40.87°N 86.20°W	02:20	50 yd (46 m)	25 yd (23 m)	Unknown
EF0	This brief tornado shifted an outbuilding off its foundation, carried its roof into a field, and bent a TV antenna.							
EF0	W of Randles	Cape Girardeau	MO	37.1300°N 89.8708°W	02:27	0.1 mi (0.16 km)	40 yd (37 m)	$20,000
EF0	A brief tornado downed a few trees and power lines and blew out a window of a house.							
EF2	SSE of Carmi	White	IL	37.9925°N 88.1340°W	02:28–02:32	1.8 mi (2.9 km)	125 yd (114 m)	$2,000,000
EF2	Two farms were severely damaged, with barns and over a dozen grain bins destroyed, irrigation pivots overturned, and an equipment shed unroofed. Trees and power poles were knocked down, a 7-ton (6,350 kg) truck was flipped, and a large house sustained considerable roof damage, wall collapse, and blown out windows.							
EF1	ENE of Carmi	White	IL	38.0956°N 88.1012°W	02:30–02:32	1.44 mi (2.32 km)	100 yd (91 m)	$300,000
EF1	A few barns and grain bins were destroyed, the roof was torn off a farm house, with windows also broken, and a mobile home was blown off its foundation. Power poles were snapped, and numerous trees were downed as well.							
EF2	SE of Fairfield to SSW of Mount Erie	Wayne	IL	38.3268°N 88.3021°W	02:30–02:37	10.57 mi (17.01 km)	150 yd (140 m)	$400,000
EF2	A house had part of its roof removed and separation of walls, a machine shed and several grain bins were destroyed, and a large tank was thrown about 150 yards (140 m). Dozens of trees were snapped or uprooted, about a dozen power poles were snapped, and an outbuilding was blown across a highway. Two people were injured.							
EF1	WSW of Fairmount	Grant	IN	40.3945°N 85.7099°W	02:41–02:44	2.53 mi (4.07 km)	150 yd (140 m)	$100,000
EF1	Several houses were damaged, with one having part of the roof and siding ripped off and windows broken. Trees were downed as well.							
EF2	W of Keensburg to N of Mt. Carmel	Wabash	IL	38.3500°N 87.9475°W	02:48–02:55	11.25 mi (18.11 km)	250 yd (230 m)	$2,500,000
EF2	Three steel transmission towers were bent down, and a single-wide mobile home was demolished, with the frame being blown about 50 yards (46 m). A grain bin was blown roughly one mile (1.6 km) into a tree line, three more grain bins and several barns were destroyed, and machine sheds were unroofed or had collapsed walls. Numerous houses sustained minor to moderate roof damage, smaller sheds were destroyed, power poles were snapped, and hundreds of trees were snapped or uprooted.							
EF1	W of Upland	Grant	IN	40.4519°N 85.5370°W	02:48–02:51	2.9 mi (4.7 km)	50 yd (46 m)	Unknown
EF1	Homes sustained minor damage, and numerous trees were snapped.							
EF1	NW of Allendale	Wabash	IL	38.5300°N 87.7866°W	02:53–02:56	2.75 mi (4.43 km)	125 yd (114 m)	$50,000
EF1	Numerous trees were snapped or uprooted, including dense groves of pine and cedar, and power poles were knocked down. A mobile home was rolled, siding was blown off a house, and a back porch was blown off.							
EF1	SSW of Allendale, IL to NW of Decker, IN	Knox	IN	38.5301°N 87.5332°W	02:54–03:02	10.91 mi (17.56 km)	75 yd (69 m)	$206,000
EF1	A large metal building was destroyed, another structure had windows blown in, and several high-tension towers and lines were downed.							
EF1	Wheatonville to SE of Buckskin	Warrick, Gibson	IN	38.1800°N 87.4700°W	02:57–03:02	4.42 mi (7.11 km)	75 yd (69 m)	$130,000
EF1	Two houses were damaged in Gibson County, consisting mainly of roof and siding damage. Along the entire path, signs were damaged, utility poles were snapped, and numerous trees were downed.							
EF1	SSW of Bryant to SE of Geneva	Jay	IN	40.5008°N 84.9805°W	03:16–03:22	6.91 mi (11.12 km)	50 yd (46 m)	Unknown
EF1	An intermittent tornado embedded in straight-line wind damage snapped power poles, damaged two houses, and destroyed a garage, a barn, and an outbuilding.							
EF0	W of Van Wert	Van Wert	OH	40.8734°N 84.6304°W	03:19–03:20	0.46 mi (0.74 km)	50 yd (46 m)	Unknown
EF0	A house sustained shingle damage, and a garage was blown out, and a patio was destroyed.							
EF0	N of Huntingburg	Dubois	IN	38.3353°N 86.9500°W	03:22–03:23	0.3 mi (0.48 km)	200 yd (180 m)	Unknown
EF0	A large swath of trees was downed.							
EF1	N of Ireland	Dubois	IN	38.4300°N 87.0397°W	03:22–03:25	3.09 mi (4.97 km)	200 yd (180 m)	Unknown
EF1	A well-constructed 75-foot (23 m) tall grain silo had the top 40 feet (12 m) sheared off, and a large outbuilding near the silo was destroyed, with siding thrown 500 yards (460 m). Straight-line wind damage was observed in the vicinity of the tornado track, with two hog buildings destroyed and a grain silo shifted on its foundation.							
EF0	Haysville	Dubois	IN	38.4819°N 86.9339°W	03:25–03:27	1.93 mi (3.11 km)	200 yd (180 m)	Unknown
EF0	Numerous trees and tree limbs were downed.							
EF1	SW of St. Anthony	Dubois	IN	38.3036°N 86.8425°W	03:26–03:27	0.38 mi (0.61 km)	100 yd (91 m)	Unknown
EF1	A brief tornado damaged a house and downed a few trees.							
EF2	N of Bretzville to NNE of St. Anthony	Dubois	IN	38.3244°N 86.8761°W	03:26–03:29	3.26 mi (5.25 km)	300 yd (270 m)	Unknown
EF2	Several barns and outbuildings were destroyed, and many trees were downed.							
EF2	Roland	Orange	IN	38.5958°N 86.6819°W	03:39–03:40	1.04 mi (1.67 km)	200 yd (180 m)	Unknown
EF2	A house had windows blown in, a cabin lost shingles, a large barn lost its metal roof, and a wood outbuilding was destroyed. Many trees were downed as well.							
EF2	Celina	Mercer	OH	40.5496°N 84.5549°W	03:39–03:42	3.68 mi (5.92 km)	30 yd (27 m)	$340,000
EF2	Several houses and businesses were heavily damaged, while others sustained minor damage. Barns, garages, outbuildings, and vehicles were also destroyed. Numerous trees and power poles were downed along the path.							
EF1	Monticello to NNW of Spencerville	Van Wert, Allen	OH	40.6973°N 84.4255°W	03:40–03:44	4.03 mi (6.49 km)	100 yd (91 m)	Unknown
EF1	Several houses were damaged, sheds and barns were destroyed, and numerous trees were downed.							
EF1	S of French Lick (1st tornado)	Orange	IN	38.4403°N 86.6147°W	03:40–03:41	1.49 mi (2.40 km)	125 yd (114 m)	Unknown
EF1	A large metal barn was destroyed, and numerous trees were downed, with some falling on power poles. At a marina, three metal outbuildings were either damaged or destroyed: one had doors blown in, another had its roof peeled back, and the third was leveled and blown downwind. A pontoon boat was flipped as well.							
EF1	S of French Lick (2nd tornado)	Orange	IN	38.4689°N 86.6017°W	03:40–03:41	0.7 mi (1.1 km)	75 yd (69 m)	Unknown
EF1	A barn was destroyed, a porch was removed from a house, and trees were knocked down.							
EF0	N of St. Mary's	Auglaize	OH	40.5900°N 84.4556°W	03:44–03:48	3.77 mi (6.07 km)	67 yd (61 m)	$55,000
EF0	A small wooden barn was destroyed, houses sustained roof damage, a pontoon boat was flipped, and trees were downed.							
EF0	SSW of Paoli	Orange	IN	38.4997°N 86.5033°W	03:47–03:48	0.46 mi (0.74 km)	100 yd (91 m)	Unknown
EF0	Several trees were downed, and the roof was peeled off a small outbuilding.							
EF0	E of Stephensport to ESE of Payneville	Breckinridge, Meade	KY	37.9114°N 86.4269°W	03:54–04:04	11.46 mi (18.44 km)	150 yd (140 m)	Unknown
EF0	Intermittent tornado damaged several houses, including blowing an attached carport into a field and removing shingles. A barn door was blown in, and numerous trees were snapped or uprooted.							
EF1	N of Cairo	Allen	OH	40.8576°N 84.0820°W	03:58–03:59	0.71 mi (1.14 km)	100 yd (91 m)	Unknown
EF1	Significant damage occurred on a farm, with a house losing its roof and a barn being destroyed. An old school bus was damaged by debris from the barn, and numerous trees has the tops blown out near a railroad.							
EF1	NE of Livonia (1st tornado)	Washington	IN	38.5856°N 86.2558°W	03:59–04:01	1.54 mi (2.48 km)	200 yd (180 m)	Unknown
EF1	A grain bin, two silos, and a large outbuilding were destroyed, a house sustained severe damage, and another house had its roof partially removed and was pelted by driveway gravel. Several trees were downed as well.							
EF0	NE of Livonia (2nd tornado)	Washington	IN	38.5842°N 86.2358°W	04:00–04:01	1.23 mi (1.98 km)	75 yd (69 m)	Unknown
EF0	A grain silo and two barns were damaged, and several trees were downed.							
EF0	NNE of Salem	Washington	IN	38.6381°N 86.0828°W	04:07–04:08	0.65 mi (1.05 km)	50 yd (46 m)	Unknown
EF0	A house sustained roof damage, and two large outbuildings and a grain bin were destroyed.							
EF0	N of Corydon	Harrison	IN	38.2285°N 86.1266°W	04:09–04:10	0.28 mi (0.45 km)	50 yd (46 m)	Unknown
EF0	Numerous trees were either snapped or uprooted by this brief tornado.							
EF0	SW of Little York to NNE of Austin	Washington, Scott	IN	38.6492°N 85.9358°W	04:14–04:27	13.14 mi (21.15 km)	200 yd (180 m)	Unknown
EF0	Many trees were downed and a roof was damaged along an intermittent path.							
EF0	Scottsburg to E of Deputy	Scott, Jefferson	IN	38.6878°N 85.7708°W	04:19–04:31	11.8 mi (19.0 km)	100 yd (91 m)	Unknown
EF0	Numerous houses, several agricultural buildings, and a Holiday Inn hotel were damaged. Numerous trees were downed as well.							
EF0	N of Jeffersonville (1st tornado)	Clark	IN	38.3247°N 85.7303°W	04:28–04:29	0.17 mi (0.27 km)	75 yd (69 m)	Unknown
EF0	A very brief tornado damaged a shed and snapped a few trees.							
EF1	N of Jeffersonville (2nd tornado)	Clark	IN	38.3256°N 85.7328°W	04:28–04:29	1.18 mi (1.90 km)	200 yd (180 m)	Unknown
EF1	About 25 trailers were damaged in a mobile home park, some of which were removed from their foundations and had debris scattered long distances. Site-built homes sustained roof damage, sheds were either damaged or destroyed, a church's south side was blown out, and a trampoline was thrown into a tree. Numerous trees were downed or damaged as well.							
EF0	NE of Oregon	Lucas	OH	41.6800°N 83.4134°W	04:37–04:39	0.78 mi (1.26 km)	25 yd (23 m)	$200,000
EF0	One house was heavily damaged and about 24 others sustained minor damage, mostly to porches, roofs, and siding. A large camper and a small outbuilding were both destroyed, and a couple dozen trees were downed along the path.							
EF1	S of China	Jefferson	IN	38.7962°N 85.3560°W	04:40–04:42	2.34 mi (3.77 km)	125 yd (114 m)	Unknown
EF1	Several outbuildings were severely damaged or destroyed, with a piece of lumber from one being thrown through a house. A large barn was destroyed, other homes and outbuildings were damaged, and numerous trees were either snapped or uprooted.							
EF1	NE of Bryantsburg	Jefferson	IN	38.9062°N 85.3718°W	04:41–04:44	3.21 mi (5.17 km)	100 yd (91 m)	Unknown
EF1	A mobile home was destroyed, several barns sustained extensive roof damage, a cinder-block outbuilding had its roof removed, and a site-built house was damaged. A large garage had its door blown out, much of the roof was removed from a tobacco barn, and trees were downed.							
EF1	NW of La Grange	Oldham	KY	38.4125°N 85.4108°W	04:49–04:50	0.26 mi (0.42 km)	80 yd (73 m)	Unknown
EF1	A barn was destroyed, a house and another barn were damaged, and several trees were snapped.							
EF0	SW of Port Clinton	Ottawa	OH	41.4781°N 83.0453°W	04:55–04:57	1.53 mi (2.46 km)	30 yd (27 m)	$100,000
EF0	Two houses and several outbuildings sustained roof damage, and several trees were downed.							

=== April 20 event ===
List of confirmed tornadoes – Wednesday, April 20, 2011
EF#	Location	County / Parish	State	Start Coord.	Time (UTC)	Path length	Max width	Damage
EF1	NNE of Antioch	Switzerland	IN	38.8604°N 84.8842°W	05:04–05:06	1.76 mi (2.83 km)	67 yd (61 m)	$90,000
EF1	Two houses lost their roofs, and three barns were destroyed north of Warsaw, Kentucky.							
EF0	Frankfort area	Franklin	KY	38.1889°N 84.8967°W	05:28–05:33	4.81 mi (7.74 km)	30 yd (27 m)	$90,000
EF0	Trees were snapped along the track, and a few houses sustained minor damage, with the most concentrated damage in the area of the Kentucky State Capitol and the Frankfort Cemetery.							
EF1	NE of Georgetown	Scott	KY	38.2517°N 84.4504°W	05:54–05:55	0.51 mi (0.82 km)	50 yd (46 m)	$35,000
EF1	A tied-down trailer was overturned, several outbuildings were either heavily damaged or destroyed, a brick garage wall was buckled, and several trees were snapped.							
EF1	New Holland to SW of Williamsport	Pickaway	OH	39.5476°N 83.2539°W	06:14–06:19	4.22 mi (6.79 km)	200 yd (180 m)	$75,000
EF1	A brick building was damaged, a grain bin and three barns were destroyed, a trailer was overturned, and trees and tree limbs were knocked down.							
EF1	S of Groveport	Franklin	OH	39.8072°N 82.9183°W	06:22–06:25	2.54 mi (4.09 km)	100 yd (91 m)	$35,000
EF1	Two houses sustained significant roof damage, and a large wood frame storage shed with metal siding was destroyed. One power pole was snapped, several others were bent over, and many trees were downed.							
EF0	ENE of Groveport	Franklin	OH	39.8551°N 82.8505°W	06:26–06:27	0.12 mi (0.19 km)	50 yd (46 m)	$30,000
EF0	Twelve greenhouses sustained varying degrees of damage; the farthest west of the twelve was nearly destroyed. A metal door on an adjacent warehouse was bent, and a small metal shed was heavily damaged. Small trees in the greenhouses were pulled toward the center of the path, and plant transport carts pulled from a loading dock into a small pond.							
EF1	NW of Franklin	Simpson	KY	36.7364°N 86.6439°W	06:30–06:33	3.67 mi (5.91 km)	100 yd (91 m)	Unknown
EF1	A barn was destroyed, a second barn sustained roof damage, and at least 100 trees were snapped or uprooted.							
EF1	E of Baltimore to N of Thurston	Fairfield	OH	39.8506°N 82.5908°W	06:39–06:42	2.58 mi (4.15 km)	300 yd (270 m)	$45,000
EF1	A house and a barn were damaged, a garage was destroyed, and numerous large trees were snapped and uprooted.							
EF2	Heath	Licking	OH	40.0233°N 82.4741°W	06:42–06:45	3.85 mi (6.20 km)	100 yd (91 m)	$45,000
EF2	The tornado began just west of the Newark–Heath Airport and moved east-northeastward through Heath. Several houses and businesses were damaged, including a store that lost part of its front sign, a business that lost part of its metal roof, and a masonry building that was heavily damaged, with one wall completely collapsed and another partially collapsed. Numerous trees were snapped or uprooted along the path as well.							
EF1	ESE of Newark	Licking	OH	40.0485°N 82.2822°W	06:51–06:52	0.2 mi (0.32 km)	75 yd (69 m)	$40,000
EF1	A mobile home was overturned, with the roof and on side being removed and blown into trees. A house sustained roof damage, and several trees were snapped or uprooted.							
EF0	Piketon	Pike	OH	39.0601°N 83.014°W	06:51–06:52	0.2 mi (0.32 km)	50 yd (46 m)	$10,000
EF0	A brief tornado damaged a house, a mobile home, and several buildings at the Pike County fairgrounds. A shed was destroyed, and debris was strewn across the fairgrounds.							
EF0	Zahns Corners	Pike	OH	39.0640°N 82.9610°W	06:53–06:54	0.07 mi (0.11 km)	50 yd (46 m)	$70,000
EF0	Just east of Piketon, a second brief tornado damaged several houses and mobile homes (one mobile home was blown of its foundation), destroyed a storage shed, and twisted or knocked down large tree limbs.							
EF1	SSW of Moulton	Lawrence	AL	34.3271°N 87.3742°W	09:58–10:02	2.62 mi (4.22 km)	100 yd (91 m)	$0
EF1	The tornado moved through the William B. Bankhead National Forest on the east side of the Sipsey Wilderness. Many trees were downed along the path, which was embedded within a larger area of straight-line wind damage.							
EF0	WNW of Junction	Kimble	TX	30.4900°N 99.8600°W	23:37–23:40	0.1 mi (0.16 km)	50 yd (46 m)	$0
EF0	Brief tornado along Interstate 10 at mile 449 with no damage.							
EF1	SW of Tomnolen to WSW of Eupora	Webster	MS	33.4723°N 89.3745°W	01:09–01:15	3.29 mi (5.29 km)	150 yd (140 m)	$100,000
EF1	Many trees were uprooted, and several houses were damaged, some of them by fallen trees.							

=== April 21 event ===
List of confirmed tornadoes – Thursday, April 21, 2011
EF#	Location	County / Parish	State	Start Coord.	Time (UTC)	Path length	Max width	Damage
EF0	N of Longfellow	Pecos	TX	30.4725°N 102.6785°W	22:51–23:09	3.79 mi (6.10 km)	300 yd (270 m)	$0
EF0	A tornado was confirmed based on public reports, photographs, and radar data. No known damage occurred.							
EF0	SSE of Fort Stockton	Pecos	TX	30.570°N 102.677°W	23:18–23:23	8.09 mi (13.02 km)	200 yd (180 m)	$0
EF0	A tornado was confirmed based on public reports and photographs, near the area of the previous tornado. No known damage occurred.							
EF2	N of Sanderson	Terrell	TX	30.2045°N 102.4448°W	23:45–23:50	7.82 mi (12.59 km)	800 yd (730 m)	$100,000
EF2	A house and a barn were destroyed, and several cedar trees were snapped or uprooted.							
EF1	NW of Stith	Jones	TX	32.5697°N 99.9799°W	01:52–02:00	4.96 mi (7.98 km)	200 yd (180 m)	Unknown
EF1	Several houses sustained roof and window damage and barns, fences, and a porch were destroyed. A steel grain bin was rolled about 250 yards (230 m), a gooseneck trailer was thrown about 100 yards (91 m), numerous trees were downed, and a few farm animals were killed.							
EF0	WSW of Hawley	Jones	TX	32.58°N 99.91°W	01:55	0.1 mi (0.16 km)	100 yd (91 m)	$0
EF0	A rope tornado confirmed by spotters remained over open country with no damage.							

=== April 22 event ===
List of confirmed tornadoes – Friday, April 22, 2011
EF#	Location	County / Parish	State	Start Coord.	Time (UTC)	Path length	Max width	Damage
EF0	SW of Welty	Okfuskee	OK	35.6057°N 96.4385°W	23:03–23:04	0.5 mi (0.80 km)	150 yd (140 m)	$0
EF0	Large cone tornado with no damage.							
EF0	Eastern Versailles	Woodford	KY	38.04°N 84.72°W	23:07–23:08	0.75 mi (1.21 km)	60 yd (55 m)	Unknown
EF0	Roofs and fences sustained minor damage, and trees were downed on the east side of Versailles.							
EF0	E of Versailles	Woodford	KY	38.05°N 84.66°W	23:13	0.25 mi (0.40 km)	40 yd (37 m)	Unknown
EF0	Several trees were downed, and a few roofs were damaged.							
EF0	N of Kansas	Delaware	OK	36.2724°N 94.8000°W	23:16	0.1 mi (0.16 km)	50 yd (46 m)	$0
EF0	Brief tornado with no damage.							
EF0	SE of Cherokee City	Benton	AR	36.2877°N 94.5465°W	23:41	0.1 mi (0.16 km)	50 yd (46 m)	$0
EF0	Brief tornado over open country with no damage.							
EF0	NW of Highfill	Benton	AR	36.3019°N 94.3786°W	00:05	0.1 mi (0.16 km)	50 yd (46 m)	$0
EF0	Brief tornado near the Northwest Arkansas Regional Airport with no damage.							
EF1	WNW of New Melle to SW of Dardenne Prairie	St. Charles	MO	38.7362°N 90.9388°W	00:17–00:32	7.35 mi (11.83 km)	250 yd (230 m)	Unknown
EF1	One house lost half the roof, and its attached garage was destroyed. A nearby van was pushed approximately 30 yards (27 m) from a driveway into an open grassy area. Numerous other houses sustained mainly minor roof damage, a horse arena was demolished, and several barns and outbuildings were heavily damaged or destroyed. Many trees were downed along the path. This was the precursor to the St. Louis EF4 tornado.							
EF1	SE of Moodys	Cherokee	OK	36.0134°N 94.9320°W	00:18–00:19	1 mi (1.6 km)	200 yd (180 m)	$0
EF1	Several trees were uprooted.							
EF0	NW of Henryetta	Okmulgee	OK	35.4877°N 96.0814°W	00:19–00:20	0.5 mi (0.80 km)	100 yd (91 m)	$0
EF0	Brief tornado over open country with no damage.							
EF0	Bentonville	Benton	AR	36.3771°N 94.1991°W	00:21	0.1 mi (0.16 km)	50 yd (46 m)	$0
EF0	Brief tornado over open fields with no damage.							
EF0	SW of Byars	McClain	OK	34.8645°N 97.0663°W	00:45–00:48	0.5 mi (0.80 km)	150 yd (140 m)	$0
EF0	Storm chasers observed this tornado, which produced no damage.							
EF1	E of Byars	McClain	OK	34.8700°N 97.0324°W	00:59	0.2 mi (0.32 km)	30 yd (27 m)	$5,000
EF1	Trees and power lines were downed, and an outbuilding was damaged.							
EF4	NW of St. Louis to Northeastern Granite City, IL	St. Louis (MO), St. Louis (city), Madison (IL)	MO, IL	38.7364°N 90.4863°W	00:59–01:31	21.3 mi (34.3 km)	880 yd (800 m)	>$250,000,000
EF4	See article on this tornado – Five people were injured.							
EF0	NW of Stratford	Garvin	OK	34.8409°N 97.0099°W	01:02–01:05	0.4 mi (0.64 km)	50 yd (46 m)	$0
EF0	Storm chasers observed this tornado southeast of Byers, which produced no damage.							
EF1	E of Mill Spring	Wayne	MO	37.0674°N 90.5611°W	01:10–01:12	2.07 mi (3.33 km)	300 yd (270 m)	$100,000
EF1	A mobile home was destroyed by a falling tree, several outbuildings and a garage were destroyed, and hundreds of trees were uprooted. Some pine trees were snapped off 3 feet (0.91 m) above the ground.							
EF0	SE of Fame	McIntosh	OK	35.3549°N 95.6265°W	01:14	0.1 mi (0.16 km)	50 yd (46 m)	$0
EF0	This brief tornado occurred over Eufaula Lake. No damage was reported.							
EF2	SW of Highland to S of Greenville	Madison, Clinton, Bond	IL	38.7034°N 89.7144°W	01:55–02:30	18.19 mi (29.27 km)	700 yd (640 m)	Unknown
EF2	Several barns, sheds, and farm buildings were either damaged or destroyed, and several homes sustained roof and structural damage. A farm house lost its entire roof structure and had the front wall partially collapsed, a hog farm sustained extensive damage, and a few power poles were snapped. Many trees were snapped or uprooted, with one tree falling on a home and a second falling on a carport.							
EF2	Waterloo	Monroe	IL	38.3493°N 90.1548°W	01:50–01:55	3.52 mi (5.66 km)	90 yd (82 m)	Unknown
EF2	This tornado began on the north side of Waterloo and moved east of town. Several homes and businesses sustained varying degrees of roof and structural damage, two large air conditioners were thrown 30 yards (27 m) from the roof of a business, and a large garage was destroyed, with debris from a garage carried 30 to 40 yards (27 to 37 m) away. Four power poles were snapped, and numerous trees, some large, were snapped or uprooted. A minor injury occurred at Canterbury Manor Nursing Center due to flying glass from a broken window.							
EF1	Paderborn	St. Clair	IL	38.3599°N 90.0468°W	02:02–02:06	1.75 mi (2.82 km)	80 yd (73 m)	Unknown
EF1	Six homes sustained roof damage, two power poles were snapped, and numerous trees were snapped or uprooted.							
EF2	NE of Sturgis to SSW of Robards	Union, Webster, Henderson	KY	37.5892°N 87.8407°W	03:50–04:05	15.51 mi (24.96 km)	300 yd (270 m)	$880,000
EF2	Several barns and grain bins were destroyed in Union County. The tornado then moved through Webster County, where several houses were damaged in Poole. Three houses lost their roofs completely, while other homes sustained shingle loss or were damaged by falling trees. Several garages were damaged or destroyed, along with more barns and grain bins, with two grain bins wrapped around the back side of a house. Another barn and garage were destroyed southwest of Robards in Henderson County. Many trees were snapped or uprooted along the path. Two people sustained minor injuries.							
EF0	Stanley	Daviess	KY	37.82°N 87.24°W	04:27–04:28	0.2 mi (0.32 km)	40 yd (37 m)	$3,000
EF0	A brief, weak tornado was witnessed by law enforcement near Stanley. Power lines were downed.							

== See also ==
- Weather of 2011
- List of North American tornadoes and tornado outbreaks
- List of F4, EF4, and IF4 tornadoes
  - List of F4 and EF4 tornadoes (2010–2019)
