= Tornado outbreak and derecho of April 4–5, 2011 =

Windstorm and tornado outbreak in the southern and eastern United States

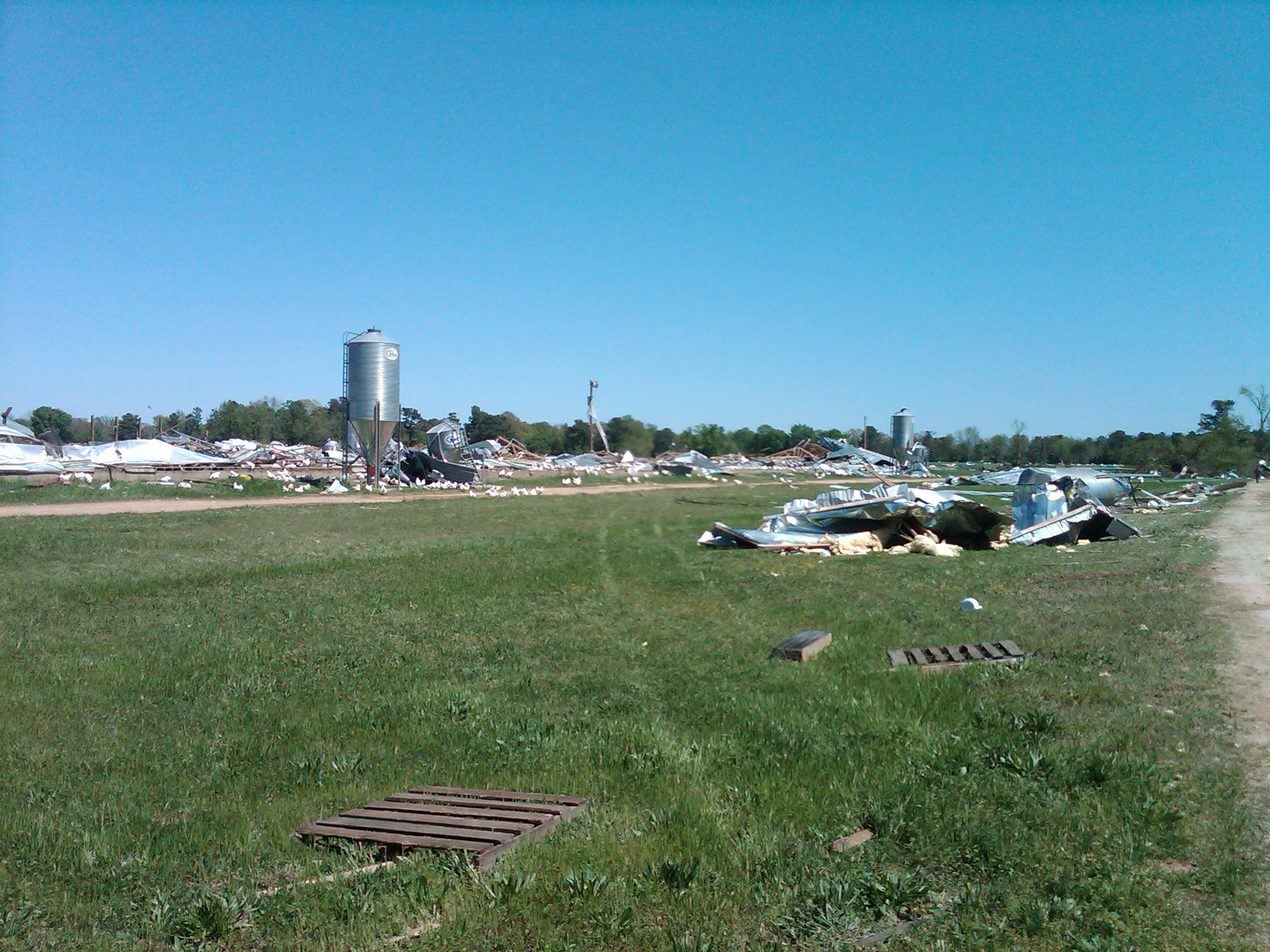
- Four chicken houses that were destroyed by an EF2 tornado east of Blevins, Arkansas.

Meteorological history
- Formed: April 4, 2011
- Dissipated: April 5, 2011
- Duration: 19 hours, 47 minutes

Tornado outbreak
- Tornadoes: 46
- Max. rating: EF2 tornado

Overall effects
- Fatalities: 1 tornadic (+8 non-tornadic)
- Injuries: 13
- Damage: $15 million (2011 USD)
- Economic losses: $2.8 billion (2011 USD)
- Areas affected: Southern and Eastern United States
- Power outages: 247,000

From April 4–5, 2011, a large-scale damaging wind event and tornado outbreak affected the Southern and Eastern parts of the United States. The system produced a large serial derecho windstorm that caused thousands of reports of wind damage and several embedded tornadoes. Power outages were extensive across the area and tree damage was severe. Several people were killed and injured by falling trees and branches as the storm passed through. Damaging tornadoes touched down in Arkansas, Kentucky, and Mississippi. The storm continued into the early hours of the morning causing more wind damage along the East Coast along with a few more tornadoes. It is reportedly one of the most prolific damaging wind events on record. The outbreak was the first in a series of devastating tornado outbreaks in the month of April 2011, which would culminate near the end of the month with the largest tornado outbreak ever recorded.

== Meteorological synopsis ==
Several storms started to develop in the evening on April 3. Storms in Kansas, Missouri, Iowa, and Illinois brought severe thunderstorms to the areas. A tornado watch was issued for Iowa and Illinois as the storms rolled through, and later a severe thunderstorm watch for northeastern Illinois and southeastern Wisconsin. However, there were no reported tornadoes. Continuing eastward, the system entered an environment favoring tornadic development. Two tornadoes were reported in Kentucky during the early afternoon, both rated EF2 and resulting in injuries. Near Hopkinsville, a tornado, confirmed by local emergency services, caused significant damage to a manufacturing plant and injured several people. Numerous buildings were reported to be destroyed, trapping residents within debris. Other tornadoes caused damage and injuries in the southern states including Louisiana and Mississippi. In addition to the tornadoes, there was widespread wind damage (over 1,400 severe weather reports were received by the Storm Prediction Center, with the vast majority being damaging winds) as an extremely large squall line/serial derecho, which had begun to form over northern Texas at around 4 am Monday morning, tracked across the southern United States with wind gusts as high as 90 mph (140 km/h) reported across 20 states. Severe wind damage and power outages also occurred in Arkansas, in addition to a few tornadoes. Nine people were killed in this storm, one of the deaths was as a result of an EF2 tornado in Dodge County, Georgia that destroyed mobile homes. The other fatalities were caused by straight line winds. The squall line continued into the early hours of the morning and caused more severe wind damage and some tornadoes along the East Coast, especially in Georgia and the Carolinas. Numerous power outages also took place due to the extensive wind damage. Nearly 100,000 and 147,000 residences lost power in Tennessee and Georgia respectively.

== Confirmed tornadoes ==
Confirmed tornadoes by Enhanced Fujita rating
EFU	EF0	EF1	EF2	EF3	EF4	EF5	Total
0	9	31	6	0	0	0	46

=== April 4 event ===
List of confirmed tornadoes – Monday, April 4, 2011 (Note: All dates are based on the local time zone where the tornado touched down; however, all times are in Coordinated Universal Time and dates are split at midnight CDT for consistency.)
EF#	Location	County / Parish	State	Start Coord.	Time (UTC)	Path length	Max width	Damage (Note: All damage totals are in 2011 USD unless otherwise stated.)
EF1	E of Ashdown	Little River	AR	33.675°N 94.096°W	13:10–13:15	4.84 mi (7.79 km)	150 yd (140 m)	$25,000
EF1	A metal building with a steel beam frame was completely destroyed, a carport was collapsed, and many trees were snapped or uprooted.							
EF1	NNE of Hope	Hempstead	AR	33.701°N 93.586°W	13:38–13:41	3.89 mi (6.26 km)	100 yd (91 m)	$300,000
EF1	A tractor trailer was flipped over, roofing was pulled from a barn and nine chicken houses, and several trees were snapped or uprooted.							
EF2	E of Blevins	Hempstead, Nevada	AR	33.865°N 93.521°W	13:40–13:42	1.84 mi (2.96 km)	200 yd (180 m)	$500,000
EF2	Numerous trees were snapped, a small trailer was tossed 20 yards (18 m), and four chicken houses were destroyed, killing hundreds of chickens. Two people were injured.							
EF1	S of Fouke	Miller	AR	33.195°N 93.889°W	13:50–13:54	2.63 mi (4.23 km)	150 yd (140 m)	$100,000
EF1	Many trees were snapped or uprooted, of which one fell on a home, puncturing the roof. A large storage building was destroyed, and a second home sustained minor damage.							
EF1	Whelen Springs	Clark	AR	33.830°N 93.130°W	14:08–14:14	3.96 mi (6.37 km)	200 yd (180 m)	$50,000
EF1	The tornado began on the west side of Whelen Springs and traveled to about three miles (4.8 km) west of town. Shingles and siding were blown off a house, and its television antenna was blown over. Numerous trees were blown down, one of which landed on a tractor shed at the residence. A canning shed was destroyed, with bottles and jars being scattered, farm gates were destroyed, and a few power poles and power lines were downed.							
EF1	N of Box Springs	Columbia	AR	33.281°N 93.383°W	14:28–14:29	0.89 mi (1.43 km)	75 yd (69 m)	$75,000
EF1	A few small barns, several homes, and a garage sustained minor damage, and several trees were snapped or uprooted.							
EF1	SE of Norphlet	Union	AR	33.318°N 92.665°W	15:12–15:13	1.28 mi (2.06 km)	100 yd (91 m)	$150,000
EF1	An old gas station cover was blown down, several homes sustained minor roof damage, a carport was collapsed on a vehicle, and several trees were snapped or uprooted. A small metal outbuilding sustained structural damage.							
EF1	Slater	Ballard	KY	36.9944°N 89.0120°W	15:18–15:22	3.72 mi (5.99 km)	200 yd (180 m)	$40,000
EF1	The tornado moved from southwest of Slater to east of the community. Two barns were leveled, and numerous trees were snapped or uprooted.							
EF2	Slater to SSE of Kevil	Ballard	KY	37.0200°N 88.9800°W	15:20–15:27	6.42 mi (10.33 km)	300 yd (270 m)	$700,000
EF2	A farm building was destroyed, the second story of a house was removed, and a garage was leveled. Several additional homes sustained roof damage, two mobile homes were overturned, and four chicken barns were either destroyed or heavily damaged. Numerous farm buildings and grain bins were destroyed, and numerous trees were snapped or uprooted. A mobile home was shifted slightly off its foundation. One person was injured.							
EF0	N of Heath	McCracken	KY	37.0889°N 88.8091°W	15:30–15:31	0.51 mi (0.82 km)	50 yd (46 m)	$30,000
EF0	The roof of a metal farm building was lifted, with two parked vehicles in the structure heavily damaged, and large tree limbs were downed.							
EF1	S of Greenville to Cleaton	Muhlenberg	KY	37.1855°N 87.1800°W	16:55–17:02	7.08 mi (11.39 km)	150 yd (140 m)	$100,000
EF1	One mobile home was overturned and destroyed, another was shifted off its foundation, a camper trailer was overturned, and several houses sustained shingle damage. Several trees were blown down.							
EF2	ESE of Hopkinsville	Christian	KY	36.7835°N 87.3969°W	17:04–17:10	5.26 mi (8.47 km)	200 yd (180 m)	$2,000,000
EF2	An industrial warehouse building along US 41 was heavily damaged, with large sections of roofing removed, small sections of exterior walls blown in, and a rooftop HVAC unit blown away. Elsewhere, steel utility poles were bent almost to the ground, several barns were destroyed, and two homes lost their metal roofs. Dozens of trees were uprooted along the path, which passed just north of Pembroke. Seven people were injured inside the warehouse.							
EF1	N of Sugar Grove	Butler	KY	37.0944°N 86.6947°W	17:26–17:29	3.38 mi (5.44 km)	50 yd (46 m)	Unknown
EF1	A section of a residence's roof was removed, trees were snapped, and a mobile home was moved off its foundation.							
EF1	SSW of Caneyville	Grayson	KY	37.3831°N 86.5611°W	17:38–17:42	3.41 mi (5.49 km)	125 yd (114 m)	Unknown
EF1	A number of trees were snapped or uprooted. Metal roofing was blown off a barn and a residence, one small but well-constructed shed was pushed onto its side, and another small shed was destroyed.							
EF1	Caneyville	Grayson	KY	37.4258°N 86.4894°W	17:41–17:43	1.01 mi (1.63 km)	200 yd (180 m)	Unknown
EF1	A tree was blown onto a restaurant, the metal roof was blown off a cinder block dugout on a baseball field and a mobile home, and three large grain bins were moved off their foundations. A tractor trailer was blown over, and several trees were snapped or uprooted.							
EF1	Waverly	Humphreys	TN	36.0841°N 87.8069°W	18:19–18:22	2.9 mi (4.7 km)	75 yd (69 m)	$155,000
EF1	Several businesses sustained significant roof damage, signs and overhangs were torn off, and dozens of trees were snapped or uprooted, several of which fell on homes and vehicles.							
EF1	Tennessee City to Dickson	Dickson	TN	36.0952°N 87.5390°W	18:33–18:41	7.25 mi (11.67 km)	150 yd (140 m)	$122,000
EF1	Hundreds of trees were snapped or uprooted, several structures sustained significant roof damage, and several outbuildings and barns were heavily damaged.							
EF0	S of Ashland City	Cheatham	TN	36.2514°N 87.0721°W	18:52–18:53	0.81 mi (1.30 km)	50 yd (46 m)	$7,000
EF0	Dozens of trees were snapped or uprooted, and additional damage was observed in an inaccessible area east of the Cumberland River.							
EF1	W of Smyrna	Williamson, Davidson, Rutherford	TN	35.9774°N 86.6570°W	19:20–19:24	4.9 mi (7.9 km)	100 yd (91 m)	$254,000
EF1	The tornado began just inside the Williamson County line near Nolensville and moved east toward Smyrna. Numerous power poles were snapped, hundreds of trees were snapped or uprooted, some small storage buildings were destroyed, numerous homes sustained roof and siding damage, and several fences were blown down. A tractor trailer and several cargo trailers were overturned.							
EF1	SW of Georgetown to SE of Tullos	Grant, LaSalle	LA	31.7200°N 92.4100°W	19:42–19:52	9.29 mi (14.95 km)	275 yd (251 m)	$250,000
EF1	Numerous trees were snapped or uprooted, some of which fell on homes and a vehicle. Shingles were pulled from one house, and a tin roof was ripped from a shop.							
EF1	E of Tompkinsville	Monroe	KY	36.7086°N 85.6086°W	19:55–19:56	0.19 mi (0.31 km)	75 yd (69 m)	Unknown
EF1	A large barn was destroyed, with debris thrown 400 yards (370 m) in several directions, and multiple trees were snapped or uprooted.							
EF2	NE of Summerville to SW of Enterprise	LaSalle, Catahoula	LA	31.8000°N 92.1300°W	19:58–20:09	12.57 mi (20.23 km)	440 yd (400 m)	$310,000
EF2	Numerous trees were snapped or uprooted, a hunting camp was heavily damaged, a mobile home was tossed down a ravine and destroyed, and a covered travel trailer was blown on to its side.							
EF1	SW of Albany	Clinton	KY	36.6492°N 85.1800°W	20:14–20:15	0.25 mi (0.40 km)	150 yd (140 m)	Unknown
EF1	The roof of a large boat storage barn was lifted and thrown, and a second storage shed was destroyed. A house had a window blown out.							
EF0	NNW of Seventy Six	Clinton	KY	36.7974°N 85.1404°W	20:16–20:17	0.22 mi (0.35 km)	60 yd (55 m)	Unknown
EF0	Multiple trees were snapped and uprooted.							
EF2	SSE of Cooter Point, LA to NNW of Grand Gulf, MS	Tensas (LA), Claiborne (MS)	LA, MS	31.9099°N 91.5102°W	20:43–21:14	28.01 mi (45.08 km)	880 yd (800 m)	$4,002,000
EF2	The tornado began in Tensas Parish, Louisiana before dissipating in Claiborne County, Mississippi. Numerous homes, farms, and outbuildings sustained significant damage, a water treatment plant and antebellum home were majorly damaged, a grain silo received a huge dent, and an 18-wheeler was flipped over. Hundreds of trees were snapped and uprooted, and numerous power poles were snapped. One person was injured.							
EF0	WNW of Hebron	Licking	OH	39.981°N 82.571°W	20:46–20:47	0.9 mi (1.4 km)	50 yd (46 m)	$60,000
EF0	A large garage had a portion of its roof peeled off, a supporting post was snapped, one side of the building was blown inward, and metal doors on the opposite side were blown outward. A smaller garage sustained major damage to a metal door. A large section of metal and wood roofing was removed from a barn, a door was removed from a smaller storage shed, and a house sustained minor damage. A few trees were uprooted.							
EF1	NW of Williamsburg	Whitley	KY	36.8251°N 84.2241°W	21:03–21:06	1.74 mi (2.80 km)	880 yd (800 m)	$200,000
EF1	Many trees were downed or uprooted, and several barns and outbuildings sustained significant damage.							
EF1	NE of Utica	Hinds	MS	32.1284°N 90.6278°W	21:42–21:45	4.02 mi (6.47 km)	440 yd (400 m)	$120,000
EF1	A number of trees were snapped or uprooted, and two outbuildings were destroyed.							
EF1	E of Beaver	Floyd	KY	37.390°N 82.640°W	22:21–22:26	0.4 mi (0.64 km)	100 yd (91 m)	$10,000
EF1	A trailer home was destroyed, and approximately 100 trees were downed.							
EF0	NE of Athens	McMinn	TN	35.460°N 84.590°W	22:36–22:40	0.1 mi (0.16 km)	25 yd (23 m)	$10,000
EF0	Eight trees were downed.							
EF1	NNE of Harrisville to ENE of Braxton	Simpson	MS	32.0102°N 90.0455°W	22:36–22:42	7.38 mi (11.88 km)	1,320 yd (1,210 m)	$550,000
EF1	Many trees were snapped or uprooted, some of which fell on homes and vehicles. Many power lines were downed as well.							
EF1	W of Ruth to ESE of Topeka	Lincoln, Lawrence	MS	31.3800°N 90.3554°W	22:48–23:07	17.28 mi (27.81 km)	600 yd (550 m)	$1,500,000
EF1	A gas station awning was destroyed, the back wall was blown out of a volunteer fire department building, a church had its steeple blown off and sustained extensive shingle damage, and numerous homes sustained various degrees of roof damage. Several trees were snapped or uprooted, some of which fell on vehicles and houses.							
EF1	E of Franklinton	Washington	LA	30.8500°N 90.1400°W	23:40	0.2 mi (0.32 km)	75 yd (69 m)	$30,000
EF1	A home lost a large portion of its roof, two mobile homes also sustained roof damage, and several large trees were uprooted.							
EF1	S of Killian	Livingston	LA	30.3246°N 90.5735°W	23:42	0.5 mi (0.80 km)	50 yd (46 m)	$10,000
EF1	Several trees were snapped or uprooted, and a metal roof was peeled off a home.							
EF0	Gramercy	St. James	LA	30.0614°N 90.6990°W	23:50–23:52	0.94 mi (1.51 km)	50 yd (46 m)	$50,000
EF0	A carport was lifted off a home, causing significant damage, and other buildings sustained minor to moderate roof damage. Significant tree damage was observed.							
EF1	SW of Bogalusa	Washington	LA	30.6677°N 89.9690°W	00:01	0.2 mi (0.32 km)	75 yd (69 m)	$50,000
EF1	A trailer was lifted and thrown into a camper. Sheet metal, tin roofing, and an awning were tossed and wrapped around a tree. Numerous trees were snapped or uprooted.							
EF1	SSE of Poplarville	Pearl River	MS	30.6695°N 89.4527°W	00:43	0.25 mi (0.40 km)	50 yd (46 m)	$30,000
EF1	Multiple trees were snapped or uprooted, and a portion of a metal roof was peeled off a home, breaking a few roof beams.							
EF1	NW of Neely to SSW of State Line	Greene	MS	31.2665°N 88.8278°W	00:43–01:03	19.42 mi (31.25 km)	100 yd (91 m)	$500,000
EF1	Thousands of trees were snapped or uprooted, some of which fell on the roofs of several homes and a church, and a metal barn was destroyed.							
EF1	E of Ocean Springs	Jackson	MS	30.4022°N 88.7198°W	01:45	0.1 mi (0.16 km)	75 yd (69 m)	$35,000
EF1	Roofing was removed from a few commercial buildings, windows were blown out of two houses, large sections of two fences were blown down, large tree limbs were snapped, and several trees were blown down.							
EF1	NE of Carters Lake	Gilmer	GA	34.6380°N 84.5923°W	01:33–01:36	2.64 mi (4.25 km)	880 yd (800 m)	$1,000,000
EF1	Hundreds of trees were snapped or uprooted, inflicting various degrees of damage to approximately 100 homes.							
EF0	WNW of Ellijay	Gilmer	GA	34.7206°N 84.6039°W	01:34–01:36	1.83 mi (2.95 km)	880 yd (800 m)	$500,000
EF0	Several hundred trees were snapped or uprooted, six chicken houses were heavily damaged or destroyed, a horse stable was destroyed, and three outbuildings were heavily damaged.							

=== April 5 event ===
List of confirmed tornadoes – Tuesday, April 5, 2011
EF#	Location	County / Parish	State	Start Coord.	Time (UTC)	Path length	Max width	Damage
EF1	Ararat	Surry	NC	36.3951°N 80.5721°W	05:25–05:28	2.68 mi (4.31 km)	250 yd (230 m)	$1,000,000
EF1	About 35 to 40 homes sustained roof or shingle damage, carports collapsed on vehicles, and the windows were blown out at a community building. Numerous trees were felled, some of which landed on houses and barns.							
EF1	WNW of Walden	Bibb	GA	32.7119°N 83.7127°W	05:30–05:32	1.11 mi (1.79 km)	50 yd (46 m)	$300,000
EF1	Approximately 100 trees were blown down, snapped, or uprooted, inflicting minor to moderate damage to nine homes. The garage was blown out of one of the houses, shifting the home off its foundation and causing significant damage.							
EF2	NW of Eastman	Dodge	GA	32.2846°N 83.3234°W	06:39–06:42	3.13 mi (5.04 km)	50 yd (46 m)	$150,000
EF2	1 death – A double-wide mobile home was completely destroyed, killing one of the occupants. Several trees were blown down or uprooted, and the roof and front porch of a second mobile home were destroyed. Two people were injured.							
EF0	WNW of Mattawoman	Charles	MD	38.6521°N 76.8901°W	08:48–08:49	0.09 mi (0.14 km)	50 yd (46 m)	$5,000
EF0	A large tree was downed onto a house roof, and several others were snapped. A fence was damaged, and several outdoor objects were blown around.							
EF0	E of Collington	Prince George's, Anne Arundel	MD	38.9680°N 76.7160°W	08:55–08:57	1.34 mi (2.16 km)	50 yd (46 m)	$4,000
EF0	Numerous trees were topped or blown down.							
