= Tomnolen, Mississippi =

- Unincorporated community
- Location within Mississippi Location within the United States
- Coordinates: 33°29′05″N 89°21′28″W
- Country: United States
- State: Mississippi
- County: Webster
- Elevation: 358 ft (109 m)
- Time zone: UTC-6 (Central (CST))
  - Summer (DST): UTC-5 (CDT)
- ZIP code: 39744
- Area code: 662
- GNIS feature ID: 678812

Tomnolen is an unincorporated community located in Webster County, Mississippi, United States, along U.S. Route 82. Tomnolen is approximately 6 miles (9.7 km) east of Stewart.
