= Randles, Missouri =

Unincorporated community in Missouri, U.S.

Coordinates: 37°08′16″N 89°46′03″W

Randles is an unincorporated community in Cape Girardeau County, in the U.S. state of Missouri.

== History ==
A post office called Randles was established in 1891, and remained in operation until 1957. The community has the name of the local Randles family.
