= Monticello, Ohio =

Unincorporated community in Ohio, U.S.

Monticello
- Location of Monticello within Ohio Monticello (the United States)
- Coordinates: 40°41′51″N 84°25′32″W
- Country: United States
- State: Ohio
- County: Van Wert

Monticello is an unincorporated community in Van Wert County, in the U.S. state of Ohio.

== History ==
Monticello had its start when the railroad was extended to that point. The community has the name of Monticello, the Virginia estate of Thomas Jefferson. A post office was established at Monticello in 1879, and remained in operation until 1909.
