= Fame, Oklahoma =

- Unincorporated community
- Location within Oklahoma Location within the United States
- Coordinates: 35°21′44″N 95°38′45″W
- Country: United States
- State: Oklahoma
- County: McIntosh
- Elevation: 604 ft (184 m)
- Time zone: UTC-6 (Central (CST))
  - Summer (DST): UTC-5 (CDT)
- Area codes: 918 & 539
- GNIS feature ID: 11100405

Fame is an unincorporated community in McIntosh County, Oklahoma, United States. The community is located on the western shore of Lake Eufaula, 3 miles (4.8 km) east of Stidham.
