= Zahns Corners, Ohio =

Unincorporated community in Ohio, U.S.

Coordinates: 39°03′38″N 82°57′45″W

Zahns Corners is an unincorporated community in Pike County, in the U.S. state of Ohio.

Scioto Valley Local School District operated Zahn's Corner Middle School in the community. The school was shut down in May 2019 after high levels of radioactive isotopes were detected in soil and air samples, as the school was situated near an abandoned nuclear plant.
