= Slater, Kentucky =

Unincorporated community in Kentucky, United States

Slater
- Unincorporated community
- Location within the state of Kentucky Slater (the United States)
- Coordinates: 37°0′41″N 88°59′21″W
- Country: United States
- State: Kentucky
- County: Ballard
- Elevation: 463 ft (141 m)
- Time zone: UTC-6 (Central (CST))
  - Summer (DST): UTC-5 (CST)
- GNIS feature ID: 509075

Slater is an unincorporated community located in Ballard County, Kentucky, United States.
