= Paderborn, Illinois =

- Census-designated place
- Location within Illinois
- Coordinates: 38°21′37″N 90°02′33″W
- Country: United States
- State: Illinois
- County: St. Clair

Area
  - Total: 0.15 sq mi (0.40 km^{2})
  - Land: 0.15 sq mi (0.39 km^{2})
  - Water: 0.0039 sq mi (0.01 km^{2})
- Elevation: 492 ft (150 m)

Population (2020)
  - Total: 35
  - Density: 233.2/sq mi (90.05/km^{2})
- Time zone: UTC-6 (Central (CST))
  - Summer (DST): UTC-5 (CDT)
- Area code: 618
- GNIS feature ID: 2583441

Paderborn is a census-designated place in St. Clair County, Illinois, United States. As of the 2020 census, Paderborn had a population of 35.

== Demographics ==
Historical population
| Census | Pop. | Note | %± |
|---|---|---|---|
| 2010 | 43 | | — |
| 2020 | 35 | | −18.6% |
U.S. Decennial Census

Paderborn CDP, Illinois – Racial and ethnic composition Note: the US Census treats Hispanic/Latino as an ethnic category. This table excludes Latinos from the racial categories and assigns them to a separate category. Hispanics/Latinos may be of any race.
| Race / Ethnicity (NH = Non-Hispanic) | Pop 2010 | Pop 2020 | % 2010 | % 2020 |
|---|---|---|---|---|
| White alone (NH) | 43 | 30 | 100.00% | 85.71% |
| Black or African American alone (NH) | 0 | 0 | 0.00% | 0.00% |
| Native American or Alaska Native alone (NH) | 0 | 0 | 0.00% | 0.00% |
| Asian alone (NH) | 0 | 0 | 0.00% | 0.00% |
| Native Hawaiian or Pacific Islander alone (NH) | 0 | 0 | 0.00% | 0.00% |
| Other race alone (NH) | 0 | 0 | 0.00% | 0.00% |
| Mixed race or Multiracial (NH) | 0 | 4 | 0.00% | 11.43% |
| Hispanic or Latino (any race) | 0 | 1 | 0.00% | 2.86% |
| Total | 43 | 35 | 100.00% | 100.00% |
