= Honey Bend, Illinois =

- Unincorporated community
- Location within Illinois Location within the United States
- Coordinates: 39°15′19″N 89°37′22″W
- Country: United States
- State: Illinois
- County: Montgomery
- Elevation: 656 ft (200 m)
- Time zone: UTC-6 (Central (CST))
  - Summer (DST): UTC-5 (CDT)
- Area code: 217
- GNIS feature ID: 422819

Honey Bend is an unincorporated community in North Litchfield Township, Montgomery County, Illinois, United States. Honey Bend is located on County Route 26 and the Norfolk and Southern Railroad, 5.8 miles (9.3 km) north-northeast of Litchfield.
