= Tennessee City, Tennessee =

- Unincorporated community
- Location within Tennessee Location within the United States
- Coordinates: 36°05′35″N 87°30′53″W
- Country: United States
- State: Tennessee
- County: Dickson
- Elevation: 823 ft (251 m)
- Time zone: UTC-6 (Central (CST))
  - Summer (DST): UTC-5 (CDT)
- Area code: 615
- GNIS feature ID: 1304043

Tennessee City (also Gillem, Gillems Station) is an unincorporated community in Dickson County, Tennessee, United States.
