= Seventy Six, Kentucky =

Unincorporated community in Kentucky, United States

- Unincorporated community
- Location within Kentucky
- Coordinates: 36°47′11″N 85°08′38″W
- Country: United States
- State: Kentucky
- County: Clinton
- Elevation: 958 ft (292 m)
- Time zone: UTC-6 (Central (CST))
  - Summer (DST): UTC-5 (CDT)
- Area code: 606
- GNIS feature ID: 509034

Seventy Six is an unincorporated community in Clinton County, Kentucky, United States. Its post office has been closed.

== History ==
The origin of the community's name is uncertain. Some local historians say it may have come from a station number in the original land survey for the town, or it could have been named for the year of the Declaration of Independence. Some sources say the community was named for the height of nearby Seventy Six Falls, but the waterfall on Indian Creek was 84 feet high, not 76, before the impoundment of Lake Cumberland.

== Geography ==
Seventy Six is 6.9 miles north of Albany. It is located at the junction of Kentucky Routes 734 and 1266.

== See also ==
- List of places with numeric names
