= Beaver, Kentucky =

Unincorporated community in Kentucky, United States

- Unincorporated community
- Location within the state of Kentucky Beaver (the United States)
- Coordinates: 37°23′48″N 82°39′16″W
- Country: United States
- State: Kentucky
- County: Floyd
- Elevation: 971 ft (296 m)
- Time zone: UTC-5 (Eastern (EST))
  - Summer (DST): UTC-4 (EST)
- ZIP codes: 41604
- GNIS feature ID: 486604

Beaver is an unincorporated community in Floyd County, Kentucky, United States.

== History ==
On April 4, 2011, an EF1 tornado landed east of Beaver. A trailer home was destroyed, and approximately 100 trees were downed, causing $10,000 in damage.
