= Reddington =

Reddington may refer to:

== People ==
- Daryll Reddington (born 1972), former New Zealand cricketer
- Karen Reddington-Hughes, American politician from Connecticut
- Ian Reddington (born 1957), English actor
- Helen Reddington (born late 1950s), British academic, writer, musician and singer-songwriter
- Tony Reddin (1919–2015), Irish former sportsperson born Martin Charles Reddington
- Stuart Reddington (born 1978), English former professional footballer who played as a defender

=== Given name ===
- William Redington Hewlett (1913–2001), American co-founder of the Hewlett-Packard Company

=== Fictional ===
- Raymond Reddington, the main character of 2013 TV series The Blacklist, played by James Spader.

== Places ==
- Reddington, Indiana, an unincorporated town in Redding Township

== See also ==
- Redding (disambiguation)
- Redding (surname)
- Redington (disambiguation)
- Reding (disambiguation)
- Reddin
- Redden (disambiguation)
- Reading (disambiguation)
