= Redding (surname) =

- Language: English

Origin
- Region of origin: England

Other names
- Variant forms: Reding; Reddington; Redington; Reddin; Redden; Reading

Redding is an English surname, derived from the town of Reading. At the time the 1881 British Census was enumerated, the frequency of the surname Redding was highest in Buckinghamshire (12.8 times the national average), followed by Huntingdonshire, Worcestershire, Herefordshire, Cambridgeshire, Warwickshire, Anglesey, Bedfordshire and Rutland.

== List of persons with the surname ==
- Ann Holmes Redding (born 1952), former Episcopal priest who was defrocked in 2009 for converting to Islam years earlier
- Benjamin B. Redding (1824–1882), Canadian-born California politician
- Cory Redding (born 1980), American football player
- Cyrus Redding (1785–1870), British journalist and wine writer
- Devine Redding (born 1996), American football player
- Dick Redding (1890–1948), American baseball player
- Gene Redding (born 1945), American singer
- George Redding (1900–1974), Canadian ice hockey player
- Jheri Redding (1907–1998), American hair care entrepreneur
- J. Saunders Redding (1906–1988), American writer and educator
- Louis L. Redding (1901–1998), American civil rights advocate
- Noel Redding (1945–2003), English musician
- Oscar Redding (born c. 1974), Australian actor and director
- Otis Redding (1941–1967), American soul singer
- Phil Redding (1890–1928), American baseball player
- Reggie Redding (born 1988), American basketball player
- Reggie Redding (American football) (born 1968), American football player
- Rob Redding (born 1976), American commentator
- Scott Redding (born 1993), English Grand Prix motorcycle racer
- Teo Redding (born 1994), American football player
- Tim Redding (born 1978), American baseball player

== Fictional characters ==
- Ellis Boyd "Red" Redding, character in The Shawshank Redemption
- Burr Redding, inmate on TV's Oz
- William Redding, character in the Splinter Cell series of video games and novels
- Blake Redding played by Logan Paul in a 2016 YouTube Originals movie The Thinning

== See also ==
- Redding (disambiguation)
- Charles Redding Pitt (born 1944), American attorney and former chairman of the Alabama Democratic Party
- Francis Redding Tillou Nicholls (1834–1912), American attorney, politician, judge and brigadier general in the Confederate States Army
- Sidney Redding Mason (1925–2009), American businessman and politician
- The Reddings, funk, soul and disco band, with Dexter Redding and Otis Redding III, both sons of Otis Redding
- The Redding Brothers, indie rock trio, comprising Gabriel, Josiah and Micah Redding
