= List of United States tornadoes from January to March 2011 =

This is a list of all tornadoes that were confirmed by local offices of the National Weather Service in the United States from January to March 2011. Based on the 1991–2010 average, 35 tornadoes touch down in January, 29 touch down in February and 80 touch down in March. These tornadoes are commonly focused across the Southern United States due to their proximity to the unstable airmass and warm waters of the Gulf of Mexico, as well as California in association with winter storms.

A tornado outbreak that began at the end of December 2010 extended into January 1 and multiple strong tornadoes touched down that day. However, the rest of the month was generally quiet, and the month finished below average with only 16 tornadoes. Tornado activity in the first three weeks of February were also quiet, but two large outbreaks at the end of the month pushed it well above average with 68 tornadoes confirmed. There were no large outbreaks in March, but steady activity throughout the month led to a total 75 tornadoes, which was close to average.

== United States yearly total ==
Confirmed tornadoes by Enhanced Fujita rating
EFU	EF0	EF1	EF2	EF3	EF4	EF5	Total
0	802	629	199	62	17	6	1,721

== January ==
Confirmed tornadoes by Enhanced Fujita rating
EFU	EF0	EF1	EF2	EF3	EF4	EF5	Total
0	8	5	1	2	0	0	16

=== January 1 event ===
List of confirmed tornadoes – Saturday, January 1, 2011
EF#	Location	County / Parish	State	Start Coord.	Time (UTC)	Path length	Max width
EF3	SE of Durant to N of Ethel	Attala	MS	33.0394°N 89.8123°W	06:02–06:26	23.45 mi (37.74 km)	1,300 yd (1,200 m)
EF3	Thousands of trees were snapped or uprooted. At a church complex, the main church's roof was heavily damaged and several camp buildings were destroyed. A number of outbuildings were destroyed, significant roof damage was inflicted to several residences, and several vehicles were damaged.						
EF1	Weir	Choctaw	MS	33.2625°N 89.2957°W	06:40–06:41	0.61 mi (0.98 km)	75 yd (69 m)
EF1	Several large trees were snapped, one of which fell on a house, severely damaging its roof. Minor damage was inflicted to several mobile homes and a church, and the roof was blown off a shed.						
EF1	ENE of Weir to SE of Ackerman	Choctaw	MS	33.2839°N 89.24°W	06:46–06:53	6.52 mi (10.49 km)	75 yd (69 m)
EF1	A number of trees were snapped and uprooted, and a couple of small outbuildings sustained roof damage.						
EF1	Starkville	Oktibbeha	MS	33.4386°N 88.8419°W	07:15–07:18	1.29 mi (2.08 km)	250 yd (230 m)
EF1	The roof of a metal commercial building was pulled back and its overhead door was blown in. A number of soccer goals and dugouts were blown over and some fencing was damaged. The entire roofing structure of one apartment building was removed, the façade was blown off another building, and several other structures suffered shingle or fascia damage. Part of a roof of a carwash was blown off, a church sustained gutter damage, and some power lines and several trees were downed.						
EF2	ENE of Preston to E of Gholson	Kemper, Noxubee	MS	32.9012°N 88.7666°W	08:00–08:09	6.07 mi (9.77 km)	860 yd (790 m)
EF2	Numerous trees were snapped and uprooted. The roof and some walls were removed from one home, while several others sustained roof and window damage as well. Two outbuildings, a shed, and a well-built garage were destroyed, while several others were severely damaged.						
EF3	SE of Macon to W of Memphis, AL	Noxubee	MS	33.0609°N 88.464°W	08:25–08:41	9.63 mi (15.50 km)	1,330 yd (1,220 m)
EF3	Numerous trees were snapped or uprooted, with one completely debarked, and several power poles were snapped. A barn, milk house, silo, and mobile home were completely destroyed on a dairy farm. A metal farm building and an office were destroyed, while an 18-wheeler was pushed approximately 25 yards (23 m). The second story of a house, a barn, and some metal buildings at a pig farm were destroyed, and a pivot was overturned. Other homes sustained roof damage.						
EF1	SW of Moscow to SW of De Kalb	Kemper	MS	32.6646°N 88.8355°W	08:56–09:09	11.06 mi (17.80 km)	440 yd (400 m)
EF1	The roof was blown off a wood-frame home and several others sustained minor shingle damage. Numerous outbuildings were severely damaged or destroyed, and numerous trees were snapped or uprooted.						

=== January 9 event ===
List of confirmed tornadoes – Sunday, January 9, 2011
EF#	Location	County / Parish	State	Start Coord.	Time (UTC)	Path length	Max width
EF1	ESE of Alice to northwestern Robstown to western Corpus Christi	Jim Wells, Nueces	TX	27.7107°N 97.9663°W	09:25–09:51	23.3 mi (37.5 km)	200 yd (180 m)
EF1	A long-track tornado initially damaged trees and blew down two power poles before moving into Nueces County. Two large sheds, a barn and a tractor were destroyed southwest of Robstown. As the tornado moved through the northwest side of town, numerous trees were snapped and several home had damage to either their shingles or wooden roofing. Debris was strewn across the Robstown High School campus and a large section of the roof of the gymnasium at the school was torn off. Two fifteen-ton air conditioning units were blown off the roof of the auditorium at the school as well. The tornado then damaged hundreds of cars at two dealerships just outside of Calallen. The tornado lifted just after entering the neighborhood. Damage to power lines and poles, large trees and signs occurred throughout most of the tornado's path as well.						

=== January 17 event ===
List of confirmed tornadoes – Monday, January 17, 2011
EF#	Location	County / Parish	State	Start Coord.	Time (UTC)	Path length	Max width
EF0	W of Port St. John	Orange	FL	28.49°N 80.865°W	16:03	0.05 mi (0.080 km)	20 yd (18 m)
EF0	An off-duty USAF weather observer spotted a tornado with an evident debris cloud over rural land in the Tosohatchee Wildlife Management Area. No known damage occurred.						

=== January 25 event ===
List of confirmed tornadoes – Tuesday, January 25, 2011
EF#	Location	County / Parish	State	Start Coord.	Time (UTC)	Path length	Max width
EF0	Wildwood	Sumter	FL	28.873°N 82.032°W	21:35–21:37	0.9 mi (1.4 km)	30 yd (27 m)
EF0	A photo was taken of a tornado in an open field in town; no damage occurred.						
EF0	NNE of Myakka City	Manatee	FL	27.4602°N 82.1379°W	23:15–23:17	0.98 mi (1.58 km)	30 yd (27 m)
EF0	A tornado was reported over rural land.						
EF0	Sweetwater Ranch area	Hardee	FL	27.41°N 81.7°W	23:41–23:43	0.86 mi (1.38 km)	30 yd (27 m)
EF0	This tornado was reported in rural areas of Hardee County.						
EF0	SSW of Oak Grove	Hardee	FL	27.46°N 81.89°W	00:08–00:10	1.14 mi (1.83 km)	30 yd (27 m)
EF0	A tornado was reported over open land.						
EF0	Alva	Lee	FL	26.7159°N 81.5996°W	00:40–00:42	0.32 mi (0.51 km)	50 yd (46 m)
EF0	This tornado damaged or destroyed six mobile homes. Porch damage, broken screens, roof damage and a destroyed carport were all noted.						
EF0	SE of Sebring	Highlands	FL	27.4391°N 81.3698°W	01:09–01:11	0.93 mi (1.50 km)	30 yd (27 m)
EF0	Several trees and numerous tree branches were downed along with some fencing on the northwest side of a subdivision.						
EF0	Eastern Boca Del Mar	Palm Beach	FL	26.3459°N 80.1321°W	03:50–03:51	0.2 mi (0.32 km)	50 yd (46 m)
EF0	A large avocado tree was uprooted and several large branches were snapped off. Approximately thirty other trees were damaged.						

== February ==
Confirmed tornadoes by Enhanced Fujita rating
EFU	EF0	EF1	EF2	EF3	EF4	EF5	Total
0	21	32	12	1	0	0	66

=== February 1 event ===
List of confirmed tornadoes – Tuesday, February 1, 2011
EF#	Location	County / Parish	State	Start Coord.	Time (UTC)	Path length	Max width
EF1	SSE of Stewart	Rusk	TX	32.291°N 94.6588°W	12:10–12:11	0.64 mi (1.03 km)	100 yd (91 m)
EF1	A brick home lost much of its roof and debris from it damaged a nearby home. A chicken coop was destroyed and numerous trees were snapped or uprooted.						
EF0	N of Many	Sabine	LA	31.6396°N 93.4925°W	14:24–14:32	6.03 mi (9.70 km)	50 yd (46 m)
EF0	Many trees were snapped or uprooted along the tornado's intermittent path. One outbuilding was damaged by fallen tree limbs as well.						
EF0	ESE of Abbeville	Henry	AL	31.5515°N 85.1902°W	02:06–02:10	1.59 mi (2.56 km)	40 yd (37 m)
EF0	A brief tornado touched down, several times, within a straight-line wind event. Numerous trees were downed or uprooted and a few structured sustained roof damage.						

=== February 11 event ===
List of confirmed tornadoes – Friday, February 11, 2011
EF#	Location	County / Parish	State	Start Coord.	Time (UTC)	Path length	Max width
EF0	Kihei	Maui	HI	20.7719°N 156.4477°W	00:15	0.01 mi (0.016 km)	10 yd (9.1 m)
EF0	A tornado briefly touched down without causing damage.						

=== February 24 event ===
List of confirmed tornadoes – Thursday, February 24, 2011
EF#	Location	County / Parish	State	Start Coord.	Time (UTC)	Path length	Max width
EF1	NW of Paron	Saline, Perry, Pulaski	AR	34.7782°N 92.8653°W	21:53–22:05	11.09 mi (17.85 km)	80 yd (73 m)
EF1	Numerous trees were blown down along the path of the tornado. One barn was also destroyed and another damaged.						
EF1	NNE of Scott	Lonoke	AR	34.7304°N 92.0772°W	22:56–22:58	2.32 mi (3.73 km)	100 yd (91 m)
EF1	Many houses were damaged and a metal building and a shed were destroyed along Bearskin Lake. Numerous trees were blown down.						
EF1	Southern Lonoke	Lonoke	AR	34.7708°N 91.9045°W	23:03–23:05	1.57 mi (2.53 km)	235 yd (215 m)
EF1	Significant damage in town. One house was destroyed and many others were damaged, most of which sustained roof damage. A porch was also blown off a church and the Arkansas National Guard armory sustained roof damage. Extensive tree and power line damage.						
EF0	S of Hickman	Fulton	KY	36.5602°N 89.1789°W	00:15–00:17	1.11 mi (1.79 km)	50 yd (46 m)
EF0	Several houses were damaged, a garage and patio were heavily damaged and fencing was destroyed at a baseball field.						
EF1	N of Fulton to ESE of Water Valley	Fulton, Hickman, Graves	KY	36.5256°N 88.889°W	00:32–00:46	7.18 mi (11.56 km)	100 yd (91 m)
EF1	Numerous houses were damaged and two grain bins were thrown. Heavy damage to sheds, barns and outbuildings.						
EF1	Kilbourne	West Carroll	LA	32.9763°N 91.4311°W	01:25–01:30	6.5 mi (10.5 km)	75 yd (69 m)
EF1	Two trailers were heavily damaged and a church sustained roof damage. Numerous trees were also knocked down, some landing on houses.						
EF2	NE of Gracey to NNW of Hopkinsville	Christian	KY	36.8956°N 87.618°W	01:50–01:58	5.68 mi (9.14 km)	300 yd (270 m)
EF2	Several houses were damaged and barns were destroyed. Extensive tree and power line damage.						
EF2	Grace to N of Anguilla	Issaquena, Washington, Sharkey	MS	33°N 90.96°W	01:50–02:01	7.34 mi (11.81 km)	400 yd (370 m)
EF2	One house sustained moderate damage and several metal buildings were heavily damaged or destroyed.						
EF2	N of Darden to NE of Pine View	Henderson, Decatur, Perry	TN	35.6643°N 88.237°W	02:28–02:50	19.36 mi (31.16 km)	400 yd (370 m)
EF2	This strong tornado initially caused scattered tree damage through forests and pastures before inflicting major damage to a mobile home. A large grain bin was also tossed 50 yd (46 m) and destroyed, and there was minor damage to trees and homes nearby. Several tombstones were also overturned and damaged in a local cemetery. Along the west side of the Tennessee River, eight homes were significantly damaged, along with private boat docks and pontoon boats. A roof to a floating boat dock was lifted off and tossed across the inlet. After crossing the river, tree damage continued including some of which fell on homes. Several mobile homes and another older home had their roofs blown off as well before the tornado dissipated.						
EF0	W of Lobelville	Perry	TN	35.77°N 87.88°W	02:51–02:52	1.05 mi (1.69 km)	100 yd (91 m)
EF0	A brief tornado was discovered via high-resolution satellite imagery. Dozens of trees were blown down across its short path.						
EF1	W of Clarksville	Montgomery	TN	36.53°N 87.46°W	03:05–03:07	2.69 mi (4.33 km)	50 yd (46 m)
EF1	A house lost part of its roof and dozens of trees were uprooted and snapped.						
EF0	NE of Whitfield	Hickman	TN	35.84°N 87.6°W	03:07–03:09	2.34 mi (3.77 km)	150 yd (140 m)
EF0	This tornado was discovered using high-resolution satellite imagery. Numerous trees were blown down intermittently in all directions along the path.						
EF1	Nashville to S of Hendersonville	Davidson, Sumner, Wilson	TN	36.19°N 86.77°W	03:51–04:05	14.58 mi (23.46 km)	500 yd (460 m)
EF1	Originally thought to be a long path of wind damage, reanalysis determined the event was an EF1 tornado embedded within a line of storms. Just north of downtown Nashville, at least a hundred trees were uprooted and snapped. Fallen trees damaged some roofs and vehicles, some shingles were blown and some siding was ripped off of homes, three power poles were snapped and a wood fence was blown down. In southern Hendersonville, at least another hundred trees were uprooted, including a few snapped ones. Trees that had fallen had damaged some roofs and vehicles in the area. Shingle loss was also noted on some homes. Crossing the Cumberland River, numerous trees and power lines continued to be blown down and several carports were destroyed before the tornado lifted.						
EF2	Southeast Nashville to Rural Hill	Davidson, Wilson	TN	36.0871°N 86.6163°W	04:02–04:07	7.69 mi (12.38 km)	100 yd (91 m)
EF2	A strong tornado significantly damaged the roofs of two churches and approximately ten homes. A couple of homes had complete roof loss, including a two-story home which lost most of its second floor. The tornado then crossed Percy Priest Lake, causing minor damage on the east side before lifting.						
EF2	Gladeville to southern Lebanon	Wilson	TN	36.1188°N 86.4179°W	04:14–04:22	7.99 mi (12.86 km)	150 yd (140 m)
EF2	Several warehouse buildings suffered significant roof and wall damage, and a construction trailer was completely destroyed with debris spread out over hundreds of yards. A high-tension metal truss tower was completely bent over. Hundreds of trees were either snapped or uprooted. Two injuries occurred.						
EF0	Northwestern Hackleburg	Marion	AL	34.2858°N 87.8578°W	04:18–04:19	0.57 mi (0.92 km)	100 yd (91 m)
EF0	A brief tornado did extensive damage to numerous chicken houses, sheds and outbuildings by removing pieces of tin roofing and peeling off metal siding. A few of the small buildings had their roofs completely removed and one chicken house was completely destroyed. Many trees were downed, with several of them damaging homes. An outdoor recreation facility suffered minor roof damage and a couple light poles were knocked down in the parking lot. The tornado also knocked down a TV tower.						

=== February 25 event ===
List of confirmed tornadoes – Friday, February 25, 2011
EF#	Location	County / Parish	State	Start Coord.	Time (UTC)	Path length	Max width
EF0	E of Battleground	Cullman	AL	34.3015°N 86.9734°W	05:10–05:11	0.24 mi (0.39 km)	20 yd (18 m)
EF0	This tornado originally snapped and twisted a couple of trees before destroying a large, unoccupied chicken barn. Debris from the barn was spread out into nearby trees and damaged an adjacent home and mobile home.						
EF0	Mather	Sacramento	CA	38.5647°N 121.2961°W	23:00–23:11	0.35 mi (0.56 km)	10 yd (9.1 m)
EF0	A weak tornado touched down on the northside of Mather Air Force Base and moved into an industrial park, damaging a few trees, broke road signs and broke windows on multiple cars.						

=== February 27 event ===
List of confirmed tornadoes – Sunday, February 27, 2011
EF#	Location	County / Parish	State	Start Coord.	Time (UTC)	Path length	Max width
EF0	NNW of Grainola, OK	Osage (OK), Cowley (KS)	OK, KS	38.9901°N 96.6708°W	00:21–00:26	3.47 mi (5.58 km)	75 yd (69 m)
EF0	A KOTV-DT meteorologist witnessed a tornado from the station's helicopter during a live broadcast. The tornado remained over open land and caused no damage.						
EF0	S of Cedar Vale	Chautauqua	KS	37.0344°N 96.4843°W	00:34–00:37	0.95 mi (1.53 km)	75 yd (69 m)
EF0	This tornado touched down briefly over open country.						
EF1	SE of Shelbina	Shelby	MO	39.6669°N 92.0356°W	00:45–00:46	1.03 mi (1.66 km)	30 yd (27 m)
EF1	A small storage was damaged and had its debris scattered across a nearby highway. The tornado continued east-northeast, severely damaging a large metal farm building before lifting.						
EF0	SSE of Shelbina	Monroe, Shelby	MO	39.6573°N 92.0353°W	00:48–00:50	2.02 mi (3.25 km)	20 yd (18 m)
EF0	Several metal machine sheds were damaged in Monroe County. In Shelby County, a farmstead had small grain bins destroyed, one of which was wrapped around a power pole. A larger grain bin was partially shifted off its foundation and suffered a partial collapse. A nearby windmill was also destroyed.						
EF0	W of Reading	Pike	MO	39.4786°N 92.2125°W	02:05–02:08	2.28 mi (3.67 km)	40 yd (37 m)
EF0	Several large pine trees were snapped about half way up their trunks with the tops not being found.						
EF0	E of Frankford	Pike	MO	39.4972°N 91.2872°W	02:05–02:07	1.41 mi (2.27 km)	40 yd (37 m)
EF0	A machine shed was severely damaged with several missiles from the shed being embedded into the ground. Three more machine sheds were destroyed along the tornado's path before dissipating.						
EF1	WSW of Judge	Osage	MO	38.4062°N 91.8152°W	04:15–04:16	0.24 mi (0.39 km)	50 yd (46 m)
EF1	This tornado struck a farmstead, destroying a large barn and broke several windows on a brick home. Roofing materials were also removed from the home. A few trees were snapped as well.						
EF1	N of Rosebud	Gasconade	MO	38.5009°N 91.4039°W	04:33–04:34	0.74 mi (1.19 km)	175 yd (160 m)
EF1	A tornado touched down and initially broke and uprooted numerous trees before blowing over a hay wagon and overturning a couple of tanks and farm equipment. A nearby home sustained minor roof damage and a shed was completely flattened. The tornado downed more trees before blowing part of a large barns roof off. A few more trees were blown down before the tornado dissipated.						
EF1	W of Augusta to N of St. Albans	St. Charles, Franklin	MO	38.5769°N 90.9395°W	04:53–05:04	9.35 mi (15.05 km)	200 yd (180 m)
EF1	An intermittent tornado fully removed the roof of a century old home at a winery and inflicted significant tree and home damage elsewhere.						

=== February 28 event ===
List of confirmed tornadoes – Monday, February 28, 2011
EF#	Location	County / Parish	State	Start Coord.	Time (UTC)	Path length	Max width
EF1	Northwestern Wildwood (1st tornado)	St. Louis	MO	38.6191°N 90.7161°W	05:03–05:04	0.15 mi (0.24 km)	50 yd (46 m)
EF1	Some trees were damaged.						
EF1	Northwestern Wildwood (2nd tornado)	St. Louis	MO	38.6101°N 90.6965°W	05:04–05:05	0.36 mi (0.58 km)	75 yd (69 m)
EF1	This tornado occurred in Babler State Park, uprooting or snapping several large trees.						
EF1	Northwestern Wildwood (3rd tornado)	St. Louis	MO	38.6214°N 90.6909°W	05:05–05:06	0.91 mi (1.46 km)	200 yd (180 m)
EF1	A tornado struck a farmstead in Babler State Park, partially removing the roof of a barn and snapping or uprooting numerous trees.						
EF1	Northwestern Wildwood (4th tornado)	St. Louis	MO	38.6092°N 90.6859°W	05:06–05:08	0.74 mi (1.19 km)	50 yd (46 m)
EF1	On the southern side of Babler State Park, several large trees were either snapped or uprooted at a campground area.						
EF1	Northern Wildwood (5th tornado)	St. Louis	MO	38.6164°N 90.6624°W	05:10–05:12	0.6 mi (0.97 km)	70 yd (64 m)
EF1	Minor shingle damage was inflicted to a few homes. Minor to extensive tree damage also occurred.						
EF1	SW of Ingalls	Madison	IN	39.9509°N 85.8192°W	05:30–05:32	0.63 mi (1.01 km)	40 yd (37 m)
EF1	This small, brief tornado removed the roof off of a house, damaged a large barn, destroyed a pole barn, damaged another home and a trailer. Tree damage also occurred.						
EF1	Granite City	Madison	IL	38.7138°N 90.1643°W	05:35–05:38	3.26 mi (5.25 km)	100 yd (91 m)
EF1	A large storage facility lost much of its roof. Significant tree and roof damage also occurred.						
EF1	Southern Edwardsville	Madison	IL	38.7807°N 89.9818°W	05:39–05:41	2.41 mi (3.88 km)	150 yd (140 m)
EF1	A metal industrial building sustained roof and siding damage. A few signs of local businesses were damaged and a Home Depot sustained some damage to small sheds sitting outside the store. Several houses then sustained minor roof and siding damage before the tornado dissipated. Several cedar trees were also uprooted.						
EF1	E of Edwardsville	Madison	IL	38.775°N 89.9019°W	05:42–05:45	1.96 mi (3.15 km)	50 yd (46 m)
EF1	This tornado downed a few power poles before crossing I-55, producing minor tree damage around the interstate. The tornado then produced roof and siding damage to a couple of homes, with one home having part of the roof decking removed and another having a flag pole bent significantly. Further along the path, a barn was destroyed with debris strewn into an open field nearby. The tornado snapped several pine trees before lifting.						
EF2	Troy	Madison	IL	38.7308°N 89.9266°W	05:45–05:48	2.7 mi (4.3 km)	200 yd (180 m)
EF2	A strong tornado completely removed the roof from a well-constructed home, injuring the occupant. Minor to moderate damage continued throughout town, including damage to numerous trees, power lines and roof before lifting.						
EF1	SE of Old Ripley to WNW of Stubblefield	Bond	IL	38.8669°N 89.5493°W	05:57–06:00	2.7 mi (4.3 km)	50 yd (46 m)
EF1	This tornado initially caused shingle and other minor damage to a home at a farmstead along with several trees snapped at their trunks. A granary was also destroyed with the debris tossed over 50 yd (46 m). A large metal storage shed lost its roof and had two walls blown out. The tornado skipped east, hitting another farmstead causing damage to a silo and roof.						
EF0	Southern Okawville	Washington	IL	38.423°N 89.5574°W	06:03–06:06	2.77 mi (4.46 km)	50 yd (46 m)
EF0	This weak tornado damaged a grain elevator and produced minor damage to roofs and exteriors of houses nearby. A school also sustained some minor roof damage. The tornado continued east through the town, snapping a tree. A house then had its roof damaged, but by the time of survey the roof was already being repaired. Minor tree damage and an outbuilding was also destroyed nearby, just before the tornado lifted.						
EF2	W of New Minden	Washington	IL	38.444°N 89.4215°W	06:08–06:11	2.34 mi (3.77 km)	100 yd (91 m)
EF2	A strong tornado did minor damage to a building under construction at a saw mill. A few trees were also damaged just to the east. The tornado continued east, where it struck a farmstead causing considerable damage. A large machine shed was completely destroyed and a grain bin was destroyed as well. Two other barns sustained damage, with one being pushed off its foundation by several feet. The debris from the machine shed impacted the garage, house and a workshop with several pieces of debris embedded in the ground and the structures themselves. The home sustained multiple broken windows from flying debris. The roof of the home had at least five rafters damage by a large piece of debris as well.						
EF2	Confidence	Fayette	IL	38.9221°N 88.9293°W	06:27–06:28	1.26 mi (2.03 km)	90 yd (82 m)
EF2	This low-end EF2 tornado touched down in Confidence, immediately causing damage to a residence, trees and outbuildings. The tornado continued east-northeast, damaging several more homes and farm buildings. One of the home was shifted 22 ft (6.7 m) off its foundation and another was shifted 6 ft (1.8 m). Lumber from the roof of a home was driven into the siding and foundation of another home. The tornado then skipped through a wooded area before lifting.						
EF1	SE of St. Elmo	Fayette	IL	39.0163°N 88.8341°W	06:32–06:33	0.15 mi (0.24 km)	10 yd (9.1 m)
EF1	This very brief tornado touched down on a farm, blowing out the wall of a large metal storage building. Several 2x4s were driven several feet into the ground.						
EF2	SE of St. Elmo	Fayette	IL	38.9964°N 88.8072°W	06:33–06:34	0.08 mi (0.13 km)	50 yd (46 m)
EF2	An extremely brief but strong tornado destroyed two large farm buildings and tossed debris into Effingham County. Other farm buildings also sustained damage and the tornado lifted just before the county line.						
EF1	WSW of Johnson to Owensville to Somerville	Gibson	IN	38.27°N 87.7906°W	07:36–08:04	23.32 mi (37.53 km)	250 yd (230 m)
EF1	A long-track tornado shifted a mobile home off its foundation and destroyed a garage. About a half-dozen homes sustained shingle damage with some other minor damage as well. Numerous large trees were blown down. A couple of barns were partially unroofed.						
EF2	ESE of Princeton to Oakland City to WSW of Velpen	Gibson, Pike	IN	38.336°N 87.3224°W	07:51–08:09	22.01 mi (35.42 km)	550 yd (500 m)
EF2	This long-track, low-end EF2 tornado first uprooted several trees and blew down an antenna just southeast of Princeton. Further east, shingles were ripped off of two homes and another antenna was downed. The tornado then entered Oakland City, where two houses were destroyed and several others were heavily damaged. Tree damage continued after exiting town with over hundreds of large trees being snapped or uprooted. A few barns also had their roofs blown off and a garage was demolished. The tornado lifted just after entering the Patoka River National Wildlife Refuge and Management Area.						
EF0	SW of Otwell	Pike	IN	38.4244°N 87.1327°W	08:10–08:14	1.93 mi (3.11 km)	200 yd (180 m)
EF0	A few homes suffered partial roof loss while several more homes sustained damage to shingles. The roof was blown off a two-car garage and a large farm shed. bout a dozen trees were blown down or damaged.						
EF2	ENE of Millersport to southern Jasper to Celestine	Dubois	IN	38.34°N 87°W	08:19–08:30	14.17 mi (22.80 km)	225 yd (206 m)
EF2	This strong tornado damaged several large metal buildings, a large barn and a radio tower near its starting point. The tornado remained weak most of its path, including through the extreme southern side of Jasper, but the tornado finally strengthened as it struck Celestine. Roofs were blown off two brick homes with one of the homes suffering collapsed walls. A double-wide trailer was blown off its foundation and an RV was tossed across the road, with a minor injury occurring there.						
EF1	Eastern Jeffersonville, IN to Utica, IN to western Prospect, KY	Clark (IN), Jefferson (KY)	IN, KY	38.3344°N 85.6886°W	09:29–09:31	3.03 mi (4.88 km)	100 yd (91 m)
EF1	In Indiana, large trees were uprooted throughout most the path. A house had its tin roof blown off and a couple of garage doors were dented in. The tornado then crossed the Ohio River into Kentucky, where a small section of roof was blown off a house and numerous trees were snapped.						
EF3	SE of Eminence to NW of Pleasureville	Henry	KY	38.351°N 85.1598°W	09:59–10:01	2.26 mi (3.64 km)	150 yd (140 m)
EF3	This intense, low-end EF3 tornado tracked through the Springhill Estates subdivision, causing two homes to be destroyed along with three outbuildings. Trees were uprooted and snapped as well. Further northeast, fifteen power poles were blown down along a highway. One barn was destroyed and another had the roof blown off. More trees were downed and another outbuilding was damaged before the tornado lifted. One injury occurred.						
EF1	NNE of Thurston to NNW of New Salem	Fairfield	OH	39.861°N 82.537°W	11:00–11:03	2.41 mi (3.88 km)	75 yd (69 m)
EF1	A tornado initially caused tree damage before tossing and rolling metal grain bins at a farm. A masonry wall was also flattened and numerous objects were impaled into the ground. A newly constructed barn had its roof removed and numerous pieces of sheet metal were strewn into adjoining fields. The tornado continued on and struck two residences. A modular home and the roof completely removed and tossed. A barn was completely destroyed in the area as well. At another residence, one of the exterior walls buckled from the tornado. Corn stalks were driven into the ground from a nearby field and a stick was found driven into the siding of the home.						
EF1	Southern Stanford to NNW of Crab Orchard	Lincoln	KY	37.52°N 84.68°W	11:49–11:56	8.7 mi (14.0 km)	250 yd (230 m)
EF1	A middle school, large barns and outbuildings were all damaged. Some trees were snapped as well.						
EF1	SW of Helechawa	Wolfe	KY	37.7467°N 83.3719°W	12:37–12:38	0.25 mi (0.40 km)	100 yd (91 m)
EF1	Numerous trees were snapped along the tornados path. One mobile home had its roof blown off and was pushed 5 ft (1.5 m) off its foundation. A barn was destroyed and two other mobile homes had roof and siding damage. A small outbuilding that was used as a sawmill was also destroyed.						
EF1	NW of Plevna	Madison	AL	34.99°N 86.5048°W	18:18–18:25	3.92 mi (6.31 km)	200 yd (180 m)
EF1	A well-built shed was demolished ad several bans were significantly damaged. Further east, multiple sheds were demolished or had roofs removed, numerous trees were snapped and uprooted and a mobile home had its roof peeled off.						
EF2	Eastern Lynchburg to NE of Estill Springs	Moore, Franklin	TN	35.27°N 86.33°W	18:18–18:25	16.1 mi (25.9 km)	600 yd (550 m)
EF2	1 death – This strong tornado destroyed several mobile homes injuring four people. Power poles and trees were also snapped with other homes sustaining significant roof damage. In Franklin County, a fatality occurred when a mobile home was tossed 70 yd (64 m) with an occupant.						
EF0	South Pittsburg	Marion	TN	35.0003°N 85.7147°W	19:00–19:05	0.01 mi (0.016 km)	20 yd (18 m)
EF0	A weak, short-lived tornado downed two trees and partially damaged a roof.						
EF1	Signal Mountain	Hamilton	TN	35.13°N 86.35°W	19:25–19:35	2.2 mi (3.5 km)	90 yd (82 m)
EF1	Roughly twenty-five homes were damaged and numerous trees were downed.						
EF0	E of Alpine	Talladega	AL	33.354°N 86.2212°W	21:53–21:54	0.34 mi (0.55 km)	50 yd (46 m)
EF0	A brief tornado damaged the front porch of a home and metal roofs of several outbuildings were partially removed. Several trees were snapped or uprooted.						
EF0	E of Slater-Marietta	Greenville	SC	35.053°N 82.444°W	22:02–22:03	1.53 mi (2.46 km)	50 yd (46 m)
EF0	This weak tornado occurred within a larger area of downburst winds. Numerous trees were snapped or uprooted, one of which fell onto and damaged a mobile home. A metal awning was also tossed.						
EF0	SW of Pine Level to northwestern Elmore	Autauga, Elmore	AL	32.5699°N 86.4854°W	23:05–23:20	8.94 mi (14.39 km)	200 yd (180 m)
EF0	In Autauga County, numerous trees were snapped or uprooted and several homes sustained minor shingle or soffit damage. One mobile home sustained significant roof damage. In Elmore County, dozens of trees were snapped or uprooted and numerous homes sustained minor roof damage. One mobile home was overturned, but its walls remained intact.						
EF0	NNE of White Plains	Chambers	AL	33.0073°N 85.3988°W	23:28–23:30	1.91 mi (3.07 km)	30 yd (27 m)
EF0	A dozen trees were blown down, damaging a few vehicles. At least six homes sustained minor roof, shingle or skirting damage. One barn was destroyed.						
EF1	NE of Hayneville to WNW of Pintlala	Lowndes	AL	32.2105°N 86.5114°W	23:37–23:42	4.96 mi (7.98 km)	200 yd (180 m)
EF1	Five grain elevators were destroyed, three chicken houses were damaged and one home had nearly all of its roof blown off. Numerous trees were also snapped.						
EF1	N of Silverstreet	Newberry	SC	34.2496°N 81.728°W	00:24–00:30	3.38 mi (5.44 km)	100 yd (91 m)
EF1	One mobile was destroyed and another severely damaged.						

== March ==
Confirmed tornadoes by Enhanced Fujita rating
EFU	EF0	EF1	EF2	EF3	EF4	EF5	Total
0	36	29	9	1	0	0	75

=== March 5 event ===
List of confirmed tornadoes – Saturday, March 5, 2011
EF#	Location	County / Parish	State	Start Coord.	Time (UTC)	Path length	Max width
EF0	E of Hayes to NW of Lake Arthur	Jefferson Davis	LA	30.1088°N 92.8309°W	14:30–14:41	4.82 mi (7.76 km)	25 yd (23 m)
EF0	Power lines were blown down and several farm buildings received minor damage.						
EF0	SW of Jennings	Jefferson Davis	LA	30.1542°N 92.7322°W	14:50–14:59	2.73 mi (4.39 km)	25 yd (23 m)
EF0	A mobile home lost part of its roof and tree limbs and power poles were blown down.						
EF0	Northwestern Crowley	Acadia	LA	30.2344°N 92.4003°W	15:44–15:47	1.05 mi (1.69 km)	25 yd (23 m)
EF0	This weak tornado touched down alongside I-10, striking a Waffle House. The roof, signage and windows were all minorly damaged, with shattered glass from the windows injuring three people. A nearby storage building at a car wash collapsed and several other buildings in that area suffered minor roof damage. A few trees and tree limbs were also blown down.						
EF2	E of Crowley to northern Rayne to NW of Duson	Acadia	LA	30.219°N 92.3142°W	15:51–16:03	6.99 mi (11.25 km)	250 yd (230 m)
EF2	1 death – A strong tornado began by initially destroying a few outbuildings and blowing down a few trees in a small subdivision. The Rayne Water Treatment Plant was then struck, where three metal buildings were completely destroyed and how their debris blown over 200 yd (180 m) to the east and northeast. The tornado entered northern Rayne, demolishing two mobile homes and damaging several others. A woman was killed when a large tree fell and flattened her small home. The tornado then leveled two small homes and an abandoned two-story building. Several duplexes lost their entire roofs nearby. After crossing LA-35, another duplex and an auto parts store lost much of their roofs. Several security cameras from nearby buildings filmed the tornado. The tornado weakened moving into northeastern Rayne, causing minor roof and exterior damage to Rayne High School and its stadium. The tornado crossed I-10, snapping several pine trees and doing minor damage to buildings. Minor damage continued to be observed to a few more buildings. Officially, forty-two houses were destroyed, forty-eight houses sustained major damage, seventy-nine house suffered moderate damage, and another five hundred fourteen houses received minor damage. In total, six hundred eighty-three homes were damaged to some capacity. Eleven injuries also occurred.						
EF1	E of Zachary	East Baton Rouge	LA	30.65°N 91.0878°W	18:20	0.3 mi (0.48 km)	40 yd (37 m)
EF1	This tornado removed a portion of a roof and the back wall of a home. An outbuilding and shed were heavily damaged, with tin and insulation from them wrapped in trees. A large trees was also knocked over with several large tree limbs snapped around it.						
EF0	S of Satsuma	Livingston	LA	30.4132°N 90.8°W	18:27	0.25 mi (0.40 km)	30 yd (27 m)
EF0	A weak tornado removed a large portion of roof and its exterior walls from a house. Large tree limbs were snapped and sheet metal was wrapped in trees.						
EF1	Northern Schriever	Terrebonne	LA	29.779°N 90.82°W	18:32	0.5 mi (0.80 km)	30 yd (27 m)
EF1	Several homes had roof damage and windows blown in, including one mobile that was heavily damaged. Large tree limbs were snapped and a van was rolled 20 ft (6.1 m)						

=== March 6 event ===
List of confirmed tornadoes – Sunday, March 6, 2011
EF#	Location	County / Parish	State	Start Coord.	Time (UTC)	Path length	Max width
EF0	Rolesville	Wake	NC	35.926°N 78.4534°W	22:10–22:13	2.34 mi (3.77 km)	50 yd (46 m)
EF0	A weak tornado occurred in Rolesville, initially snapping numerous trees and damaging buildings. Shingles were torn from a home and the roof of a porch was lifted off. A greenhouse was destroyed at a pure seed testing facility. Several outbuildings at the facility also had their tin roofing removed. A carport was ripped from the side of a house and two outbuildings were also destroyed on the property of the home. A one-story church experienced minor roof damage with numerous shingles ripped from the roof. Trees were blown down and outbuildings were damaged along US-401. A car was damaged from a large, falling tree limb. The tornado lifted shortly after destroying another outbuilding. One man was injured after the tornado downed trees which downed power lines onto a house, causing it to catch fire.						
EF0	SSE of Stantonsburg	Wilson	NC	35.5878°N 77.8092°W	23:17–23:19	0.38 mi (0.61 km)	25 yd (23 m)
EF0	Approximately seventy to eighty trees were damaged, with most of them being twisted and snapped.						
EF0	S of Stantonsburg	Greene	NC	35.56°N 77.81°W	23:17–23:18	0.38 mi (0.61 km)	25 yd (23 m)
EF0	An outbuilding had its roof blown off and a house was minorly damaged.						

=== March 8 event ===
List of confirmed tornadoes – Tuesday, March 8, 2011
EF#	Location	County / Parish	State	Start Coord.	Time (UTC)	Path length	Max width
EF0	E of Petty to SW of Brookston	Lamar	TX	33.6057°N 95.7824°W	22:10–22:15	4.02 mi (6.47 km)	60 yd (55 m)
EF0	A weak, intermittent tornado damage a barn.						
EF1	SSW of Bagwell to NE of Clarksville	Red River	TX	33.63°N 95.182°W	23:15–23:35	10.61 mi (17.08 km)	225 yd (206 m)
EF1	This tornado initially only damaged trees, knocking several small ones down. Eventually the tornado entered a small community north of Clarksville, approximately damaging a dozen homes roofs, awnings or carports. Numerous trees in the community were snapped as well. Just to the east, a FEMA trailer was completely destroyed with insulation and pieces of it strewn northeast and east. Numerous power poles were snapped, a semi-truck was overturned onto a small pickup truck and a home sustained moderate damage to its roof. The tornado damaged more trees before lifting.						
EF1	NE of Woodworth to S of Alexandria	Rapides	LA	31.1902°N 92.4322°W	00:47–00:53	2.18 mi (3.51 km)	50 yd (46 m)
EF1	A tornado destroyed a RV trailer, two barns and several pieces of farm equipment. Metal debris was thrown for over 1 mi (1.6 km) to the northeast across fields. Several unsecured gazebos were damaged and a few trees were blown down. A house suffered roof and awning damage with debris from the home being strewn across farm fields as well. Several more trees continued to be downed before the tornado ended.						
EF1	WNW of Woodworth	Rapides	LA	31.1645°N 92.577°W	02:57–03:04	3.47 mi (5.58 km)	50 yd (46 m)
EF1	Several trees within the Kisatchie National Forest snapped and/or uprooted.						
EF0	Libuse	Rapides	LA	31.3333°N 92.3372°W	03:30–03:34	2.71 mi (4.36 km)	25 yd (23 m)
EF0	A few trees were blown down before the tornado moved through Libuse, blowing down numerous more trees with one falling onto an outbuilding, destroying it. Another tree fell onto and crushed a mobile home and another destroyed an awning on another home. Trees continued to be blown down before the tornado lifted.						

=== March 9 event ===
List of confirmed tornadoes – Wednesday, March 9, 2011
EF#	Location	County / Parish	State	Start Coord.	Time (UTC)	Path length	Max width
EF1	NNE of Utica to W of Learned	Hinds	MS	32.1334°N 90.6135°W	07:08–07:14	6 mi (9.7 km)	250 yd (230 m)
EF1	Numerous trees were snapped and uprooted along the path, with damage also occurring to the roof of a home and a shed. A mobile home was pushed off of its blocks and the porch was blown over the mobile home. Two sheds were destroyed and damage occurred to a baseball field fence.						
EF2	NNW of Terry to SSW of Byram	Hinds	MS	32.1146°N 90.3112°W	07:34–07:37	2.24 mi (3.60 km)	150 yd (140 m)
EF2	This low-end EF2 tornado snapped and uprooted numerous trees in a convergent pattern. Several sheds and a carport were destroyed or damaged nearby. Some of the trees fell across a power line, bringing the line and a power pole down. Several houses sustained minor damage and one well-built brick house had significant roof damage inflicted. A steel gate was also torn from its hinges and heavy metal fencing was blown down by this house as well.						
EF1	Northern Lacombe to W of Nicholson, MS	St. Tammany	LA	30.3465°N 89.9379°W	10:50–11:10	11 mi (18 km)	300 yd (270 m)
EF1	A tornado touched down just south and quickly crossed I-12, impacting the Fairhope subdivision. Windows and a garage door were blown out, roof and brick veneer damage was noted. The tornado continued northeast, lifting just before crossing the Pearl River in the Bogue Chitto National Wildlife Refuge.						
EF1	Western Picayune	Pearl River	MS	30.4934°N 89.7288°W	11:25–11:35	3 mi (4.8 km)	100 yd (91 m)
EF1	Tree limbs were broken and a few trees were snapped. A metal shed was completely destroyed and a metal awning was damaged.						
EF2	W of Bush	St. Tammany	LA	30.5921°N 89.9525°W	11:45–11:50	0.5 mi (0.80 km)	100 yd (91 m)
EF2	A wood-framed house was lifted off its foundation and destroyed. Another home had about half of its roofing deck removed. Several pine trees had all limbs removed and partial debarking. One person was injured.						
EF0	Northwestern Kenner	Jefferson	LA	30.0431°N 90.2747°W	12:08–12:12	1.5 mi (2.4 km)	20 yd (18 m)
EF0	A weak tornado blew down a couple of power poles, did minor damage to fencing, twisted traffic lights and uprooted a few trees, with one falling onto a house, before moving onto Lake Pontchartrain.						
EF2	Northeastern Slidell	St. Tammany	LA	30.2918°N 89.7362°W	12:52–12:57	1.86 mi (2.99 km)	250 yd (230 m)
EF2	This strong tornado damaged approximately thirty homes in the Lake Village subdivision. Some of the homes had portions of their roofing deck removed. More damage occurred near Lewis Stables with one home suffering complete loss of its roof.						
EF1	W of Gulfport	Harrison	MS	30.4368°N 89.15°W	13:34–13:40	1 mi (1.6 km)	30 yd (27 m)
EF1	One home had a portion of its roof removed. A storage building and awning were also destroyed on the home's property. Several trees were blown down and large branches were snapped.						
EF1	Biloxi	Harrison	MS	30.4427°N 88.9339°W	13:47	0.25 mi (0.40 km)	30 yd (27 m)
EF1	Several mobile homes were damaged, including one that was rolled and destroyed. Multiple large tree limbs were snapped as well.						
EF1	NNW of Grand Bay	Mobile	AL	30.547°N 88.37°W	14:31–14:32	0.18 mi (0.29 km)	80 yd (73 m)
EF1	A horse barn was destroyed, a double-wide mobile home was moved off its foundation, several pine trees were snapped and power lines were downed.						
EF2	Tillmans Corner	Mobile	AL	30.5607°N 88.2169°W	14:37–14:40	0.91 mi (1.46 km)	100 yd (91 m)
EF2	This brief but strong, high-end EF2 tornado touched down in Tillmans Corner initially blowing the roof off of a home and knocking several trees down. The tornado strengthened as it impacted a Food World grocery store, ripping sections of the roof off and tossing several cars in the parking lot. The tornado then severely damaged a Church's Texas Chicken fast food restaurant, destroyed a gas service station nd a small metal frame shopping center. It continued to destroy small businesses, also destroyed a wood-framed home and significantly damaged several other homes and apartments. The tornado then dissipated just as it did minor damage to an apartment complex. Four people were injured.						
EF2	Silverhill	Baldwin	AL	30.5341°N 87.761°W	15:17–15:21	2.05 mi (3.30 km)	350 yd (320 m)
EF2	A strong, high-end EF2 tornado did significant damage around and in Silverhill. Two homes suffered roof damage with some of their windows blown out near the tornado's starting point. The tornado then tracked northeast, destroying or severely damaging several homes. A utility trailer was lofted and tossed over 100 yd (91 m). A pickup truck was also tossed and flipped 40 yd (37 m), injuring the drive. Major damage continued to several homes, businesses and structures before the tornado lifted.						
EF1	McDavid	Escambia	FL	30.8693°N 87.3268°W	15:28–15:33	0.54 mi (0.87 km)	80 yd (73 m)
EF1	Initially, minor roof damage occurred to two residences and several pine trees were snapped. The tornado then damaged eleven more homes, shifting one off its foundation and significantly damaging the roof of another before lifting.						
EF0	NE of Pace	Santa Rosa	FL	30.6218°N 87.1148°W	16:02–16:03	0.11 mi (0.18 km)	50 yd (46 m)
EF0	A brief tornado damaged three homes, one of them severely. The severely damaged home lost a fifth of its shingles on its roof with significant damage done to the ceilings and attic space of it. Wood fencing was also damaged by the three homes.						
EF0	NW of Doerun	Colquitt	GA	31.3254°N 83.928°W	19:10–19:20	0.4 mi (0.64 km)	30 yd (27 m)
EF0	A few trees and power lines were knocked over and a barn was minorly damaged.						

=== March 10 event ===
List of confirmed tornadoes – Thursday, March 10, 2011
EF#	Location	County / Parish	State	Start Coord.	Time (UTC)	Path length	Max width
EF0	Miami	Miami-Dade	FL	25.7508°N 80.2048°W	17:19–17:24	3.27 mi (5.26 km)	20 yd (18 m)
EF0	A NOAA employee observed swirling debris at the Rickenbacker Causeway. A few minutes later, the same person observed a funnel touching down on Virginia Key near MAST Academy. Power lines were downed with no other damage noted.						
EF1	NE of Bealeton to NE of Midland	Fauquier	VA	38.575°N 77.7605°W	23:17–23:20	4.41 mi (7.10 km)	75 yd (69 m)
EF1	Multiple trees were downed and a well-constructed barn was collapsed.						
EF0	Northern Centreville to Chantilly	Fairfax	VA	38.8517°N 77.4508°W	23:59–00:03	4.9 mi (7.9 km)	75 yd (69 m)
EF0	Many tree branches wee broken and pine trees were snapped through the path.						

=== March 14 event ===
List of confirmed tornadoes – Monday, March 14, 2011
EF#	Location	County / Parish	State	Start Coord.	Time (UTC)	Path length	Max width
EF0	S of Brandon	Rankin	MS	32.198°N 89.9697°W	19:06–19:08	1.63 mi (2.62 km)	75 yd (69 m)
EF0	This high-end EF0 tornado tracked through the Robinhood subdivision. Trees were snapped and uprooted and two barns had roof and siding damage.						

=== March 16 event ===
List of confirmed tornadoes – Wednesday, March 16, 2011
EF#	Location	County / Parish	State	Start Coord.	Time (UTC)	Path length	Max width
EF0	W of Filer to NW of Twin Falls	Twin Falls	ID	42.57°N 114.6665°W	22:00–22:10	7.36 mi (11.84 km)	10 yd (9.1 m)
EF0	Local law enforcement and members of the public observed a tornado. A metal building was blown over.						

=== March 18 event ===
List of confirmed tornadoes – Friday, March 18, 2011
EF#	Location	County / Parish	State	Start Coord.	Time (UTC)	Path length	Max width
EF1	Santa Rosa	Sonoma	CA	38.4525°N 122.7082°W	17:15	0.1 mi (0.16 km)	100 yd (91 m)
EF1	This brief tornado completely destroyed a metal building and severely bent a metal gate.						

=== March 19 event ===
List of confirmed tornadoes – Saturday, March 19, 2011
EF#	Location	County / Parish	State	Start Coord.	Time (UTC)	Path length	Max width
EF0	SSW of Cross Hill	Laurens	SC	34.2511°N 81.9934°W	22:15–22:16	0.2 mi (0.32 km)	30 yd (27 m)
EF0	A weak tornado occurred on the shore of Lake Greenwood within an area of a downburst. Several trees were knocked down and some windows were blown out of a home due to flying debris. Some siding was also stripped off of a couple of homes. Branches from trees fell onto two homes and a pontoon boat was tossed.						
EF0	NE of Abernathy	Hale	TX	33.9016°N 101.7637°W	00:03	0.1 mi (0.16 km)	75 yd (69 m)
EF0	Skywarn storm spotters and some storm chasers observed a brief tornado.						

=== March 21 event ===
List of confirmed tornadoes – Monday, March 21, 2011
EF#	Location	County / Parish	State	Start Coord.	Time (UTC)	Path length	Max width
EF0	W of Maxwell	Colusa	CA	39.28°N 122.2374°W	22:44–22:49	0.25 mi (0.40 km)	10 yd (9.1 m)
EF0	A brief tornado touched down in an open pasture.						

=== March 22 event ===
List of confirmed tornadoes – Tuesday, March 22, 2011
EF#	Location	County / Parish	State	Start Coord.	Time (UTC)	Path length	Max width
EF1	E of Uehling	Burt	NE	41.7131°N 96.4071°W	21:40–21:45	2.42 mi (3.89 km)	75 yd (69 m)
EF1	An outbuilding and large storage bins were damaged, blown over or completely destroyed. A storage shed garage door was also blown out. Telephone poles were bent, two center-pivots were flipped and a tree was also topped.						
EF1	E of Missouri Valley to SSE of Woodbine	Harrison	IA	41.5704°N 95.842°W	22:00–22:19	11.67 mi (18.78 km)	100 yd (91 m)
EF1	A mobile was destroyed, injuring the two occupants. Other homes, outbuildings and vehicles were damaged along the path as well.						
EF1	SSE of Massena to SW of Bridgewater	Cass	IA	41.1984°N 94.7511°W	22:30–22:34	2.84 mi (4.57 km)	250 yd (230 m)
EF1	Three metal outbuildings were damaged with some industrial machinery overturned.						
EF0	NE of Carbon to S of Bridgewater	Adams	IA	41.1226°N 94.7229°W	22:33–22:38	3.12 mi (5.02 km)	80 yd (73 m)
EF0	A weak tornado was observed by a storm chaser over open fields.						
EF0	ENE of Bridgewater	Adair	IA	41.2598°N 94.6436°W	22:42–22:44	0.97 mi (1.56 km)	30 yd (27 m)
EF0	A brief tornado occurred over open land.						
EF0	SW of Defiance	Shelby	IA	41.7993°N 95.3912°W	22:47–22:50	1 mi (1.6 km)	40 yd (37 m)
EF0	A storm chaser observed a rope tornado over an open field.						
EF0	N of Cromwell	Union	IA	41.0556°N 94.4704°W	23:16–23:21	1.98 mi (3.19 km)	100 yd (91 m)
EF0	This tornado was observed and remained over open land with a debris cloud.						
EF2	NW of Winterset to SW of Van Meter	Madison	IA	41.3737°N 94.1356°W	23:18–23:34	9.98 mi (16.06 km)	1,410 yd (1,290 m)
EF2	This large, strong tornado significantly damaged a newly built home and moved it off its foundation. Other homes were damaged minorly throughout the path and a few trees were snapped.						
EF0	N of Macksburg	Madison	IA	41.2958°N 94.1609°W	00:11–00:12	0.23 mi (0.37 km)	25 yd (23 m)
EF0	A brief tornado was observed by a storm spotter						

=== March 23 event ===
List of confirmed tornadoes – Wednesday, March 23, 2011
EF#	Location	County / Parish	State	Start Coord.	Time (UTC)	Path length	Max width
EF2	SW of Rillton to W of South Greensburg	Westmoreland	PA	40.28°N 79.74°W	20:45–20:54	8.96 mi (14.42 km)	300 yd (270 m)
EF2	This strong tornado began southwest of Rillton, moving due east and damaging numerous homes. Some of the homes had their entire rooves removed and one had lost an exterior wall. The next observed damage was to a bus garage with multiple structures being damaged. Continuing east, the tornado then directly struck the Hempfield Area High School campus. The scoreboard was knocked down and several light posts were snapped. Track and field equipment was displaced several hundred yards from their original locations. Extensive damage also occurred to the entry way to the football stadium for the school. The tornado then moved into the Fort Allen neighborhood, damaging the roofs of several homes before dissipating. Numerous trees were also uprooted and downed throughout the path.						
EF0	Western Williams	Colusa	CA	39.145°N 122.167°W	23:00–23:03	1.09 mi (1.75 km)	10 yd (9.1 m)
EF0	Six homes, an outbuilding, two vehicles and a small radio tower were damaged.						
EF1	E of Watertown to Alexandria	Wilson, Smith, DeKalb	TN	36.099°N 86.093°W	23:19–23:27	5.65 mi (9.09 km)	100 yd (91 m)
EF1	Near the starting point of the tornado, several homes suffered significant roof damage and a couple of barns and outbuildings were destroyed. The tornado clipped the far southwestern tip of Smith County before moving into DeKalb County and into Alexandria. Damage to the roofs of homes and businesses were observed throughout town, as well as several trees being damaged. The tornado lifted shortly after exiting town.						
EF2	E of Smithville to W of Sparta	White	TN	35.96°N 85.639°W	23:54–00:06	9 mi (14 km)	100 yd (91 m)
EF2	A low-end EF2 tornado uprooted or snapped hundreds of trees. Three homes suffered compete roofing loss and a mobile was completely destroyed with its debris scattered over a large area. Around a dozen barns and outbuildings were also destroyed.						
EF0	W of Christiana	Rutherford	TN	35.73°N 86.45°W	00:02–00:07	3 mi (4.8 km)	50 yd (46 m)
EF0	Some trees were uprooted and a small portion of shingles were removed from a few homes. A couple of outbuildings were also damaged.						
EF3	Northern Greenback	Loudon, Blount	TN	35.6596°N 84.2322°W	01:50–01:55	5.8 mi (9.3 km)	500 yd (460 m)
EF3	This low-end EF3 tornado damaged roughly twenty-six homes, some of which were completely destroyed.						

=== March 26 event ===
List of confirmed tornadoes – Saturday, March 26, 2011
EF#	Location	County / Parish	State	Start Coord.	Time (UTC)	Path length	Max width
EF1	NW of Aldrich	Shelby	AL	33.1223°N 86.9194°W	21:10–21:11	0.19 mi (0.31 km)	50 yd (46 m)
EF1	A brief tornado uprooted or snapped a dozen or so trees and part of an outbuilding's metal roof was peeled off and tossed 50 yd (46 m).						
EF0	SSE of Flintside to SW of Coney	Sumter, Crisp	GA	31.9196°N 83.933°W	21:40–21:42	0.72 mi (1.16 km)	200 yd (180 m)
EF0	The tornado touched down just west of Lake Blackshear downing a few trees, some of which fell onto and damaged two homes. A few docks were damaged as the tornado then moved over the lake, briefly becoming a waterspout before dissipating on the lake.						
EF0	NNE of Leesburg	Lee	GA	31.7475°N 84.1567°W	21:54–21:55	0.33 mi (0.53 km)	10 yd (9.1 m)
EF0	This brief tornado did minor damage to light poles, trees and outbuildings.						
EF0	Southern Georgetown	Quitman	GA	31.88°N 85.11°W	22:35–22:40	0.12 mi (0.19 km)	10 yd (9.1 m)
EF0	A tornado was reported by law enforcement but no damage was reported.						
EF1	Benevolence	Randolph	GA	31.88°N 84.74°W	23:22–23:30	0.42 mi (0.68 km)	20 yd (18 m)
EF1	A mobile home was destroyed with another mobile home severely damaged. Multiple outbuildings were destroyed and several trees and power lines were also downed throughout town.						
EF0	NNE of Aaron	Bulloch	GA	32.61°N 81.95°W	23:40–23:41	0.6 mi (0.97 km)	100 yd (91 m)
EF0	Two mobile homes had their siding and under-siding damaged along with some minor damage to the shingles on their roofs. Dozens of trees were also snapped and uprooted.						
EF1	NE of Aaron to WNW of Blitch	Bulloch	GA	32.61°N 81.91°W	23:42–23:46	3.1 mi (5.0 km)	440 yd (400 m)
EF1	A mobile home was completely destroyed and tossed 30 yd (27 m) from its foundation. Several outbuildings, sheds and carports were damaged or destroyed and hundreds of trees were snapped or uprooted.						
EF1	Brewton	Laurens	GA	32.6°N 82.8309°W	01:36–01:41	3.5 mi (5.6 km)	500 yd (460 m)
EF1	This low-end EF1 tornado downed several hundreds trees throughout its path, with multiple trees falling onto homes. A few other homes had minor roof and siding damage inflicted from the tornado, including one home which had its front porch blown off.						

=== March 29 event ===
List of confirmed tornadoes – Tuesday, March 29, 2011
EF#	Location	County / Parish	State	Start Coord.	Time (UTC)	Path length	Max width
EF0	Edgard	St. John the Baptist	LA	30.0418°N 90.5399°W	22:15–22:17	0.08 mi (0.13 km)	50 yd (46 m)
EF0	A very weak tornado downed a few large tree limbs and peeled some shingles off a roof.						
EF0	Killona	St. Charles	LA	30.0217°N 90.4934°W	22:17–22:20	0.15 mi (0.24 km)	25 yd (23 m)
EF0	A vehicle had its camper top torn off and a couple tree limbs were snapped.						
EF1	Delacroix	St. Bernard	LA	29.7689°N 89.7899°W	01:02–01:06	0.6 mi (0.97 km)	25 yd (23 m)
EF1	This brief tornado impacted a vacant government complex, causing the complex to lose its top two floors and collapse the building's veneer. Five unstrapped RV trailers were flipped, two of which were rolled for 45 yd (41 m) and destroyed.						

=== March 30 event ===
List of confirmed tornadoes – Wednesday, March 30, 2011
EF#	Location	County / Parish	State	Start Coord.	Time (UTC)	Path length	Max width
EF1	S of Lake Panasoffkee to Sumterville	Sumter	FL	28.7367°N 82.0988°W	19:56–19:58	2.19 mi (3.52 km)	40 yd (37 m)
EF1	A tornado on the leading edge of a squall line snapped a few pine trees, causing some of the pine trees to block roads in Sumterville.						

=== March 31 event ===
List of confirmed tornadoes – Thursday, March 31, 2011
EF#	Location	County / Parish	State	Start Coord.	Time (UTC)	Path length	Max width
EF0	Southern Keystone to northern Citrus Park	Hillsborough	FL	28.0953°N 82.6325°W	12:27–12:30	4.29 mi (6.90 km)	30 yd (27 m)
EF0	This tornado was reported by several members of the public but no damage was reported.						
EF0	Eastern Cheval to Lutz	Hillsborough	FL	28.14°N 82.508°W	12:38–12:42	5.62 mi (9.04 km)	30 yd (27 m)
EF0	Trees and power lines were downed throughout eastern Cheval and Lutz.						
EF0	N of Socrum	Polk	FL	28.198°N 82.05°W	13:12–13:17	5.55 mi (8.93 km)	50 yd (46 m)
EF0	Multiple videos were taken of a tornado that remained over open land.						
EF1	Northern Indian Shores	Pinellas	FL	27.8716°N 82.8509°W	15:04–15:05	0.06 mi (0.097 km)	30 yd (27 m)
EF1	A waterspout moved onshore from the Gulf of Mexico, destroying the second floor of a large multiple occupancy home. Power lines and poles were snapped adjacent to the home before it quickly dissipated before crossing the Intracoastal Waterway.						
EF1	Feather Sound	Pinellas	FL	27.8983°N 82.6935°W	15:19–15:21	0.98 mi (1.58 km)	60 yd (55 m)
EF1	This tornado crossed over the southern portion of the St. Pete–Clearwater International Airport, snapping power lines, power poles and trees. The rooves of industrial buildings near the airport were also damaged, some of which had portions of them tossed along the path of the tornado.						
EF1	Southern Tampa	Hillsborough	FL	27.8766°N 82.5025°W	15:30–15:32	1.6 mi (2.6 km)	100 yd (91 m)
EF1	This tornado occurred in the Gandy-Sun Bay South and Ballast Point neighborhoods of southern Tampa, minorly damaging approximately twenty-nine residences and businesses. Six structures suffered major damage before the tornado went offshore and dissipated over Hillsborough Bay.						
EF1	WSW of Palm River-Clair Mel to northwestern Riverview	Hillsborough	FL	27.9013°N 82.4126°W	15:40–15:43	5.24 mi (8.43 km)	100 yd (91 m)
EF1	Numerous roofs were blown off and 40 ft (12 m) long storage containers were overturned around the Tampa Port Authority. Roughly one hundred eighteen homes and businesses suffered minor damage in Progress Village with another forty sustaining major damage.						
EF1	Southwestern Lakeland	Polk	FL	27.9858°N 82.0226°W	16:04–16:05	0.83 mi (1.34 km)	30 yd (27 m)
EF1	A brief tornado touched down and impacted the Lakeland Linder International Airport while the Sun 'n Fun Aerospace Expo was ongoing. Approximately fifty planes were damaged or destroyed, several of which were overturned. Five campsites were destroyed with several other campsite tents collapsed or blown down. Light towers and other ground equipment also received damage. Seven people were injured at the festival.						
EF0	Northern Mulberry to northern Bartow	Polk	FL	27.9086°N 81.9827°W	16:06–16:12	9.44 mi (15.19 km)	60 yd (55 m)
EF0	Numerous trees and powerlines were downed.						

== See also ==
- Tornadoes of 2011
- List of United States tornadoes in April 2011
