= Redding =

Redding may refer to:

== People ==
See: Redding (surname)

== Places in the United Kingdom ==
- Redding, Falkirk, a village in the Falkirk council area in central Scotland
- Reddingmuirhead, a village in Falkirk uphill from Redding, England
- Reading, Berkshire, pronounced like Redding, a historic market town in England

== Places in the United States ==
- Redding, California
- Redding, Indiana
- Redding, Iowa
- Redding Township, Jackson County, Indiana
  - Reddington, Indiana, an unincorporated town in Redding Township
- Redding Township, Michigan
- Redding, Connecticut

== Entertainment ==
- Noel Redding, English musician and bassist for the Jimi Hendrix Experience
- Otis Redding, American soul singer
- The Reddings, American band formed by Otis Redding's two sons
- The Redding Brothers, American rock and roll band from Nashville, Tennessee

== Other ==
- Redding Record Searchlight, newspaper serving Redding, California
- Redding Municipal Airport, city-owned public-use airport in Redding, California
- Redding School District, one of many school districts in Redding, California
- Redding Rage, professional women's football team based out of Redding, California
- Redding Rancheria, American Indian reservation in Shasta County, California
- Safford Unified School District v. Redding, a United States Supreme Court case concerning a strip search conducted by public school officials

== See also ==
- Redding station (disambiguation), stations of the name
- Redding Township (disambiguation)
- Reding (disambiguation)
- Reddington (disambiguation)
- Redington (disambiguation)
- Reddin
- Redden (disambiguation)
- Reading (disambiguation)
