= Redington =

Redington may refer to:

== People ==
- Amanda Redington (born 1962), British actress and TV presenter
- Bernice Orpha Redington (1891–1966), American home economics expert and journalist
- Daryll Reddington (born 1972), former New Zealand cricketer
- Frank Redington (1906–1984), English actuary
- Helen Reddington (AKA Helen McCookerybook; born c. 1950), English rock performer and author
- Ian Reddington (born 1957), English actor
- James Redington (1872–1962), Irish politician, Mayor of Galway 1959–1960
- Joe Redington (1917–1999), American dog musher and kennel owner
- Stuart Reddington (born 1978), English footballer
- Thomas Nicholas Redington (1815–1862), Irish politician and civil servant
- Zion Redington (born 2006), American wheelchair rugby player
- Tony Reddin (1919–2015), Irish former sportsperson born Martin Charles Reddington

== Places ==
- Redington, Arizona
- Reddington, Indiana
- Redington, Nebraska
- Redington Beach, Florida
- Redington Shores, Florida
- Redington Museum, historic museum in Waterville, Maine
- Redington Pass, Arizona
- Mount Redington, a mountain in Franklin County, Maine

== See also ==
- Reddington (disambiguation)
- Reding (disambiguation)
- Redding (disambiguation)
- Reddin
- Redden (disambiguation)
- Reading (disambiguation)
