= Reading (surname) =

Reading is a surname. Notable people with the surname include:

- Anya Reading, Australian geophysicist
- Arnold Reading (1896–1975), English cricketer and major-general
- Arthur Kenneth Reading (1887–1971), American politician
- Bertice Reading (1933–1991), American singer
- Brendon Reading (born 1989), Australian racewalker
- Burnet Reading (1749–1838), English engraver
- Fanny Reading (1884–1974), Jewish Australian medical practitioner
- Geoff Reading (born 1968), American drummer
- John Reading (disambiguation), several people of the name
- Kate Reading, alias of Jennifer Mendenhall (born 1960), American audiobook narrator
- Mario Reading (1953–2017), British author
- Patrick Reading (born 1999), Scottish footballer
- Peter Reading (1946–2011), English poet
- Pierson B. Reading (1816–1868), American pioneer
- Richard Reading (1882–1952), Mayor of Detroit
- Richard Reading, CdeG(B) (1876–1929), English journalist
- Robert Reading (c. 1640–c. 1689), Irish Baronet and lighthouse builder
- Tony Reading, British art director
- William Reading (1674–1744), English clergyman and librarian
- Wilma Reading, Australian singer
