= Reddin =

Reddin is both a surname and a given name. Notable people with the name include:

- Keith Reddin (born 1956), American actor and playwright
- Thomas Reddin (1916–2004), former Los Angeles police chief
- Tony Reddin (1919–2015), Irish sportsman
- William James Reddin (1930–1999), British management behavioralist and writer
- Ger Reddin (born 1988), Irish sportsperson. He plays hurling with his local club Castletown and has been a member of the Laois senior inter-county team since 2011
- Sally Reddin, paralympic athlete from Great Britain competing mainly in category F54 shot put events
- Amanda Reddin (born 1965), née Harrison, later Kirby, is a gymnastics coach, and former Olympic gymnast, for Great Britain
- Reddin Andrews (1848–1923), President of Baylor University from 1885 to 1886

== See also ==
- Redden (disambiguation)
- Redding (disambiguation)
- Reding (disambiguation)
- Redington (disambiguation)
- Reading (disambiguation)
- Redding (surname)
- Reddington (disambiguation)
