= The Physics of Immortality =

The Physics of Immortality may refer to:

- The Physics of Immortality (book), 1994 book by Frank J. Tipler
- a 2007 album by The Redding Brothers
