= Little Acre, Indiana =

- Unincorporated town
- Location within Indiana Location within the United States
- Coordinates: 39°02′10″N 85°52′58″W
- Country: United States
- State: Indiana
- County: Jackson
- Township: Redding
- Elevation: 584 ft (178 m)
- ZIP code: 47274
- FIPS code: 18-44316
- GNIS feature ID: 452457

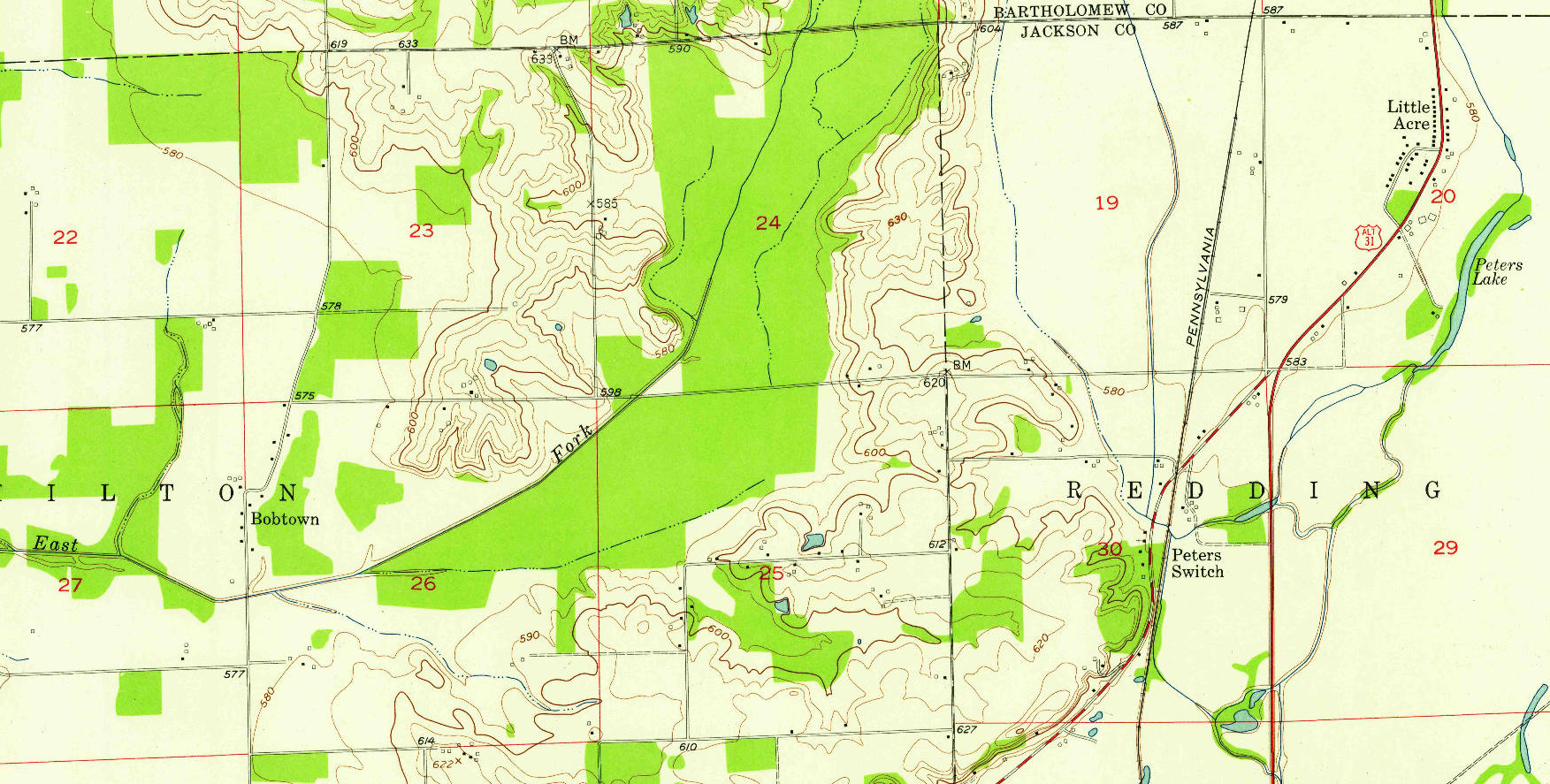
Excerpt of 1957 USGS map showing Little Acre and Bobtown in Jackson County

Little Acre is an unincorporated town in Redding Township, Jackson County, Indiana.
