= Pete Marcus =

American football player (1917–1997)

No. 18
- Position: End

Personal information
- Born: December 17, 1917; Rillton, Pennsylvania
- Died: April 20, 1997 (aged 79)

Career information
- College: Kentucky; Western Kentucky

Career history
- 1944: Washington Redskins

Peter Paul Marcus (December 17, 1917 – April 20, 1997) was an American football end in the National Football League for the Washington Redskins. He attended the University of Kentucky and Western Kentucky University.
