= Bobtown, Indiana =

- Unincorporated community
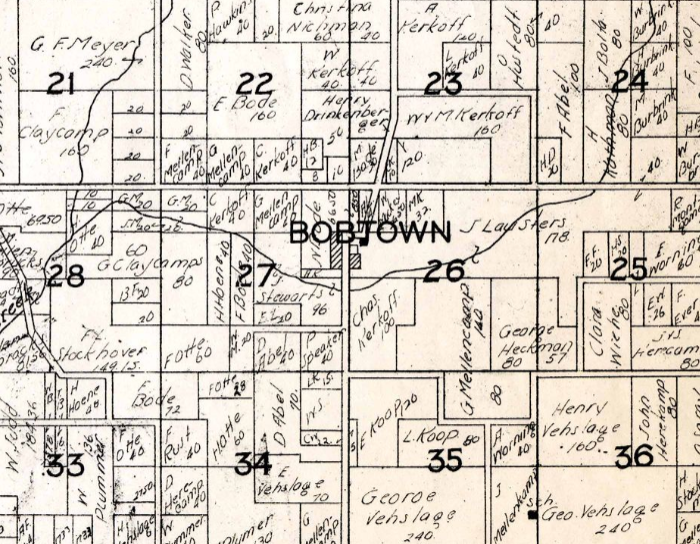
- Bobtown on Jackson County plat map circa 1920s

- Location within Indiana Location within the United States
- Coordinates: 39°01′10″N 85°56′46″W
- Country: United States
- State: Indiana
- County: Jackson
- Township: Hamilton
- Elevation: 577 ft (176 m)
- ZIP code: 47274
- FIPS code: 18-06256
- GNIS feature ID: 431275

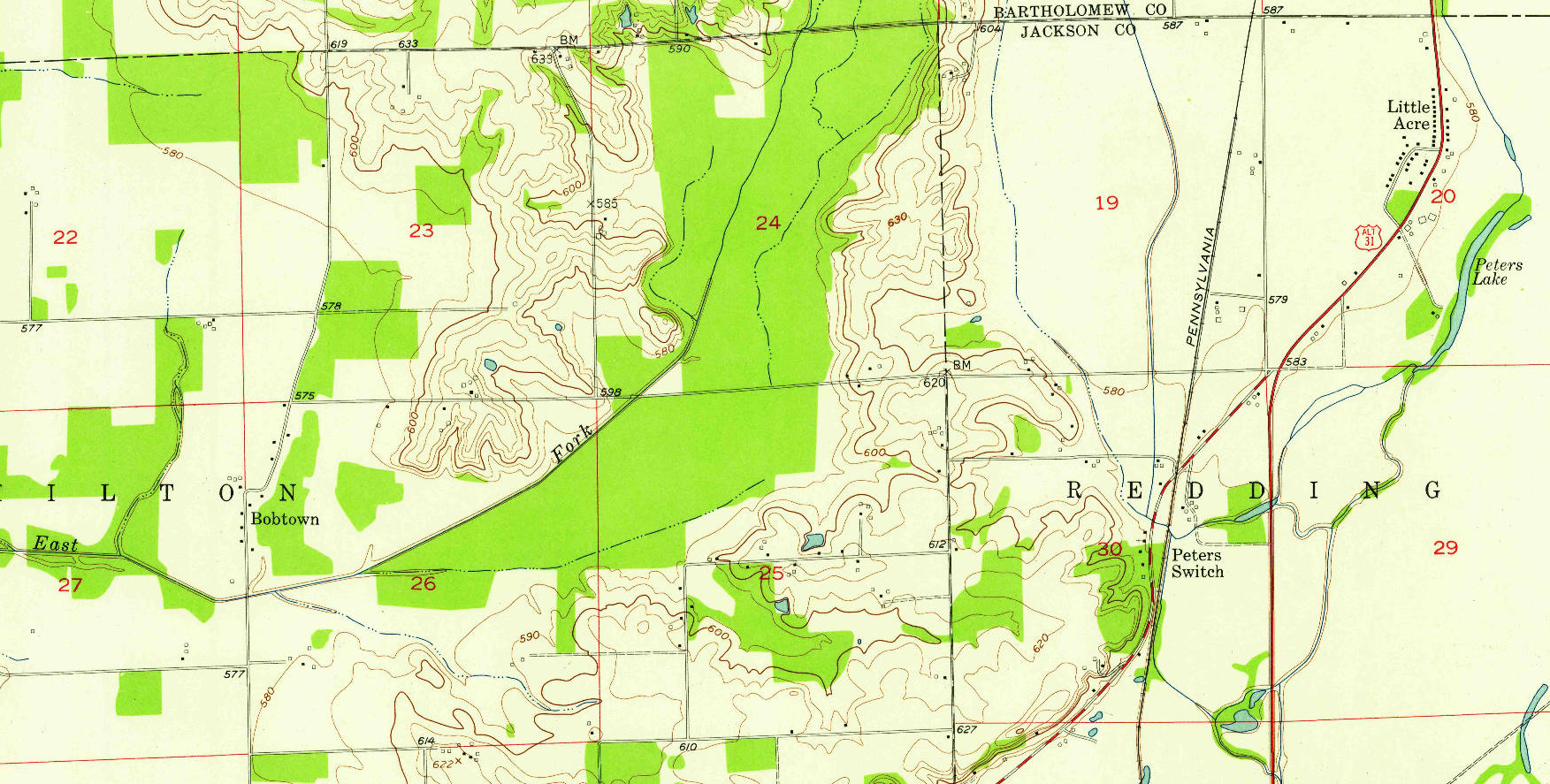
Excerpt of 1957 USGS map showing Bobtown and Little Acre in Jackson County

Bobtown is an unincorporated community in Hamilton Township, Jackson County, Indiana.

== Location and history ==
The community is located in northern Jackson County along N. County Roads 525E and 500E, about five miles northwest of Seymour, or about eight miles by road.

The community once had a school and a store, and there was also a gunshop from 1870 to 1895. The one-room schoolhouse was open from 1897 through 1939, and closed due to school consolidation. Residents in the 1990s reported that the community was named after Bob Chasteen, who owned the grocery store. Chasteen's 1926 obituary notes he ran a general store at Bobtown for 35 years, but doesn't mention whether the community was named after him.

One source describes Bobtown as likely established after 1900 because it does not appear on prior maps. A 1900 plat map of the county shows the schoolhouse and multiple smaller residential lots around it, but without a place name affixed. Local newspaper references to "Bobtown" appear as early as 1895. The community does appear on local maps as early as 1917 and USGS maps as early as 1957. It also appears on official county maps.

The working title of John Cougar Mellencamp's 1987 album The Lonesome Jubilee was named Bobtown, because his grandparents had lived there after they were married.
