= The Lonesome Jubilee =

Studio album by John Cougar Mellencamp
- Released: August 24, 1987
- Recorded: September 1986 – June 1987
- Studio: Belmont Mall (Belmont, Indiana)
- Genres: Heartland rock; garage rock
- Length: 39:42
- Label: Mercury
- Producers: John Mellencamp; Don Gehman

John Cougar Mellencamp chronology
| Scarecrow (1985) | The Lonesome Jubilee (1987) | Big Daddy (1989) |

Singles from The Lonesome Jubilee
- 1. "Paper in Fire" Released: August 1987; 2. "Cherry Bomb" Released: October 1987; 3. "Check It Out" Released: January 1988; 4. "Rooty Toot Toot" Released: May 1988

Professional ratings
Review scores
| Source | Rating |
|---|---|
| AllMusic | 4.5/5 stars |
| Robert Christgau | A− |
| Rolling Stone | (mixed) |
| The Rolling Stone Album Guide | 3.5/5 stars |

The Lonesome Jubilee is the ninth studio album by American singer-songwriter John Cougar Mellencamp (credited as simply Mellencamp on pressings). The album was released by Mercury Records on August 24, 1987 (see 1987 in music). Four singles were released from the album, the first two in 1987 and the last two in 1988.

The album was one of Mellencamp's most successful worldwide, charting in ten countries. The album was most successful in Canada where it topped RPM magazine's Top Albums chart and became the artist's highest certified album by Music Canada (formerly the Canadian Recording Industry Association) becoming 6× platinum. In The Village Voice's annual Pazz & Jop critics poll for the year's best albums, The Lonesome Jubilee finished at No. 7.

"We were on the road for a long time after Scarecrow, so we were together a lot as a band," Mellencamp said in a 1987 Creem Magazine feature. "For the first time ever, we talked about the record before we started. We had a very distinct vision of what should be happening here. At one point, The Lonesome Jubilee was supposed to be a double album, but at least 10 of the songs I'd written just didn't stick together with the idea and the sound we had in mind. So I just put those songs on a shelf, and cut it back down to a single record. Now, in the past, it was always 'Let's make it up as we go along' – and we did make some of The Lonesome Jubilee up as we went along. But we had a very clear idea of what we wanted it to sound like, even before it was written, right through to the day it was mastered."

== Background ==
On October 30, 1986 – during the period in which The Lonesome Jubilee was being recorded – Mellencamp's uncle Joe died of cancer at the age of 57, which greatly influenced the album.

While the album was being recorded, Riva Records had ceased to function, so Mellencamp moved to Mercury Records (which, like Riva, was distributed by PolyGram), which would continue to release material by Mellencamp until 1998.

The original working title of the album was Bobtown, because his grandparents had lived in that small Indiana community after they were married. The title changed as the tone of the album became more serious.

== Recording and production ==
The sessions for The Lonesome Jubilee took place at Mellencamp's Belmont Mall Studio in Belmont, Indiana from September 1986 to June 1987, a period of nine months. The sessions were produced by Mellencamp with Don Gehman and were engineered by Gehman and David Leonard.

The sound on the album was a departure from Mellencamp's previous albums and included many traditional folk and country instruments in order to make his audience aware of the "once-familiar social landscape" of folk music. The risk of making music counter to the mainstream of rock music paid off with the album's success.

== Songwriting inspirations ==
Of "The Real Life," Mellencamp told Creem magazine in 1987: "When I sing about Jackson Jackson (in 'The Real Life') – unless you know what it's like to spend your whole life or the majority of your young adulthood doing what you're supposed to do, then you can't relate to it. Because some of these young guys are thinking, 'Well, I'm doing what I want to do' – but that's not true. They're doing what they're supposed to do. Jackson Jackson is based on my Uncle Jay. He said those exact words to me one time at the Red Lobster here in Bloomington. He and his wife got a divorce. She was 14 and he was 17 when they got married – and he said, 'Man, I have done exactly what I'm supposed to my whole life. I married this girl when she was 14 – I didn't love her. We had kids. We raised the kids. I stayed there. I worked every day pouring concrete. Now I'm in my 40s, and I want to do something for myself.' And I asked, 'Well, what do you have in mind?' He said, 'I don't know.' You can't be 21, though, and relate to that. I mean, I look back on my life now – and you look back on your life – and you realize that we hardly ever really get to do what we wanted to do. Suddenly, it's 17 turns 35 – and how can someone 21 understand that?"

Mellencamp said he was inspired by his daughter Teddi Jo to write "Rooty Toot Toot": "That song was a nursery rhyme that I wrote for her. Teddi Jo said, 'Dad, how come you never use my name in one of your songs?' My youngest daughter's name is Justice, so she said 'You used Justice, and you used Michelle' – because Michelle's middle name is Suzanne – 'so I want you to write me a special song.' So I wrote 'Rooty Toot Toot' as a nursery rhyme. It didn't even have music. I showed it to Larry (Crane) and he said, 'That's a good little, uplifting story' – so we arranged it into a song and put it on the record."

== Cover art ==
The cover art for the album was photographed by Skeeter Hagler and featured Mellencamp sitting next to an older blue-collar working man. The photo shoot took place at the Midway Tavern in Elnora, Indiana. According to Casey Kasem on his American Top 40 broadcast for the week ending January 30th, 1988, Mellencamp paid $300 to rent the tavern for the photo shoot. The older working man seated next to Mellencamp at the bar is Woodrow "Woody" Baker (1914–2009), a welder recommended for the shoot by the tavern's bartender.

== Track listing ==
All songs written by John Mellencamp; "Empty Hands" was written by Mellencamp and George Green.

1. "Paper in Fire" – 3:51
2. "Down and Out in Paradise" – 3:37
3. "Check It Out" – 4:19
4. "The Real Life" – 3:57
5. "Cherry Bomb" – 4:47
6. "We Are the People" – 4:17
7. "Empty Hands" – 3:43
8. "Hard Times for an Honest Man" – 3:27
9. "Hotdogs and Hamburgers" – 4:04
10. "Rooty Toot Toot" – 3:29
11. "Blues from the Front Porch" (2005 re-issue bonus track) – 2:02

== Personnel ==
- John Mellencamp – vocal, guitar, autoharp on Cherry Bomb
- Kenny Aronoff – drums, percussion, backing vocals
- Larry Crane – guitars, mandolin, harmonica, autoharp, banjo, backing vocals
- John Cascella – accordion, keyboards, saxophone, melodica, penny whistle, claves
- Lisa Germano – fiddle
- Toby Myers – bass guitar, banjo, backing vocals; vocal on "Cherry Bomb" verse two
- Pat Peterson – backing vocals, cowbell, tambourine
- Crystal Taliefero – percussion, backing vocals; vocal on "Cherry Bomb" verse two
- Mike Wanchic – guitars, dobro, banjo, dulcimer, backing vocals; vocal on "Cherry Bomb" verse two

== Charts ==
=== Weekly charts ===
| Chart (1987) | Peak position |
|---|---|
| Australian (Kent Music Report) | 2 |
| Canadian Top Albums | 1 |
| German Albums | 41 |
| Netherlands Top 100 Albums | 24 |
| Norwegian Top 40 Albums | 16 |
| Swedish Top 60 Albums | 6 |
| Swiss Top 100 Albums | 10 |
| UK Albums Chart | 31 |
| US Billboard 200 | 6 |
| US Country Albums | 63 |

| Chart (1988) | Peak position |
|---|---|
| New Zealand Top 50 Albums | 3 |

=== Year-end charts ===
| Chart (1987) | Position |
|---|---|
| Canada Top Albums/CDs (RPM) | 9 |
| Chart (1988) | Position |
| Canada Top Albums/CDs (RPM) | 13 |
| US Billboard 200 | 14 |

== Certifications ==
Certifications for The Lonesome Jubilee
| Region | Certification | Certified units/sales |
|---|---|---|
| Australia (ARIA) | Platinum | 70,000^{^} |
| Canada (Music Canada) | 6× Platinum | 600,000^{^} |
| New Zealand (RMNZ) | Platinum | 15,000^{^} |
| Sweden (GLF) | Gold | 50,000^{^} |
| United States (RIAA) | 3× Platinum | 3,000,000^{^} |
^{^} Shipments figures based on certification alone.
