= Redding Township =

Redding Township may refer to several places in the United States:

- Redding Township, Jackson County, Indiana
- Redding Township, Clare County, Michigan

== See also ==
- Reading Township (disambiguation)
