= Marchioness of Reading =

Marchioness of Reading may refer to:

- Alice Isaacs, Marchioness of Reading (c.1866–1930), first wife of the 1st Marquess
- Stella Isaacs, Marchioness of Reading (1894–1971), second wife of the 1st Marquess
- Eva Violet Mond, Marchioness of Reading (1895–1973), wife of the 2nd Marques
- Margot Isaacs, Marchioness of Reading (1919–2015), wife of the 3rd Marquess
- Melinda Victoria Isaacs, Marchioness of Reading (fl. 1979–1986), wife of the 4th Marquess

== See also ==
- Reading (disambiguation)
