= Redding station =

Redding station may refer to:

- Redding station (California), an Amtrak station in Redding, California
- Redding (Metro-North station), a Metro-North Railroad station in Redding, Connecticut

== See also ==
- Redding (disambiguation)
- Reading station (disambiguation)
