= Reading station (disambiguation) =

Reading station or Reading railway station may refer to:

== United Kingdom ==
- Reading railway station, Reading, Berkshire, England
- Reading Green Park railway station, in Reading, Berkshire, England
- Reading Southern railway station, a former railway station in Reading, Berkshire, England
- Reading West railway station, Reading, Berkshire, England

== United States ==
=== Massachusetts ===
- Reading station (MBTA), Reading, Massachusetts

=== Pennsylvania ===
- Former Reading Railroad stations may be known as simply Reading Station:
  - Reading Depot, Reading
  - Franklin Street station (Pennsylvania), Reading
  - Lebanon station (Reading Railroad), Lebanon
  - Reading Terminal, Philadelphia
  - Pottstown station, Pottstown
  - Phoenixville station, Phoenixville
  - Royersford station, Royersford
  - Birdsboro station (Reading Railroad), Birdsboro
  - Pottsville station, Pottsville, Pennsylvania
  - Schuylkill Haven station, Schuylkill Haven

== See also ==
- Reading (disambiguation)
- Redding station (disambiguation)
- Reading Power Station, a gas-fuelled power station in Tel Aviv, Israel
- Reading power station UK, a former coal-fired power station in Reading, England
