= New Salem, Ohio =

Unincorporated community in Ohio, U.S.

Coordinates: 39°50′52″N 82°28′21″W

New Salem is an unincorporated community in Fairfield County, in the U.S. state of Ohio.

== History ==
New Salem was platted in 1832. A post office was established at New Salem in 1832, and remained in operation until 1960.
