= Richard Reading (soldier) =

British journalist

Richard Reading CdeG(B)
- Born: 1876; Lancashire, England
- Died: 16 August 1929 (aged 52–53); Melbourne, Australia
- Spouse(s): Mary Drusilla "Mollie" Reading, nee Taylor
- Relatives: George and Frederick Reading (brothers) Jenny Bagley, nee Reading (sister)
- Military career
- Branch: Belgian Army
- Rank: Corporal
- Nicknames: Dick; The Soldier-Journalist; The Fighting Editor; The Man Who Would Not Die
- Units: 3rd Belgian Lancers; Corps de Mitrailleuses ()
- Conflicts: World War I
- Awards: Croix de guerre (Belgium), Chevalier of the Order of Leopold

Richard Reading CdeG(B) (1876–1929) was an English journalist, baritone and Chevalier of the Order of Leopold.

== Early life and career ==
Richard Reading was born in Bury, Lancashire and was the son of T. Reading, of Warwickshire, England. Reading was educated in Birmingham. A well-regarded sports journalist, Reading rose to prominence writing for Manchester's "Sporting Chronicle", acted as the sporting editor for Manchester's "Daily Sketch" and was president of the Manchester Press Club. Reading was a friend and contemporary of the war correspondent Sir Basil Clarke and became the subject of Clarke's first important correspondence from the front.

== Belgian service and the First World War ==
At the outbreak of the First World War, the British army rejected Reading because he was over its age limit. Undeterred, Reading as part of the Manchester Troop of the Legion of Frontiersmen travelled to Belgium. There he initially enlisted with the 3rd Belgian Lancers in the early stages of the war and was soon promoted to the rank of corporal. He transferred to a Minerva Armored Car unit, the Corps de Mitrailleuses () under Count Pierre de Lunden, that was active at both the Belgian and French Fronts. It was Reading's actions in this capacity that saw him awarded the Belgian Croix de Guerre and made a Chevalier of the Order of Leopold. An account of his heroism follows.

Reading had been on a scouting expedition with his armoured car unit when he identified an advance guard of the German army. The Germans had set up an ambush and opened fire. Reading was able to warn the other four men of the unit, instructing them to save themselves and the armoured car and not to worry about him. Under gunfire, the car moved off at speed. For a quarter of a mile, the occupants were unaware that Reading had grasped on to the back of the car and was being dragged. Reading had been shot in both legs by German expanding bullets and had also sustained significant injuries from being dragged at speed. Despite his wounds, he was described by a nurse as coming "in on a stretcher bright as a button, smoking a cigar and laughing". Reading required multiple surgeries and spent two years at Worsley New Hall convalescing from the wounds he sustained in this skirmish that left him needing the aid of crutches to walk. Reading's casual bravado "encapsulated the spirit of adventure-seeking that was typical of the attitudes of many Britons during the early part of the war".

== Post-war life ==
Following his recuperation, Reading sailed to Australia on the P & O Line's "Mongolia" to join his two brothers George and Frederick in Bangalow, New South Wales. During the sea journey, the "Mongolia" struck a German mine and sank off the coast of Mumbai (then called Bombay) in 1917 with the loss of 23 lives. Reading, badly injured by shrapnel from the explosion, survived the sinking. A cabin mate rescued him before the ship sank. There are reports of an extended time at sea before the survivors reached land. Reading was then carried on a stretcher by locals to the closest township and was further hospitalized for 6 months in Bombay. His survival had achieved some notoriety seeing Reading dubbed "The Man Who Would Not Die".

On his eventual arrival in Australia, Reading initially settled in Brunswick Heads, New South Wales. Reading worked in oyster culture in the region for 5 years. During this time, he married Mary Drusilla Taylor on 8 July 1920 at the Church of St Mary Ballina. Taylor was the daughter of the late Thomas Taylor; a grazier of Graham's Valley, Glencoe and was matron of Byron Hospital, Bangalow. Taylor had been a nurse in Belgium during the war. Reading contributed to the community in the area. He organised local sporting events, wrote occasional newspaper articles under the moniker "Chev" and compiled a local publication on Brunswick Heads. Reading rekindled his singing and was a popular baritone participating in the local social and cultural life. He performed for patriotic and charitable concerts in the Richmond River district and successfully competed in local eisteddfodau in Armidale, New South Wales and Queensland.

Following medical advice, Reading ceased oyster cultivation. Reading and his wife left for Melbourne when he gained a position as sub-editor for the sporting section of The Herald. He worked there for approximately 18 months until shortly before his death in 1929 aged 53. He maintained his interest in singing as a member of the St Paul's Cathedral Choir. The Choir paid special tribute to Reading during his memorial service, draping his seat with both the Union Jack and the Belgian Flag. A Belgian wreath was placed on his coffin by Rev. R. Sherwood, Precentor of St. Paul's, for the Belgian Consul General "as a token of gratitude from the Belgian nation for a gallant and brave soldier ". Sir Basil Clarke wrote an obituary that was published both in the London "Daily News" and the "Northern Star", Lismore, NSW. On 22 September 1929, in accordance with his last wishes, Reading's ashes were scattered three-quarters of a mile off the breakwater of the Richmond River near to Reading's Bay by Captain Upward of the "Milora". During the Independence Centenary commemoration in Brussels in 1930, his widow was presented to the King and Queen of Belgium. In 1940 Byron Shire Council accepted, from the estate of Reading's widow, a legacy of £100 together with the Reading's property "Calgarth" at Brunswick Heads. She had left the legacy for the creation of a bird sanctuary and memorial to her late husband. The council later sold the asset.

== Bibliography ==
- Family Notices. Northern Star (Lismore, NSW : 1876 - 1954) Saturday 17 July 1920 p 2 Family Notices
- Obituary: Mr. Richard Reading. Northern Star (Lismore, NSW : 1876 - 1954) Monday 9 September 1929 p 8 Article Illustrated
- Mr. Richard Reading. Northern Star (Lismore, NSW : 1876 - 1954) Saturday 17 August 1929 p 8 Article
- Sportsman and Hero. The Late Richard Reading. Glen Innes Examiner (NSW : 1908 - 1954) Saturday 26 July 1930 p 4 Article
- Sportsman and Hero. The Late Richard Reading. Well Known in Armidale. Widow Honoured by Belgian King. The Armidale Express and New England General Advertiser (NSW : 1856 - 1861; 1863 - 1889; 1891 - 1954) Friday 1 August 1930 p 3 Article
- Brunswick Heads: The pearl of the Pacific. John Sands Ltd, Sydney. (1922) Reproduced as facsimile edition Brunswick Heads: The pearl of the Pacific. (Facsimile ed.). (1995). Eureka, N.S.W.: North Coast Maps & Guides.
- Evans, Richard (2013). From the Frontline: The Extraordinary Life of Sir Basil Clarke. The History Press. ISBN 978-0752497273.
- Clarke, Basil (1917). My Round of the War. Heinemann.
- MacNaughtan, Sarah (1919). My War Experiences in Two Continents. John Murray.
- Dick Reading - "He Would Not Die": Sir Basil Clarke's Story Northern Star (Lismore, NSW : 1876 - 1954) Wednesday 25 December 1929 p 2
- Pocock, Geoffrey (2004). One Hundred Years of the Legion of Frontiersmen. Phillimore. ISBN 978-1-86077-282-5.
- World War 1 Nurse (1918). A war nurse's diary: sketches from a Belgian field hospital. MacMillan.
- Souttar, Sir Henry Sessions (1915). A surgeon in Belgium. Arnold.
- Gilliat, Richard (2010). The Wolf: How One German Raider Terrorized the Allies in the Most Epic Voyage of WWI. Simon & Schuster.
