= The Reading (Fantin-Latour, Lisbon) =

Painting by Henri Fantin-Latour

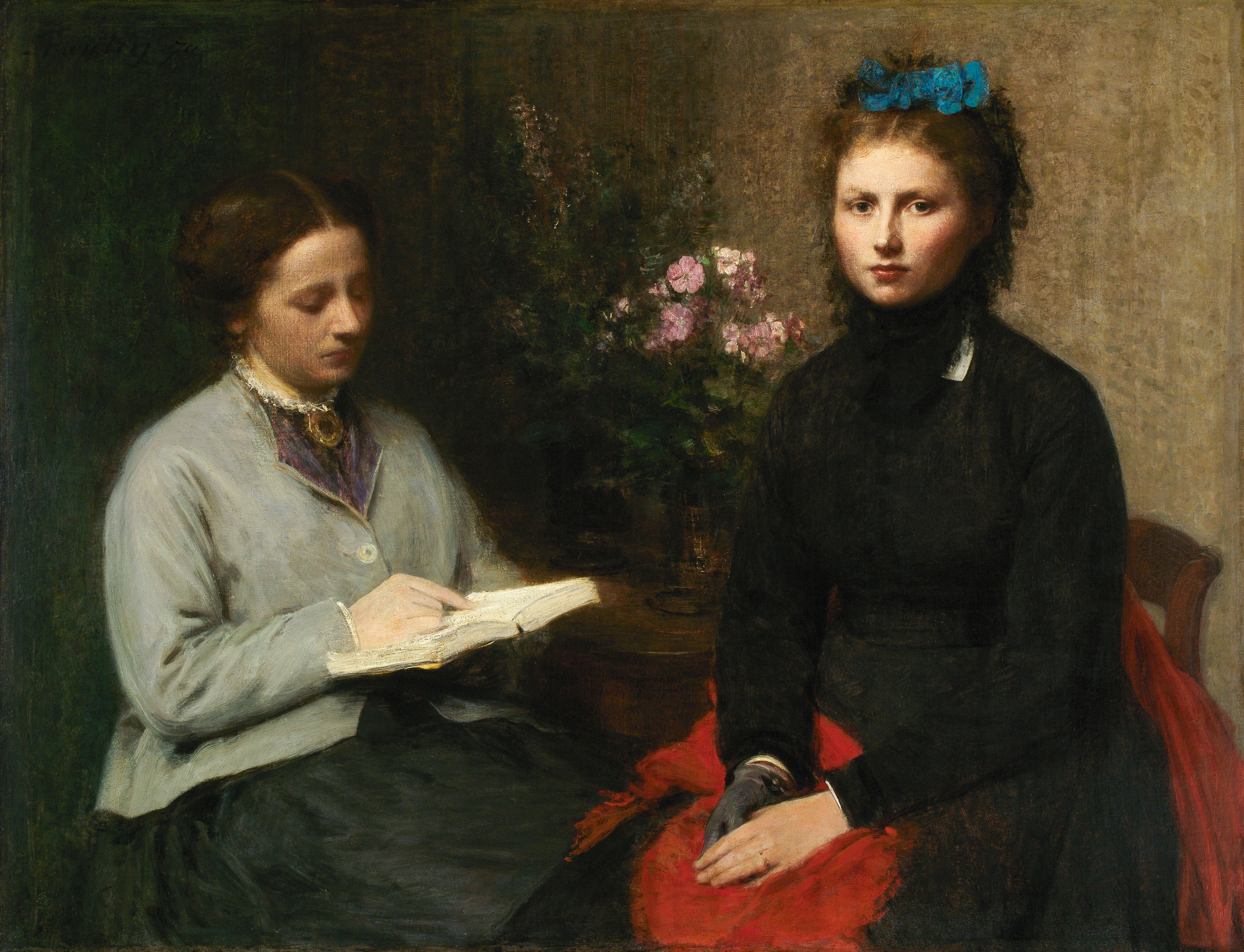
- Artist: Henri Fantin-Latour
- Year: 1870
- Medium: oil on canvas
- Dimensions: 95 cm × 123 cm (37 in × 48 in)
- Location: Museu Calouste Gulbenkian, Lisbon

The Reading is an oil-on-canvas painting by the French painter Henri Fantin-Latour, created in 1870. It is held at the Museu Calouste Gulbenkian, in Lisbon.

== History and description ==
The theme of reading was the subject of several paintings by the artist, thus representing an important role in his work. The painter chose for models Victoria Dubourg, also an artist and his future wife, who sits on the left of the canvas with her hand following her reading on a book, and her sister, Charlotte Dubourg. Between both sisters stands on a table a vase of flowers. On the right, the enigmatic figure of Charlotte stares intently at the viewer. This appears often in the painter's works, and it has led to the speculation of a "silent complicity" between the two.

The painting is a superb example of the talent of Fantin-Latour in the representation of intimate spaces, in a sober style, with a realistic outlook, and revealing to the observer his preferred universe, a silent, poetic and dreamy environment, with vaguely melancholic outlines.

A significant aspect of the composition is the inner isolation that appears to distance the two sisters, despite their proximity. The contrast between the illuminated surface and the darkest area of the painting, where the two women are positioned, accentuates the ambiguity that the viewer can feel between proximity and distance, giving the scene the suggestion of a contained opposition, also shown in other of the artist paintings.

== Provenance ==
The painting belonged to Charles E. Haviland, then to art dealer Paul Durand-Ruel, who acquired it in Paris, in 1917, having been subsequently bought by the Armenian-British collector Calouste Gulbenkian in December 1917. It is held currently at the Museu Calouste Gulbenkian, in Lisbon.
