= Aaron, Georgia =

Unincorporated community in Georgia, U.S.

Coordinates: 32°34′06″N 81°59′32″W

Aaron is an unincorporated community in Bulloch County, in the U.S. state of Georgia. It is located at an elevation of 266 feet.

== History ==
A post office called Aaron was established in 1909, and remained in operation until 1920. The community was named after Aaron, a figure in the Hebrew Bible.
