= John Reading =

John Reading may refer to:

- John Reading (clergyman) (1588–1667), English Calvinist and Biblical commentator.
- John Reading (composer, died 1692) (c. 1645 – 1692), composer and organist, father of
- John Reading (copyist) (c. 1685 – 1764), copyist, composer, and organist
- Colonel John Reading (d. 1717), father of Governor John Reading (New Jersey governor)
- John Reading (New Jersey governor) (1686–1767), Acting Colonial Governor of New Jersey, 1747–48, 1757–58
- John Roberts Reading (1826–1886), U.S. Representative from Pennsylvania
- John H. Reading (1917–2003), Mayor of Oakland, California 1966–1977

== See also ==
- John of Reading (d. 1346), scholastic philosopher
