= Reding =

Reding or Redyng may refer to:

== People ==
- Alois von Reding (1765–1818), Swiss military officer and politician who led an early revolt against the Helvetic Republic
- Augustine Reding (1625–1692), Swiss Benedictine, Prince-Abbot of Einsiedeln, and theological writer
- Henry Redyng, Member of Parliament for Wallingford (UK Parliament constituency) in 1362
- Ital Reding the Elder (c. 1370–1447), Swiss military leader and politician
- Jaclyn Reding (born 1966), American romance novelist
- Janine Reding (1920–2015), Belgian pianist and pedagogue
- John R. Reding (1805–1892), American politician
- Jörg Alois Reding (born 1951), Swiss former ambassador to Korea
- Karl Josef Reding (1713–1761), Swiss officer in Spanish service
- Leo J. Reding (1924–2015), American politician
- Nick Reding (actor) (born 1962), British actor
- Nick Reding (journalist), American journalist
- Paul Francis Reding (1924–1983), Canadian Catholic prelate and Bishop of Hamilton
- Roy Reding (born 1965), Luxembourgish lawyer and politician
- Serge Reding (1941–1975), Belgian weightlifter
- Theodor von Reding (1755–1809), Swiss mercenary general in the Spanish army during the Napoleonic Wars and governor of Málaga
- Thomas Redyng (died 1537), one of the Carthusian Martyrs
- Viviane Reding (born 1951), Luxembourgish politician

== Other uses ==
- Réding, a commune in France
- 3rd Swiss Regiment Reding, an 18th-century Swiss unit in the Spanish Army
- Bishop Reding Catholic Secondary School, Milton, Ontario, Canada

== See also ==
- Reding Fountain, Málaga, Spain
- Redings Mill, Missouri
- Redding (disambiguation)
- The Reddings, a 1980s American funk, soul and disco band
- Reddin
- Redden (disambiguation)
- Reading (disambiguation)
