= Rillton, Pennsylvania =

Unincorporated community in Pennsylvania, US

- Unincorporated community
- Location within Pennsylvania
- Coordinates: 40°17′21″N 79°43′52″W
- Country: United States
- State: Pennsylvania
- County: Westmoreland
- Elevation: 1,106 ft (337 m)
- Time zone: UTC-5 (Eastern (EST))
  - Summer (DST): UTC-4 (EDT)
- ZIP code: 15678
- Area code: 724
- GNIS feature ID: 1185086

Rillton is an unincorporated community in Westmoreland County, Pennsylvania, United States. The community is 2.9 miles (4.7 km) southwest of Irwin. Rillton has a post office, with ZIP code 15678.

== Demographics ==
The population of Rillton is 549. The population density is 958 inhabitants per square kilometer. The median age at Rillton is 33.8 years, the American median age is 37.4 years. The number of people per household in Rillton is 2.1, the American average of people per household is 2.6.

== Notable person ==
- Pete Marcus, American football player.
