= Redden =

Redden may refer to:

== People with the surname ==
- Barry Redden (b. 1960), American football player
- Billy Redden (b. 1956), American actor in Deliverance
- Chrissy Redden (born 1966), Canadian Olympic cyclist
- Jack Redden (born 1990), Australian rules football player
- James A. Redden (1929–2020), U.S. District Court Judge
- Jarrad Redden (born 1990), Australian rules football player
- Monroe Minor Redden (1901–1987), U.S. Congressman
- Wade Redden (b. 1977), Canadian ice hockey player

== Places ==
- Redden, Oklahoma, United States
- Redden a village in Somerset, UK

== See also ==
- Reddin
- Redding (disambiguation)
- Reding (disambiguation)
- Redington (disambiguation)
- Reading (disambiguation)
