= Reding Fountain =

Historic fountain in Málaga, Spain

- Fuente de Reding (Spanish)
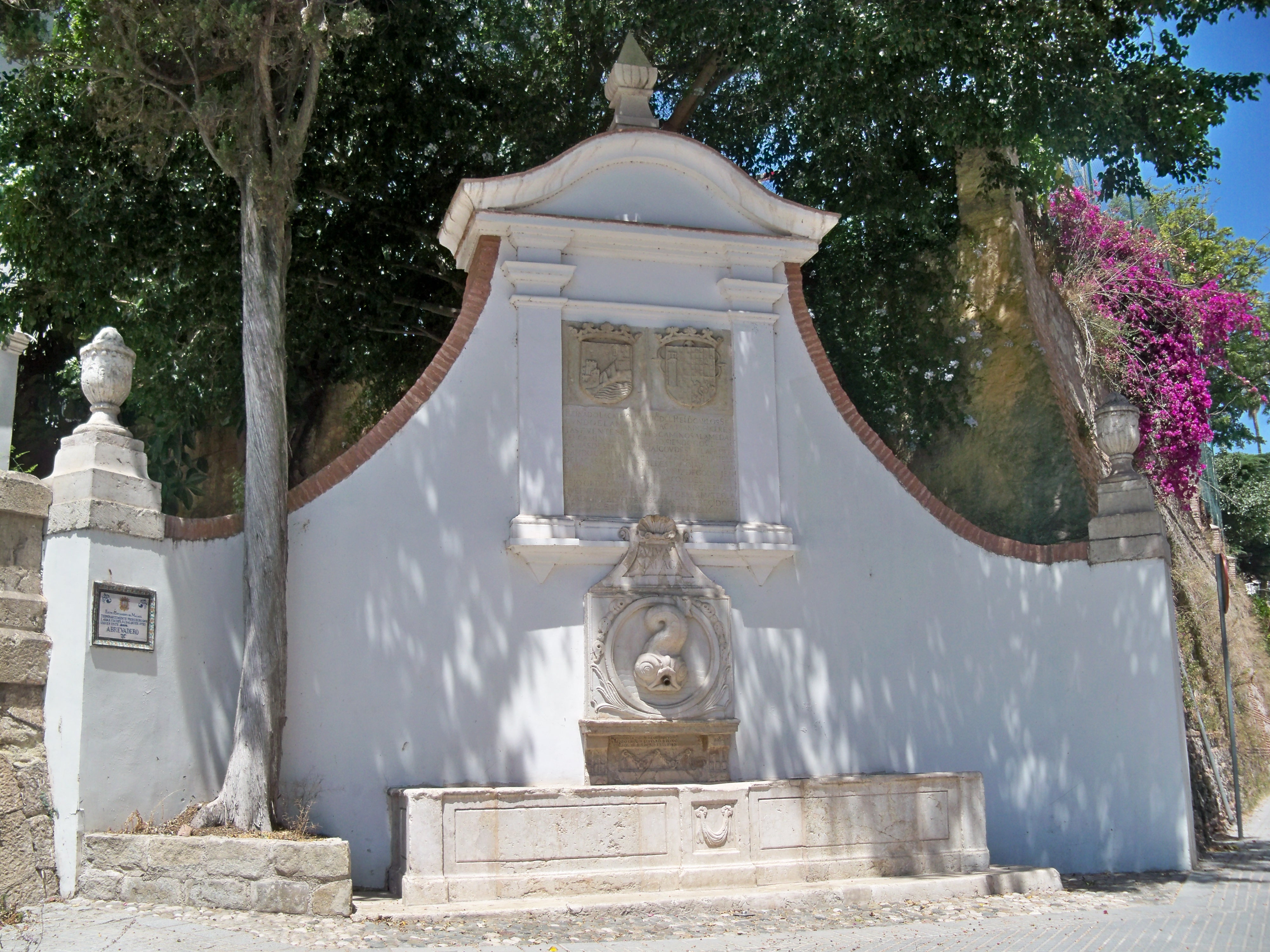
- The Reding Fountain today (2020).
- Year: 1675
- Medium: Marble, alabaster
- Location: Málaga; 36°43′17.41″N 4°24′19.22″W
- Owner: Málaga City Council

The Reding Fountain is a historic 17th-century fountain located in the Andalusian city of Málaga, Spain.

It has been reproduced countless times by local painters. It is located at one end of the Príes Avenue and pipes spring water from the Mount Gibralfaro.

== Description ==
This is a watering hole fountain built in marble and attached to a gable between pilasters that give it a monumental appearance.

In the lower part, above the basin, it has an imaginary fish-shaped figurehead surrounded by edges and borders, from the mouth of which the only spout of the fountain pours. Above this figurehead there is a marble plaque with an inscription relating to the reform of paths that gave rise to the current Paseo de Reding, as well as the date of completion of the work. Between the basin and the figurehead there is an inscription relating to the construction of the Paseo de Reding itself and the restoration of the fountain in times of Theodor von Reding.

At the top, on the marble plaque, there are two alabaster coats of arms with the city's and Marquis of Villafiel's coats of arms, Fernando Carrillo and Manuel. The set is completed with a moulded basin whose centre is decorated with a hanging festoon.

== History ==
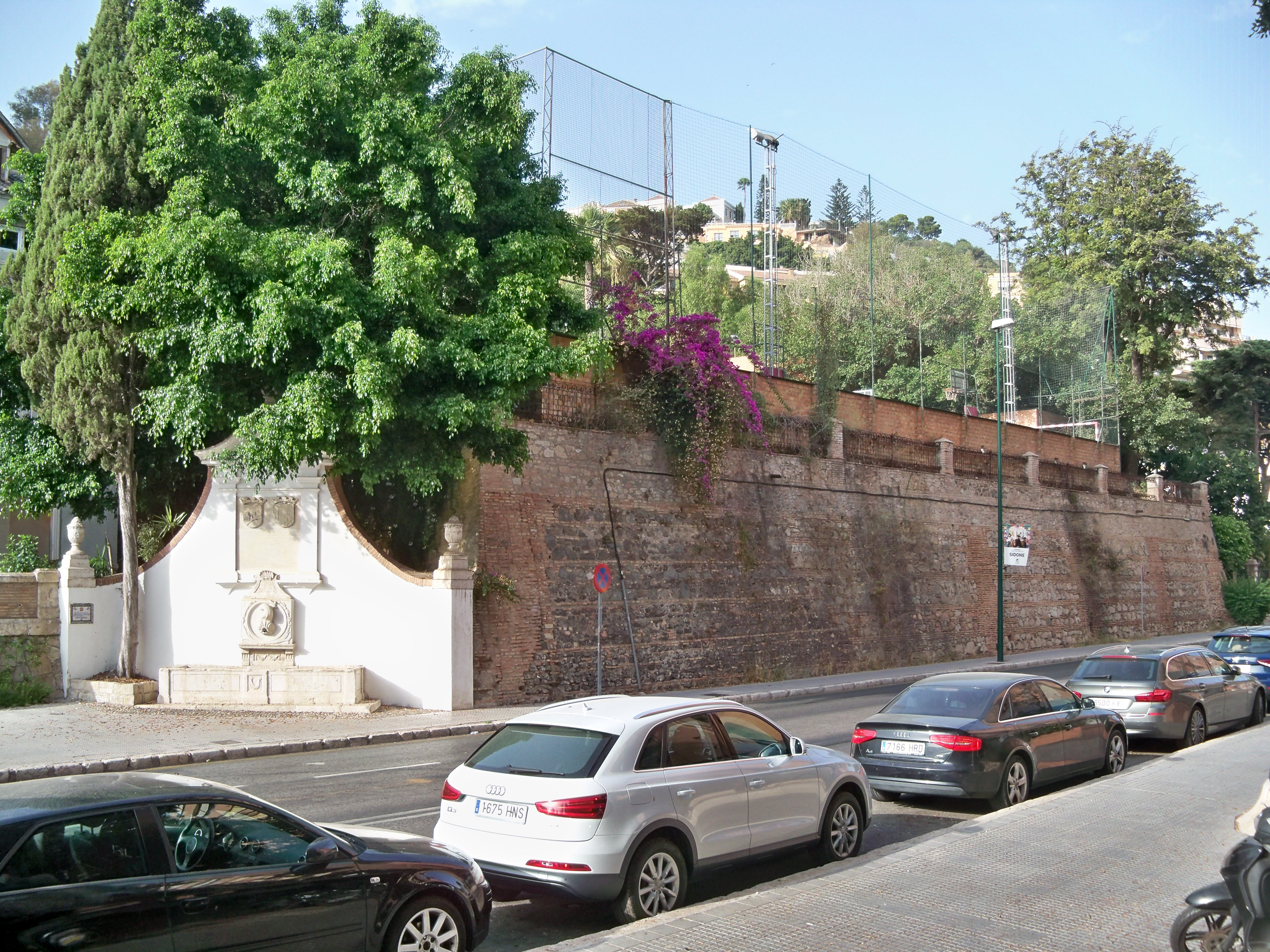
View of the Reding Fountain next to the retaining wall of the former Giró Estate.

It was ordered to be built by the mayor of the city, Fernando Carrillo y Manuel, Marquis of Villafiel. The fountain was part of the set of works to improve the road from Vélez-Málaga, which were completed on 8 February 1675.

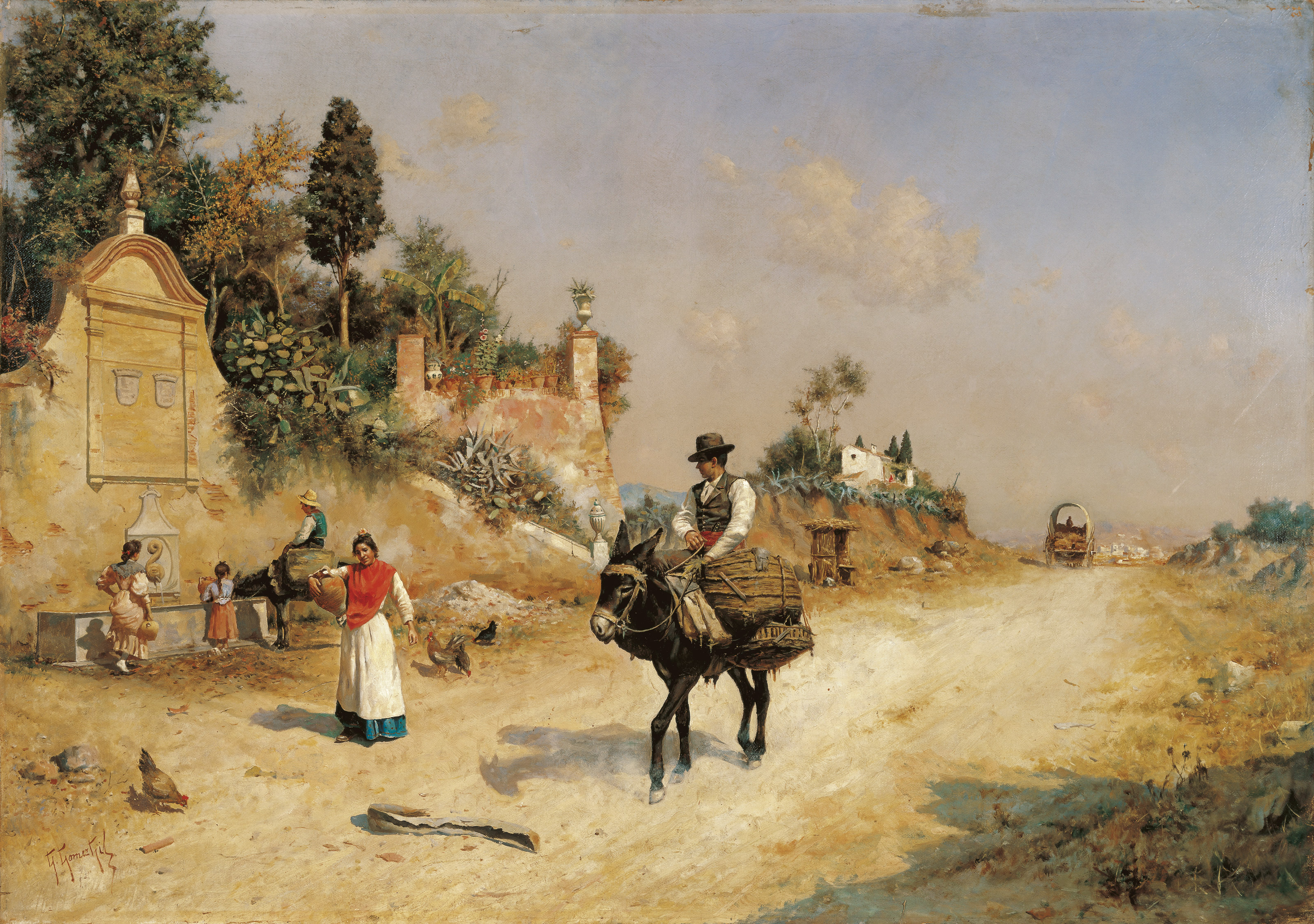
Reding Fountain, 1885. Oil on canvas by Guillermo Gómez Gil, conserved in the Carmen Thyssen Museum.

In 1806, with Theodor von Reding as mayor of Malaga, it was restored to its current appearance and its current name, in honour of the mayor. From this restoration came the basin and the fish figurehead that the fountain has today. In 1841, the Muriel Estate, whose land surrounded the Reding Fountain, was acquired by the industrialist Juan Giró to build his residence, the Giró Estate, of which only the retaining wall next to the Reding Fountain remains.

It was restored again in 2017 to resolve a series of damages to its architecture, recovering its original structure.
