= Reading Township =

Reading Township may refer to:

- Reading Township, Livingston County, Illinois
- Reading Township, Calhoun County, Iowa
- Reading Township, Sioux County, Iowa, in Sioux County, Iowa
- Reading Township, Lyon County, Kansas, in Lyon County, Kansas
- Reading Township, Hillsdale County, Michigan
- Reading Township, Butler County, Nebraska
- Reading Township, Hamilton County, Ohio, a paper township formed by the city of Reading
- Reading Township, Perry County, Ohio
- Reading Township, Pennsylvania

== See also ==
- Redding Township (disambiguation)
