= Stuart Reddington =

English footballer

Personal information
- Full name: Stuart Reddington
- Date of birth: 21 February 1978 (age 48)
- Place of birth: Lincoln, England
- Height: 6 ft 4 in (1.93 m)
- Position: Defender

Team information
- Current team: Lincoln United (Chairman)

Youth career
- Lincoln United

Senior career*
Years	Team	Apps	(Gls)
1997–1999	Lincoln United		
1999–2001	Chelsea	0	(0)
2000	→ Kalmar FF (loan)	16	(4)
2001	→ Mansfield Town (loan)	9	(0)
2001–2002	Mansfield Town	45	(1)
2002	→ Burton Albion (loan)	5	(1)
2002–2003	Burton Albion	20	(2)
2003–2004	Gainsborough Trinity		
2004–2005	Grantham Town		
2005–2006	Lincoln United		
2006–2007	Grantham Town		
2008–2009	Ruston Sports		
2009–2010	Lincoln United		
2010	Ruston Sports		
2010–2015	Lincoln United		
2015	→ Sleaford Town (loan)		
- * Club domestic league appearances and goals as of 01:57, 23 December 2008 (UTC)

Stuart Reddington (born 21 February 1978) is an English football coach and former professional footballer who is the chairman of Lincoln United.

He played as a defender and was notably contracted to Premier League side Chelsea, but failed to make a first team experience but spent time on loan with Kalmar FF and Mansfield Town. He then joined Mansfield permanently where he played in the Football League before moving into Non-League football with Burton Albion, Gainsborough Trinity, Grantham Town, Ruston Sports FC and Sleaford Town. He finished his career where he started, with Lincoln United, where he had four separate spells during his career.

== Playing career ==
Reddington started his football career aged 19, playing for his local non league side Lincoln United. While playing for the club, he was scouted by Premiership giants Chelsea where he signed for the club at the start of the 1999–2000 season. The club at the time were managed by Gianluca Vialli. While at Stamford Bridge Vialli loaned Reddington out to Swedish club Kalmar FF. While in Sweden he scored four times in sixteen appearances.

In 2001, Reddington signed for Mansfield Town following an initial loan spell at Field Mill. He remained at Mansfield until a year later when Nigel Clough signed him for Burton Albion also following a loan spell. Since leaving Burton in 2003, Reddington has played for Gainsborough Trinity, Grantham Town and his former club Lincoln United.

Reddington announced his retirement from competitive football midway through the 2007–08 season while playing for Grantham. He signed for amateur side Ruston Sports at the start of the 2008–09 campaign, playing in the Lincolnshire League. At the start of the 2009–10 season, it was announced that Reddington would re-sign for Lincoln United. He returned to Ruston Sports before rejoining Lincoln United in October 2010 and debuting in the 0-0 FA Trophy draw at Northwich Victoria. In February 2015, he joined Sleaford Town on a month's loan but was sent off for two yellow cards in the club's 2–0 home defeat to Wisbech Town on 10 February.

== Coaching career ==
In 2017 Reddington was appointed as assistant manager of Lincoln United, although he left the role in 2018 he was re-appointed in 2020.

On 26 July 2024, Reddington was appointed chairman at Lincoln United.
