= Reading, Missouri =

Unincorporated community in Missouri, United States

Coordinates: 39°29′29″N 91°07′57″W

Reading is an extinct town in Pike County, in the U.S. state of Missouri. The GNIS classifies it as a populated place.

A post office called Reading was established in 1868, and remained in operation until 1901. The community has the name of William Reading, a pioneer settler.
