= Reading (disambiguation) =

Reading is the process of decoding symbols to derive meaning.

Reading also commonly refers to Reading, Berkshire, a town in England.

The common noun or verb reading (pronounced as /ˈriːdɪŋ/) or the proper noun Reading (pronounced as /ˈrɛdɪŋ/) may also refer to:

== Common noun or verb ==
- Literary and colloquial readings of Chinese characters
  - Readings of kanji in Japanese
- Reading (computer), an action performed by computers, to acquire data from a source
- Reading (legislature), the mechanism by which a bill is introduced to a legislature
- Divination, gaining insight through interpretation of omens or supernatural indicators
- Psychic reading, an attempt to discern information through clairvoyance
- Dramatic reading, a dramatic art, also known as oral interpretation and interpretive reading
- Aesthetic interpretation, an explanation of the meaning of a work of art

== Arts and entertainment ==
- The Reading (Fantin-Latour, Lisbon), an 1870 painting by Henri Fantin-Latour
- The Reading (Fantin-Latour, Lyon), an 1877 painting by Henri Fantin-Latour
- The Reading (Manet), a c. 1865–1873 painting by Édouard Manet
- The Reading (film), a 2023 American horror film

== Businesses and organisations ==
- Reading School, a British grammar school
- University of Reading, a British university
- Reading Power Station, in Tel Aviv, Israel
- Reading Works, a former factory in Pennsylvania, U.S.
- Reading Company, also called Reading Railroad and Reading Lines, an American company

== Events ==
- Battle of Reading (871)
- Battle of Reading (1688)
- Siege of Reading (1642–1643)
- Reading and Leeds Festivals

== People ==
- Reading (surname)
- John of Reading (died 1346), theologian
- Marquess of Reading, a title in peerage of the UK since 1926, including Earl of Reading, Baron Reading, Viscount Reading
  - Marchioness of Reading (disambiguation), wife of the Marquess
- Bishop of Reading, Anglican suffragan bishop in Diocese of Oxford since 1889

== Places ==
=== United Kingdom ===
- Reading, Berkshire
  - Reading/Wokingham Urban Area, area defined by the UK Office for National Statistics
  - Reading (UK Parliament constituency) (1295–1950 and 1955–1974)
  - Reading Central (UK Parliament constituency) (created 2024)
  - Reading East (UK Parliament constituency) (1983–2024)
  - Reading North (UK Parliament constituency) (1950–1955 and 1974–1983)
  - Reading South (UK Parliament constituency) (1950–1955 and 1974–1983)
  - Reading West (UK Parliament constituency) (1983–2024)
  - Reading West and Mid Berkshire (UK Parliament constituency) (created 2024)
  - HM Prison Reading, in Reading, Berkshire, England

=== United States ===
- Reading, Kansas
- Reading, Massachusetts
- Reading, Michigan
- Reading, Minnesota
- Reading, Missouri
- Reading, New York
- Reading, Ohio, a city in Hamilton County
- Reading, Columbiana County, Ohio
- Reading, Pennsylvania
- Reading, Vermont
- North Reading, Massachusetts
- Port Reading, New Jersey
- Reading Township (disambiguation)
- West Reading, Pennsylvania

=== Jamaica ===
- Reading, Jamaica

== Ships ==
- HMS Reading (G71), a Royal Navy destroyer ship formerly USS Bailey
- USS Reading, a U.S. Navy frigate

== Sport ==
- Reading F.C., an English football club
- Reading City F.C., an English football club
- Reading Hockey Club, an English field hockey club
- Reading R.F.C., an English rugby team
- Reading Racers, an English speedway team
- Reading Town F.C., a defunct English football club
- Reading Fightin Phils, an American baseball team
- Reading United AC, an American soccer club
- Reading (United States Baseball League), a 1912 team

== See also ==
- Baron Astley of Reading, a title in peerage of England (1644–1688)
- Learning to read
- Measurement
- Read (disambiguation)
- Reading station (disambiguation)
- Readings (bookstore)
- Redding (disambiguation)
