= Redding Township, Jackson County, Indiana =

Redding Township
- Township
- Location in Jackson County
- Coordinates: 39°00′30″N 85°50′59″W
- Country: United States
- State: Indiana
- County: Jackson

Government
  - Type: Indiana township

Area
  - Total: 34.61 sq mi (89.6 km^{2})
  - Land: 34.06 sq mi (88.2 km^{2})
  - Water: 0.55 sq mi (1.4 km^{2}) 1.59%
- Elevation: 646 ft (197 m)

Population (2020)
  - Total: 5,211
  - Density: 153.0/sq mi (59.07/km^{2})
- GNIS feature ID: 0453784

Redding Township is one of twelve townships in Jackson County, Indiana, United States. As of the 2020 census, its population was 5,211 and it contained 2,143 housing units.

Historical population
Census	Pop.	Note	%±
1890	1,423		—
1900	1,577		10.8%
1910	1,533		−2.8%
1920	1,374		−10.4%
1930	1,456		6.0%
1940	1,607		10.4%
1950	1,944		21.0%
1960	2,661		36.9%
1970	3,557		33.7%
1980	3,786		6.4%
1990	3,758		−0.7%
2000	4,002		6.5%
2010	4,233		5.8%
2020	5,211		23.1%
Source: US Decennial Census

== Geography ==
According to the 2010 census, the township has a total area of 34.61 square miles (89.6 km^{2}), of which 34.06 square miles (88.2 km^{2}) (or 98.41%) is land and 0.55 square miles (1.4 km^{2}) (or 1.59%) is water. Lakes in this township include Peters Lake. The streams of Sand Creek and Thompson Slough run through this township.

=== Cities and towns ===
- Seymour (northeast edge)

=== Unincorporated towns ===
- Little Acre
- Reddington
- Rockford

=== Extinct towns ===
- Conologue
- Peters Switch

=== Adjacent townships ===
- Sand Creek Township, Bartholomew County (north)
- Geneva Township, Jennings County (northeast)
- Spencer Township, Jennings County (east)
- Jackson Township (south)
- Hamilton Township (west)
- Wayne Township, Bartholomew County (northwest)

=== Cemeteries ===
The township contains two cemeteries: Glasson and Riverview.

=== Major highways ===
- Interstate 65
- U.S. Route 31
- State Road 11
