= The Redding Brothers =

American indie rock band

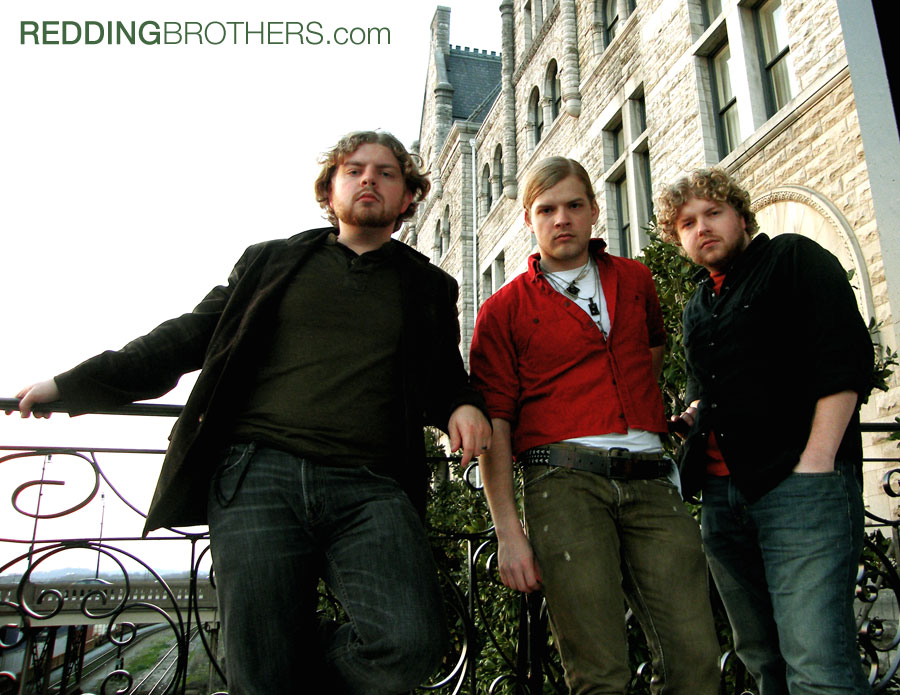
- The Redding Brothers at Union Station, Nashville, TN

Background information
- Also known as: Redding Brothers, Redding Bros.
- Origin: Charleston, West Virginia
- Genres: Pop rock; Indie rock; Alt Rock; Christian rock; Rock music; Rock & Roll
- Years active: 2003–present
- Labels: Brick & Stone Records
- Members: Lawrence Micah Redding; Josiah Monroe Redding; Gabriel Micaiah Redding
- Website: http://www.reddingbrothers.com

The Redding Brothers are an indie rock trio from Nashville, Tennessee composed of brothers Micah (b. November 1981 in Charleston, West Virginia), Josiah (b. August 1983 in Charleston, West Virginia), and Gabriel (b. February 1987 in Seattle, Washington) Redding The band is most known for their "Song of the Week" program in which the band members wrote, recorded, and released one new song each Saturday night at midnight for a complete year.

Since their inception, the band has produced 2 studio albums (a third is in progress), 4 EPs, and 2 singles, in addition to their 52 “songs of the week” (released progressively in digital-only format across 4 volumes). They have toured relentlessly since late 2003, having performed well over 320 dates as of this writing. The band performs mainly on the college and military circuits, and has toured all over North America, Southwest Asia, and parts of Africa.

The brothers are sons of Church of Christ minister Lawrence Redding, are all vegetarians, passively promote libertarian politics, and regularly delve into the philosophical in their music, lyrics, and album titles.

Their songs have been televised on NBC's WTAP-TV 5 and CBS's WOWK-TV 13 as well as heard on many radio stations including "The Cutting Edge" WMUL-FM 88.1, "Electric" WVSR-FM 102.7, "ZRock" WZJO-FM 94.5, "Festival of the Arts" on WCTC-AM 1450, and WKLC-FM 105.1. Their music has been featured and reviewed in many publications, including Marysville Globe, Arlington Times, West Virginia Gazz, Voiceboxx, Vibe, Bowling Green Daily News, Bellingham Herald, Shoreline Ebbtide, The Parthenon, Charleston Gazette, Huntington Herald-Dispatch, Kanawha Metro, Putnam Metro, Putnam Herald, Putnam Post, The Putnam Standard, All The Rage, Nashville Scene, and more.

In addition to regional and national tours of festivals and college campuses, the band tours internationally in support of the United States military through an association with Armed Forces Entertainment.

Micah is a member of ASCAP performing rights society. Josiah and Gabriel are members of BMI.

== Discography ==
- Feel, digital single August 8, 2008
- Song of the Week Volume 4, 2008
- Song of the Week Volume 3, 2007
- Song of the Week Volume 2, 2007
- Song of the Week Volume 1, 2007
- The Physics of Immortality, March 9, 2007
- "Oakwood", February 24, 2006
- SNOW (EP), December 15, 2005
- Wisdom from the Green Shag Carpet, June 22, 2005
- Sneak Peek, April 15, 2004
- Roughdraft, October 3, 2003
