= Reddington, Indiana =

- Unincorporated community and Census-designated place
- Location within Indiana Location within the United States
- Coordinates: 39°02′05″N 85°50′04″W
- Country: United States
- State: Indiana
- County: Jackson
- Township: Redding
- Elevation: 646 ft (197 m)
- ZIP code: 47274
- FIPS code: 18-63432
- GNIS feature ID: 2830419

Reddington is an unincorporated community in Redding Township, Jackson County, Indiana.

== History ==
Reddington was laid out in 1837. It took its name from Redding Township. A post office was established at Reddington in 1837, and remained in operation until it was discontinued in 1902.

== Demographics ==
The United States Census Bureau defined Reddington as a census designated place in the 2022 American Community Survey.
