= Tornado outbreak of April 9–11, 2011 =

Tornado outbreak in the United States

- NEXRAD loop of storms across eastern Nebraska and western Iowa on April 9.

Meteorological history
- Duration: April 9–11, 2011

Tornado outbreak
- Tornadoes: 49 confirmed
- Max. rating: EF4 tornado
- Duration: 54 hours, 31 minutes
- Highest winds: Tornadic – 170 mph (270 km/h) (Pocahontas, Iowa EF4 on April 9)

Overall effects
- Fatalities: 0
- Injuries: 21
- Damage: $2.2 billion (2011 USD)
- Areas affected: Midwestern United States, Southern United States
- Part of the tornado outbreaks of 2011

A tornado outbreak took place on April 9–11, 2011. The outbreak was one of several tornado outbreaks in the United States to take place during the record month of April of that year, 49 tornadoes were produced across the Midwest and Southeast from April 9–11. Widespread damage took place; however, no fatalities resulted from the event due to timely warnings. In Wisconsin, 16 tornadoes touched down, ranking this outbreak as the state's largest April event on record as well as one of the largest single-day events during the course of any year. The strongest tornado of the outbreak was an EF4 tornado that touched down west of Pocahontas, Iowa on April 9, a short-lived satellite to a long-track EF3 tornado. Between 9:56 to 9:58 p.m. CDT (02:56 to 02:58 UTC) that day, five tornadoes were on the ground simultaneously in Pocahontas County, Iowa, all of which were from one supercell thunderstorm. Other tornadoes impacted parts of eastern Kentucky and Tennessee on April 9, hours before the event in Iowa.

Throughout Iowa, damage from the storms was estimated at $78.6 million, much of which likely took place in and around Mapleton, which was struck by an EF3 tornado on April 9. In addition to the tornadoes, Texas experienced a widespread straight-line wind and hail event, leaving $100 million in damage. Overall, losses from the storm system reached $2.2 billion, making it the third of a record sixteen billion dollar disasters in 2011.

== Meteorological synopsis ==
A large storm system with an associated frontal boundary moved northward and eastward across the central United States beginning on April 8. While initial severe weather was limited, a lone supercell broke out ahead of a mesoscale convective system in Pulaski County, Virginia on the eastern end of the warm front that evening. Two tornadoes were confirmed, one of which was an EF2 that caused severe damage in Pulaski, Virginia. Numerous houses were damaged and eight people were injured. An outbreak began across the United States during the afternoon of April 9; supercells developed along the warm front and tracked through parts of Kentucky, Tennessee, Virginia, and North Carolina, generating softball sized hail and eight more tornadoes.

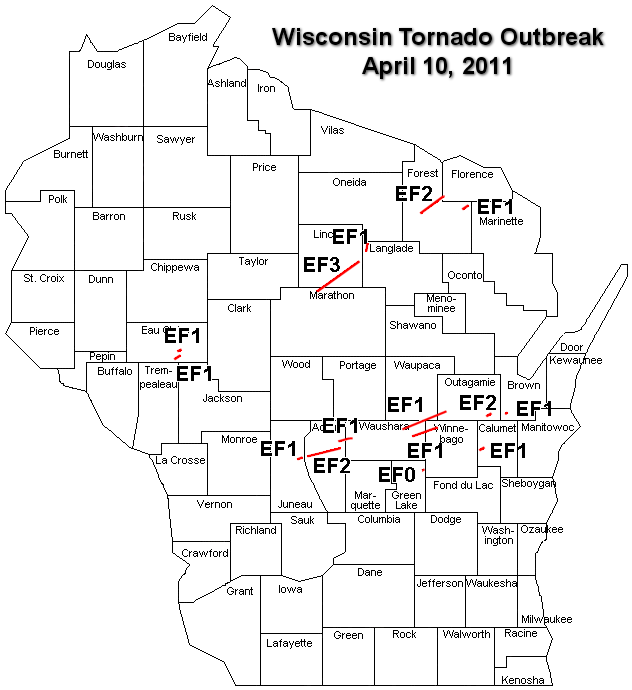
Map of Wisconsin showing more than a dozen confirmed tornado tracks on April 10.

At the same time, a progressive upper-level trough moved east out of the Rocky Mountains and over the Midwest. Owing to early morning thunderstorms, moisture levels in the central Great Plains increased; however, capping in the region would limit daytime activity before atmospheric instability allowed for severe weather. Forecast models indicated that the low-level jetstream would produce significant wind shear, aiding in the formation of possible tornadic supercell thunderstorms, and convective available potential energy (CAPE) values could exceed 3,000 J/kg. In light of this, the Storm Prediction Center (SPC) stated a moderate risk of severe weather for areas around the Minnesota-Iowa border. A slight risk was also defined for a broader region surrounding the moderate as well as a narrow line extending southward to Texas. A warm front began developing along the southeastern side of the low pressure area as it moved over The Dakotas.

During the evening hours of April 9, the SPC issued a tornado watch for western and northern Iowa, eastern Nebraska and southeast South Dakota. Conditions within this region were favorable for the development of multiple tornadic storms and there was a 70 percent chance of multiple touchdowns. Around 22:50 UTC (5:50 p.m. CDT), a strong thunderstorm developed over Burt/Cuming Counties in northeastern Nebraska. This cell slowly tracked east-northeastward and developed into a supercell as it moved into Monona County, Iowa. At 00:20 UTC (7:20 p.m. CDT), a small tornado touched down roughly two miles (3.2 km) southwest of Mapleton. Within minutes, this storm quickly grew and intensified as it moved closer to the city. The tornado passed directly over the city at low-end EF3 strength. Turning northward, the tornado dissipated about one mile (1.6 km) north of Mapleton. A separate EF2 tornado struck the town of Early, where considerable damage occurred to homes and businesses.

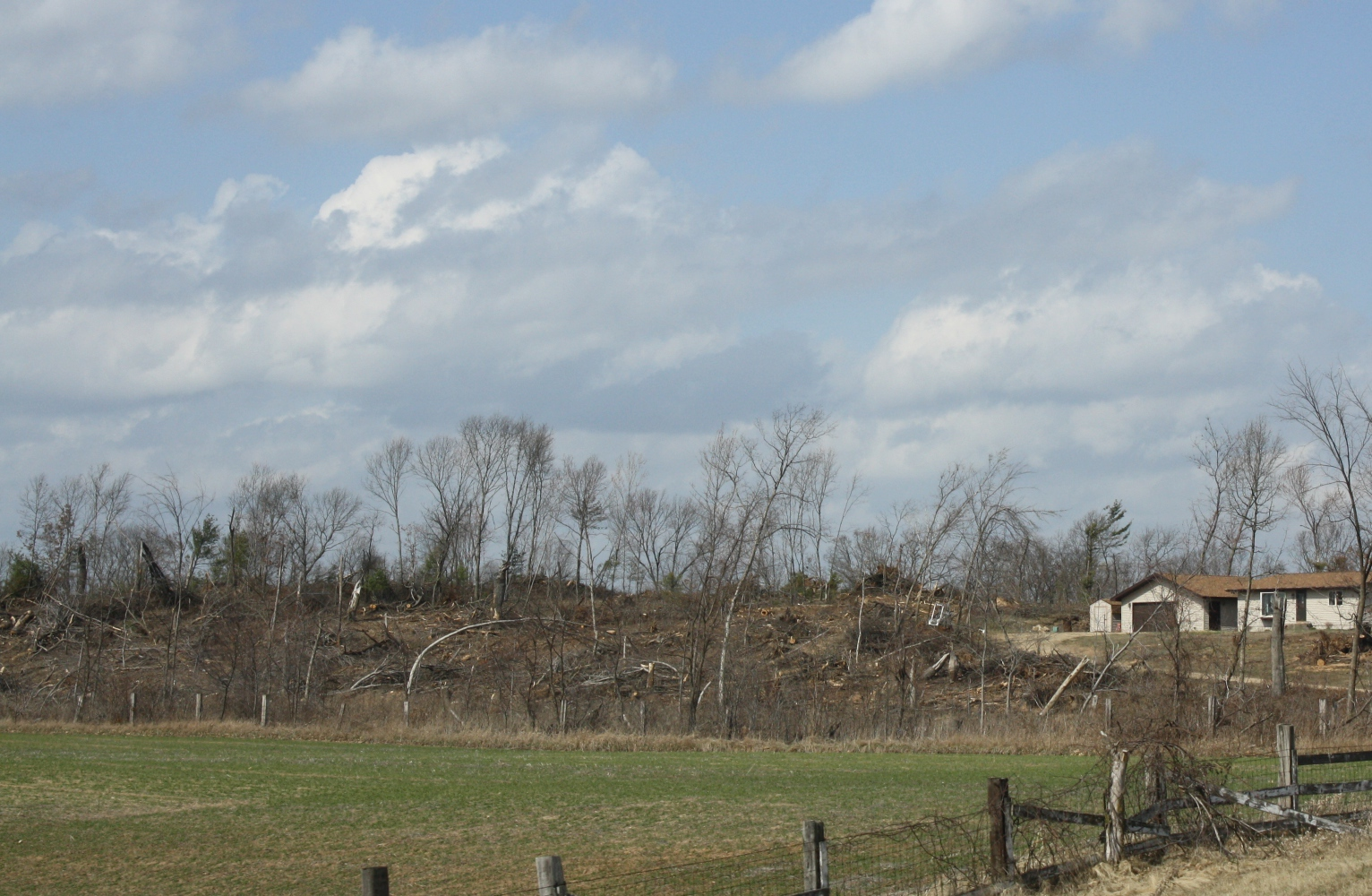
Cottonville, Wisconsin EF2 tornado damage, one year later

Tracking northeastward, the supercell moved into Ida County, another tornado touched down around 01:20 UTC (8:20 p.m. CDT) to the west of Arthur. This storm remained on the ground for eight minutes, during which it damaged a few structures, before dissipating two miles (3.2 km) northwest of Arthur. Around the same time, the cell entered Sac County and the first in a series of multiple tornadoes touched down northwest of Odebolt. Over the following three hours, 14 tornadoes touched down across Sac, Buena Vista, and Pocahontas counties. At 02:08 UTC (9:08 p.m. CST), a 1.5-mile (2.4 km) wide EF3 tornado touched down in northern Sac County. Remaining on the ground for an hour, this tornado meandered along a 30-mile (48 km) path, producing several satellite tornadoes, including a short-lived EF4 tornado west of Pocahontas.

Officials blocked off the town and Iowa state governor Terry Branstad issued a disaster proclamation for the town. Early estimates indicated that 60% of the town was damaged and 20% was nearly flattened. Despite the damage, only three people sustained minor injuries.

On April 10, another moderate risk was issued. A PDS Tornado Watch was issued for parts of Minnesota, Michigan, and Iowa, as well as most of Wisconsin. With 16 confirmed tornadoes in Wisconsin, the outbreak ranked as the largest single-day event in April in the state. Severe damage occurred in the towns of Merrill, Kaukauna, and Cottonville. On the evening of April 10, a number of tornado watches and warning were issued stretching from southern Oklahoma to Sault. Ste. Marie, Michigan as well as central Ontario which became Canada's first tornado watch of the season. Thunderstorm watches and warnings were also reported as far away as northern and northwestern Ontario.

== Confirmed tornadoes ==
Confirmed tornadoes by Enhanced Fujita rating
EFU	EF0	EF1	EF2	EF3	EF4	EF5	Total
0	12	25	7	4	1	0	49

=== April 9 event ===
List of confirmed tornadoes – Saturday, April 9, 2011 (Note: All dates are based on the local time zone where the tornado touched down; however, all times are in Coordinated Universal Time and dates are split at midnight CDT for consistency.)
EF#	Location	County / Parish	State	Start Coord.	Time (UTC)	Path length	Max width	Damage (Note: All damage totals are in 2011 USD unless otherwise stated.)
EF0	W of Valeria	Menifee, Wolfe	KY	37.83°N 83.62°W	18:00–18:04	0.25 mi (0.40 km)	250 yd (230 m)	$10,000
EF0	Hundreds of trees were damaged in the Daniel Boone National Forest. The path may have been longer but was unable to be surveyed.							
EF0	Valeria	Wolfe	KY	37.8305°N 83.5164°W	18:05–18:09	0.25 mi (0.40 km)	100 yd (91 m)	$30,000
EF0	A well-constructed barn lifted and moved, a well-anchored carport was destroyed, and many large trees were twisted or uprooted. Two houses and a vehicle were also damaged.							
EF0	Norton	City of Norton	VA	36.9343°N 82.6329°W	19:45–19:48	0.37 mi (0.60 km)	40 yd (37 m)	$50,000
EF0	Two old buildings sustained roof damage and partial wall collapse, and several trees were downed.							
EF0	Milligan College	Carter	TN	36.2971°N 82.3174°W	20:35–20:40	0.89 mi (1.43 km)	50 yd (46 m)	$20,000
EF0	Several trees were downed in the community of Milligan College, just west of Milligan College.							
EF0	NNE of Shelby	Cleveland	NC	35.368°N 81.512°W	20:50–20:51	0.53 mi (0.85 km)	75 yd (69 m)	$50,000
EF0	Two mobile homes were flipped over, injuring three of the occupants in one. Several houses sustained minor structural damage, and other mobile homes received mainly minor underskirting and roof damage. The roof was blown off a vehicle shed, and trees were downed.							
EF1	E of Jonesborough	Washington	TN	36.3000°N 82.4341°W	22:00–22:05	3 mi (4.8 km)	150 yd (140 m)	$75,000
EF1	Three barns were heavily damaged, and numerous trees and power lines were downed.							
EF1	Johnson City	Washington	TN	36.3037°N 82.3923°W	22:08–22:11	0.61 mi (0.98 km)	100 yd (91 m)	$10,000
EF1	Several large trees were knocked down.							
EF0	NNE of Flag Pond	Unicoi	TN	36.0424°N 82.5568°W	22:15–22:20	1.04 mi (1.67 km)	50 yd (46 m)	$15,000
EF0	Several trees were downed.							
EF3	Mapleton	Monona	IA	42.1535°N 95.8283°W	00:20–00:26	3.38 mi (5.44 km)	1,200 yd (1,100 m)	Unknown
EF3	See article on this tornado – 14 people were injured.							
EF1	NW of Ricketts	Crawford	IA	42.1956°N 95.6493°W	00:37–00:38	0.69 mi (1.11 km)	75 yd (69 m)	$25,000
EF1	This tornado, which was produced by the same storm as the Mapleton EF3 tornado, knocked down power lines.							
EF2	W of Arthur	Ida	IA	42.3217°N 95.3969°W	01:20–01:28	4.13 mi (6.65 km)	440 yd (400 m)	$50,000
EF2	This tornado occurred between Arthur and Ida Grove, where two grain bins and two outbuildings on a farmstead were either heavily damaged or destroyed, and a house and garage sustained shingle damage. Several trees were downed, and power poles and lines were damaged.							
EF3	NW of Odebolt to E of Schaller	Sac	IA	42.3549°N 95.2860°W	01:23–01:55	10.14 mi (16.32 km)	1,760 yd (1,610 m)	$2,000,000
EF3	A large wedge tornado damaged or destroyed several houses and downed power lines. It initially moved northeast toward Early before making a sharp turn north-northwest to just east of Schaller. This tornado occurred simultaneously to and just west of the following tornado.							
EF2	N of Odebolt to N of Early	Sac	IA	42.3746°N 95.2424°W	01:29–01:54	8.34 mi (13.42 km)	660 yd (600 m)	$1,000,000
EF2	See article on this tornado.							
EF0	SSW of Early	Sac	IA	42.3948°N 95.2027°W	01:38–01:40	0.75 mi (1.21 km)	100 yd (91 m)	$1,000
EF0	This tornado formed as a satellite to the previous tornado. It executed a brief loop and then moved due north before dissipating. It remained primarily over open country.							
EF1	S of Galva	Ida	IA	42.4364°N 95.4499°W	01:42–01:47	4.21 mi (6.78 km)	200 yd (180 m)	$100,000
EF1	A farmstead was severely damaged, with numerous outbuildings destroyed and a home losing its roof. Outbuildings at another farmstead were damaged, as was an outbuilding at an ethanol plant. At least five power poles were snapped, and trees were downed as well.							
EF3	NNE of Early to NW of Pocahontas	Sac, Buena Vista, Pocahontas	IA	42.5191°N 95.1291°W	02:08–03:07	29.37 mi (47.27 km)	2,640 yd (2,410 m)	$13,000,000
EF3	See article on this tornado – A very large and long lived wedge tornado traversed through three counties, causing severe damage to several farmsteads and the communities of Varina and Ware.							
EF0	S of Sulphur Springs	Buena Vista	IA	42.58°N 95.09°W	02:14–02:15	0.53 mi (0.85 km)	50 yd (46 m)	$0
EF0	This brief tornado occurred just a few miles north of the long-track EF3 tornado that began at 02:08 UTC. No damage was reported.							
EF1	SSE of Cherokee	Cherokee	IA	42.6067°N 95.5435°W	02:20–02:30	5.17 mi (8.32 km)	300 yd (270 m)	$100,000
EF1	Several outbuildings were damaged or destroyed on two farmsteads, a camper was flipped into a garage, causing damage to both, a large anchored empty tank was flipped, and several buildings in a livestock confinement area were heavily damaged. A house sustained roof damage and broken windows, a grain bin was blown into a semi truck, and a semi trailer was flipped onto another grain bin. Several trees were snapped or uprooted, corn stubble was scoured, and power poles and lines were damaged.							
EF2	SE of Newell	Sac, Buena Vista	IA	42.5556°N 94.9744°W	02:24–02:27	1.6 mi (2.6 km)	220 yd (200 m)	$510,000
EF2	First satellite tornado of the EF3 tornado that touched down at 02:08 UTC.							
EF1	ESE of Newell	Buena Vista	IA	42.5751°N 94.9438°W	02:25–02:27	1.08 mi (1.74 km)	150 yd (140 m)	$10,000
EF1	Several outbuildings and farm structures were damaged. This tornado tracked over the same track of the EF3 tornado that began at 02:08 UTC.							
EF0	SW of Alta	Buena Vista	IA	42.64°N 95.34°W	02:50–02:51	0.17 mi (0.27 km)	50 yd (46 m)	$0
EF0	A storm chaser reported two simultaneous brief tornadoes with no damage.							
EF0	SW of Alta	Buena Vista	IA	42.65°N 95.35°W	02:50–02:51	0.17 mi (0.27 km)	50 yd (46 m)	$0
EF0	A storm chaser reported two simultaneous brief tornadoes with no damage.							
EF4	W of Pocahontas	Pocahontas	IA	42.7293°N 94.8557°W	02:54–03:01	3.2 mi (5.1 km)	587 yd (537 m)	$2,500,000
EF4	Second satellite tornado of the EF3 tornado that touched down at 02:08 UTC. One farmstead was completely devastated by this violent tornado.							
EF1	WSW of Pocahontas	Pocahontas	IA	42.6895°N 94.8141°W	02:55–02:58	1.58 mi (2.54 km)	100 yd (91 m)	$10,000
EF1	Third satellite tornado of the EF3 tornado that touched down at 02:08 UTC. This was the cyclonic counterpart of the following, fourth satellite tornado.							
EF1	WSW of Pocahontas	Pocahontas	IA	42.6912°N 94.8141°W	02:55–02:58	1.64 mi (2.64 km)	100 yd (91 m)	$10,000
EF1	Fourth satellite tornado of the EF3 tornado that touched down at 02:08 UTC. This was the anticyclonic counterpart of the previous, third satellite tornado.							
EF2	W of Pocahontas	Pocahontas	IA	42.7105°N 94.8144°W	02:56–02:58	0.9 mi (1.4 km)	146 yd (134 m)	$100,000
EF2	Fifth satellite tornado of the EF3 tornado that touched down at 02:08 UTC. This tornado was quickly absorbed by the second, violent EF4 satellite tornado.							
EF1	WNW of Pocahontas	Pocahontas	IA	42.7340°N 94.7442°W	03:08–03:13	2.42 mi (3.89 km)	250 yd (230 m)	$10,000
EF1	One house was damaged as the tornado remained over mostly open fields. This tornado occurred east of the track of the 02:08 UTC EF3 tornado that had just dissipated to the northwest.							
EF1	WNW of St. Joseph	Kossuth	IA	42.9231°N 94.2771°W	04:19–04:21	0.79 mi (1.27 km)	100 yd (91 m)	$150,000
EF1	A hog barn was damaged, numerous windows were blown out, and a shed was partially collapsed.							

=== April 10 event ===
List of confirmed tornadoes – Sunday, April 10, 2011
EF#	Location	County / Parish	State	Start Coord.	Time (UTC)	Path length	Max width	Damage
EF1	SW of Augusta	Eau Claire	WI	44.63°N 91.19°W	21:57–22:03	1.58 mi (2.54 km)	200 yd (180 m)	$200,000
EF1	Two farmsteads were impacted, with many trees downed. At one, a garage was destroyed, and a barn was heavily damaged as well. This was the earliest tornado to touch down in Eau Claire County on record; the previous earliest was May 10.							
EF1	NW of Augusta	Eau Claire	WI	44.69°N 91.14°W	22:04–22:06	0.74 mi (1.19 km)	150 yd (140 m)	$250,000
EF1	Two outbuildings destroyed, three more were heavily damaged, and numerous trees and power poles were snapped.							
EF3	N of Hamburg to NE of Merrill	Marathon, Lincoln	WI	45.1113°N 89.8858°W	23:08–23:41	21.15 mi (34.04 km)	1,050 yd (960 m)	$11,158,000
EF3	See section on this tornado – 2 people were injured.							
EF2	W of Arkdale to ENE of Cottonville	Adams	WI	44.0216°N 89.9549°W	23:12–23:30	17.08 mi (27.49 km)	800 yd (730 m)	$3,300,000
EF2	Numerous houses sustained roof and structural damage, and mobile homes were either heavily damaged or destroyed, along with barns and sheds. A camping trailer was also overturned and sheet metal was wrapped around trees. A lake association building was completely destroyed, a cement silo was knocked over, vehicles were flipped, and numerous center-pivot irrigation systems were twisted or destroyed. Numerous trees were downed along the path.							
EF1	S of Necedah	Juneau	WI	43.9954°N 90.0936°W	23:14–23:21	4.37 mi (7.03 km)	150 yd (140 m)	$30,000
EF1	A mobile home was rolled over, and pine trees were snapped.							
EF1	SW of Hancock	Adams, Waushara	WI	44.0754°N 89.6184°W	23:30–23:42	11.73 mi (18.88 km)	140 yd (130 m)	$601,000
EF1	Several houses sustained roof damage, the roof was torn off a mobile home, and several center-pivot irrigation systems were destroyed. Trees and power poles were downed as well.							
EF1	SE of Parrish	Langlade	WI	45.3496°N 89.3822°W	23:50–23:58	5.3 mi (8.5 km)	400 yd (370 m)	$1,000,000
EF1	This tornado produced extensive tree damage along the path, affecting over 1,600 acres (6.5 km^{2}) and knocking down or damaging over one million trees. One cabin was destroyed by falling trees.							
EF1	Saxeville to Fremont to SE of Hortonville	Waushara, Waupaca, Outagamie	WI	44.1687°N 89.1356°W	00:06–00:43	27.68 mi (44.55 km)	200 yd (180 m)	Unknown
EF1	Multiple barns and other farm buildings were heavily damaged or destroyed, and highway signs were damaged. The roof was torn off a house in Readfield, and the steeple was torn off a church. Many trees were snapped or uprooted along the path.							
EF2	SE of Argonne to SE of Popple River	Forest, Florence	WI	45.6386°N 88.8233°W	00:30–00:51	11.97 mi (19.26 km)	600 yd (550 m)	$215,000
EF2	Hundreds of trees were snapped or uprooted, some of which fell on cabins. A roof was torn off of a home, several barns and garages were destroyed, and power lines were downed as well.							
EF1	Poy Sippi to W of Winchester	Waushara, Winnebago	WI	44.1327°N 89.0045°W	00:53–01:07	14.93 mi (24.03 km)	150 yd (140 m)	$1,470,000
EF1	Near Poy Sippi, a house was damaged, and a barn was destroyed. Along the north shore of Lake Poygan, another barn was flattened. Near Boom Bay in Winnebago County, two homes lost portions of their roofs, while several other houses sustained minor damage. Two small mobile homes were rolled as well. Many trees were snapped or uprooted along the path.							
EF1	W of Armstrong Creek	Forest	WI	45.6500°N 88.5253°W	01:03–01:08	3.29 mi (5.29 km)	250 yd (230 m)	$50,000
EF1	A garage was destroyed, and two houses were damaged, one of which sustained significant roof damage. Many trees were snapped or uprooted as well.							
EF0	SE of Berlin	Green Lake	WI	43.9198°N 88.9130°W	01:27–01:29	1.83 mi (2.95 km)	50 yd (46 m)	$300
EF0	Lawn furniture was sucked from under a porch and thrown against a fence, an outdoor spa was damaged, and a wooden structure received light damage. Trees and tree branches were snapped as well.							
EF2	Kaukauna	Outagamie	WI	44.2578°N 88.2881°W	01:43–01:46	1.52 mi (2.45 km)	175 yd (160 m)	$6,700,000
EF2	Over 180 houses were impacted in Kaukauna, several of them losing large sections of their roofs. In total, seven homes were destroyed, 24 homes and four businesses sustained major damage, and 160 other homes sustained minor damage. A church sustained roof damage and had air conditioning units torn off, and large trees were snapped or uprooted.							
EF1	S of Greenleaf	Brown	WI	44.2578°N 88.2881°W	01:53–01:55	1.2 mi (1.9 km)	75 yd (69 m)	$15,000
EF1	The tops of two silos were damaged, and a barn roof was ripped off.							
EF1	S of Stockbridge	Calumet	WI	44.0378°N 88.3214°W	01:59–02:01	1.67 mi (2.69 km)	100 yd (91 m)	$100,000
EF1	A waterspout moved onshore from Lake Winnebago and damaged two homes. A three-season room on one of the houses was ripped off the structure. It also tore off a section of the roof of a large metal outbuilding and snapped the tops of trees.							
EF0	NNE of Rogersville	Webster	MO	37.15°N 93.06°W	03:55–04:03	6.67 mi (10.73 km)	100 yd (91 m)	$10,000
EF0	Outbuildings were damaged, and trees were downed.							

=== April 11 event ===
List of confirmed tornadoes – Monday, April 11, 2011
EF#	Location	County / Parish	State	Start Coord.	Time (UTC)	Path length	Max width	Damage
EF1	NNW of Rio Vista	Johnson	TX	32.2702°N 97.4159°W	06:09–06:13	1.51 mi (2.43 km)	100 yd (91 m)	$150,000
EF1	Five houses were damaged, one of them heavily, and a wall was torn from a pharmacy. A garage was shifted off its foundation, and several trees were downed.							
EF1	Alvarado	Johnson	TX	32.4143°N 97.2330°W	06:22–06:23	0.13 mi (0.21 km)	50 yd (46 m)	$100,000
EF1	Five commercial buildings were damaged, and a mobile home was flipped. Two people were injured.							
EF1	Northern Forney	Kaufman	TX	32.7721°N 96.4716°W	07:13–07:17	0.53 mi (0.85 km)	60 yd (55 m)	$60,000
EF1	Five houses sustained roof damage, and a truck stop sign was blown over.							
EF1	Cash to NW of Lone Oak	Hunt	TX	32.9888°N 96.1126°W	07:34–07:48	6.53 mi (10.51 km)	200 yd (180 m)	$250,000
EF1	Eight homes, a pipe manufacturing plant, and two metal buildings were damaged in Cash, while four U-Haul trailers were blown across the highway. Several more homes sustain mainly minor roof damage to the northeast of Cash, although one home sustained significant damage to the roof and second story. Northwest of Lone Oak, five mobile homes were damaged or destroyed, and another site-built home sustained significant damage. Trees were downed along the path.							
EF1	Vestavia Hills	Jefferson	AL	33.4496°N 86.7883°W	00:30–00:31	0.38 mi (0.61 km)	100 yd (91 m)	$65,000
EF1	This brief tornado was embedded in a larger microburst. Several homes and other buildings were damaged, mostly by falling trees, and the windows were blown out of a vehicle. Numerous trees were snapped or uprooted as well.							

=== Northwest Iowa tornadoes ===
Confirmed tornadoes by Enhanced Fujita rating
EFU	EF0	EF1	EF2	EF3	EF4	EF5	Total
0	4	8	4	3	1	0	20
This only includes tornadoes in Iowa on April 9.

Northwest Iowa tornadoes
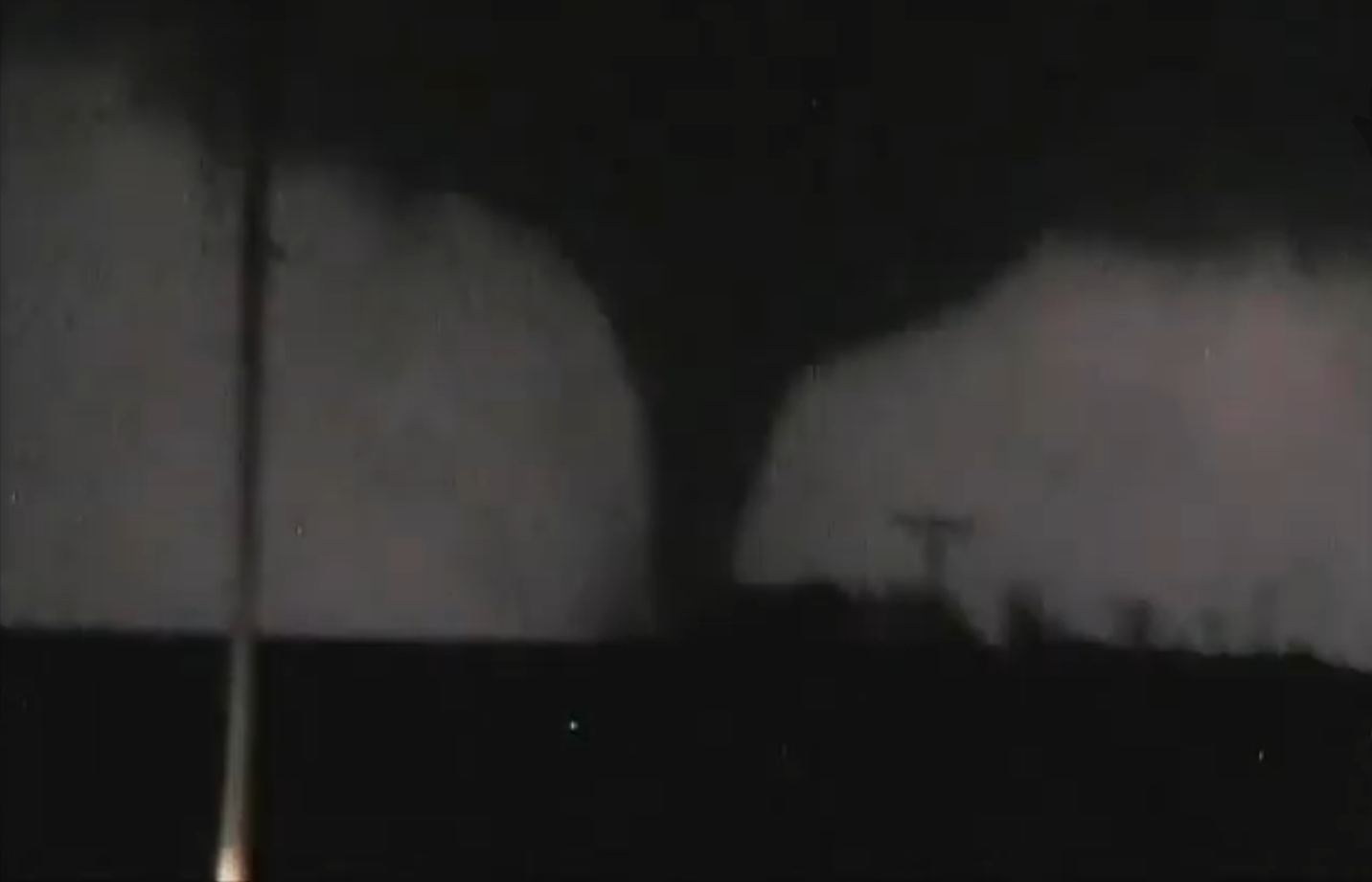
- One of the tornadoes in rural Sac County.

Meteorological history
- Formed: April 9, 2011, 7:20 p.m. CDT (UTC−05:00)
- Dissipated: April 9, 2011, 11:21 p.m. CDT (UTC−05:00)
- Duration: 4 hours, 1 minute

Tornadoes
- Tornadoes: 20 confirmed
- Max. rating: EF4 tornado
- Duration: 4 hours, 1 minute
- Highest winds: 170 mph (270 km/h) (Pocahontas, Iowa EF4)

Overall effects
- Fatalities: 0
- Injuries: 14
- Damage: $19.576 million (2011 USD)
- Areas affected: Monona, Crawford, Ida, Sac, Buena Vista, Pocahontas and Kossuth Counties, Iowa

Throughout the evening of April 9, supercell thunderstorms developed from eastern Nebraska, and moved into western Iowa. Over the span of 4 hours from 7:20 p.m. CDT (00:20 UTC) to 11:21 p.m. CDT (04:21 UTC), approximately 20 tornadoes, some of them strong to violent (EF2–EF4) in intensity, touched down over a vast area from Monona County, to Kossuth County across portions of northwestern Iowa. A tornado family was confirmed by the National Weather Service office in Des Moines. Many rural farmsteads and communities were affected by the storms.

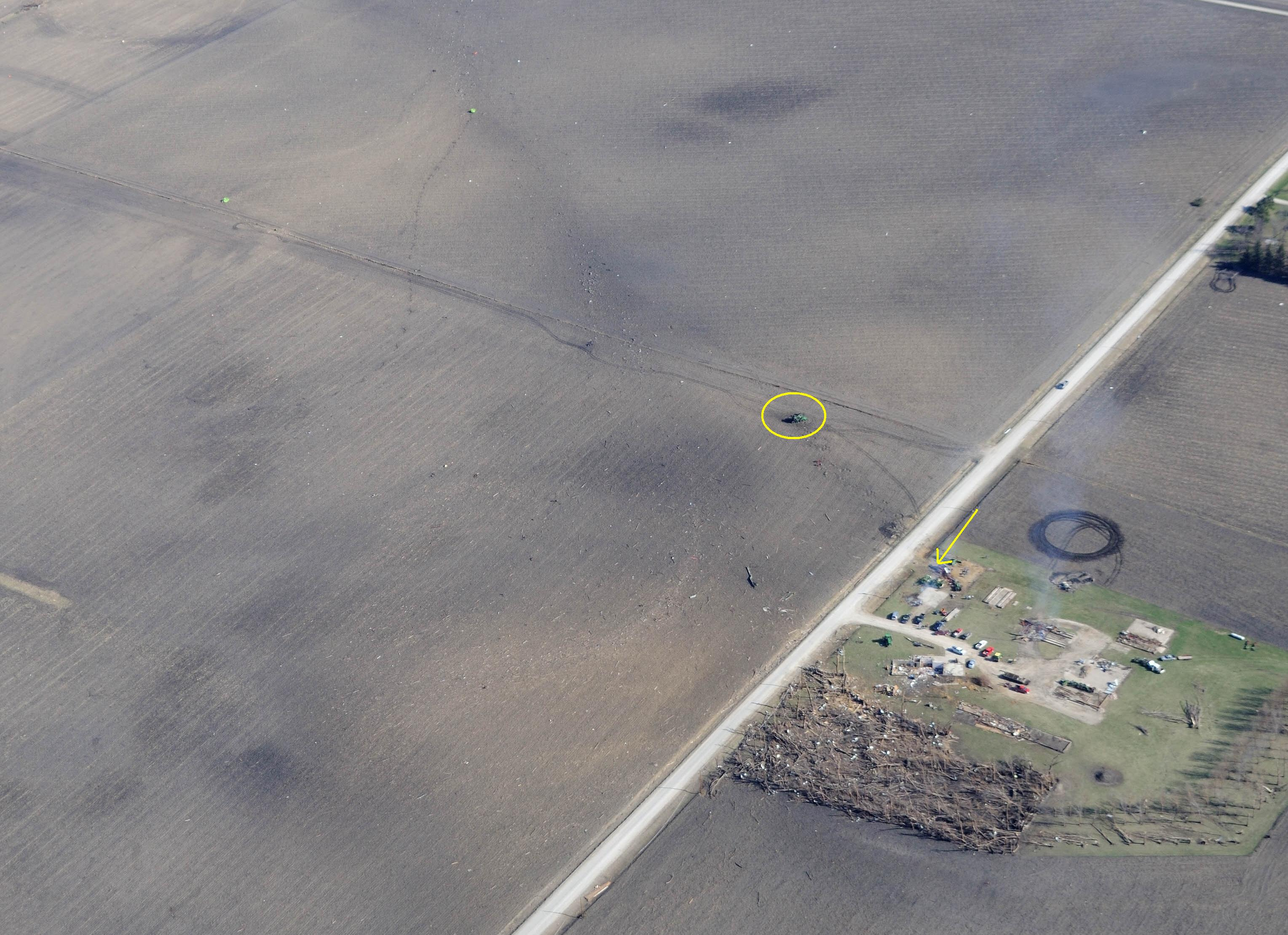
Aerial view of the damage at a farmstead by an EF4 tornado in western Pocahontas County.

The first tornado in Iowa of the evening, formed southwest of Mapleton at 7:20 p.m. CDT (00:20 UTC). This large EF3 tornado, after tracking a short distance, steadily intensified in strength and directly hit the Monona County city. The intense tornado caused widespread damage throughout Mapleton, with buildings severely destroyed and trees uprooted. After exiting the city, the tornado quickly weakened and diminished soon after. No fatalities were reported from this tornado though it was responsible for around 14 injuries, making it the only tornado in Iowa to have claimed casualties on April 9. After that, the storms moved northeast, producing a brief EF1 tornado near Ricketts before spawning a more significant EF2 tornado after sunset west of Arthur, which impacted a few farmsteads. After the EF2 tornado, a larger and stronger EF3 tornado developed north-northwest of Odebolt, which impacted rural homes to the north and soon was accompanied by yet another large and damaging EF2 tornado that headed directly for Early. Major damage occurred by this EF2 tornado as it went through the Sac County city, before dissipating after exiting. After the end of that particular tornado, the storm put down a more massive, long-lived and powerful EF3 tornado just west of Nemaha. This very large tornado was accompanied by several satellite tornadoes along a large portion of its track, which were two pairs of EF1 and EF2 tornadoes, and one violent EF4 tornado which heavily damaged or destroyed farmsteads along the flank of the very large EF3 parent tornado. The small communities of Varina and Ware were affected by this massive tornado at EF2 intensity, having also inflicted EF3 damage to a farmhouse near Pocahontas (City) before soon dissipating at 10:07 p.m. CDT (03:07 UTC). Additional but weaker EF0 to EF1 tornadoes also occurred elsewhere in portions of northwestern Iowa, with the final one of them and last tornado in general of the night occurring near St. Joseph before the event came to an end after 11:20 p.m. CDT (00:20 UTC).

=== Hamburg–Merrill, Wisconsin ===
Hamburg–Merrill, Wisconsin
- The tornado seen at peak intensity in Merrill.

Meteorological history
- Formed: April 10, 2011; 6:08 p.m. CDT (UTC−05:00)
- Dissipated: April 10, 2011; 6:41 p.m. CDT (UTC−05:00)
- Duration: 33 minutes

EF3 tornado
- on the Enhanced Fujita scale
- Highest winds: 140 mph (230 km/h)

Overall effects
- Fatalities: 0
- Injuries: 2
- Damage: $11.158 million (2011 USD)

During the early evening hours on April 10, a supercell thunderstorm dropped this large and powerful tornado north of Hamburg in northern Marathon County, at 6:08 p.m. CDT (23:08 UTC). Being within Marathon County for just two minutes, the tornado, at at EF0 intensity, uprooted many pine trees and snapped branches off them. One house had minor damage inflicted to it, as the tornado compromised parts of the exterior walls. Several barns also had had roofs torn off or were blown away before the tornado moved into Lincoln County at 6:10 p.m. CDT (23:10 UTC). The tornado within this short portion of its path, had an average width of 100 yards (91 m) across.

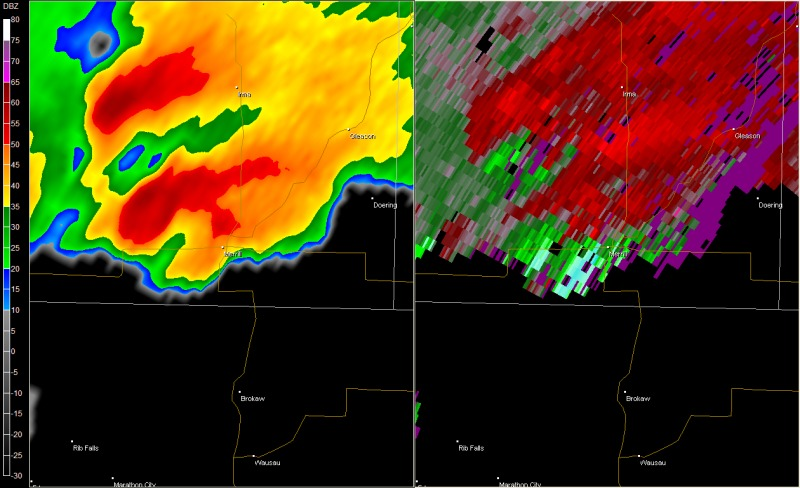
Next-Generation Radar scan at 6:23 p.m. CDT (23:23 UTC) of the tornado.

The storm crossed the border over, just south of Devil Creek. The tornado then would cross over the body of water, heading northeast towards the large city of Merrill. Four minutes later, the National Weather Service office in Green Bay, Wisconsin issued a tornado warning for both Marathon and Lincoln Counties, but also the counties of Langlade and Shawano at 6:14 p.m. CDT (23:14 UTC). Traversing across rural portions of Lincoln County for about eight minutes, the storm then impacted the northern side of Merrill at approximately 6:22 p.m. CDT (23:22 UTC).

It was here that the tornado reached EF3 intensity, inflicting severe damage on numerous structures. Seven businesses and numerous homes were considered destroyed, as for the homes they were reported to nearly having lost most exterior walls and some interior ones. Alongside that, around 22 houses and one business sustained major levels of damage. Around 20 and four other residential and commercial properties suffered more minor damage by the tornado. One 67-year old was thrown 200 feet (61 m) from his home's bedroom and suffered from blunt trauma, as his ribs and lungs were broken and bruised, and a spleen was ruptured. Another person in the area also was injured by the tornado. Exiting out of Merrill, the tornado persisted for miles as it paralleled the Prairie River, before dissipating at 6:41 p.m. CDT (23:41 UTC). Within the entire track in Lincoln County, the storm left a path on average that was 400 yards (370 m) across.

This tornado was the strongest to occur during the historic outbreak in Wisconsin. More than $11 million (2011 USD) in damage was inflicted by the tornado across Marathon and Lincoln Counties. Two people were injured, one of them critically. The tornado was on the ground along a track that was 21.15 miles (34.04 km) long, and at its largest 1,050 yards (960 m) wide. Peak winds were estimated at 140 miles per hour (230 km/h).

== Non-tornadic events ==
=== Hail and wind event ===
Accompanying the tornadoes, large hail and high winds also impacted parts of the Midwest. Initially, these events associated with the outbreak were confined to Iowa and parts of Nebraska and Minnesota on April 9. In Iowa, hail was measured up to 3.5 in (8.9 cm) in diameter, resulting in some damage to homes and cars. On April 10, a large line of severe storms produced damage from northern Minnesota southward to the Texas-Mexico border. Most damage along this line resulted from straight-line winds; however, Wisconsin, 2 to 2.5 in (5.1 to 6.4 cm) diameter hail in La Crosse broke windows, dented cars and damaged homes. Roughly 3,200 insurance claims worth $12 million were later made in the city. Elsewhere in the state, winds up to 65 mph (105 km/h) downed numerous trees and power lines and in some instances tore roofs of buildings.

In Texas, winds as high as 95 mph (153 km/h) caused extensive damage to homes and businesses, resulting in roughly $100 million in damage. Numerous trees were felled across the region and a few structures were destroyed. In Dallas County, a few carports collapsed. Near Venus, 82 mph (132 km/h) winds damaged five homes.

=== Derecho event ===
On April 11, a strong derecho brought widespread damage to much of northern Alabama as well as parts of Mississippi, Georgia and Tennessee. Near Brent, Alabama, a wind gust of 110 mph (180 km/h) was recorded 70 ft (21 m) up on a radio tower.

== Aftermath ==
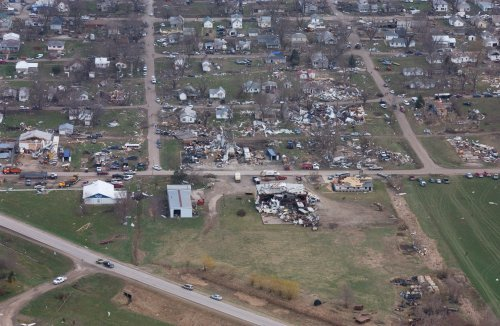
An aerial view of the damage in Mapleton, Iowa by the Iowa National Guard.

Within days of the tornadoes in Iowa, excavators were brought in to clear debris and tear down homes that were damaged beyond repair. On May 5, nearly a month after the outbreak, President Barack Obama signed a federal disaster declaration for Buena Vista, Cherokee, Ida, Monona, Pocahontas and Sac Counties in Iowa. This allowed for government aid to be sent to the region and aid in recovery efforts. The declaration remained in effect until May 1, 2012. A disaster outreach center was opened on May 6 at the Mapleton City Hall and the American Legion Post in Varina and would remain open through May 26. At these places, residents would be allowed to apply for small business and homeowner loans up to $2 million and $200,000 respectively.

In September 2019, Varina reopened their post office at a new location in the community eight years after the damaging EF3 tornado that tracked through Sac, Buena Vista and Pocahontas counties. Prior to its return, the community's postal office was temporarily relocated to Fonda for the time being.

== See also ==
- Weather of 2011
- List of North American tornadoes and tornado outbreaks
  - List of tornadoes with confirmed satellite tornadoes
- List of F4 and EF4 tornadoes
  - List of F4 and EF4 tornadoes (2010–2019)
- Satellite tornado
- 2025 South Kansas tornado family – An event where an intense tornado family occurred from one supercell
