= Newell School =

Newell School may refer to:

- Newell High School, historic location in South Dakota, United States
- Newell House School, school in Dorset, England
- Newell-Fonda High School, public secondary school in Newell, Iowa, United States
- Newell-Fonda Community School District, public school district in Newell, Iowa, United States

== See also ==
- New Hall School
- Newhall School District
- Newells Preparatory School
