= April 2011 tornado outbreak =

April 2011 tornado outbreak may refer to the following tornado outbreaks:

- Derecho and tornado outbreak of April 4–5, 2011
- Tornado outbreak of April 9–11, 2011
- Tornado outbreak of April 14–16, 2011
- Tornado outbreak sequence of April 19–24, 2011
- 2011 Super Outbreak (April 25–28)

== See also ==
- 2011 outbreak (disambiguation)
