= Jim Kelly (coach) =

American sports coach and college athletics administrator

- Kelly with Buena Vista in 1933

Biographical details
- Born: July 3, 1893; Fonda, Iowa, U.S.
- Died: July 11, 1972 (aged 79); Woodland Hills, California, U.S.
- Education: Buena Vista College; Morningside College; University of South Dakota

Coaching career (HC unless noted)

Football
- 1911–1921: Fonda HS (IA)
- 1922–1925: Buena Vista
- 1932–1933: DePaul (co-HC)
- 1934–1936: DePaul

Basketball
- 1911–1921: Fonda HS (IA)
- 1922–1925: Buena Vista
- 1929–1936: DePaul

Track and field
- 1911–1921: Fonda HS (IA)
- 1922–1925: Buena Vista
- 1926–1936: DePaul
- 1937–1963: Minnesota
- 1956: USA Olympic

Administrative career (AD unless noted)
- ?–1937: DePaul

Head coaching record
- Overall: 54–13–7 (college football)

James Dennis Kelly (July 3, 1893 – July 11, 1972) was an American football, basketball, and track and field coach and college athletics administrator. He coached at DePaul University and the University of Minnesota and was head coach of the United States track and field team at the 1956 Summer Olympics.

== Biography ==
Kelly was born on a farm near Fonda, Iowa on July 3, 1893; he was the third of five children in the family. In high school, he was a hurdler and middle-distance runner and played football and basketball. He studied at Buena Vista College, Morningside College, and the University of South Dakota; after graduating from South Dakota, he returned to Fonda as an all-sports high school coach, and then to Buena Vista as a collegiate basketball, football and track coach. His teams at Buena Vista put up good records in all three sports, including winning the 1925–26 Iowa Conference basketball championship; he left in 1926, moving to DePaul University. From 1929 to 1936 he served as DePaul's head basketball coach, compiling a 99–22 record; he was also the head football coach and athletic director.

In 1937 Kelly moved to the University of Minnesota as the head track coach. Kelly's start at Minnesota was slow, but he eventually built a successful program; the Minnesota Golden Gophers won the NCAA team championship in 1948, the only time they have won the title. At Minnesota, Kelly introduced an improved discus throw technique based on speed and good footwork; two of his pupils, Bob Fitch and Fortune Gordien, set new world records in the discus with the "Minnesota Whip". The technique eventually became the new standard. In 1956 he was head coach of the United States men's track and field team at the Summer Olympics in Melbourne; the Americans topped the medal table with 15 gold medals.

Kelly retired as Minnesota's track coach in 1963 but remained active in track and field as an official. He died in Woodland Hills, California on July 11, 1972, aged 79.

== Head coaching record ==
=== College football ===
Year	Team	Overall	Conference	Standing	Bowl/playoffs
Buena Vista Beavers (Independent) (1922)
1922	Buena Vista	6–0–1			
Buena Vista Beavers (Iowa Conference) (1923–1925)
1923	Buena Vista	4–3	2–1	T–3rd	
1924	Buena Vista	5–1–2	3–0	3rd	
1925	Buena Vista	8–1	1–0	N/A (Note: Did not qualify for conference title)	
Buena Vista:		23–5–3	6–1		
DePaul Blue Demons (Independent) (1932–1936)
1932	DePaul (Note: Served as co-head coach alongside Ben Connor.)	5–1–2			
1933	DePaul	6–0–1			
1934	DePaul	4–3			
1935	DePaul	5–2–1			
1936	DePaul	7–2			
DePaul:		27–8–4			
Total:		54–13–7			
