= Allee House =

Allee House may refer to:

- Allee House (Dutch Neck Crossroads, Delaware), listed on the National Register of Historic Places (NRHP)
- Jesse J. and Mary F. Allee House, Newell, Iowa, NRHP-listed in Iowa

== See also ==
- Allee Site, Hammon, Oklahoma, NRHP-listed in Roger Mills County, Oklahoma
