= 2011 outbreak =

2011 outbreak may refer to:

== Tornado outbreaks ==
- 2011 Super Outbreak
  - 2011 Hackleburg–Phil Campbell tornado
  - 2011 Tuscaloosa–Birmingham tornado
  - 2011 Philadelphia, Mississippi tornado
  - 2011 Smithville, Mississippi tornado
- Tornado outbreak of April 14–16, 2011
- Tornado outbreak sequence of May 21–26, 2011
- Derecho and tornado outbreak of April 4–5, 2011
- Tornado outbreak of April 9–11, 2011
- 2011 New England tornado outbreak
- Tornado outbreak sequence of April 19–24, 2011
- Tornado outbreak of June 18–22, 2011
- Tornado outbreak of November 14–16, 2011

== Other uses ==
- 2011 Germany E. coli O104:H4 outbreak, a foodborne illness outbreak
- 2011 dengue outbreak in Pakistan, a dengue fever outbreak in Pakistan
- 2011 Bulgaria foot-and-mouth disease outbreak, a Bulgaria foot-and-mouth disease outbreak
- 2011 United States listeriosis outbreak, an outbreak of listeriosis

== See also ==
- April 2011 tornado outbreak (disambiguation)
