= Bob Fitch =

American discus thrower and coach (1919–2003)

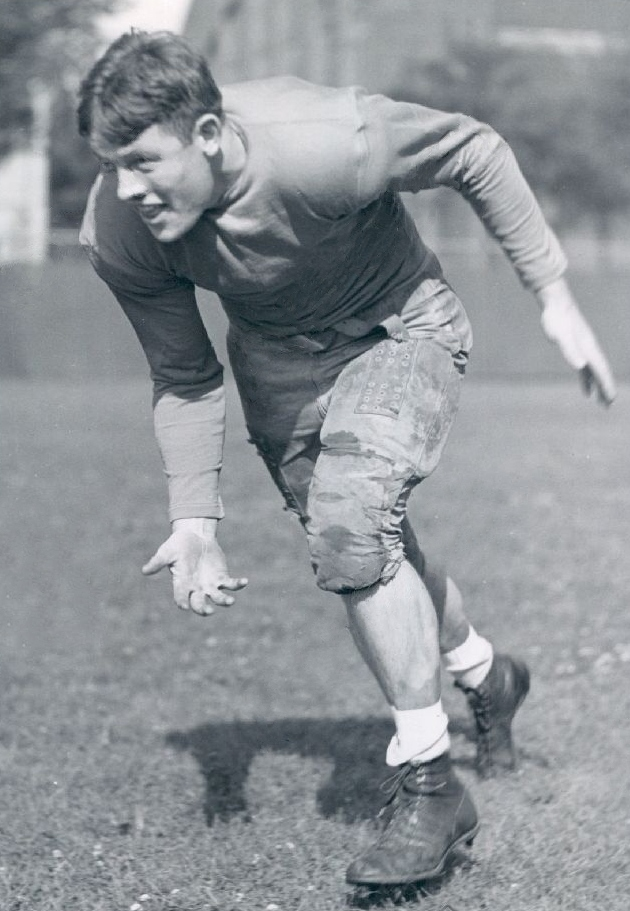
- Fitch in 1940

Personal information
- Born: Robert Fitch; July 29, 1919 Audubon, Iowa, U.S.
- Died: April 15, 2003 (aged 83) Bloomington, Indiana, U.S.
- Height: 6 ft 2 in (1.88 m)

Sport
- Country: USA
- Sport: American football, discus throw, golf

Achievements and titles
- Personal best: DT – 54.93 m (1946)

Robert E. Fitch (July 28, 1919 – April 15, 2003) was an American athlete and coach. He broke the world record in the discus throw in 1946 with a mark of 54.93 m (180 ft 2 3/4 in). He developed a rotational technique referred to as the "Minnesota Whip" and delivered a masters thesis on the subject. His training mate Fortune Gordien went on to break world records and win Olympic medals.

Fitch was a two-time American champion in the discus (1942 and 1946) and was the winner of the 1942 NCAA Championships. He was also part of the University of Minnesota championship-winning college football team. He later became golf coach for Indiana University and developed the team into a top level NCAA side, winning six Big Ten Conference titles during his tenure from 1957 to 1989 – a record for an Indiana coach.

== Career ==
Born in Audubon, Iowa, Fitch was the son of a veterinarian and spent the first ten years of his life in Audubon before moving with his family to Minneapolis. He went on to study at the University of Minnesota. He was part of the college football team as an end for the Minnesota Golden Gophers at a time when the team ranked first in the nation and overseen by coach Bernie Bierman. Greater success came in the discus throw with the track and field team. He won the NCAA Championship title in 1942 – Minnesota's first such champion. He also won the AAU national championship meet that year. After graduating college, he was drafted in the seventh round of the 1942 NFL draft by the Washington Redskins, but chose not to pursue professional football.

After graduating, he served in the United States Coast Guard for several years and was stationed Coast Guard Academy, New London, Connecticut in 1942 as a chief boatswain's mate. While at the Coast Guard Academy, he helped coach the football team. While stationed at Marine Corps Base Camp Lejeune as a coast guardsman, he was selected by the Associated Press as an end on the 1943 All-American Service team. He was discharged in the fall of 1945 as a chief specialist after 39 months of service.

After his military service, he then returned to education at Minnesota, starting a master's degree in physiology. It was in this second stint at the university that his discus throwing reached its peak. Under the guidance of Jim Kelly, Minnesota's track coach, he began experimenting with technique to find a better way of throwing the discus. Kelly credited Fitch with inventing a method of throwing called the "Minnesota Whip", which is now the accepted style worldwide. This was a development for the sport, which frequently still had rough earth in throwing circles. It was Fitch that mastered the technique first – on June 8, 1946, he threw a discus throw world record of 54.93 m (180 ft 2 3/4 in), bettering the mark of Adolfo Consolini by more than half a meter. He secured the United States discus title for a second time that year.

Gordien went on to follow in Fitch's footsteps by winning the NCAA title, and had three straight wins at the competition from 1946 to 1948. Fitch was unable to start international competition – amateur athletes were self-funded at the time and he needed a job to live – but Gordien went on to win the Pan American Games title in 1955 and two Olympic Games medals in 1948 and 1956. The younger Gordien became the more decorated of the two, winning seven national titles between 1947 and 1954, and broke the world record on four occasions, his best being 59.28 m (194 ft 5 3/4 in) in 1953.

Working with Gordien while continuing his studies, Fitch produced his masters thesis Mechanical analysis of the discus throw in 1951. He also served as an assistant college football coach for Indiana University. He asked the Indiana athletic director if he could stop coaching to focus on his doctoral studies. The director instead offered him a position to reorganise the school's golf course, which was becoming a financial drain. Fitch accepted the position, becoming the Indiana Hoosiers head coach for golf in the process.

As the head of Hoosiers golf, he transformed both the team and turned the course into a profitable venture. He led the Hoosiers to the Big Ten Conference runner-up spot in 1958 and they won the title for the first time in 1962, then again in 1968. The team topped the Big Ten championships four times in the 1970s. On top of his six conference titles, he also led the Hoosiers to the runner-up spot ten times between 1958 and 1984. He took the previously undecorated Hoosiers into NCAA Division I Men's Golf Championships competition on twelve occasions, with the team's best placing being sixth in 1974. Despite strong results in sporting achievements, Fitch emphasised academics first and foremost for student-athletes. His charges remembered Fitch pushing them hard both physically and academically, in the style of his previous coach Bernie Bierman. After his retirement in 1989, Fitch later reflected "I'm mighty proud that for 10 straight years my golf team led all athletic teams on campus in grade-point average and only three players didn't graduate in the 34 years I coached golf". His 32 years as Hoosiers golf head coach made him the longest-tenured coach in Indiana University history.

On August 29, 1942, Fitch married Helen Dichensheets. He died on April 5, 2003, in Bloomington, Indiana.

== Head coaching record ==
=== Football ===
Year	Team	Overall	Conference	Standing	Bowl/playoffs
Augustana (South Dakota) Vikings (North Central Conference) (1947)
1947	Augustana	3–5	2–3	5th	
Augustana:		3–5	2–3		
Total:		3–5			

Records
Preceded by Adolfo Consolini	Men's discus throw world record holder June 8, 1946 – October 10, 1948	Succeeded by Adolfo Consolini
