= Jesse J. and Mary F. Allee House =

Historic house in Iowa, United States

- U.S. National Register of Historic Places
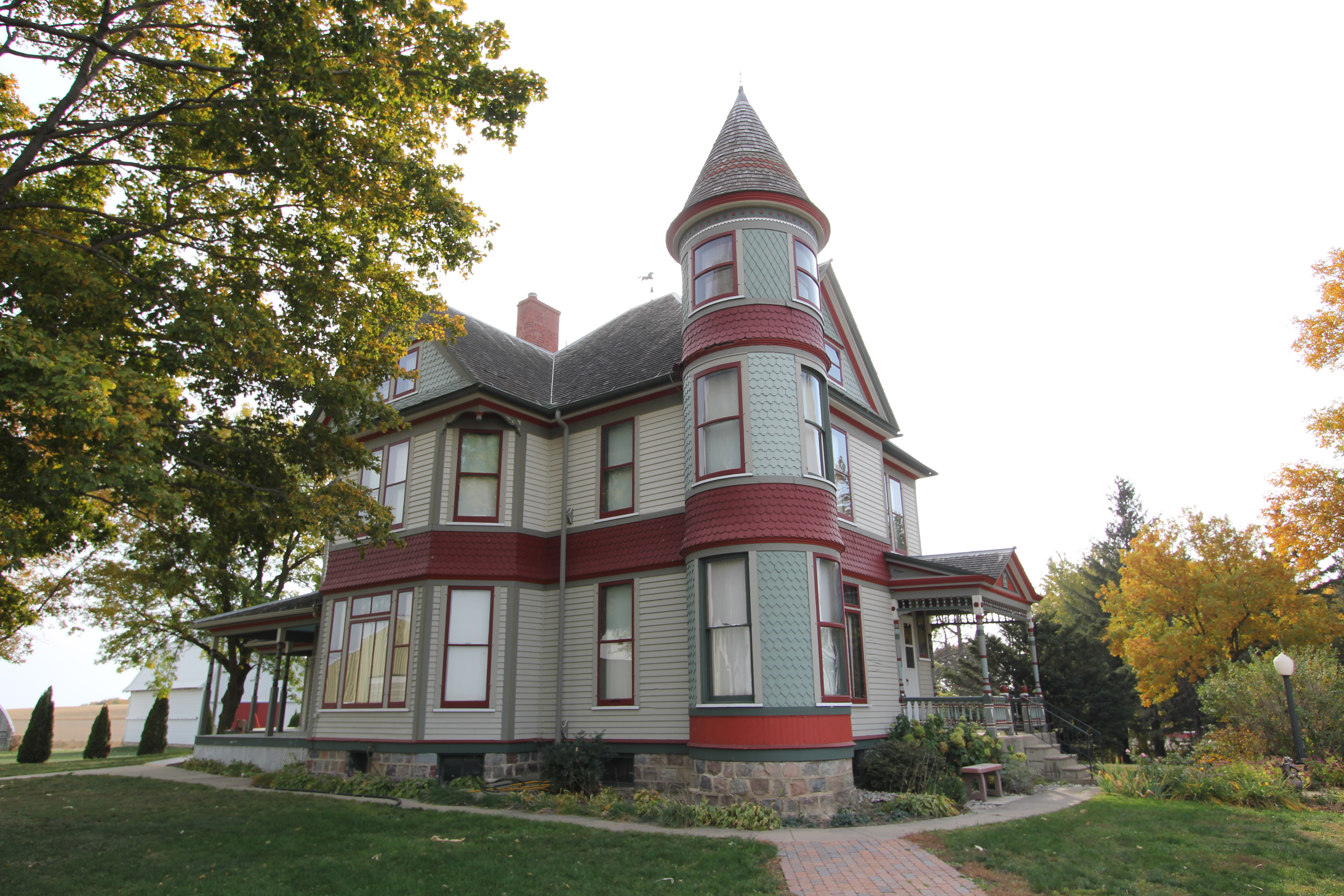

- Location within Iowa Location within the United States
- Nearest city: Newell, Iowa
- Coordinates: 42°35′22″N 95°0′33″W
- Area: 2 acres (0.81 ha)
- Built: 1891
- Built by: J.F. Cheney, Tim Richardson
- Architectural style: Queen Anne
- NRHP reference No.: 92000271
- Added to NRHP: March 26, 1992

The Jesse J. and Mary F. Allee House, also known as the Allee Mansion, is a historic house at 2020 640th Street in Newell, Iowa. The Queen Anne style Victorian house was built in 1891. The Newell Historical Society leased the house in 1988 and subsequently restored it to a Victorian appearance; the historical society now uses the mansion as a museum. The home was added to the National Register of Historic Places in 1992.
