= Varina, Iowa =

- City
- Location of Varina, Iowa
- Coordinates: 42°39′36″N 94°53′56″W
- Country: United States
- State: Iowa
- County: Pocahontas
- Incorporated: March 29, 1901

Area
  - Total: 0.22 sq mi (0.57 km^{2})
  - Land: 0.22 sq mi (0.57 km^{2})
  - Water: 0 sq mi (0.00 km^{2})
- Elevation: 1,260 ft (384 m)

Population (2020)
  - Total: 68
  - Density: 308.3/sq mi (119.03/km^{2})
- Time zone: UTC-6 (Central (CST))
  - Summer (DST): UTC-5 (CDT)
- ZIP code: 50593
- Area code: 712
- FIPS code: 19-80535
- GNIS feature ID: 0462545
- Website: varinaiowa.com

Varina is a city in Pocahontas County, Iowa, United States. The population was 68 at the time of the 2020 census.

== History ==
Varina got its start in the year 1899, following construction of the Chicago, Milwaukee and St. Paul Railway through that territory. It was named after Varina Farms, a plantation established by John Rolfe in Jamestown, Virginia.

== Geography ==
Varina is located at 42°39′36″N 94°53′56″W (42.659864, -94.898808).

According to the United States Census Bureau, the city has a total area of 0.27 square miles (0.70 km^{2}), all land.

== Demographics ==
Historical populations
Year	Pop.	±%
1910	183	—
1920	235	+28.4%
1930	184	−21.7%
1940	220	+19.6%
1950	144	−34.5%
1960	162	+12.5%
1970	140	−13.6%
1980	122	−12.9%
1990	102	−16.4%
2000	90	−11.8%
2010	71	−21.1%
2020	68	−4.2%
Source:"U.S. Census website". United States Census Bureau. and Iowa Data Center; Source: U.S. Decennial Census

=== 2020 census ===
As of the census of 2020, there were 68 people, 34 households, and 19 families residing in the city. The population density was 308.3 inhabitants per square mile (119.0/km^{2}). There were 38 housing units at an average density of 172.3 per square mile (66.5/km^{2}). The racial makeup of the city was 76.5% White, 0.0% Black or African American, 0.0% Native American, 0.0% Asian, 0.0% Pacific Islander, 13.2% from other races and 10.3% from two or more races. Hispanic or Latino persons of any race comprised 17.6% of the population.

Of the 34 households, 44.1% of which had children under the age of 18 living with them, 32.4% were married couples living together, 11.8% were cohabitating couples, 26.5% had a female householder with no spouse or partner present and 29.4% had a male householder with no spouse or partner present. 44.1% of all households were non-families. 35.3% of all households were made up of individuals, 20.6% had someone living alone who was 65 years old or older.

The median age in the city was 38.0 years. 33.8% of the residents were under the age of 20; 2.9% were between the ages of 20 and 24; 20.6% were from 25 and 44; 25.0% were from 45 and 64; and 17.6% were 65 years of age or older. The gender makeup of the city was 50.0% male and 50.0% female.

=== 2010 census ===
At the 2010 census there were 71 people in 30 households, including 17 families, in the city. The population density was 263.0 inhabitants per square mile (101.5/km^{2}). There were 35 housing units at an average density of 129.6 per square mile (50.0/km^{2}). The racial makup of the city was 97.2% White and 2.8% African American. Hispanic or Latino of any race were 7.0%.

Of the 30 households 30.0% had children under the age of 18 living with them, 43.3% were married couples living together, 6.7% had a female householder with no husband present, 6.7% had a male householder with no wife present, and 43.3% were non-families. 43.3% of households were one person and 20% were one person aged 65 or older. The average household size was 2.37 and the average family size was 3.35.

The median age was 35.5 years. 36.6% of residents were under the age of 18; 0.0% were between the ages of 18 and 24; 19.7% were from 25 to 44; 22.4% were from 45 to 64; and 21.1% were 65 or older. The gender makeup of the city was 53.5% male and 46.5% female.

=== 2000 census ===
As of the census of 2000, there were 90 people in 36 households, including 25 families, in the city. The population density was 364.9 inhabitants per square mile (140.9/km^{2}). There were 44 housing units at an average density of 178.4 per square mile (68.9/km^{2}). The racial makup of the city was 100.00% White.

Of the 36 households 27.8% had children under the age of 18 living with them, 52.8% were married couples living together, 11.1% had a female householder with no husband present, and 27.8% were non-families. 22.2% of households were one person and 11.1% were one person aged 65 or older. The average household size was 2.50 and the average family size was 2.85.

The age distribution was 23.3% under the age of 18, 5.6% from 18 to 24, 27.8% from 25 to 44, 20.0% from 45 to 64, and 23.3% 65 or older. The median age was 40 years. For every 100 females, there were 114.3 males. For every 100 females age 18 and over, there were 122.6 males.

The median household income was $35,469 and the median family income was $35,156. Males had a median income of $24,688 versus $18,750 for females. The per capita income for the city was $13,611. There were 9.7% of families and 12.0% of the population living below the poverty line, including 47.4% of under eighteens and none of those over 64.

== Education ==
Varina is served by the Newell-Fonda Community School District, which operates Newell-Fonda High School in Newell. It was created on July 1, 1993, as a consolidation of the Fonda Community School District and the Newell-Providence Community School District.

== Churches ==
There is a Catholic and Methodist Church in Varina. The Catholic church is Saint Columbkilles and the Methodist is First United Methodist Church.

== Organizations ==
American Legion Post 588 W.D. Steiner is located in Varina.
