= Newell-Fonda Community School District =

Public school district in Newell, Iowa, United States

Coordinates: 42.605500°N 94.997944°W

Location
- Newell, Iowa Buena Vista, Pocahontas, Calhoun, and Sac counties United States
- Coordinates: 42.605500, -94.997944

District information
- Type: Local school district
- Grades: K-12
- Established: 1993
- Superintendent: Jeff Dicks
- Schools: 3
- Budget: $8,889,000 (2017-18)
- NCES District ID: 1920580

Students and staff
- Students: 578 (2022-23)
- Teachers: 41.57 FTE
- Staff: 60.48 FTE
- Student–teacher ratio: 13.90
- Athletic conference: Twin Lakes
- District mascot: Mustangs
- Colors: Royal Blue, Silver, and White

Other information
- Website: www.newell-fonda.k12.ia.us

Newell-Fonda Community School District is a rural public school district headquartered in Newell, Iowa.

Located in sections of Buena Vista, Pocahontas, Calhoun, and Sac counties, it serves Newell, Fonda, and Varina. All of the Education and Sports organizations are located in Newell except for the baseball and softball fields, which are located in Fonda.

As of 2018, it has about 500 students. It operates Newell-Fonda High School, Newell-Fonda Middle School and Newell-Fonda Elementary School. The district teaches grades Pk-12. The superintendent is Jeff Dicks.

== History ==
It was created on July 1, 1993, as a consolidation of the Fonda Community School District and the Newell-Providence Community School District. In 2014, a new section of the school was added. It included a playground, gym, classrooms, and a library.

== See also ==
- List of school districts in Iowa
