= Newell-Fonda High School =

Public secondary school in Newell, Iowa, United States

Location
- 205 S. Clark St. Newell, Iowa 50568
- 42.605°N 94.998°W

Information
- Type: Public secondary
- School district: Newell-Fonda Community School District
- Superintendent: Jeff Dick
- Principal: Alynn Coppock
- Teaching staff: 11.93 (FTE)
- Enrollment: 139 (2023-2024)
- Student to teacher ratio: 11.65
- Colors: Royal blue, Silver, and White
- Athletics conference: Twin Lakes
- Mascot: Mustangs
- Website: www.newell-fonda.k12.ia.us

Newell-Fonda High School is a public high school, part of the Newell-Fonda Community School District. It is located in the city of Newell, Iowa, located in Buena Vista County.

The school serves students from Newell, Fonda, Varina, and Sulphur Springs.

== Education ==
Newell-Fonda High School has a 1:8 teacher to student ratio. According to the Newell Fonda website, 73.4% of students are Caucasian, while 26.6% are Hispanic, and 1% are Russian. Of all students in the Newell-Fonda Community School District, 30% are eligible for the free or reduced-price lunch program. Higher level college courses can be taken from Iowa Central Community College and at Buena Vista University. Newell-Fonda has a National Honor Society program as well as an award-winning FFA (Future Farmers of America) program.

Students at Newell-Fonda have traditionally scored above the state average in the ITEDS (Iowa Tests of Educational Development). In 2006, students scored 82% on the math portion of the tests, as compared to the state average of 78%. On the reading portion of the ITED tests, Newell-Fonda students scored 79% as compared to the state average of 78%.

Jeff Dick is the Superintendent of the Newell-Fonda Community School District.

== Sports ==
The Mustangs compete in the Twin Lakes Conference.

=== Boys' basketball ===
Newell-Fonda has won four State Titles in nine appearances since 1991 (1991, 1997, 1999, 2000). The Senior Class of 2000 was responsible for three state titles in their four years of high school. They hold the 9th longest winning streak in Iowa Boys' Basketball history, with 49 consecutive wins (including postseason games) from 1996 through 1998.

Newell-Fonda State Basketball Appearances
Year	Outcome	Record	Opponent	Score	State Champion
1991	State Champions	24-1	vs. IKM Manilla	76-55	Newell-Fonda
1997	State Champions	27-0	vs. Lynnville-Sully	61-51	Newell-Fonda
1999	State Champions	26-0	vs. DM Christian	55-52	Newell-Fonda
2000	State Champions	26-1	vs. Boyden-Hull	58-57 (2OT)	Newell-Fonda

=== Girls' basketball ===
State Champions - 2015,2019, 2020, 2021 and 2026.

=== Football ===
The 2014-2015 team won the state championship against Fremont-Mills and took their first football state title.

Newell-Fonda has a record of 70-18 from 1997 through 2006. They have been ranked within the top 10 in the Des Moines Register's state rankings for virtually every week of that reign.

=== Softball ===
In 2008, the Newell-Fonda Mustangs softball team to become the first female sports team to win a championship in Newell-Fonda history.

== Extra-Curricular activities ==
Students at Newell-Fonda are able to participate in Speech, Student Government, Drill Team, Band, Choir, All School Play, Family and Consumer Science Club, and a volunteer Meals on Wheels delivery program. Many students are also part of the Newell-Fonda National Honor Society.

== See also ==
- List of high schools in Iowa
