= Sulphur Springs, Iowa =

- Unincorporated community
- Location within Iowa
- Coordinates: 42°37′19″N 95°05′50″W
- Country: United States
- State: Iowa
- County: Buena Vista
- Elevation: 1,312 ft (400 m)
- Time zone: UTC-6 (Central (CST))
  - Summer (DST): UTC-5 (CDT)
- Area code: 712
- GNIS feature ID: 462074

Sulphur Springs is an unincorporated community in Buena Vista County, located in the U.S. state of Iowa.

== History ==
Sulphur Springs' population was 85 in 1900, and 115 in 1925. The population was 50 in 1940.

== Geography ==
The village is located between Storm Lake and Newell, 6 kilometres (3.7 mi) east of U.S. Route 71. A grain elevator complex owned by a farmers' cooperative is in Sulphur Springs, located on the Canadian National Railway mainline from Chicago to Sioux City, which runs through Sulphur Springs.

== See also ==
- List of unincorporated communities in Iowa
