= Newell, Iowa =

- City
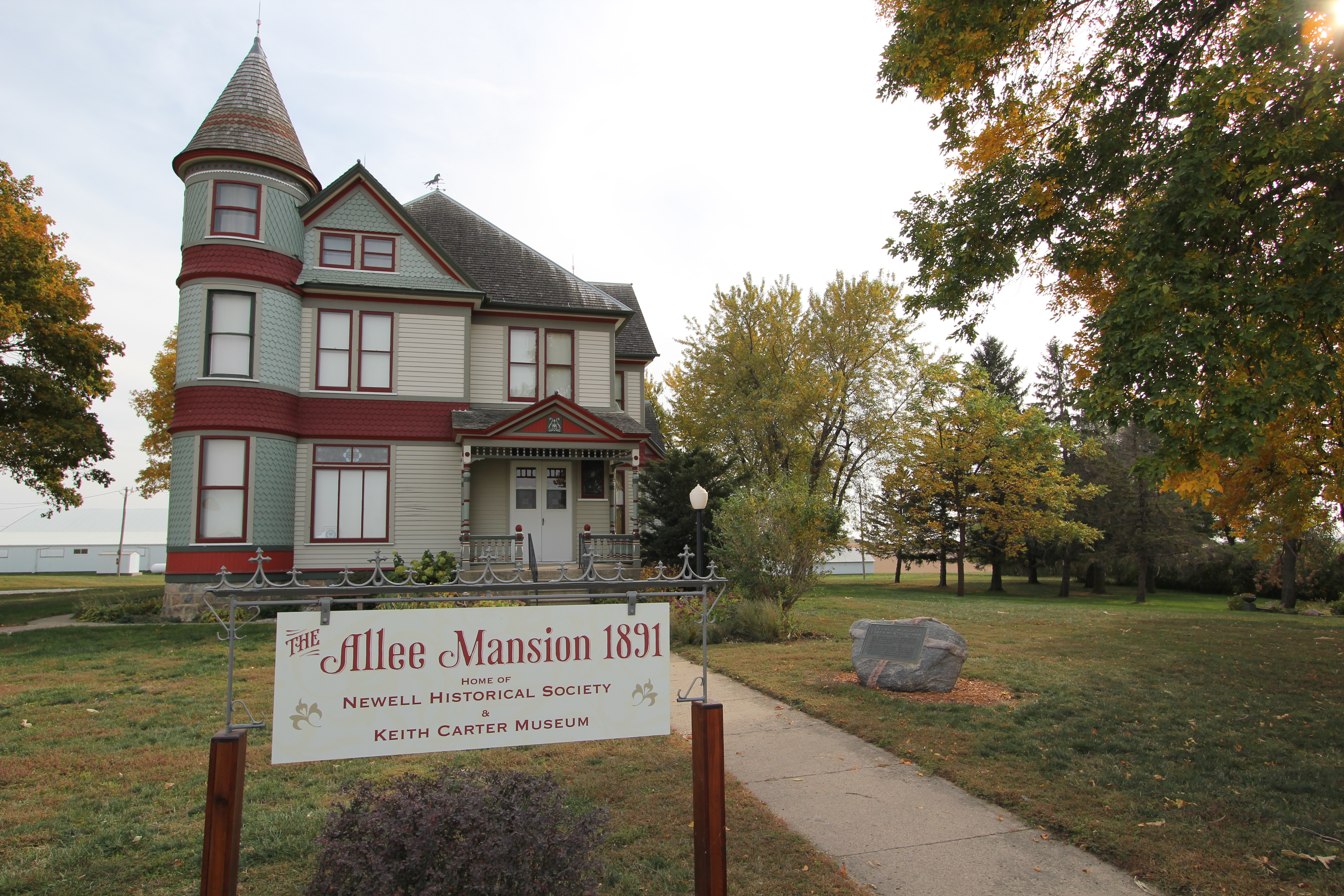
- Allee Mansion is listed on the National Register of Historic Places

- Location of Newell, Iowa
- Coordinates: 42°36′35″N 95°00′03″W
- Country: USA
- State: Iowa
- County: Buena Vista
- Established: January 2015

Area
  - Total: 1.26 sq mi (3.27 km^{2})
  - Land: 1.26 sq mi (3.27 km^{2})
  - Water: 0 sq mi (0.00 km^{2})
- Elevation: 1,257 ft (383 m)

Population (2020)
  - Total: 906
  - Density: 720/sq mi (277/km^{2})
- Time zone: UTC-6 (Central (CST))
  - Summer (DST): UTC-5 (CDT)
- ZIP code: 50568
- Area code: 712
- FIPS code: 19-55965
- GNIS feature ID: 2395223
- Website: www.newelliowa.com

Newell is a city in Buena Vista County, Iowa, United States. The population was 906 according to the 2020 census.

== History ==
Newell was established in 1870 as a station for the Dubuque and Sioux City Railroad, and was named after John Newell, then Vice President of the Dubuque and Sioux City Railroad. Newell was incorporated in 1876.

== Geography ==
According to the United States Census Bureau, the city has a total area of 1.27 square miles (3.29 km^{2}), all land.

== Demographics ==
Historical populations
Year	Pop.	±%
1880	348	—
1890	540	+55.2%
1900	762	+41.1%
1910	728	−4.5%
1920	809	+11.1%
1930	812	+0.4%
1940	854	+5.2%
1950	884	+3.5%
1960	893	+1.0%
1970	877	−1.8%
1980	913	+4.1%
1990	1,089	+19.3%
2000	887	−18.5%
2010	876	−1.2%
2020	906	+3.4%
Source:"U.S. Census website". United States Census Bureau. and Iowa Data Center; Source: U.S. Decennial Census

=== 2020 census ===
As of the census of 2020, there were 906 people, 359 households, and 240 families residing in the city. The population density was 717.4 inhabitants per square mile (277.0/km^{2}). There were 380 housing units at an average density of 300.9 per square mile (116.2/km^{2}). The racial makeup of the city was 85.4% White, 0.0% Black or African American, 0.4% Native American, 0.4% Asian, 3.3% Pacific Islander, 2.5% from other races and 7.8% from two or more races. Hispanic or Latino persons of any race comprised 8.5% of the population.

Of the 359 households, 32.9% of which had children under the age of 18 living with them, 46.2% were married couples living together, 7.5% were cohabitating couples, 25.1% had a female householder with no spouse or partner present and 21.2% had a male householder with no spouse or partner present. 33.1% of all households were non-families. 29.2% of all households were made up of individuals, 12.0% had someone living alone who was 65 years old or older.

The median age in the city was 36.8 years. 29.6% of the residents were under the age of 20; 4.9% were between the ages of 20 and 24; 24.0% were from 25 and 44; 24.6% were from 45 and 64; and 17.0% were 65 years of age or older. The gender makeup of the city was 50.0% male and 50.0% female.

=== 2010 census ===
As of the census of 2010, there were 876 people, 356 households, and 225 families living in the city. The population density was 689.8 inhabitants per square mile (266.3/km^{2}). There were 377 housing units at an average density of 296.9 per square mile (114.6/km^{2}). The racial makeup of the city was 95.5% White, 0.3% African American, 0.1% Native American, 0.3% Asian, 2.6% from other races, and 1.0% from two or more races. Hispanic or Latino of any race were 4.2% of the population.

There were 356 households, of which 30.1% had children under the age of 18 living with them, 51.7% were married couples living together, 9.6% had a female householder with no husband present, 2.0% had a male householder with no wife present, and 36.8% were non-families. 34.0% of all households were made up of individuals, and 15.5% had someone living alone who was 65 years of age or older. The average household size was 2.34 and the average family size was 3.01.

The median age in the city was 41.1 years. 25.8% of residents were under the age of 18; 6.5% were between the ages of 18 and 24; 22.2% were from 25 to 44; 25% were from 45 to 64; and 20.5% were 65 years of age or older. The gender makeup of the city was 48.2% male and 51.8% female.

=== 2000 census ===
As of the census of 2000, there were 887 people, 361 households, and 237 families living in the city. The population density was 706.9 inhabitants per square mile (272.9/km^{2}). There were 381 housing units at an average density of 303.6 per square mile (117.2/km^{2}). The racial makeup of the city was 97.29% White, 0.11% African American, 0.23% Native American, 0.11% Asian, 1.92% from other races, and 0.34% from two or more races. Hispanic or Latino of any race were 3.16% of the population.

There were 361 households, out of which 30.5% had children under the age of 18 living with them, 54.3% were married couples living together, 8.3% had a female householder with no husband present, and 34.1% were non-families. 30.7% of all households were made up of individuals, and 15.5% had someone living alone who was 65 years of age or older. The average household size was 2.32 and the average family size was 2.91.

24.6% were under the age of 18, 4.6% from 18 to 24, 25.1% from 25 to 44, 17.9% from 45 to 64, and 27.7% were 65 years of age or older. The median age was 42 years. For every 100 females, there were 91.2 males. For every 100 females age 18 and over, there were 86.9 males.

The median income for a household in the city was $31,204, and the median income for a family was $33,594. Males had a median income of $29,886 versus $19,286 for females. The per capita income for the city was $13,554. About 9.2% of families and 8.7% of the population were below the poverty line, including 10.6% of those under age 18 and 6.4% of those age 65 or over.

== Education ==
Newell is served by the Newell-Fonda Community School District, which operates Newell-Fonda High School in Newell.

== Notable people ==
- George L. Dobson (1861-1919). Iowa Secretary of State, lived in Newell and served as mayor of Newell.
