= List of F4 and EF4 tornadoes (2010–2019) =

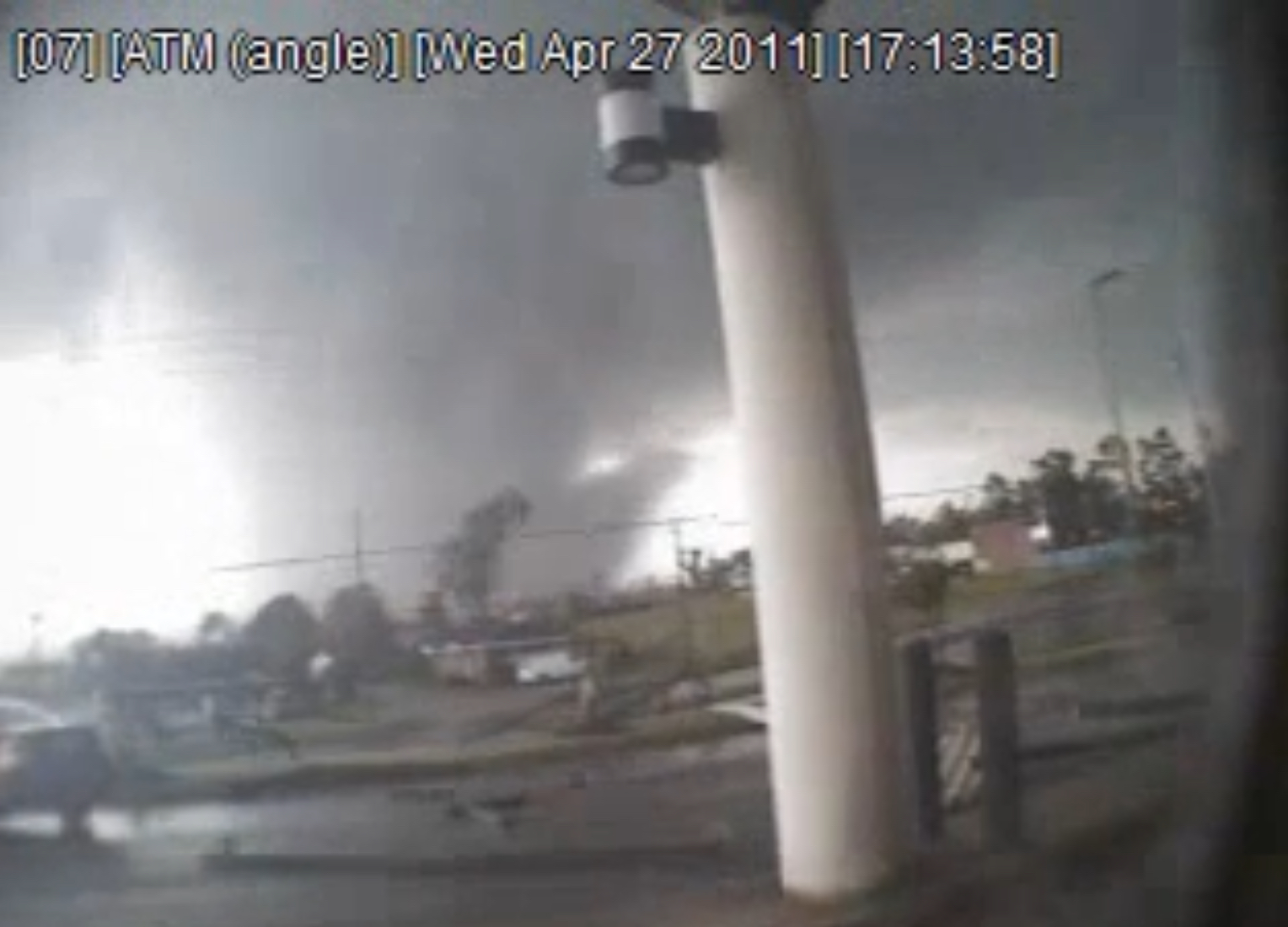
The Tuscaloosa EF4 tornado seen by a CCTV camera in downtown Tuscaloosa, Alabama on April 27, 2011.

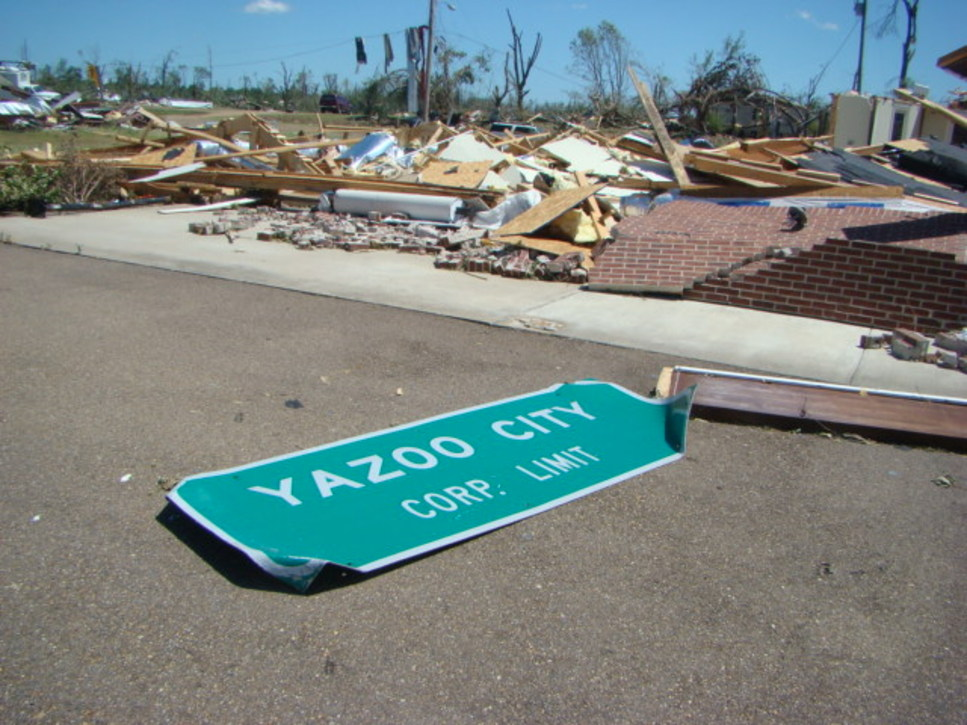
A sign on the ground near a destroyed house in Yazoo City, Mississippi after the 2010 Yazoo City tornado.

EF4 Tornadoes in the US, 2010–2019

This is a list of tornadoes that have been officially or unofficially labeled as F4, EF4, IF4, or an equivalent rating during the 2010s decade. These scales – the Fujita scale, the Enhanced Fujita scale, the International Fujita scale, and the TORRO tornado intensity scale – attempt to estimate the intensity of a tornado by classifying the damage caused to natural features and man-made structures in the tornado's path.

Tornadoes are among the most violent known meteorological phenomena. Each year, more than 2,000 tornadoes are recorded worldwide, with the vast majority occurring in North America and Europe. To assess the intensity of these events, meteorologist Ted Fujita devised a method to estimate maximum wind speeds within tornadic storms based on the damage caused; this became known as the Fujita scale. The scale ranks tornadoes from F0 to F5, with F0 being the least intense and F5 being the most intense. F4 tornadoes were estimated to have had maximum winds between 207 and 260 mph (333 and 418 km/h) and are considered violent tornadoes, along with F5 tornadoes. (Note: The winds estimated by the Fujita Scale are estimated values and have not been verified scientifically.)

Following two particularly devastating tornadoes in 1997 and 1999, engineers questioned the reliability of the Fujita scale. Ultimately, a new scale was devised that took into account 28 different damage indicators; this became known as the Enhanced Fujita scale. With building design and structural integrity taken more into account, winds in an EF4 tornado were estimated to between 166 and 200 mph (267 and 322 km/h). The Enhanced Fujita scale is used predominantly in North America. Most of Europe, on the other hand, uses the TORRO tornado intensity scale (or T-Scale), which ranks tornado intensity between T0 and T11; F4/EF4 tornadoes are approximately equivalent to T8 to T9 on the T-Scale. Tornadoes rated IF4 on the International Fujita scale are also included on this list. Violent tornadoes, those rated F4/EF4 and F5/EF5 are rare and only make up 2% of all recorded tornadoes.

== List ==
In the 2010s decade, 71 tornadoes were rated F4/EF4. 59 of these occurred in the United States, five occurred in China, two in Brazil with one occurring in each Australia, Canada, Cuba, Italy, Russia, and South Africa for a total of 12 F4/EF4 tornadoes outside of the United States. 70 tornadoes were rated EF4 with Italy's and South Africa's only violent tornadoes during the decade being rated F4.

The year 2018, notably, did not feature any violent (EF4, or stronger) tornadoes in the United States – marking the only such year for the country in at least the last 75 years (1950–2024). Two violent tornadoes did, however, occur in other parts of the globe during 2018 – one in Canada and another in Brazil.

Images of F4/EF4/IF4 damage from 2010–2019

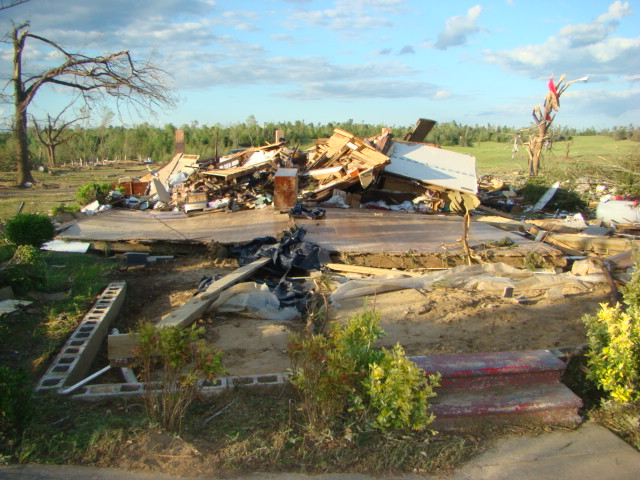
Franklin, MS

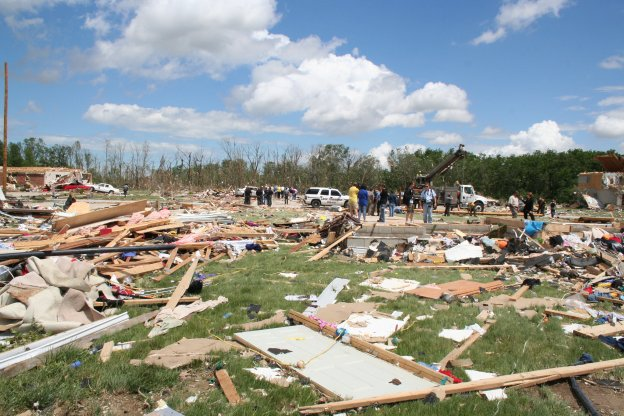
Millbury, OH

Bowdle, SD

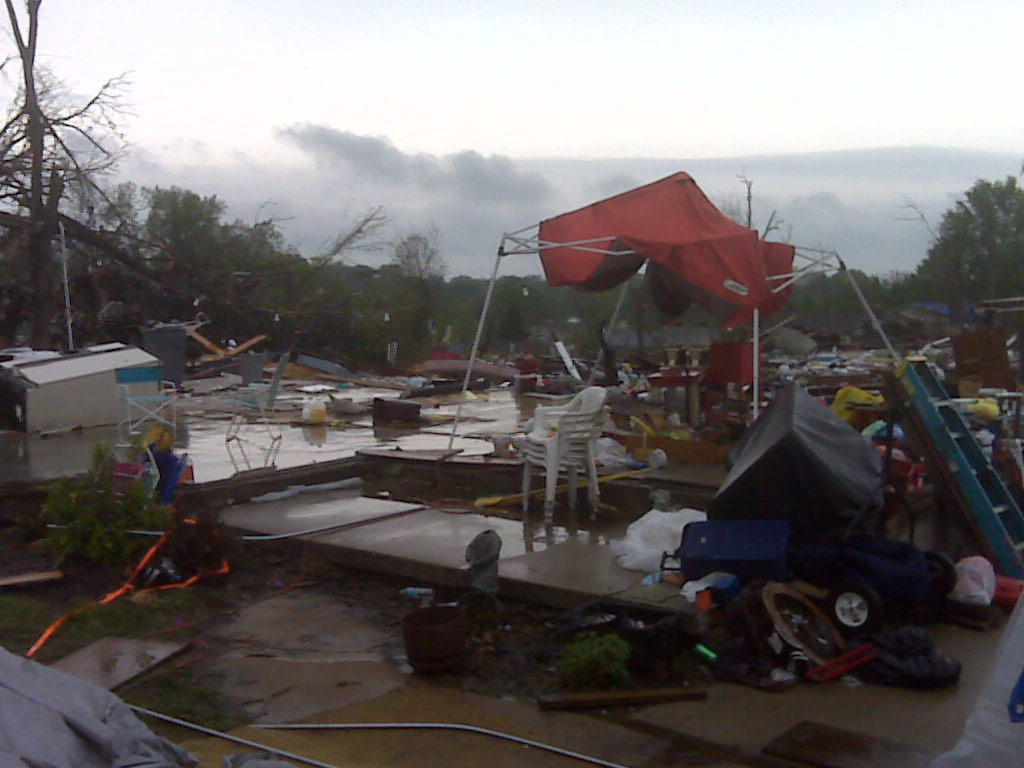
St. Louis, MO

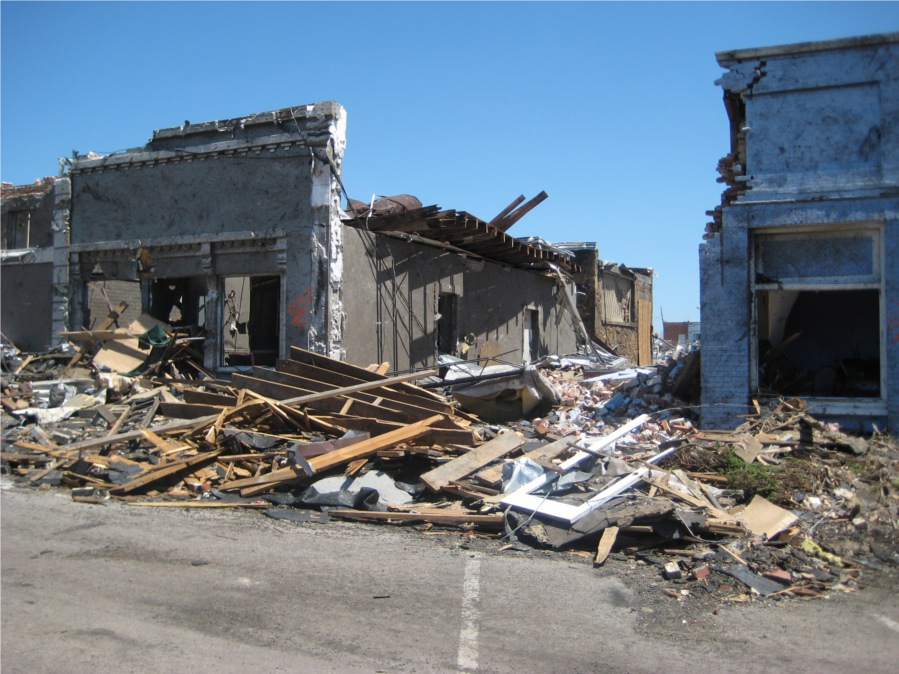
Cullman, AL

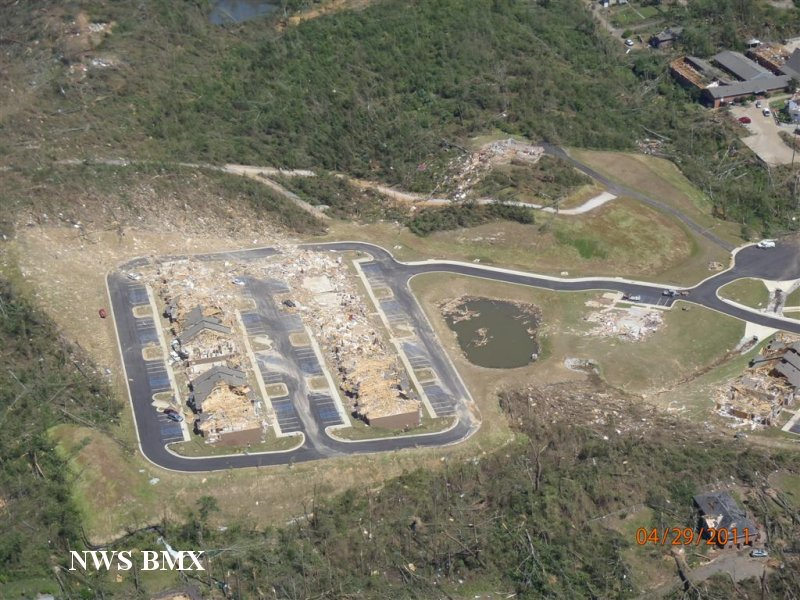
Tuscaloosa, AL

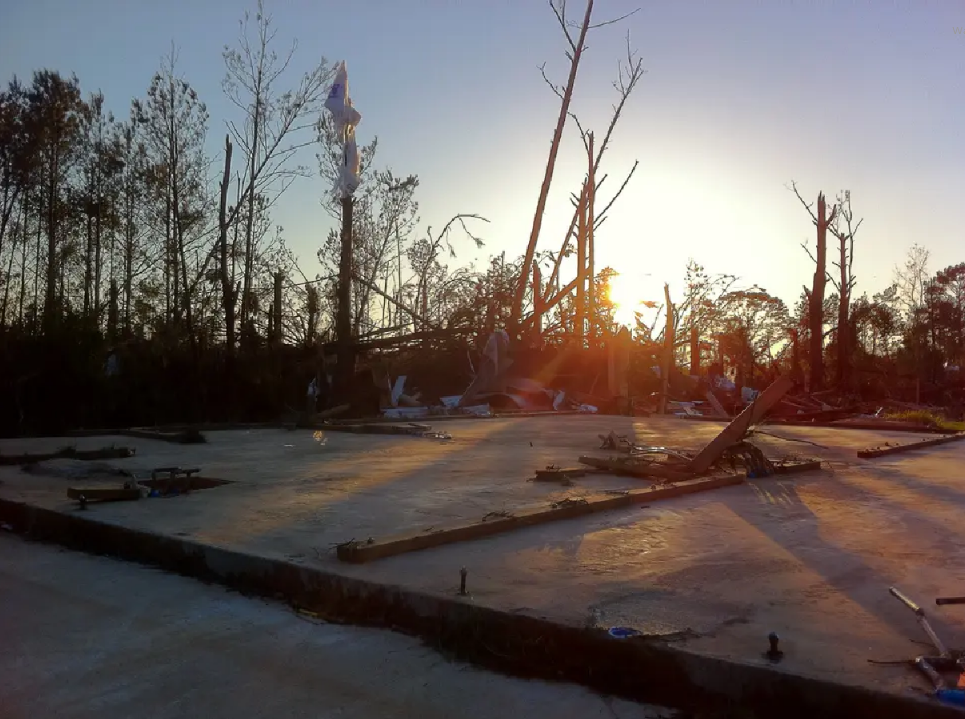
Enterprise, MS

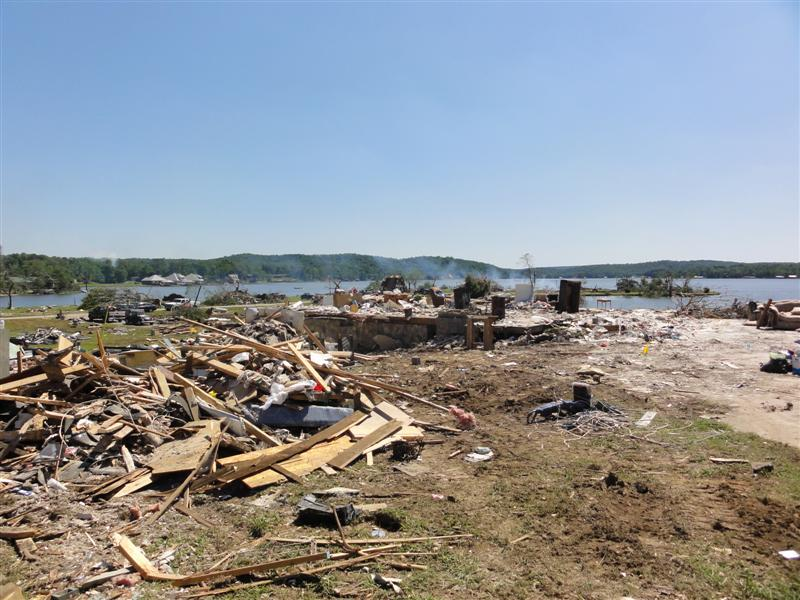
Shoal Creek Valley, AL

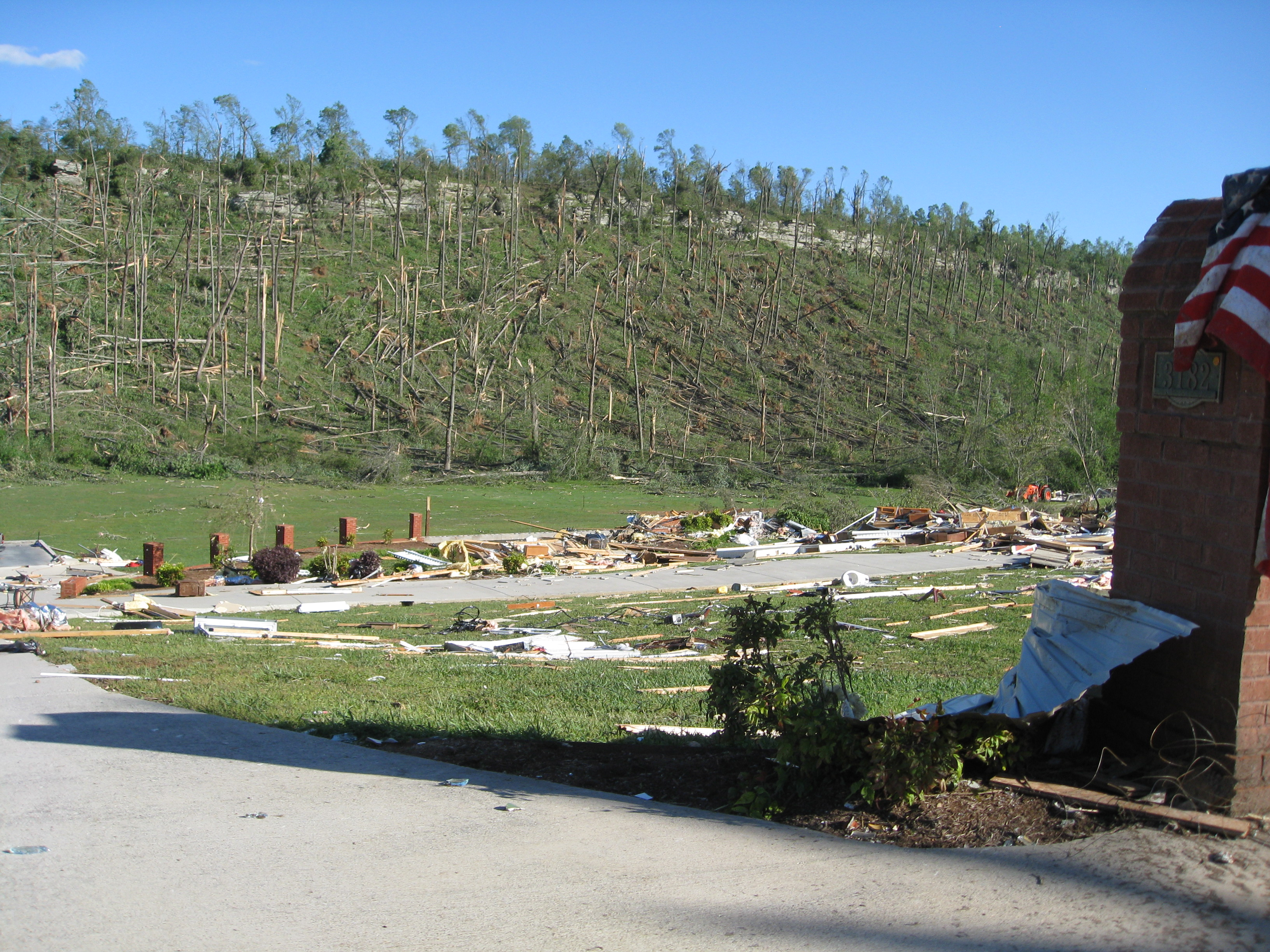
Ringgold, GA

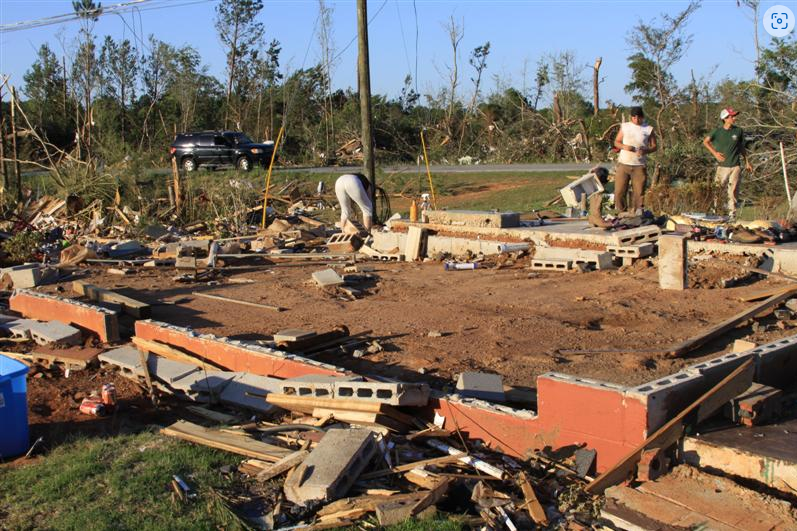
Lake Martin, AL

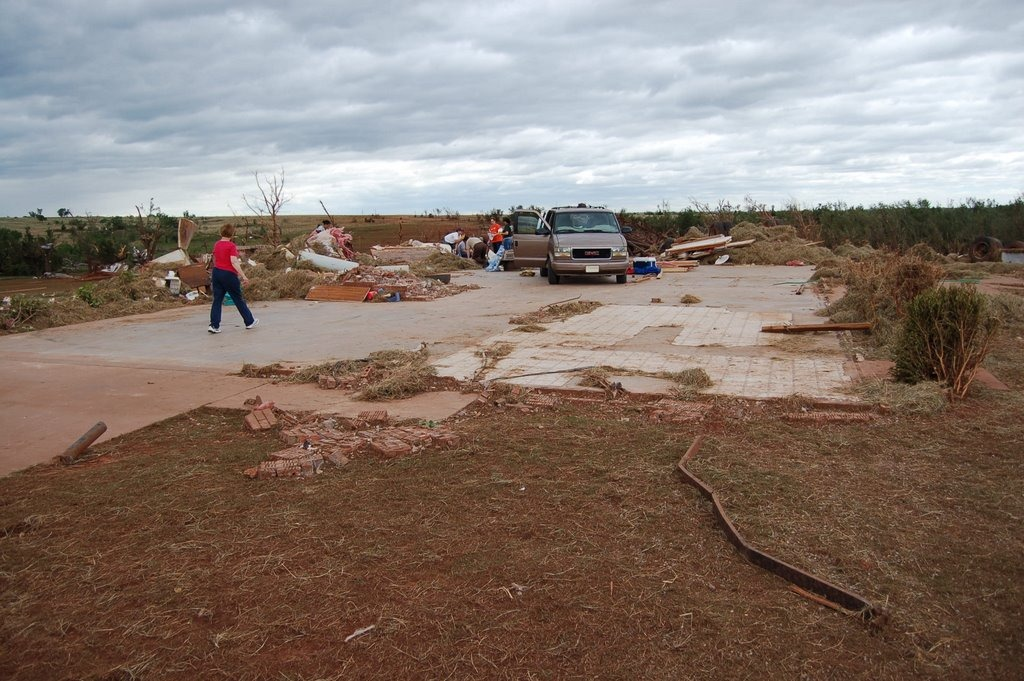
Chickasha, OK

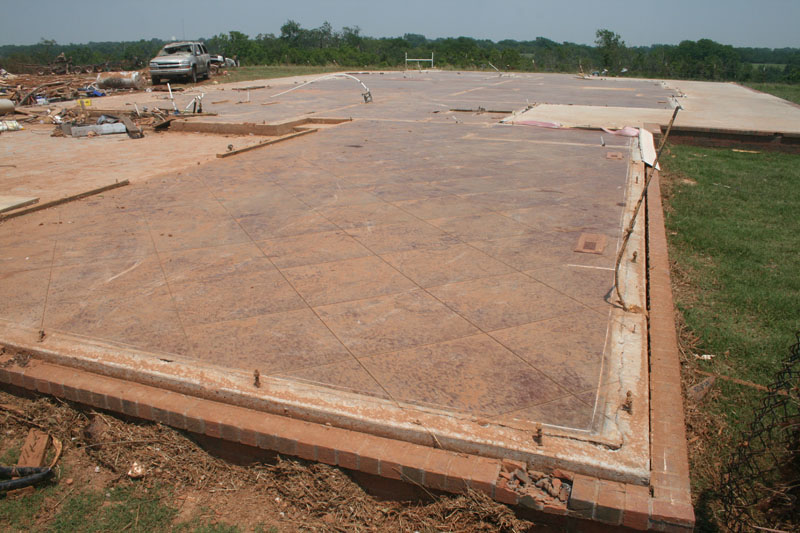
Goldsby, OK

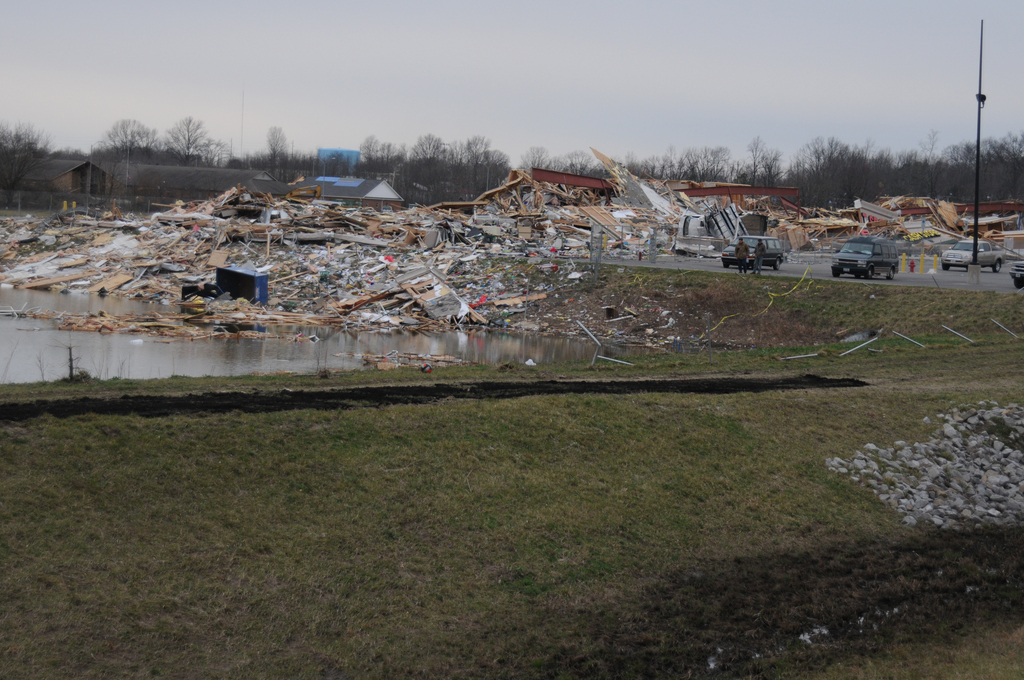
Harrisburg, IL

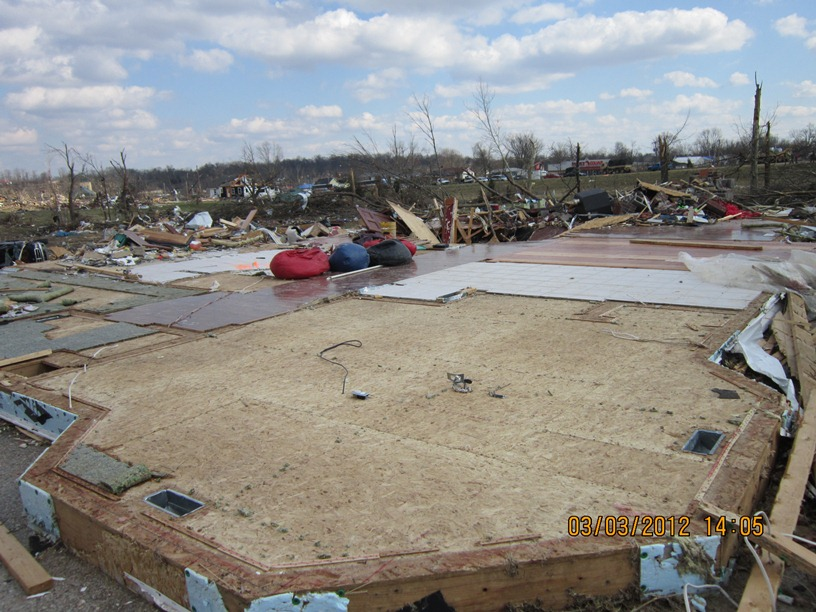
Henryville, IN

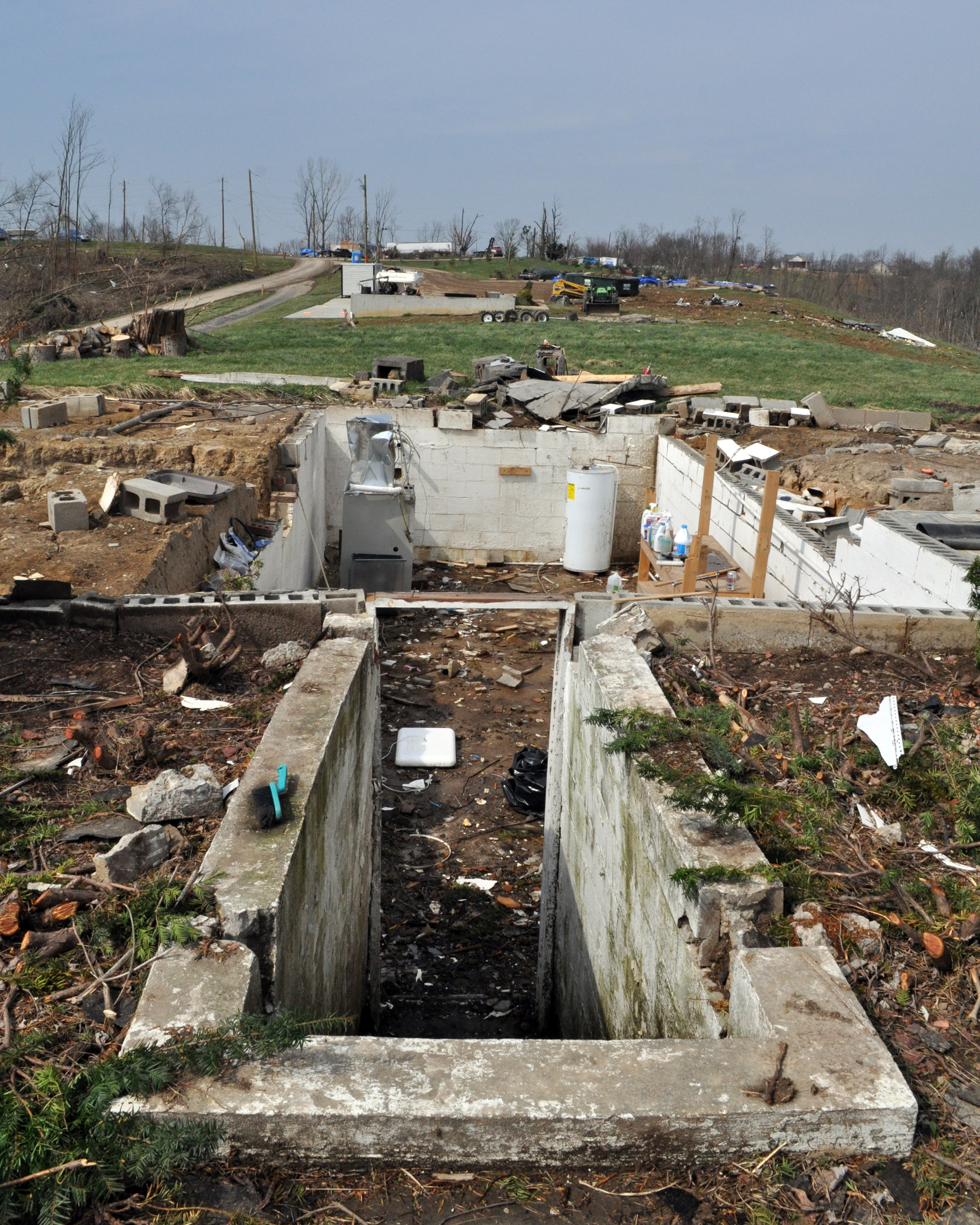
Crittenden, KY

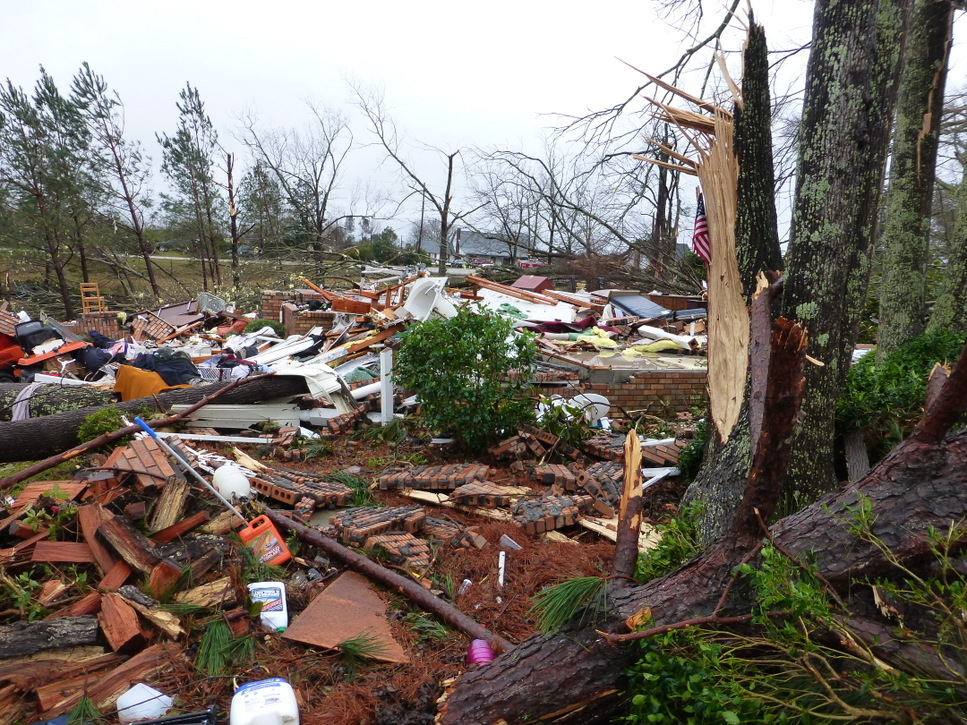
Hattiesburg, MS

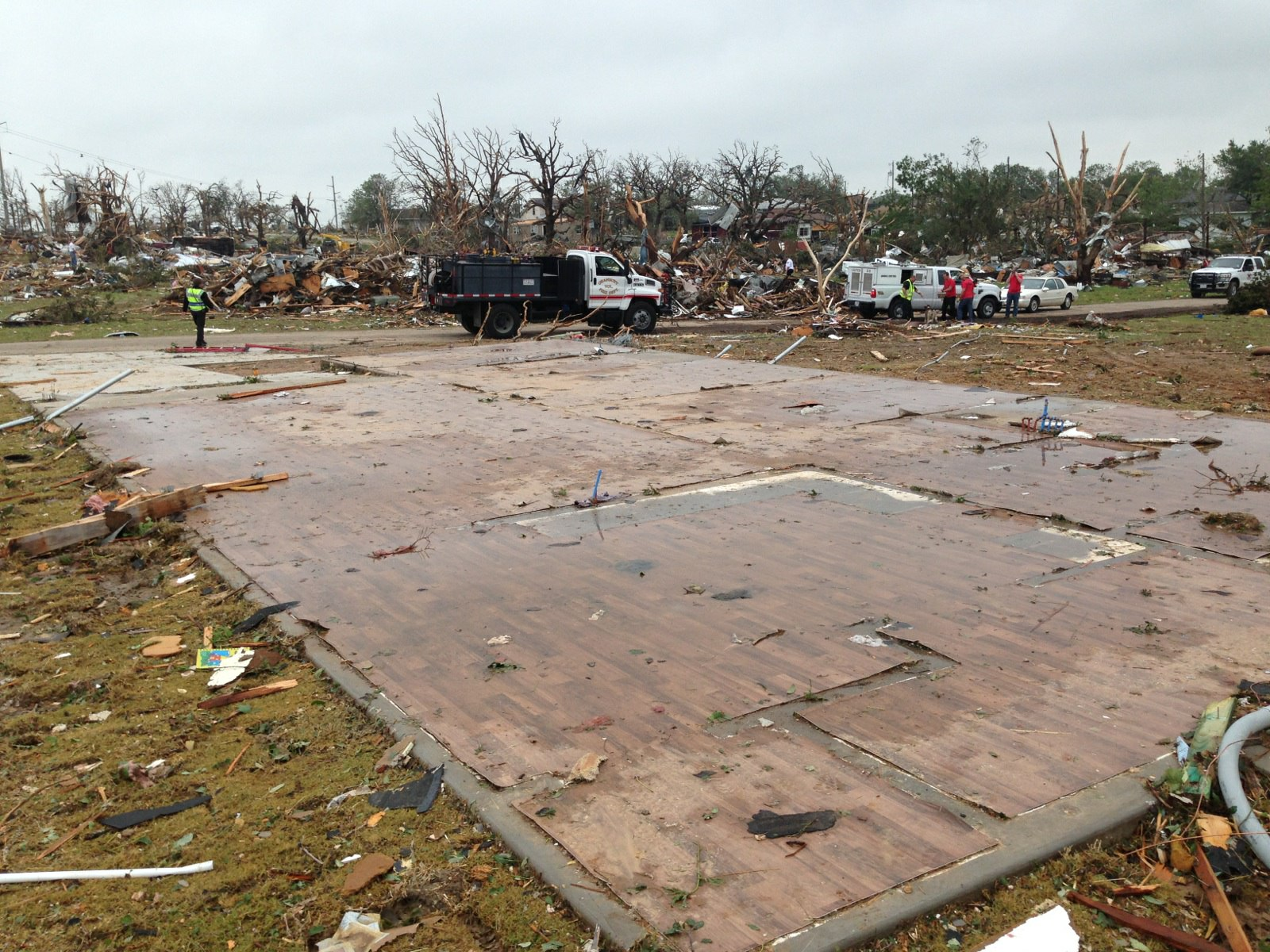
Granbury, TX

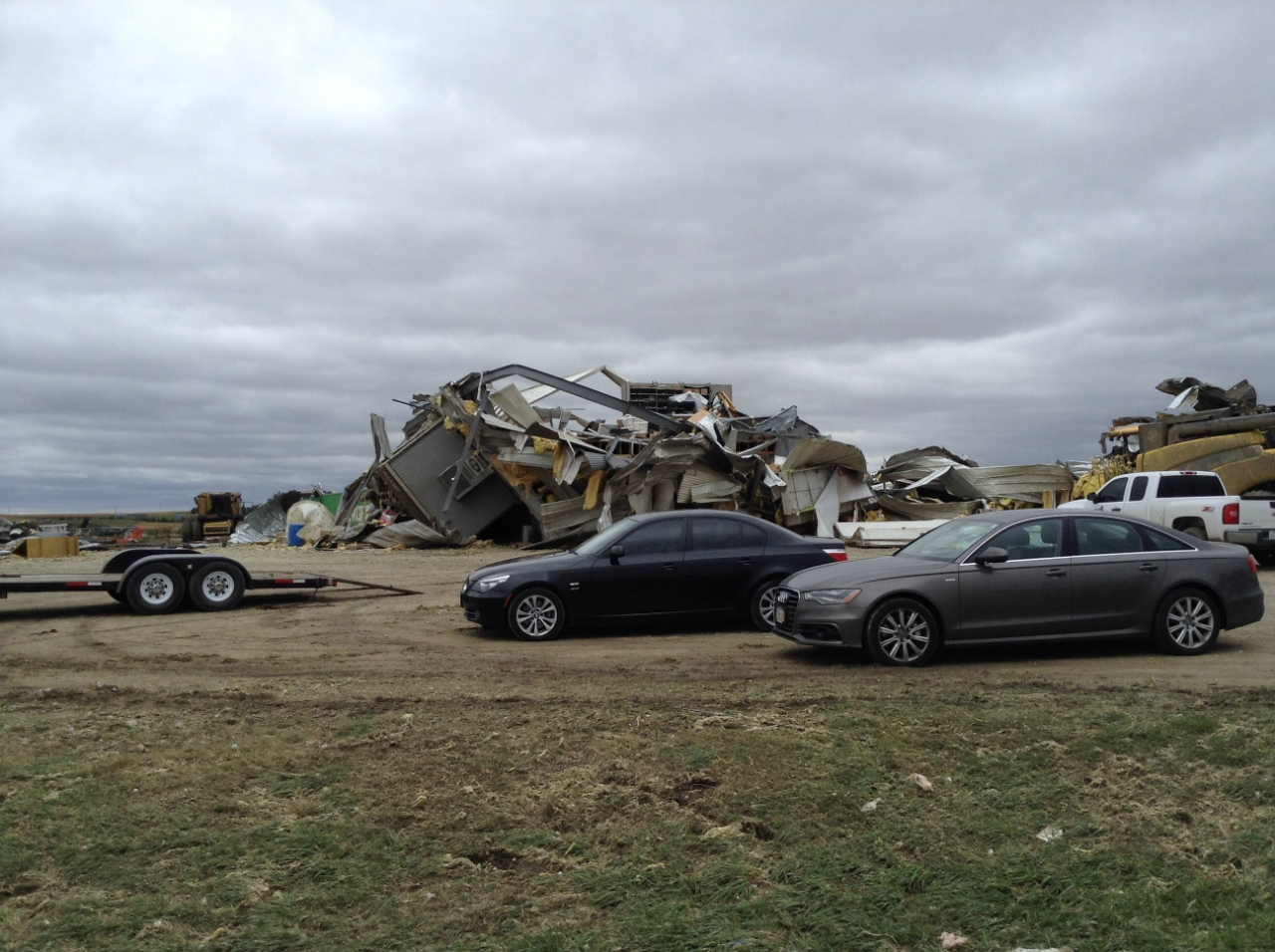
Wayne, NE

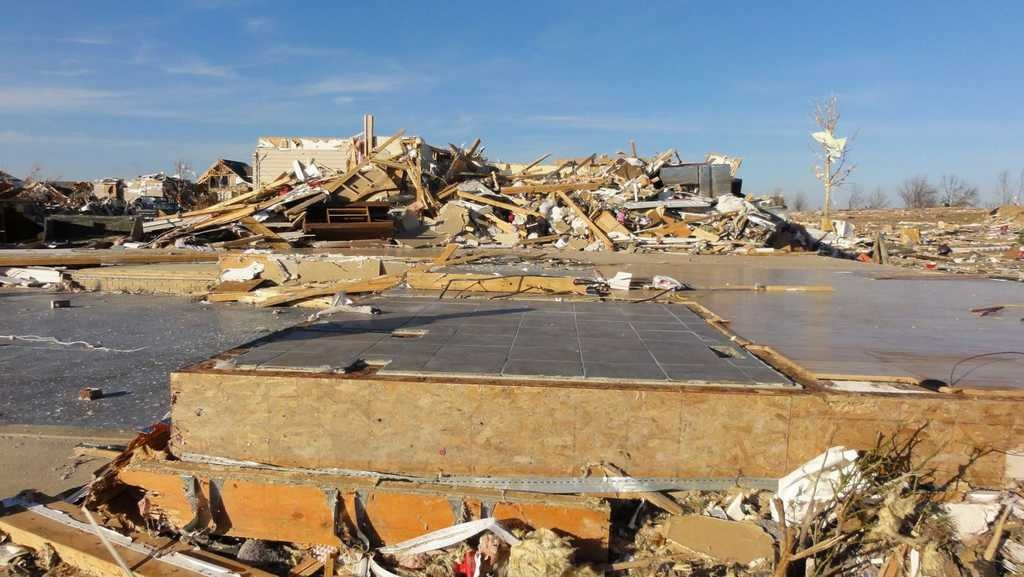
Washington, IL

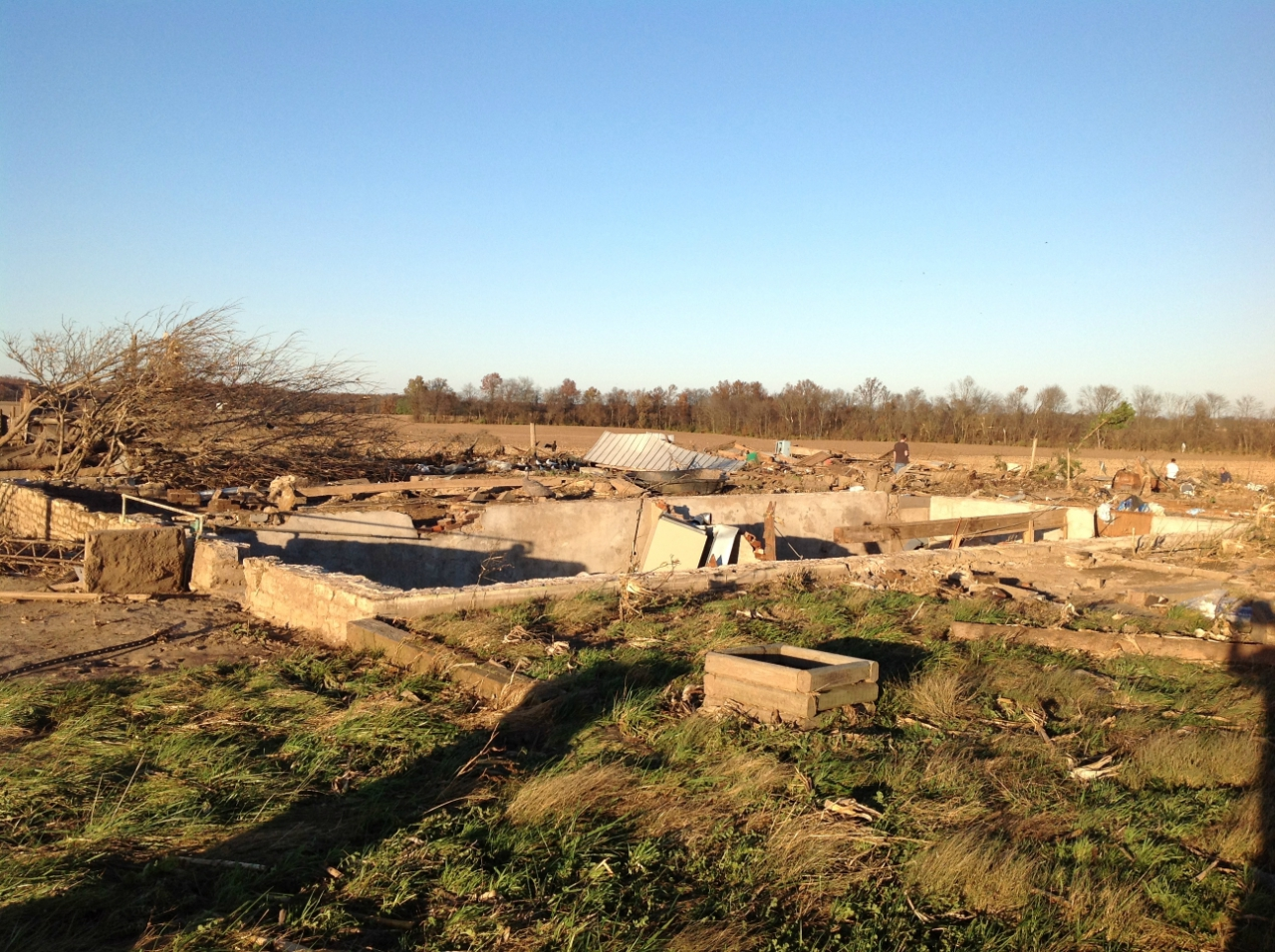
New Minden, IL

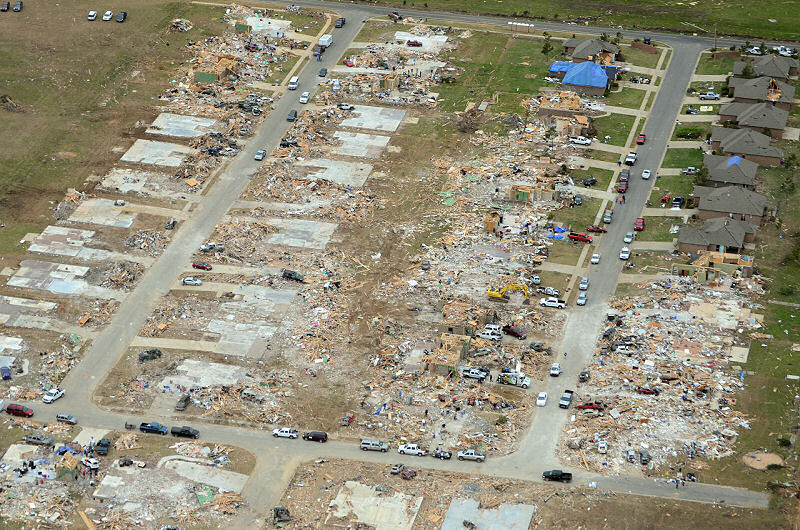
Vilonia, AR

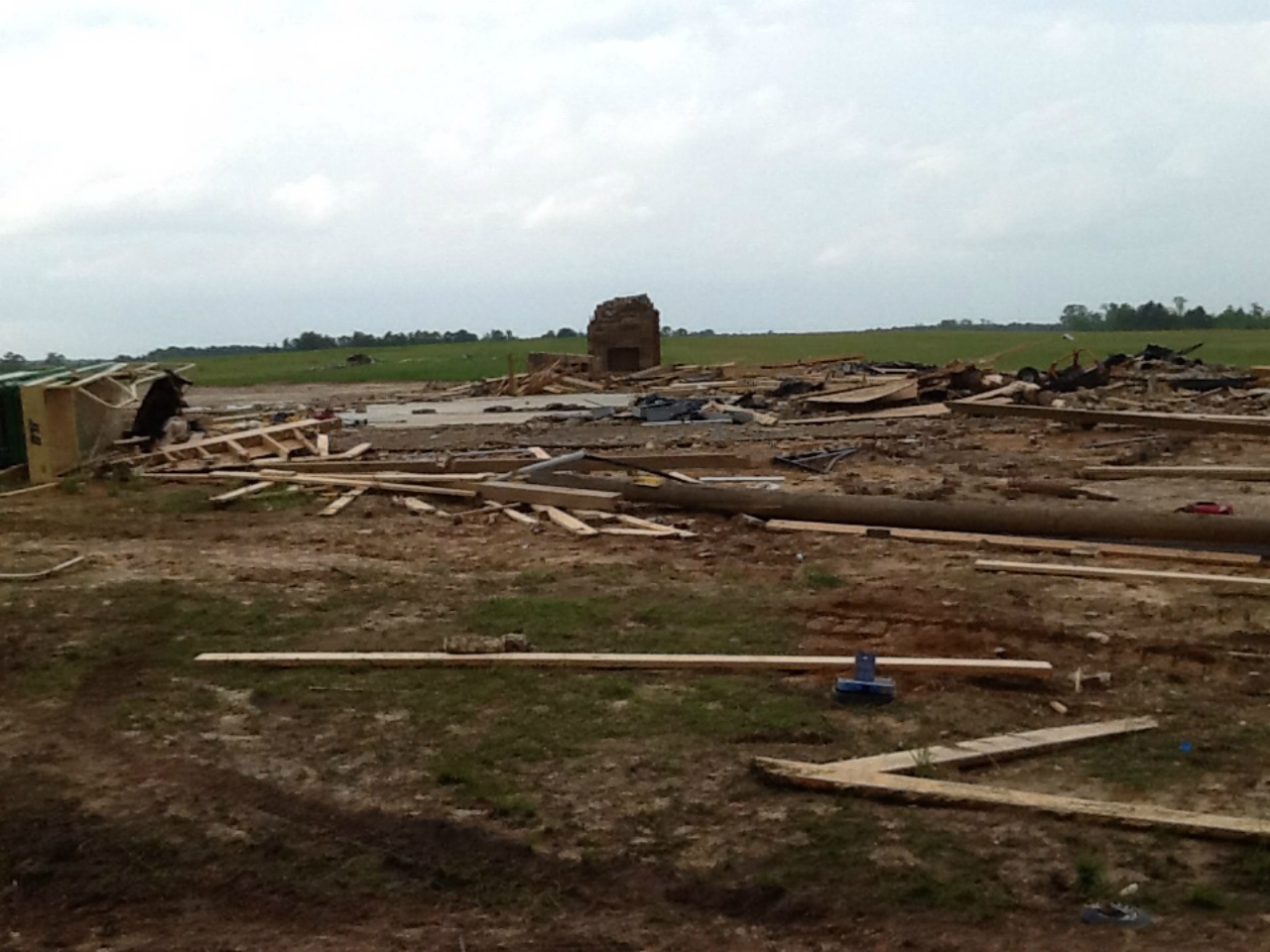
Louisville, MS

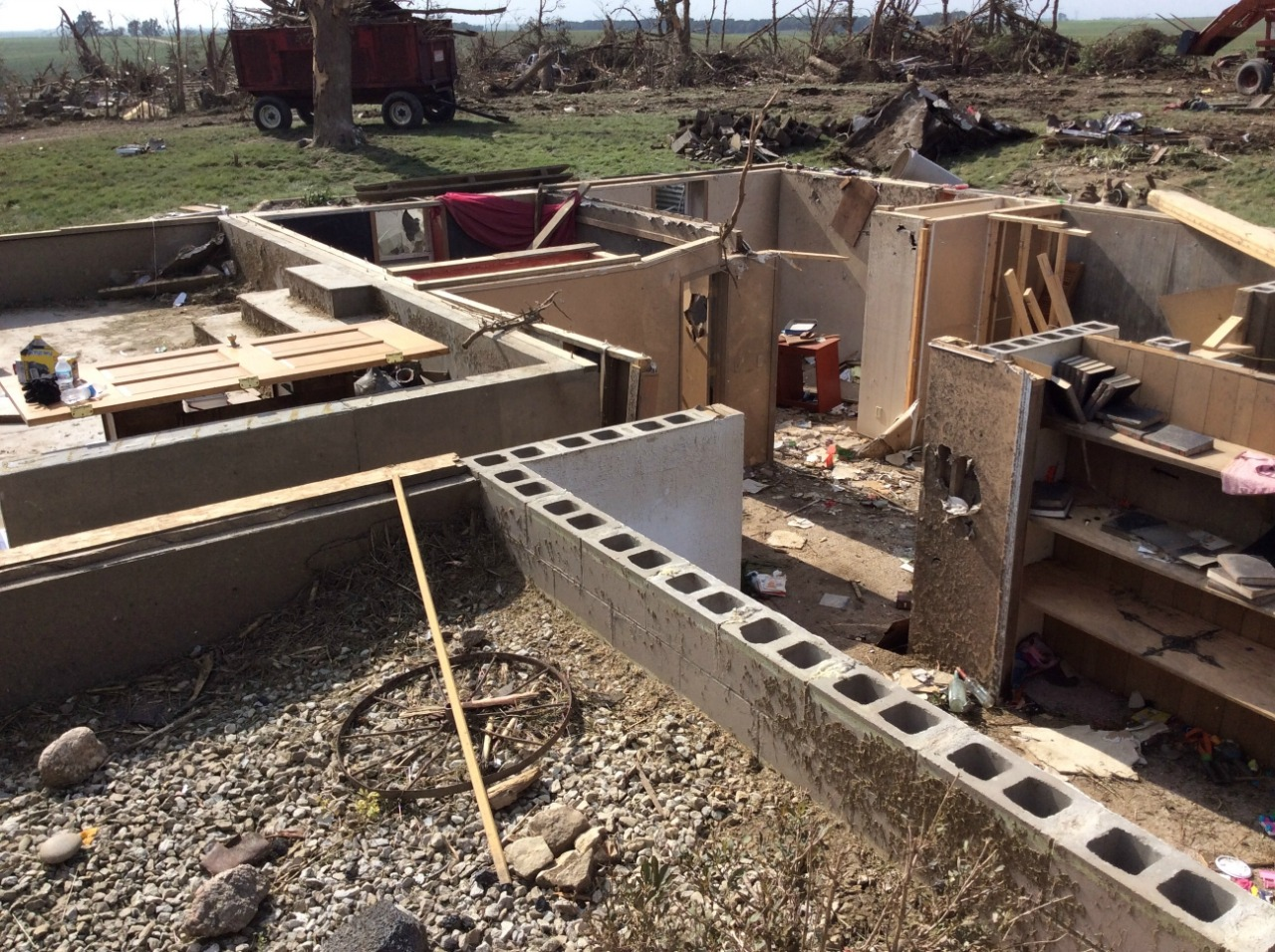
Pilger, NE

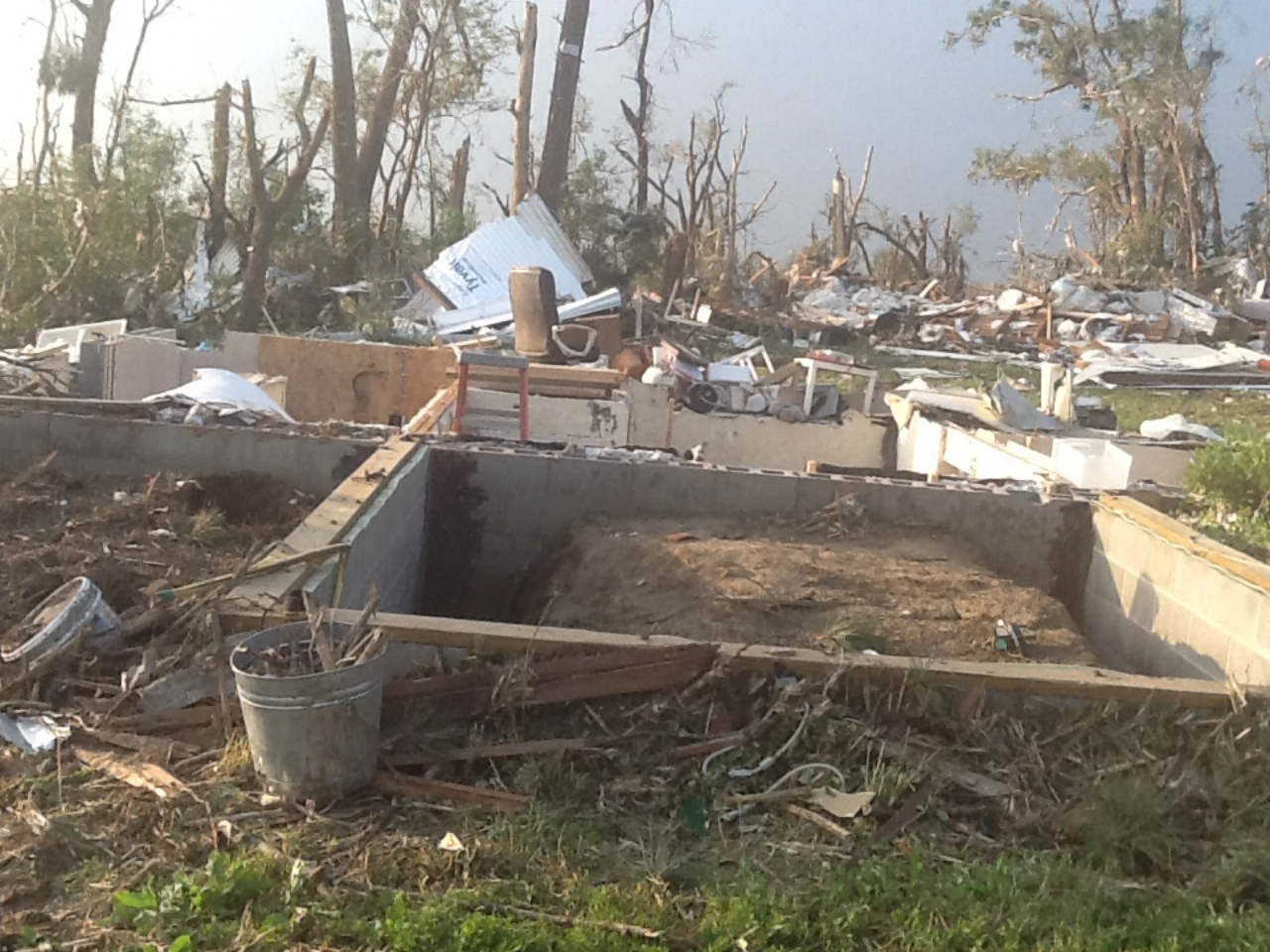
Wakefield, NE

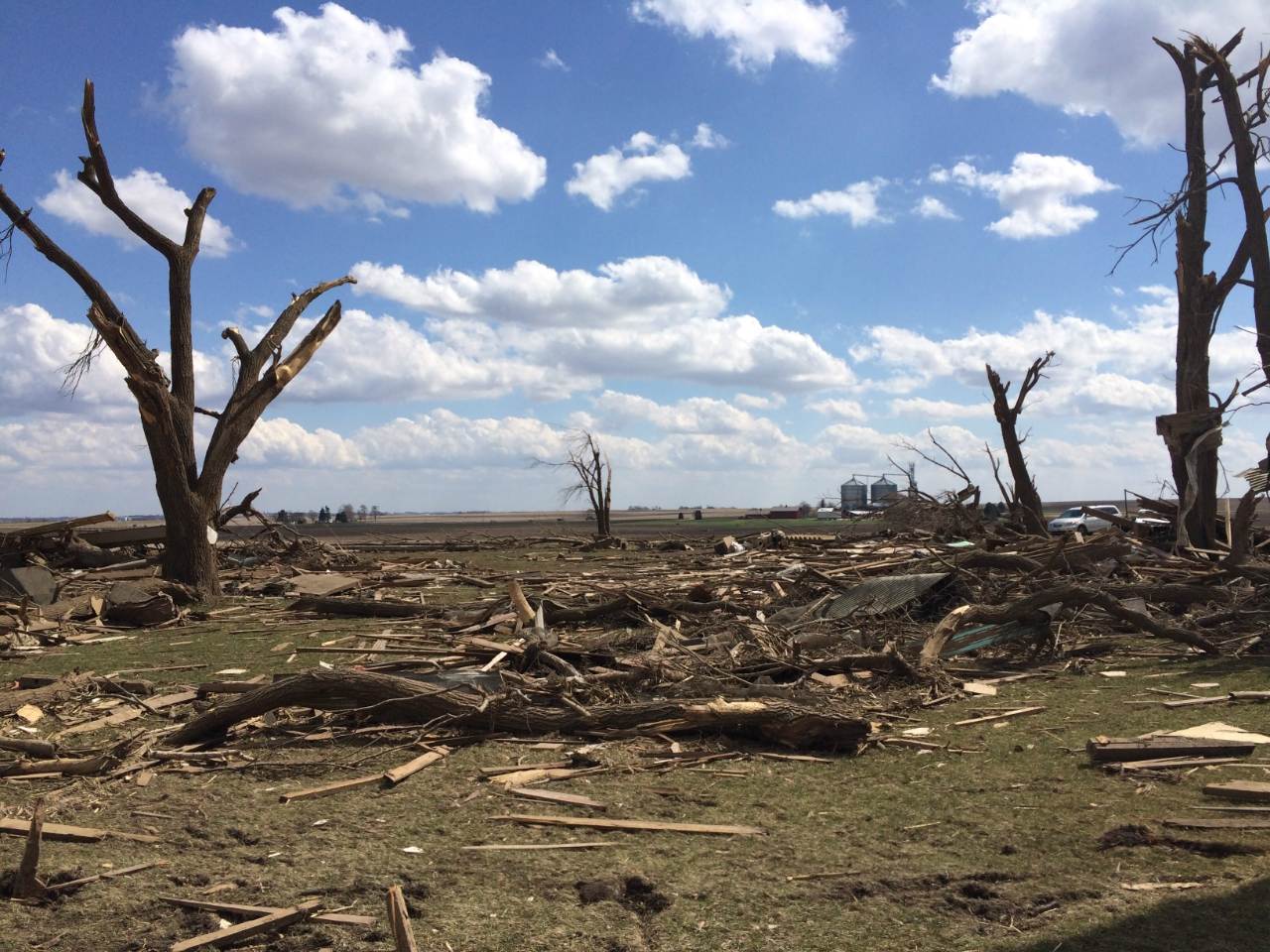
Rochelle, IL

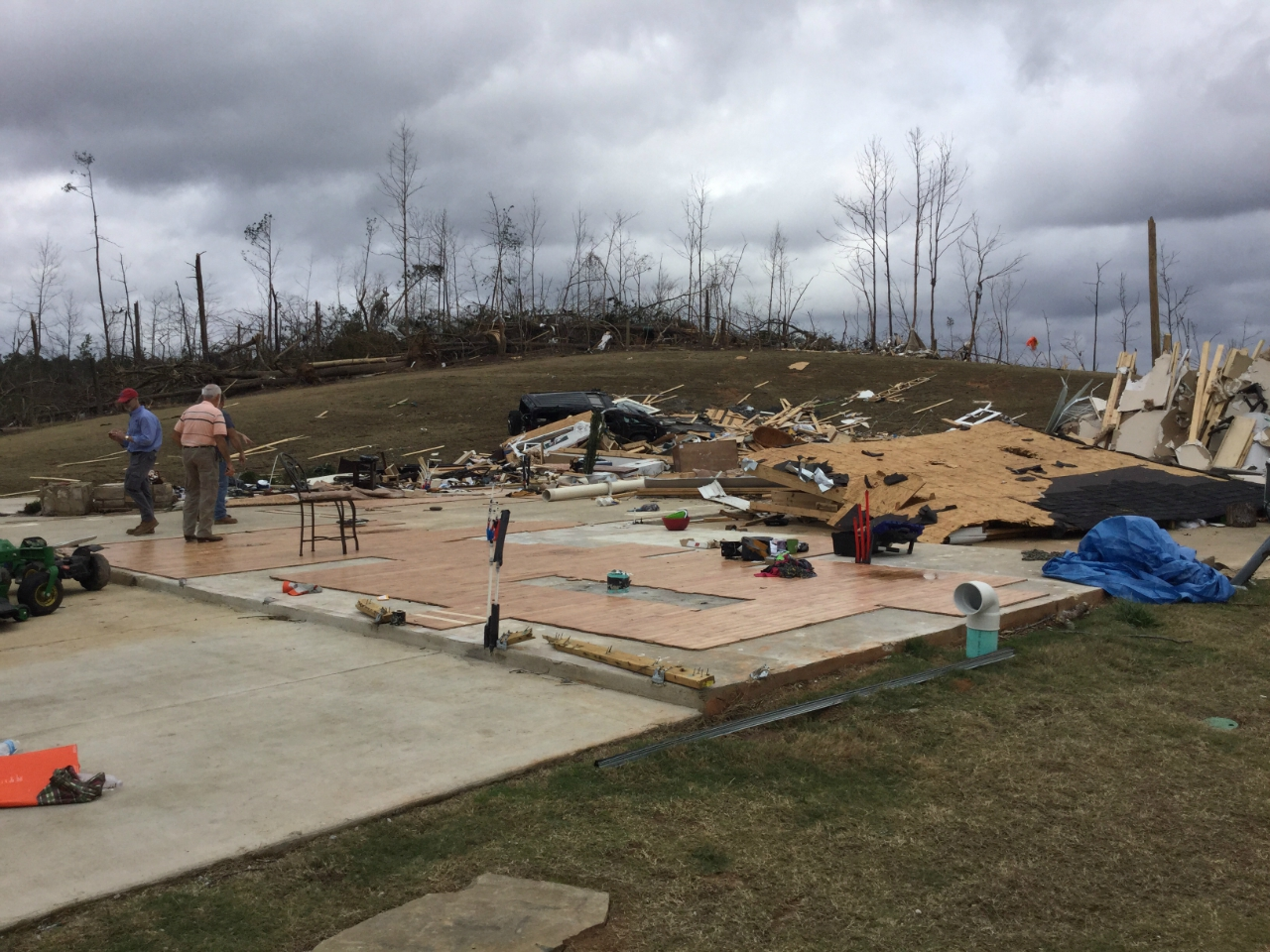
Canaan, MS

Rowlett, TX

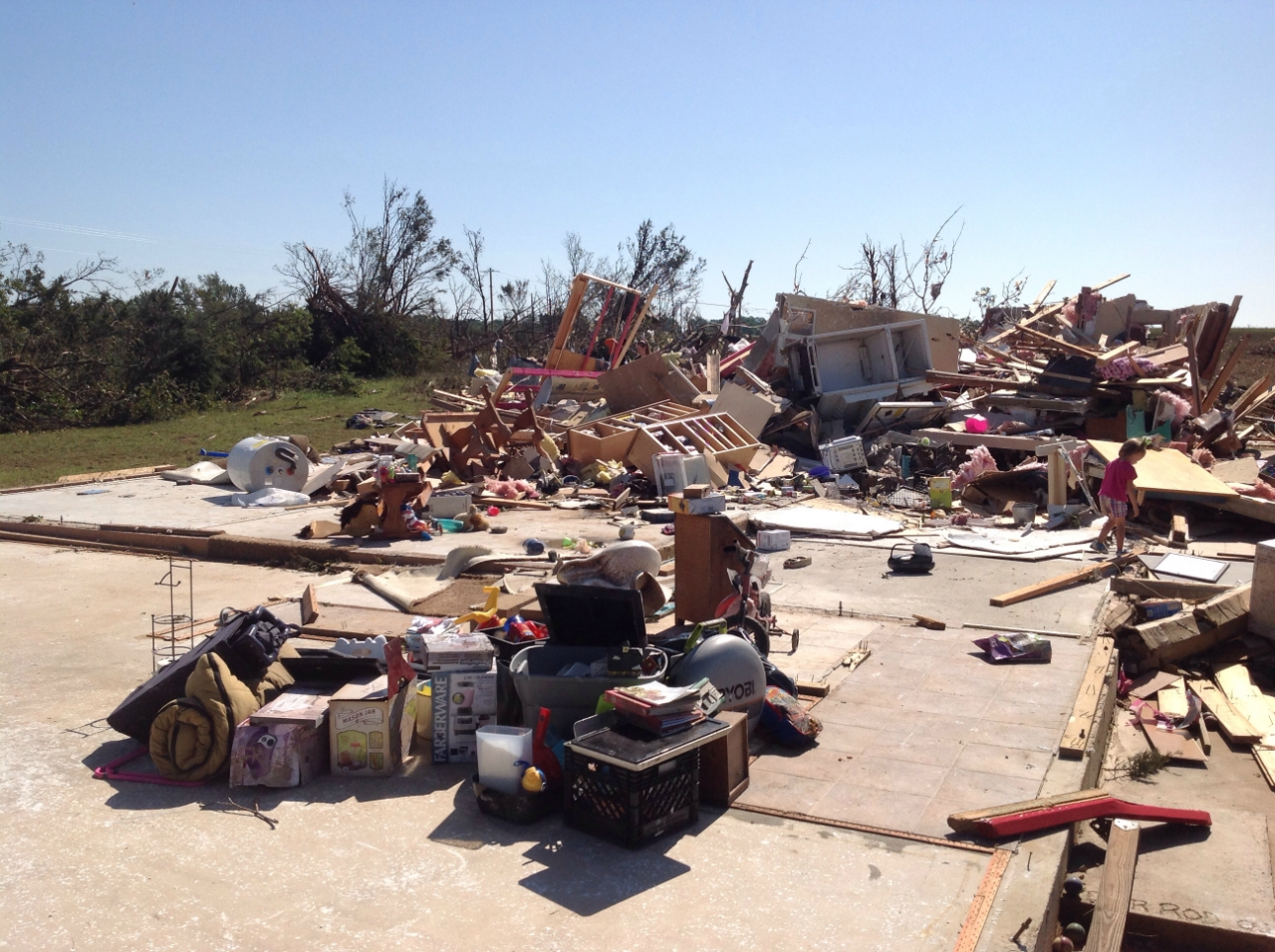
Katie, OK

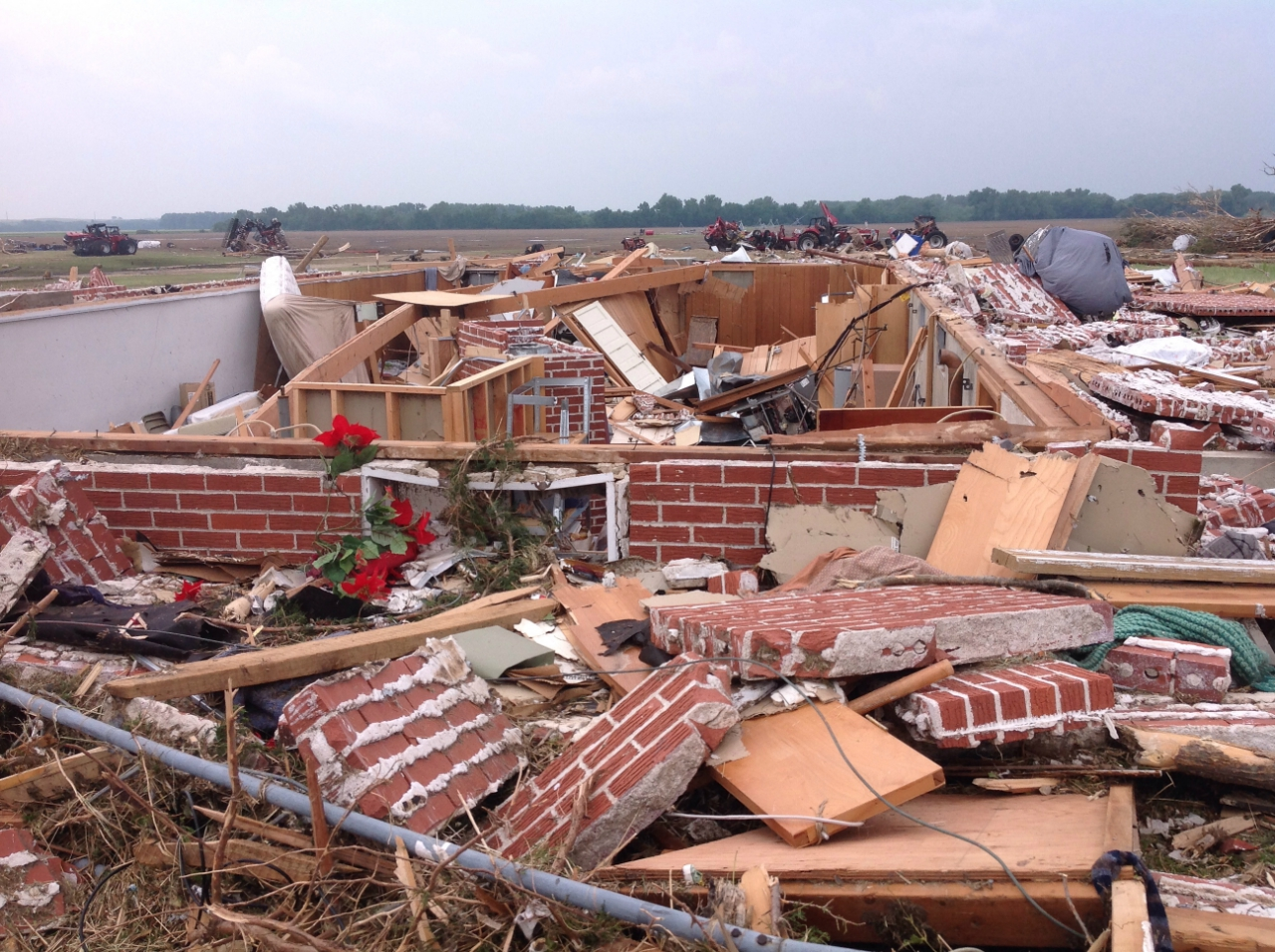
Chapman, KS

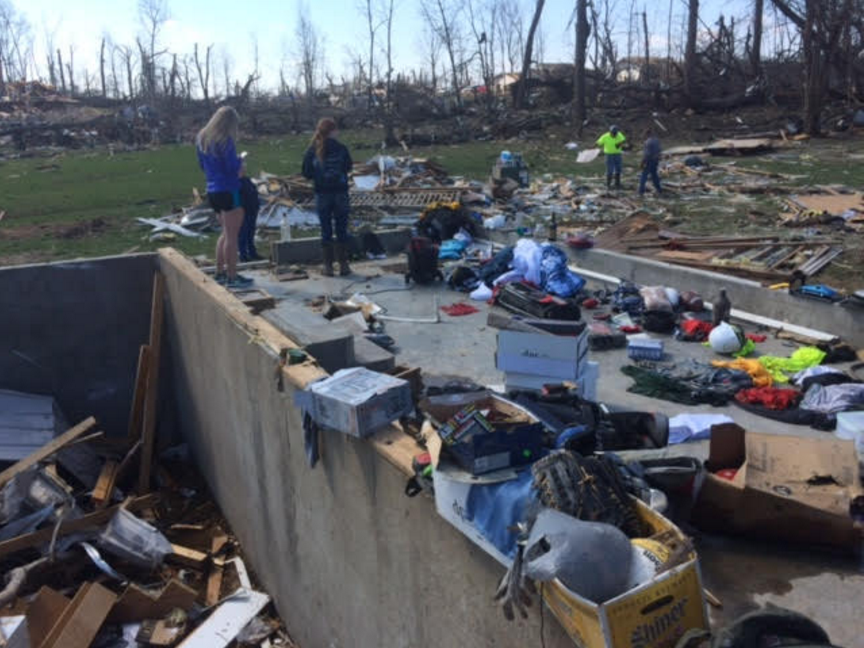
Perryville, MO

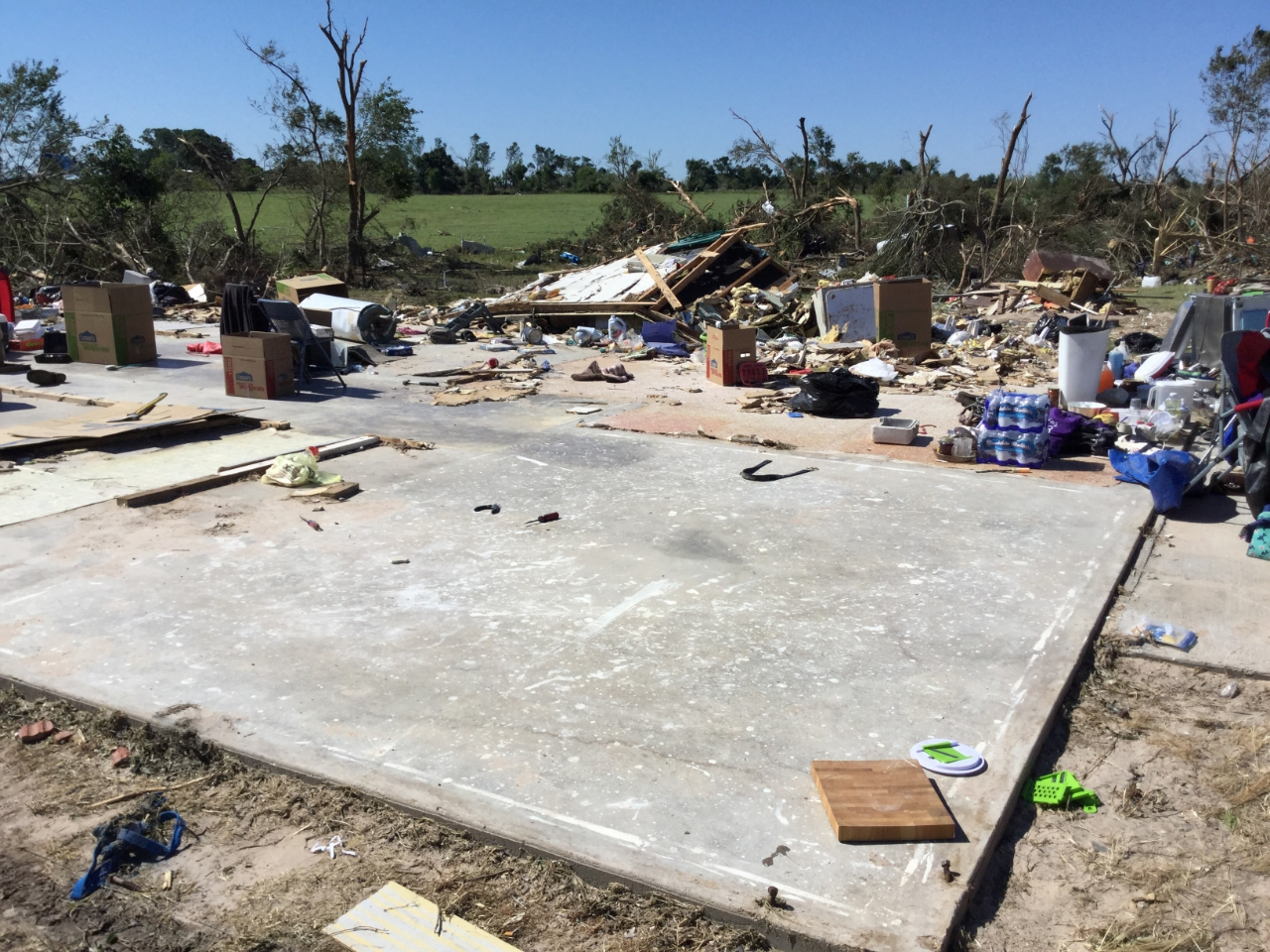
Canton, TX

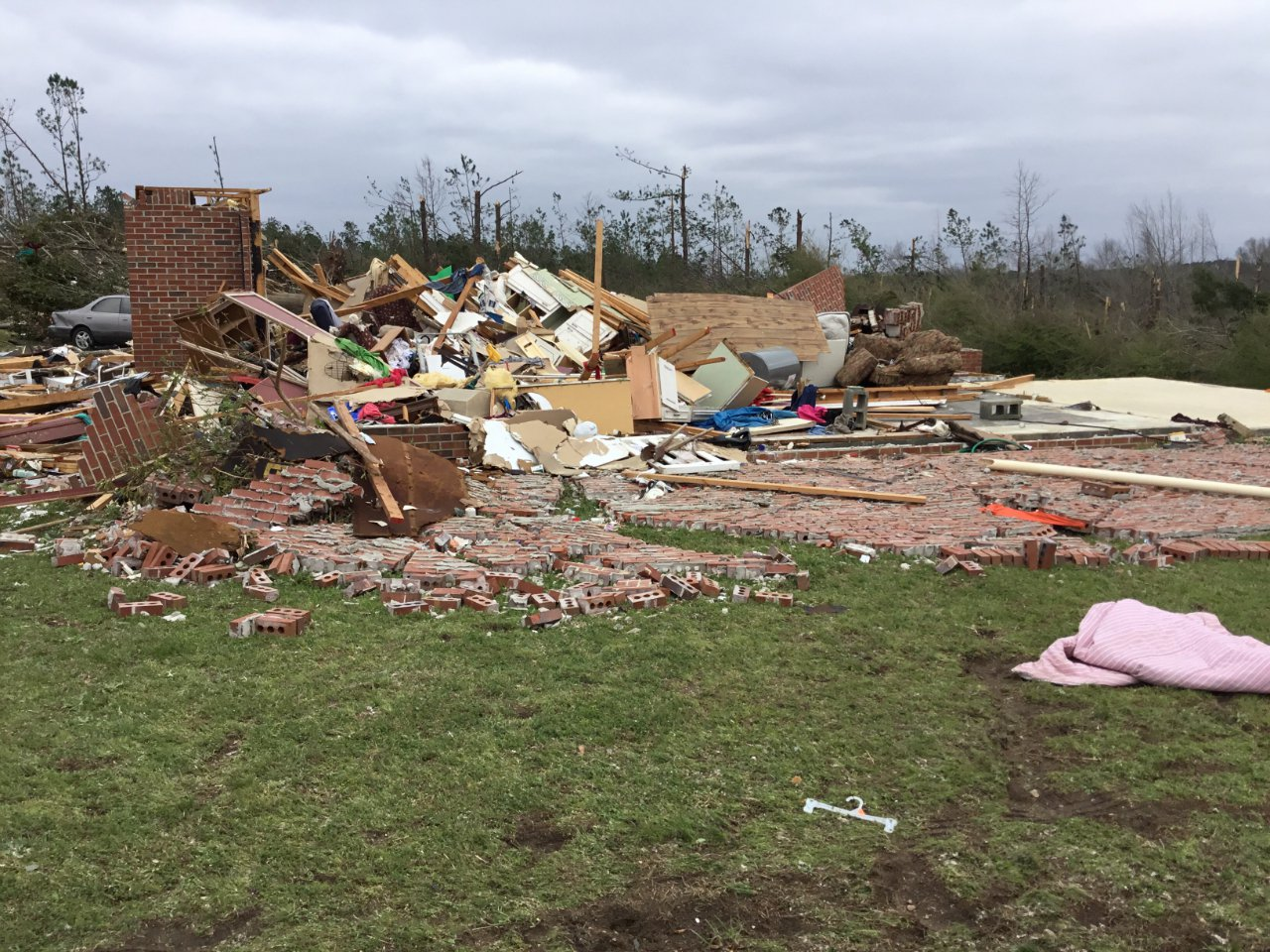
Beauregard, AL

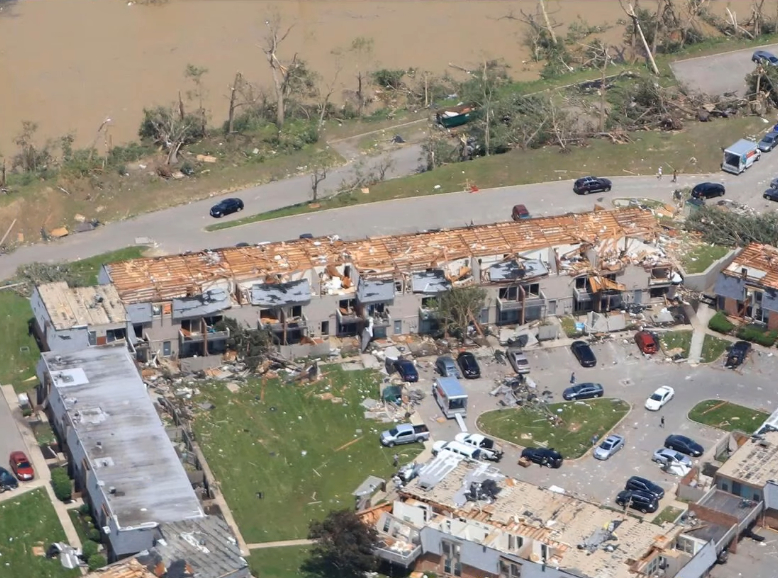
Dayton, OH

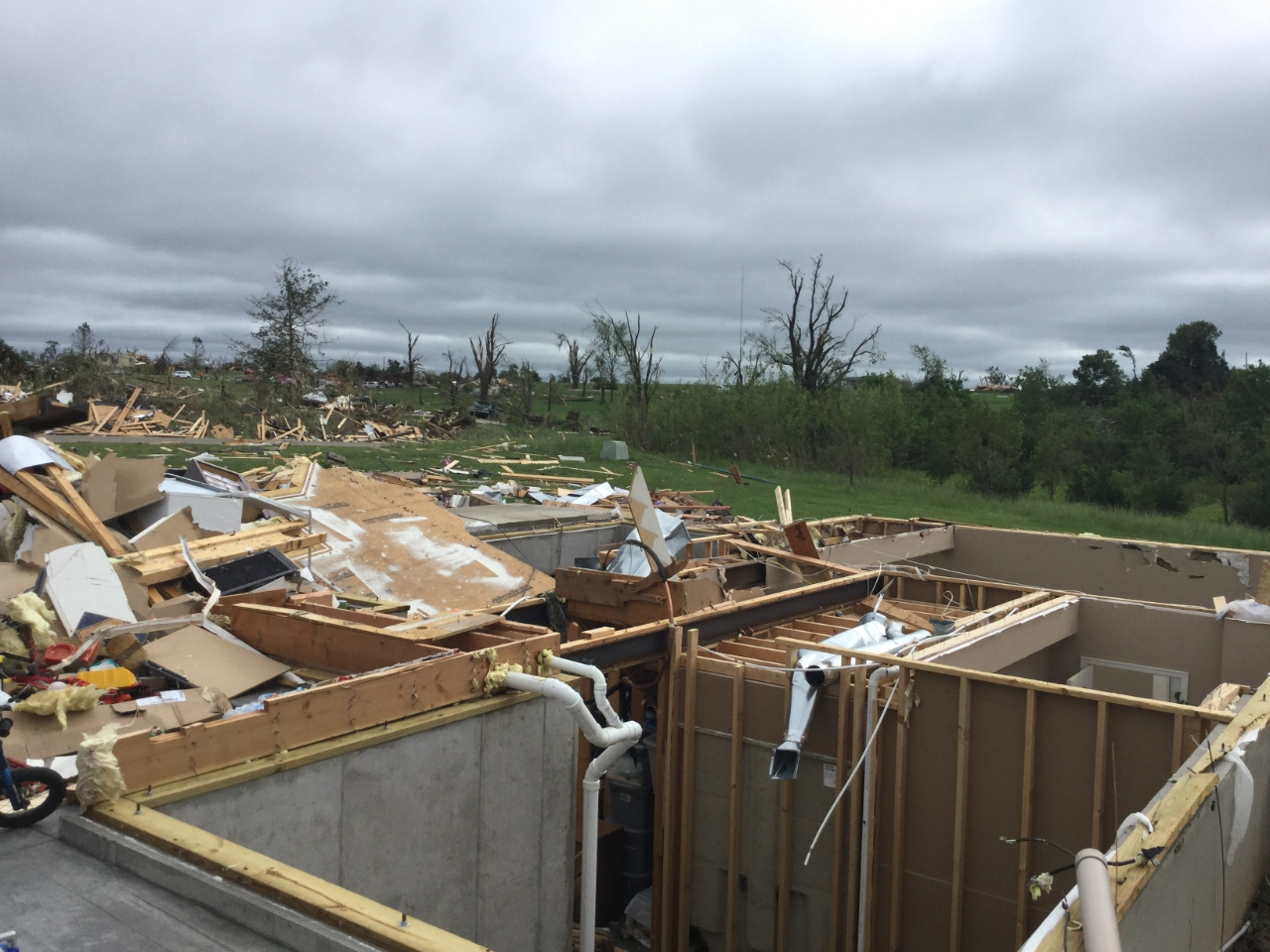
Linwood, KS

Tornadoes officially rated F4/EF4/IF4 or equivalent (2010–2019)
| Day | Year | Country | Subdivision | Location | Fatalities | Injuries | Rated by |
|---|---|---|---|---|---|---|---|
| April 24 | 2010 | United States | Louisiana, Mississippi | Tallulah (Louisiana), Yazoo City (Mississippi), Franklin, Durant, Weir | 10 | 146 | NWS |
2010 Yazoo City tornado — In Tallulah, the tornado caused near total destruction to a chemical plant. Later, the tornado moved through rural areas southwest of Yazoo City, causing major damage or total destruction of a number of homes, as well as intense tree damage. On the south side of Yazoo City, it reached its widest point at 1.75 miles (2.82 km) and maximum intensity. Several buildings, including a church and several businesses, were totally destroyed or even swept away, with little debris left in the lots. The tornado continued moving through residential areas on the southeast side of Yazoo City, heavily damaging or demolishing numerous homes. The tornado continued causing intense tree damage and damaging or destroying a number of rural residences for several more miles. Whole swaths of trees were mowed down, with intense debarking and denuding observed. As the tornado moved by the Franklin community, it again reached EF4 intensity as it completely destroyed two brick homes and heavily damaged or destroyed a number of other homes. EF4 damage occurred in Mississippi; the maximum damage in Louisiana was rated EF3.
| April 25 | 2010 | United States | Alabama | Collinsville | 0 | 5 | NWS |
2010 Crossville–Collinsville tornado — A two-story house and a church were flattened. Numerous other houses and manufactured homes were damaged or destroyed and trees were debarked. The tornado was initially rated EF3 but upgraded in later analysis.
| May 10 | 2010 | United States | Oklahoma | Moore, Choctaw, Harrah | 2 | 49 | NWS |
2010 Moore–Choctaw tornado — Numerous other houses were heavily damaged or destroyed, with a few flattened, as the tornado tracked across residential subdivisions near Choctaw and Harrah. The most severe damage was in the Deerfield West subdivision. Initially, the tornado was rated EF3. However, due to additional damage surveys finding houses flattened in subdivisions that were difficult to access due to damage, it was upgraded to EF4.
| May 10 | 2010 | United States | Oklahoma | Norman, Lake Thunderbird, Pink, Tecumseh | 1 | 32 | NWS |
2010 Norman–Lake Thunderbird tornado — The tornado hit Little Axe Public Schools, causing significant damage to the property, with concrete pillars and metal bleachers thrown considerable distances. Severe damage was reported in several subdivisions in and east of Little Axe, with numerous houses destroyed or completely flattened, and trees were stripped of their bark and branches. This tornado was also initially rated EF3. However, it was upgraded to EF4 in subsequent surveys after additional damage assessments found flattened houses on the eastern end of the track.
| May 22 | 2010 | United States | South Dakota | Bowdle, Walworth, Edmunds | 0 | 0 | NWS |
2010 Bowdle tornado — Near Bowdle, the tornado peaked at EF4 intensity. Many houses and outbuildings in the area suffered major damage. Trees were debarked and cars were thrown into the air. Transmission towers were toppled. One of them was torn off its concrete footings and was thrown hundreds of yards away.
| June 5 | 2010 | United States | Ohio | Wood, Ottawa | 7 | 28 | NWS |
2010 Millbury tornado — Severe damage in the area with at least 60 houses destroyed, including a few houses swept from their foundations, and several hundred others were damaged by the tornado. Cars and buses were picked up and thrown and trees were debarked. Large airplane hangars were completely destroyed, and a train was derailed.
| June 17 | 2010 | United States | Minnesota | Douglas, Otter Tail | 1 | 5 | NWS |
2010 Deer Creek tornado — Large multiple-vortex tornado flattened several houses and blew them away. Numerous other houses were damaged or destroyed. Farm buildings were also obliterated by the tornado, which was up to 1.3 miles (2.1 km) wide. Trees were also debarked and vehicles were thrown into the air.
| June 17 | 2010 | United States | North Dakota | Traill, Grand Forks | 0 | 1 | NWS |
2010 Mayville-Thompson tornado — This violent drillbit tornado swept a farmhouse off the foundation, with only an empty basement remaining. A welding building and several farm buildings were destroyed. Trees were snapped and debarked, one of which had a metal chair embedded into it while another had a computer hard drive pierced into the bark.
| June 17 | 2010 | United States | Minnesota | Otter Tail, Wadena | 0 | 20 | NWS |
2010 Wadena tornado — This was the second tornado from the Stevens County–Cass County supercell and within three minutes of forming, this multiple vortex tornado rapidly intensified, reaching EF4 intensity with winds estimated at 170 mph (270 km/h). The tornado struck the western side of Wadena, causing widespread severe damage. Two houses were blown away from their foundations and many other houses and businesses were destroyed. Headstones were toppled at a cemetery in Wadena.
| June 17 | 2010 | United States | Minnesota | Freeborn County, Albert Lea | 1 | 14 | NWS |
2010 Conger–Albert Lea tornado — Dozens of farms were affected and several houses were destroyed or leveled by this large wedge tornado. Some farmsteads were entirely destroyed by the tornado and numerous trees were debarked. A wind energy facility was damaged and vehicles were tossed. In light of the damage in the city, a tornado emergency was declared for Sebeka and Nimrod; however, substantial damage never took place in these areas.
| June 25 | 2010 | United States | Iowa | Sibley, Little Rock | 0 | 0 | NWS |
2010 Sibley tornado – One house was flattened and several others were severely damaged. Numerous farm buildings were destroyed or flattened and cars were picked up and thrown. Corn was scoured, power poles were knocked down and trees were debarked.
| August 7 | 2010 | United States | North Dakota, Minnesota | Tyler, Doran | 0 | 0 | NWS |
2010 Tyler−Doran tornado – At least 14 farm buildings were obliterated, with others damaged. One barn was completely swept away, with pieces of stone torn from the foundation and thrown into nearby fields. A sugarbeet field was heavily scoured with beets pulled from the ground, and grass scouring was noted elsewhere. A pickup truck was also thrown over1/2 mile (800 m) away and destroyed, with the engine block ripped out and thrown an additional 2/3 of a mile. Tree debarking occurred, and a farmhouse was heavily damaged as well. EF4 damage occurred in Minnesota; the maximum damage in North Dakota was rated EF3.
| November 29 | 2010 | United States | Louisiana | Atlanta | 0 | 0 | NWS |
2010 Atlanta tornado – Two large brick houses were completely destroyed in a rural area and a mobile home was also destroyed. Several other houses were damaged and many trees were damaged.
| April 9 | 2011 | United States | Iowa | Pocahontas | 0 | 0 | NWS |
2011 Pocahontas tornado — An intense satellite tornado that occurred on the west flank of a large EF3 wedge tornado. One farmhouse was flattened and swept off its foundation by this tornado. A combine, estimated at 30,000 pounds (14,000 kg), sitting in a machine shed was tossed roughly 100 yards (91 m), and many trees were debarked.
| April 22 | 2011 | United States | Missouri, Illinois | St. Louis County, City of St. Louis, Madison County | 0 | 5 | NWS |
2011 St. Louis tornado — The tornado reached EF4 intensity in Bridgeton where a number of houses were completely destroyed. Afterwards the tornado traveled parallel to I-70 and struck Lambert–St. Louis International Airport at EF2 intensity, blowing out numerous windows and peeling away a large section of roof. EF4 damage occurred in Missouri; the maximum damage in Illinois was rated EF2.
| April 27 | 2011 | United States | Alabama | Cullman, Fairview, Hulaco, Ruth, Arab, Union Grove | 6 | 48+ | NWS |
2011 Cullman–Arab tornado — The tornado became large wedge-shaped and had highly visible multiple vortices as it attained EF4 intensity just north of Fairview, completely destroying homes and debarking numerous hardwood trees. Pieces of debris were found speared through vehicles in this area. The tornado then briefly passed near the town of Hulaco, destroying several older block-foundation homes and snapping numerous large trees off at the base. The tornado then crossed into Marshall County and impacted the rural community of Ruth, just north of Arab. A large but poorly anchored brick home was swept completely away in this area, with the debris scattered 100 yards from the foundation. Several large trees on the property were ripped out of the ground and missing, along with a trailer that was unable to be located at the time of the survey. Other homes and structures were impacted in the Ruth area, and a gas station was completely destroyed. This tornado, as well as the next several listed below (same date), was part of the most violent tornado outbreak since the 1974 Super Outbreak, with the second most EF5's (behind 1974) and third most total number of violent (EF4+; behind 1974 and Palm Sunday 1965) ever recorded on a single day.
| April 27 | 2011 | United States | Alabama | Reform, Oakman, Cordova, Arkadelphia, Blountsville | 13 | 54+ | NWS |
2011 Cordova–Blountsville tornado — Past Cordova, the tornado intensified into a violent EF4 tornado as it completely leveled a site-built home and obliterated two nearby mobile homes. One of the mobile home undercarriages was tossed at least 500 yards (460 m). A 5-ton bulldozer was flipped over, a pickup truck was tossed 200 yards (180 m), and a dump truck was tossed 50 yards (46 m) and destroyed. A two-ton trailer was thrown 1 mile (1.6 km) and left a 2.5-foot (0.76 m) deep crater where it impacted the ground. Two double-wide mobile homes were tossed at least 100 yards (91 m), and a third mobile home was tossed 100 yards (91 m) up a 50-foot (15 m) embankment and destroyed along this segment of the path as well. South of Arkadelphia, a second area of EF4 damage was observed, as a cinder block construction home was leveled and a car was thrown 130 yards (120 m). Nearby, an underground storm shelter collapsed onto the occupants sheltering inside as the tornado passed overhead.
| April 27 | 2011 | United States | Alabama, Georgia | Pisgah, Rosalie, Flat Rock, Higdon (Alabama), Trenton (Georgia) | 14 | 50+ | NWS |
2011 Flat Rock–Trenton tornado — The tornado rapidly intensified to low-end EF4 strength after touching down as it passed northwest of Pisgah and Rosalie, destroying numerous mobile homes and block foundation homes, scattering the debris hundreds of yards and killing three people. Thousands of trees were snapped and debarked and vehicles were thrown up to 50 yards (46 m) in different directions. As it passed near Flat Rock and Higdon, the tornado reached high-end EF4 strength, mowing down thousands of trees in this rural area. As the tornado struck a farm, a home and two chicken houses were completely obliterated and swept away. A heavy propane tank was lofted and thrown 100 yards (91 m) from one of the chicken houses, and 19 cattle on the property were killed. The tornado maintained EF4 strength as it tore through the rural community of Shiloh, sweeping away numerous mobile homes and block foundation homes. EF4 damage occurred in Alabama; the maximum damage in Georgia was rated EF3.
| April 27 | 2011 | United States | Alabama | Tuscaloosa, Birmingham | 64 | 1,500+ | NWS |
2011 Tuscaloosa–Birmingham tornado — A violent, high-end EF4 multiple-vortex tornado that destroyed portions of Tuscaloosa and Birmingham, Alabama. The tornado entered the southern portion of Tuscaloosa as a low-end EF4, completely destroying a cell phone tower and several warehouses in an industrial area. It passed within a half-mile of the Tuscaloosa Police Department Headquarters, forcing the evacuation of the dispatch personnel from the third floor offices until the storm passed. At that same time, the Tuscaloosa County Emergency Management Office sustained a direct hit and was totally destroyed along with most of their equipment and vehicles but with no injuries to the staff present. The tornado then ripped through the neighborhoods of Rosedale and Forest Lake, leveling and sweeping away numerous poorly anchored homes. Several apartment complexes were entirely destroyed in this area, and a few two-story apartment buildings were completely reduced to rubble. Numerous businesses and restaurants near the University Mall were completely flattened at low-end EF4 strength, and vehicles were either tossed around or destroyed. The nearby Cedar Crest subdivision was devastated as numerous block-foundation homes were leveled. The tornado maintained its strength as it continued through the neighborhood of Alberta City, leveling and sweeping away numerous block-foundation homes, and completely flattening two more apartment buildings and a shopping center. As the tornado exited the Alberta City section, the Chastain Manor Apartments (which were nailed, rather than bolted to their foundations) were completely destroyed and partially swept away. A well-anchored clubhouse on the property was mostly swept away and its remains were scattered into a pond, even though the structure had lacked interior walls. The tornado then grew from 0.5 miles (0.80 km) to 1 mile (1.6 km) wide and ripped through the suburb of Holt, leveling and sweeping away homes while still at low-end EF4 strength. Every tree was snapped in this area, including those within deep ravines. The tornado tore apart a large metal railroad trestle, and a 34-tonne (74,957 lb) metal truss support structure was thrown 100 ft (30 m) up on a nearby hill. Near Birmingham, the tornado intensified into a high-end EF4 causing catastrophic damage as numerous trees were debarked, and some homes were swept away. As the tornado moved across a coal yard in this area, a 35.8-tonne (78,925 lb) coal car was thrown 391 ft (119 m) through the air. The final rating of this tornado was a source of controversy, as some survey teams concluded EF5 damage, while others did not. The structures that were swept away by this tornado were either improperly anchored, lacked interior walls, or were surrounded by contextual damage not consistent with winds exceeding 200 mph (320 km/h), and as a result an EF5 rating could not be applied. Therefore, it was given a final rating of high-end EF4, with winds estimated at 190 mph (310 km/h). It caused approximately $2.4 billion of property damage, surpassing the 1999 Bridge Creek–Moore tornado as the costliest single tornado in United States history at that time. Less than a month later, however, this number was surpassed by the Joplin, Missouri EF5 tornado, which caused $2.8 billion in damage.
| April 27 | 2011 | United States | Alabama, Tennessee | Fackler, Stevenson, Bridgeport (Alabama), Haletown (Tennessee) | 1 | 0 | NWS |
2011 Bridgeport tornado — Between Stevenson and Bridgeport, the tornado reached EF4 strength, with the most significant damage being a home reduced to its foundation. A concrete slab at the front of the home was pulled up and a set of concrete stairs was ripped from the foundation. A compact car was thrown about 50 yards (46 m) as well. Continuing, the tornado reduced two more well-built and well-anchored homes to their block foundations and threw another car approximately 50 yards (46 m). Several large trees were snapped off just above the ground, a third home was left with no walls standing, and a mobile home was completely demolished. EF4 damage occurred in Alabama; the maximum damage in Tennessee was rated low-end EF2.
| April 27 | 2011 | United States | Mississippi, Alabama | Raleigh, Louin, Rose Hill, Enterprise (Mississippi), Yantley (Alabama), Uniontown | 7 | 17 | NWS |
2011 Enterprise Tornado — The first area of EF4 damage was observed near Louin as a frame home and several mobile homes were completely destroyed, with parts of the mobile homes being thrown long distances, and some of the frame home foundation being swept clean. Another area of EF4 damage was observed east of Enterprise as a new home undergoing completion was leveled, with the debris swept off the foundation. Many more frame homes were heavily damaged nearby. This tornado was on the ground for nearly three hours, having traveled 122.04 miles (196.40 km) across seven counties in two states. EF4 damage occurred in Mississippi; the maximum damage in Alabama was rated EF3.
| April 27 | 2011 | United States | Alabama, Georgia | Shoal Creek Valley, Neely Henry Lake, Ohatchee, Wellington, Piedmont (Alabama), Cave Spring (Georgia) | 22 | 85 | NWS |
2011 Shoal Creek Valley–Ohatchee tornado — Around Neely Henry Lake, homes were destroyed in this area, one was swept away, and thousands of trees were mowed down and debarked, indicating EF4 intensity. The tornado maintained EF4 strength, moving at 50–60 mph (80–97 km/h) as it crossed the lake and tore across the north edge of Ohatchee, completely leveling or sweeping away numerous waterfront homes, with only brick steps, a fireplace and chimney, or a slab left behind. Around Wellington, a small pocket of EF4 damage occurred in the small rural community of Webster's Chapel, where a church and several homes were completely leveled or swept away, trees were reduced to stumps, and many other homes were left with only interior walls standing. The tornado travelled 97.33 miles (156.64 km) over the span of an hour and 47 minutes. EF4 damage occurred in Alabama; max damage in Georgia was rated EF3.
| April 27 | 2011 | United States | Tennessee | Chilhowee Dam, Cherokee National Forest, Great Smoky Mountains National Park | 0 | 0 | NWS |
2011 Chilhowee Lake tornado — A wedge tornado that ripped a large metal TVA transmission tower from its concrete footings. Thousands of large trees were mowed down and debarked along a near mile-wide path.
| April 27 | 2011 | United States | Georgia, Tennessee | Ringgold (Georgia), Apison (Tennessee), Cleveland | 20 | 335 | NWS |
2011 Ringgold–Apison tornado — A violent multiple-vortex tornado struck portions of extreme northern Georgia and southeast Tennessee. In Ringgold, the tornado reached EF4 intensity as it tore through a subdivision at the north edge of town. Twelve homes were completely obliterated and swept away at that location (though they were not well-built). Several trees were denuded and debarked in this area as well. Soon, the tornado intensified and caused high-end EF4 damage to Apison, where large homes were leveled or swept away, 150 others were damaged, and thousands of trees were snapped and uprooted. Weakening slightly, the low-end EF4 tornado moved near Cleveland and affecting mainly residential areas, though a few businesses were damaged or destroyed as well. Subdivisions in the southern part of the city sustained major damage, with numerous houses destroyed and a few that were leveled. EF4 damage occurred in both states.
| April 27 | 2011 | United States | Tennessee | Walden Ridge, New Harmony, Spring City | 4 | 12 | NWS |
2011 New Harmony tornado — Well-built homes were completely leveled, mobile homes were destroyed, farm machinery and vehicles were thrown and mangled, and numerous trees were snapped and debarked, indicating high-end EF4 intensity estimated at 190 miles per hour (310 km/h). Many barns and outbuildings were destroyed as well.
| April 27 | 2011 | United States | Alabama | Central, Eclectic, Lake Martin, Dadeville | 7 | 30 | NWS |
2011 Lake Martin tornado — Several well-built, multi-story homes were destroyed with many having no walls remaining above the basement level, indicating EF4 intensity. Near Dadeville, significant damage to numerous homes and businesses occurred.
| May 24 | 2011 | United States | Oklahoma | Chickasha, Blanchard, Newcastle | 1 | 48 | NWS |
2011 Chickasha–Blanchard tornado — A narrow cone-shaped tornado that eventually became a wedge as it caused EF4 damage. In the first area of EF4 intensity, the ground was scoured to the bare soil, trees were debarked, and several homes were leveled, one of which was reduced to a bare slab (though this home was nailed rather than bolted to its foundation). Several vehicles were thrown hundreds of yards nearby, including an SUV that was carried 300 yards and crumpled into a ball. The tornado maintained EF4 strength, reducing two well-built homes to rubble and destroying two nearby metal buildings. Many trees were debarked in this area, and a mixture of scoured crops, mud, and straw was found piled up to a depth of 6 feet against a nearby fence line. A third home sustained collapse of its exterior walls. Further along the path, another well-built home was flattened at EF4 strength, a metal building was destroyed, and vehicles were thrown up to 300 yards away. The tornado the tore across a series of open fields further to the northeast, leaving behind a continuous swath of debarked trees and scoured grass. An oil pump jack was also destroyed in this area as well. After briefly weakening, the tornado reintensified to high-end EF3 to EF4 strength as it completely debarked numerous trees and obliterated several metal buildings, outbuildings, and mobile homes. Several vehicles parked near a residence along N2980 Road were thrown up to 400 yards away, some of which were wrapped around trees or stripped down to their frames, and severe ground scouring occurred in this area. Numerous homes were heavily damaged or destroyed in a nearby semi-rural subdivision, one of which was leveled at EF4 intensity. Near Blanchard, NWS damage surveyors said, the tornado "shrunk and tightened to plausibly EF5 strength" as it approached and crossed Kitty Hawk Road, scouring away a large area of pavement. Sections of asphalt were gouged out by high-velocity debris impacts further along the road, and nearby trees were reduced to completely debarked stumps. As the now narrow, but very intense tornado ripped through the front lawn of a nearby house, all grass and several inches of topsoil was scoured away in a narrow swath. Several homes were reduced to bare slabs in this area, and vehicles were thrown up to 600 yards away, including a pickup truck that was torn into multiple pieces. Due to intensity of the damage in this area, surveyors noted that the tornado was "plausibly EF5" as it clipped the north side of Blanchard, though the fact that the homes swept away were missing some of their anchor bolt washers led to a high-end EF4 rating being assigned instead.
| May 24 | 2011 | United States | Oklahoma | Bradley, Washington, Goldsby | 0 | 61 | NWS |
2011 Washington-Goldsby tornado — The tornado reached EF4 strength as it crossed SH-76, leveling and sweeping away several well-built homes. Vehicles were thrown long distances and mangled almost beyond recognition nearby. An extensive swath of ground scouring began at this time as well. After briefly weakening, the tornado re-intensified to EF4 strength as numerous well-built homes were leveled and some were swept completely away. Unusual cycloidal debris impact scars were noted in open fields as well. One well-built home in this area with numerous anchor bolts was reduced to a bare slab, though a metal fence immediately next to the house remained standing and grass on the property was not scoured. Another home that was reduced to a bare slab in this area had anchor bolts spaced every two feet (well above the standard of anchoring required for an EF5 rating), though a closer inspection of the home site revealed that a large mobile home frame had smashed into the house during the tornado, and a Jacuzzi found in the rubble behind the house was still in usable condition. Due to these contextual discrepancies, damage in this area was rated high-end EF4 rather than EF5. After briefly weakening once again a final area of EF4 damage occurred as a large, well-built home was completely swept away with only the slab remaining, and large metal storage tanks behind the house were tossed. This home was specifically engineered to be tornado resistant, though close inspection of the foundation revealed that some of the anchor bolt washers were missing, and the ones that were present were slightly too small, preventing a rating higher than EF4.
| May 25 | 2011 | United States | Arkansas | Etna, Denning, Centerpoint, Bethlehem, Harmony, Ozark–St. Francis National Forest | 4 | 27 | NWS |
2011 Etna-Centerpoint tornado — A large, wedge tornado that damaged or destroyed several small communities. In Etna, numerous frame homes, mobile homes, and a metal building were completely destroyed, and some of the homes were well-built, but were left with only a small amount of debris on their foundations, indicating low-end EF4 damage. Past Etna, the tornado destroyed a very well-built steel-frame home, leaving only interior walls standing. The structure was not entirely flattened, though a low-end EF4 rating was applied due to how well-constructed the house was. While weakening to EF2 strength, the tornado reached its maximum width of 1 1/4 miles (2.0 km).
| October 2 | 2011 | South Africa | Gauteng | Duduza | 1 | 100+ | Zac Muller |
Tornadoes of 2011#October 2–3 (South Africa) – The town of Duduza was devastated with brick homes completely destroyed.
| November 7 | 2011 | United States | Texas, Oklahoma | Wilbarger County (Texas), Jackson County (Oklahoma), Tillman County | 0 | 0 | NWS |
2011 Tipton tornado – An Oklahoma Mesonet station measured a peak wind gust of 86.4 miles per hour (139.0 km/h) before being destroyed by flying debris. Rated EF4 based on damage to an Oklahoma State University research station. This was the first F4 or EF4 tornado in Oklahoma during the month of November since official records began in 1950. EF4 damage occurred in Oklahoma; no known damage occurred in Texas, where it was rated EF0.
| February 29 | 2012 | United States | Illinois | Harrisburg, Ridgway | 8 | 108 | NWS |
2012 Harrisburg-Ridgway tornado — A violent tornado spawned by a semi-discrete supercell thunderstorm embedded within a larger squall line of storms that damaged or destroyed numerous structures. In Harrisburg, businesses were completely leveled with only piles of rubble left behind. Several other businesses were damaged, and the large Christ Lutheran Church was flattened with debris wind-rowed long distances through a nearby field. A paper check from the church was later found in the yard of a residence 45 miles away. Continuing at EF4 strength, the tornado proceeded to level a large strip mall, with large amounts of debris strewn into a nearby retention pond. Numerous homes in this area were badly damaged or destroyed, several of which were leveled or swept from their foundations and small, one-story apartment buildings were swept away. Vehicles were tossed and destroyed, many trees and power lines were downed, and metal fence posts were also bent to the ground in this area.
| March 2 | 2012 | United States | Indiana, Kentucky | Fredericksburg, New Pekin, Henryville, Marysville, Chelsea (Indiana), Bedford (Kentucky) | 11+ | Unknown | NWS |
2012 Henryville tornado — A stovepipe tornado that carved a 49 mi (79 km) path of damage through Indiana and Kentucky, destroying hundreds of homes. Soon after touching down, the tornado 6 in (15 cm) thick slabs of asphalt off the roadway and tossed them 10 to 30 yd (9.1 to 27.4 m). Smaller pieces of pavement were found up to a quarter-mile away. Just beyond this point, the tornado path began to widen and tremendous tree damage was observed. The tornado then impacted a large factory building, which was leveled to its foundation with large amounts of debris swept away. Anchor bolts were bent at this location, and debris from the factory was scattered up to 0.75 mi (1.21 km) downwind, indicating low-end EF4 damage. The tornado continued to produce high-end EF3 to EF4 strength damage to many homes and farmsteads as it traversed rural areas. One brick home at the top of a ridge was completely leveled, and a heavy trailer cab from this location was found a quarter-mile away at the remains of another destroyed brick home. Several cows missing from this vicinity were never located, and thousands of trees were mowed down along a swath up to a half-mile wide. The tornado maintained EF4 strength as it crossed into Clark County, completely leveling several well-built homes shortly after crossing the county line. After briefly weakening, the tornado restrengthened to EF4 intensity as it crossed Interstate 65 as multiple vehicles were tossed and semi-trucks were flipped. Just past the interstate, the Henryville school complex was in the process of dismissing as the tornado approached the community, and sustained low-end EF4 structural damage including total destruction of its cafeteria. Low-level winds in this area were so intense that debris was found wedged underneath plastic reflective strips in the parking lot. Damage surveyors found evidence of very intense multiple vortices as the tornado entered the community. Massive deforestation occurred in heavily wooded areas around town, and debris from Henryville was found as far east as Ohio. The tornado then weakened, but later regained EF4 intensity when the complete destruction of a frame home occurred and several well-built homes were leveled with some completely swept clean. In 2022, the National Weather Service office in Louisville referred to a possible EF5 damage location at a demolished house, where a pickup truck was blown away and never found and a backhoe was deposited into the basement of the house. EF4 damage occurred in Indiana; the maximum damage in Kentucky was rated EF2. EF4 damage occurred in Indiana; max damage in Kentucky was rated EF2.
| March 2 | 2012 | United States | Kentucky | Crittenden, Piner, Morning View | 4 | 8 | NWS |
2012 Crittenden–Piner tornado — A wedge tornado produced by the same cell as the Henryville tornado that completely swept away five frame homes, two of which were anchored to their foundations, though the anchoring mechanisms were too widely spaced, negating a higher rating than low-end EF4. Further along the path, low-end EF4 damage continued as two anchored brick homes were completely leveled and multiple outbuildings were obliterated. Extremely intense vehicle damage occurred in this area as multiple vehicles were lofted long distances through the air and mangled. One vehicle was carried over 600 yards from where it originated. Many large trees were also snapped and uprooted in this area, including some that were completely denuded and sustained severe debarking.
| April 14 | 2012 | United States | Kansas | Kanopolis Lake, Marquette, Falun, Smolan, Bavaria, Salina | 0 | 0 | NWS |
2012 Kanopolis Lake−Salina tornado — A large, violent, and long-tracked tornado caused damage to farms along its path. At one farmstead, a house was swept away with only part of a staircase left on the foundation. Many large trees in this area were shredded and debarked, a car was tossed and flipped onto its roof, and a gravel road was scoured and dug out to a depth of around 5 inches (13 cm). a metal road sign that originated near Kanopolis Lake was found 27 miles away at the Salina Municipal Golf Course.
| February 10 | 2013 | United States | Mississippi | West Hattiesburg, Hattiesburg, Petal | 0 | 71 | NWS |
2013 Hattiesburg, Mississippi tornado — A large multiple-vortex wedge tornado that damaged or destroyed hundreds of structures. Damage intensity throughout the cities impacted ranged from EF2 to EF3 with only a single small pocket of EF4 damage. Around Oak Grove High School, a well-built brick home was completely flattened with debris scattered downwind. Nearby trees were denuded and debarked, indicating low-end EF4 intensity.
| March 21 | 2013 | Australia | Victoria | Mulwala | 0 | 80 | Bureau of Meteorology |
A large, multiple-vortex stovepipe that snapped, denuded and partially debarked numerous trees and damaged numerous structures. A small hut was swept clean from its foundation and ground scouring was observed in the same area, indicating EF4 damage. Further down the path, a well-built brick home sustained total roof and exterior wall loss and some reinforced concrete poles were snapped.
| May 15 | 2013 | United States | Texas | Granbury | 6 | 54 | NWS |
2013 Granbury tornado — A large, slow-moving tornado that impacted the Rancho Brazos subdivision, damaging or destroying most of the homes. Several of the homes were completely destroyed, and a few were wiped clean from their foundations. Trees were debarked and vehicles were tossed in the area as well.
| May 18 | 2013 | United States | Kansas | Rozel | 0 | 0 | NWS |
2013 Rozel tornado — A large cone-shaped tornado that damaged or destroyed five farm homes. A large 1,000 US gallons (3,800 L) propane tank was ripped off of its concrete foundation and tossed 0.25 mi (400 m) and ground scouring was observed further down the tornado's path. A Doppler on Wheels recorded surface winds of 165 to 185 mph (266 to 298 km/h) within the tornado, indicating EF4 intensity.
| May 19 | 2013 | United States | Oklahoma | Shawnee, Pottawatomie County | 2 | 10 | NWS |
2013 Shawnee tornado — A large, stovepipe tornado that damaged or destroyed numerous structures. Dozens of mobile homes were completely destroyed by the tornado and a permanent home in this area was swept completely away with only the slab foundation remaining and much of the debris blown to the northeast, indicating EF4 intensity. Several trees were denuded and debarked in this area, one of which was found with a truck wrapped around it. The tornado continued across a nearby open field, leaving behind a pronounced swath of ground scouring.
| October 4 | 2013 | United States | Nebraska | Wayne County, Wayne, Dixon County | 0 | 15 | NWS |
2013 Wayne tornado – A large multiple-vortex tornado that caused widespread EF3 damage with pockets of EF4 damage in Wayne, Nebraska. The tornado directly hit the Wayne Municipal Airport, where two hangars were flattened, leading to the destruction of 15 planes, and the AWOS was shredded and scattered over unknown distances. The tornado caused over $50 million in damage.
| October 4 | 2013 | United States | Iowa | Woodbury County, Cherokee County | 0 | 0 | NWS |
2013 Pierson tornado — A massive tornado that damaged or destroyed numerous homes, with some losing their entire roofs, having collapse of walls, and being shifted off of their foundations. Farm equipment was tossed about 400 yards (370 m) at a farmstead south of Pierson, including a large grain cart that put gouges in a road and had its axle and wheels broken off.
| November 17 | 2013 | United States | Illinois | East Peoria, Tazewell, Woodford, LaSalle, Livingston | 3 | 125 | NWS |
2013 Washington, Illinois tornado — A violent tornado tracked along a 46.36 mi (74.61 km) path, for 48 minutes, damaging or destroying nearly 1,000 structures. The tornado then reached its peak intensity as a high-end EF4 with winds estimated at 190 mph (310 km/h) and a damage width extending 0.5 mi (0.80 km) in diameter as it moved into the town of Washington. Entire neighborhoods in Washington were leveled, and some homes were swept clean from their foundations, trees in were denuded and partially debarked, vehicles were thrown, and an auto parts store was completely leveled. A total of 633 homes, seven more businesses and apartment buildings, and 2,500 vehicles were destroyed in Washington. The tornado continued on its path at EF2-EF3 intensity, sweeping away unanchored farm houses and outbuildings. This was the strongest tornado documented in the state of Illinois for the month of November since reliable records began in 1950 and the tornado caused $935 million in damage, making it the 10th costliest tornado in United States history.
| November 17 | 2013 | United States | Illinois | Washington, New Minden | 2 | 2 | NWS |
2013 New Minden tornado — After touching down, the tornado rapidly intensified as it tracked northeastward, striking a small farm at mid-range EF4 intensity with maximum winds estimated to have been 180 mph (290 km/h). The homestead there was completely swept away with little debris left behind, and other buildings on the farm grounds sustained various degrees of damage. Several vehicles on the property were rolled as well. The tornado continued on its path, damaging structures at EF2 intensity with 2 more homes sustaining EF3 damage with total roof loss and collapse of exterior walls.
| April 27 | 2014 | United States | Arkansas | Pulaski County, Northpoint, Mayflower, Vilonia | 16 | 193 | NWS |
2014 Mayflower–Vilonia tornado — Within a minute of forming, the tornado dramatically intensified and struck a small residential area at EF3 intensity. There, two homes were destroyed and another was severely damaged. One of the homes was built with bolts along the foundation perimeter and was reduced to a bare slab, normally indicative of EF5 strength; however, it was found that the anchor bolts were not secured with nuts and washers, and nearby vehicles were not moved, which indicated a lesser intensity. Further down the tornado's track, multiple large, two-story homes were leveled with only piles of debris left on their foundations, indicating EF4 intensity. Large concrete road barriers were blown over and moved, and calculations revealed that this was also likely indicative of EF4 intensity. A recreational vehicle dealership was completely destroyed at EF4 intensity (though meteorologist/civil engineer Tim Marshall applied an EF3 rating at this location due to structural flaws). In Vilonia, numerous structures were destroyed with only piles of debris or bare slabs left behind, and vehicles were thrown hundreds of yards and mangled beyond recognition, some of which were crushed into small balls or stripped down to their frames. In the Parkwood Meadows subdivision, entire rows of homes were reduced to bare slabs, though it was revealed that the homes were nailed rather than bolted to their foundations, preventing an EF5 rating.
| April 28 | 2014 | United States | Mississippi | Louisville, Mississippi Winston County, Mississippi | 10 | 84 | NWS |
2014 Louisville, Mississippi tornado — A violent, rain wrapped, and long-tracked wedge tornado that tracked across northern Mississippi. In Winston County, the tornado reached EF3 strength as it heavily damaged or destroyed several homes and metal chicken houses. Some of the homes sustained collapse of their exterior walls. Slightly further along the path, a large area of trees along sustained extreme denuding and debarking, with only stubs of the largest branches remaining. The severity and consistency of the debarking/denuding was severe enough that surveyors applied an EF4 rating at that location. A large complex of metal chicken houses was obliterated with little trace of them left, killing 220,000 chickens. A brick building and a brick home were swept away, a mobile home was obliterated, and numerous trees were debarked just past the chicken houses. In Louisville, three large factories in an industrial area were completely destroyed and numerous homes sustained EF3 to EF4-strength damage in this area, including one that was reduced to a bare foundation slab.
| June 16 | 2014 | United States | Nebraska | Stanton, Stanton City | 0 | 0 | NWS |
2014 Pilger tornado family — The second tornado and first violent tornado in the Pilger tornado family. Multiple houses and farmhouses were leveled at high-end EF3 to EF4 strength. A car and a pickup truck were lofted and thrown over a quarter-mile, both of which were mangled beyond recognition and numerous trees were debarked.
| June 16 | 2014 | United States | Nebraska | Stanton, Cuming, Wayne, Pilger | 1 | 20 | NWS |
2014 Pilger tornado family — The third tornado and second violent tornado in the Pilger tornado family. Most homes and businesses in Pilger were damaged or completely destroyed, with several being leveled or swept away. Numerous brick buildings in the downtown area were heavily damaged or destroyed, and trees throughout the town were denuded and debarked. While this EF4 tornado was ongoing a twin EF4 occurred to the east. Both tornadoes then reached EF4 strength simultaneously as the paths crossed. Numerous trees were completely debarked in this area, and two farm homes were swept away with only the basements remaining. One of these two homes was hit by both tornadoes. Vehicles were lofted in this area, and over 300 head of cattle were killed. After crossing paths, this tornado swept away one more home before dissipating.
| June 16 | 2014 | United States | Nebraska | Stanton, Cuming, Wayne, Pilger | 1 | 0 | NWS |
2014 Pilger tornado family— The fourth tornado and third violent tornado in the Pilger tornado family. This EF4 tornado formed while the previous tornado was ongoing, becoming twin EF4. Both tornadoes then reached EF4 strength simultaneously as the paths crossed. Numerous trees were completely debarked in this area, and two farm homes were swept away with only the basements remaining. One of these two homes was hit by both tornadoes. Vehicles were lofted in this area, and over 300 head of cattle were killed. This tornado lifted shortly after crossing paths with its twin EF4.
| June 16 | 2014 | United States | Nebraska | Wayne, Dixon, Altona | 0 | 0 | NWS |
2014 Pilger tornado family — The fifth tornado and fourth violent tornado in the Pilger tornado family. This tornado touched down while the first of the Pilger twins was dissipating, temporarily becoming a 2nd twin EF4. This large wedge tornado quickly reached EF4 strength soon after touching down, as it cleanly swept away a farm home. The main Pilger tornado was seen roping out and rotating around the perimeter of this new tornado as it developed. Further down the path, numerous farm homes were swept away, and trees were debarked.
| June 18 | 2014 | United States | South Dakota | Jerauld, Beadle | 0 | 2 | NWS |
2014 Alpena tornado — A large, multiple-vortex tornado that morphed into a stovepipe later in its life-cycle. South of Alpena, the tornado reached EF4 intensity, completely destroying a farmstead. Several outbuildings on the property were destroyed, trees were completely denuded and debarked, and the farmhouse was swept away with only the basement remaining. Farm machinery was tossed and damaged, and a nearby corn field was scoured to bare soil. Additionally, corn fields were heavily scoured west of Alpena before the tornado dissipated.
| July 26 | 2014 | Mongolia | Arkhangai | Khashaat | 0 | 0 | NAMHEM |
Homes and farms were completely leveled or swept away and livestock was killed. Vehicles were thrown and mangled beyond recognition, and significant damage to vegetation occurred as well.
| April 9 | 2015 | United States | Illinois | Lee, Ogle, DeKalb, Illinois, Boone | 2 | 22 | NWS |
2015 Rochelle–Fairdale tornado — An extremely violent and long-lived tornado that damaged or destroyed numerous structures. Well-built homes were leveled and swept from their foundations with debris strewn downwind. Several vehicles parked at these residences were tossed, and wind rowing of debris occurred. One house had its concrete walkway pulled a few inches from its original location, and notable scouring of lawn grass was observed in the subdivision. These structures were estimated to have been impacted by winds near 200 mph (320 km/h), the upper bound of an EF4 tornado. Later in the tornado's track, a row of five homes were completely leveled, two of which were swept away. Anchor bolts were again present at these residences, though the foundations were of cinder-block construction. Intense ground scouring was evident nearby, a car was thrown a full mile, and debris was wind-rowed long distances through fields in this area. Winds were again estimated at 200 mph (320 km/h), with the damage at this location again being near-EF5 in intensity. Further to the northeast, the tornado inflicted high-end EF4 damage as a large farmstead was completely destroyed. A well-constructed barn was obliterated, and a 40 ft (12 m) reinforced concrete silo was reduced to a pile of rubble.
| July 8 | 2015 | Italy | Riviera del Brenta | Dolo, Mira, Veneto | 1 | 72 | NWS |
A large and violent cone-shaped F4 tornado that damaged or destroyed numerous structures. A large, two-story, masonry construction Villa Fini restaurant and hotel from the 17th century, which was almost entirely leveled to the ground in Mira. Damage to this structure was rated F4. An additional small area of F4 damage occurred nearby as several large and very well-built reinforced masonry homes were severely damaged along a canal in town, with collapse of thick reinforced walls observed. One of these homes sustained total collapse of its second floor, with damage to the first floor as well, while nearby trees sustained severe denuding and debarking. No structures were leveled in typical F4 fashion in this area, though surveyors determined that F4-level winds would have been needed to cause the degree of structural damage noted at these homes. Reinforced concrete beams were torn from one home and thrown over 100 yards (91 m) into a field.
| July 13 | 2015 | Brazil | Paraná | Francisco Beltrão | 0 | 19 | PREVOTS |
2015 Francisco Beltrão tornado — A violent tornado struck rural communities of Francisco Beltrão, Paraná, destroying wooden and masonry houses, and leaving only the floor remaining of a brick house, a 5-ton truck was also thrown 50 metres, suffering severe damage to its body, the tornado also debarked several trees, all resulting in 19 people injured and no fatalities. The tornado was estimated in F1–F2 by Simepar, however, in August 2024, a meteorologist from PREVOTS would share a wind speed estimate to lift a 5-ton truck, resulting in winds over 380 km/h (236 mph), resulting in a F4 intensity consensus between PREVOTS meteorologists.
| December 23 | 2015 | United States | Mississippi, Tennessee | Holly Springs, Mississippi | 9 | 36 | NWS |
2015 Holly Springs–Ashland tornado — A violent and deadly wedge tornado that obliterated several mobile homes and damaged or destroyed numerous other structures. EF4 damage occurred in Mississippi; max damage in Tennessee was rated EF3.
| December 26 | 2015 | United States | Texas | Dallas County, Texas, Garland, Texas | 10 | 468 | NWS |
2015 Garland–Rowlett tornado — A violent wedge tornado that affected nearly 600 homes in Dallas County, particularly in the cities of Sunnyvale, Garland, and Rowlett. Of these, nearly 400 were destroyed, including a few well-constructed homes that were completely leveled. Nine of the fatalities occurred when their vehicles were lofted and thrown from an elevated highway bridge.
| May 9 | 2016 | United States | Oklahoma | Katie | 1 | 0 | NWS |
2016 Katie tornado — A violent, stovepipe tornado that damaged or destroyed numerous structures and snapped, uprooted, or debarked many trees. As an EF3, the tornado destroyed a home that was left with only interior walls standing, caused tree damage, stripped of foliage. The tornado also began ground scouring as an EF3. As an EF4, the tornado destroyed a well-built, anchor-bolted brick home which was almost entirely flattened with a large portion of the foundation slab swept clean of debris. Trees in this area were debarked, and extensive ground scouring occurred. Multiple vehicles were thrown and mangled beyond recognition. Another brick house had its roof torn off as well, and multiple power poles were snapped. A poorly anchored frame home was swept cleanly away at high-end EF3 intensity. This tornado was photographed and caught on video by numerous storm chasers.
| May 25 | 2016 | United States | Kansas | Niles, Solomon, Talmage, Abilene, Chapman | 0 | 8 | NWS |
2016 Abilene–Chapman tornado — A violent wedge tornado that damaged or destroyed numerous structures. A large but poorly anchored home was completely flattened. Due to the home being poorly anchored, it was rated as high-end EF3 damage. Shortly afterward, a split-level home was completely swept away, leaving only the basement behind. Anchor bolts were present at this location, though the home's subflooring was poorly anchored, and an EF4 rating was applied. After weakening to an EF2, the tornado strengthened back to a mid-range EF4, where multiple farmsteads were destroyed. One large, anchor-bolted brick farm home was completely leveled and largely swept away with only the basement and a pile of debris was left behind. Part of the concrete foundation was severely cracked from the force of the house being ripped away. Although rated mid-range EF4 with 180 MPH winds, surveyors determined that winds in this area likely approached 200 MPH, though the fact that the site was not completely swept clean of debris prevented a higher rating. While officially rated mid-range EF4, NWS Topeka damage surveyors noted that based on the damage that occurred in rural areas, an EF5 rating may have been necessary had the tornado hit Chapman directly.
| June 23 | 2016 | China | Jiangsu | Funing County, Sheyang County | 98 | 846 | CMA |
2016 Funing tornado — An enormous, violent wedge tornado carved a wide path of destruction through the Funing area of Yancheng in Jiangsu province, at one point reaching a peak width of 4.1 km (2.5 mi) wide. Catastrophic damage occurred in the areas in and around the villages of Laowangcun, Jiqiaocun, Dalaocun, Xuejiagang, Beichencun, and Lixingqiao. Thousands of well-built masonry-construction homes were heavily damaged or destroyed along the path, with many completely leveled. Manufacturing plants, businesses, and rice mills suffered from similar destruction, and multiple large factory buildings were severely damaged at a Canadian Solar plant. Two large school buildings were heavily damaged as well, and multiple large, multi-ton metal shipping containers were lofted and thrown hundreds of yards by the tornado. Damages were calculated at nearly CN¥5 billion (US$760 million). Simin Zou and Xuhui He 2023 claim it was "the worst tornado of all time".
| February 28 | 2017 | United States | Missouri, Illinois | Perryville (Missouri), Rockwood (Illinois), Shawnee National Forest, Ava, Vergennes, Elkville, Christopher | 1 | 12 | NWS |
2017 Perryville tornado — Multiple single-story and two-story homes were completely leveled, some being completely swept off their foundations and least a dozen cars were mangled and destroyed after being thrown 200–300 yd (180–270 m) from a salvage yard. One home was anchor-bolted to its foundation with its wall studs toe-nailed at both the top and bottom, and was completely swept away with only the basement left behind. Despite the high-quality construction, the overall context surrounding this home was not indicative of an intensity greater than mid-range EF4, and maximum winds along this segment of the path were estimated to have peaked at 185 mph (298 km/h). EF4 damage occurred in Missouri; max damage in Illinois was rated EF3.
| April 29 | 2017 | United States | Texas | Eustace, Canton | 2 | 25 | NWS |
2017 Canton tornado — A rain-wrapped wedge that damaged or destroyed multiple structures and numerous trees were denuded and sustained severe debarking. A well-built two-story brick home was completely leveled in this area, with much of the foundation slab swept clean of debris.
| June 18 | 2017 | Russia | Ural | Maloye Pes'yanovo | 0 | Unknown | ESSL, RHMC |
Several homes sustained major damage as well as four well-built log homes which were completely leveled. Vehicles were damaged, and numerous trees were snapped or denuded, some of which sustained severe debarking.
| August 11 | 2017 | China | Inner Mongolia | Chifeng | 5 (Note: The casualties were all due to one of these three tornadoes, but it is unknown which one.) | 58 (Note: The casualties were all due to one of these three tornadoes, but it is unknown which one.) | CMA |
Two large brick residences were completely leveled, with masonry scattered long distances from the destroyed structures. Other nearby buildings sustained varying degrees of damage.
| August 11 | 2017 | China | Inner Mongolia | Chifeng | 5 (Note: The casualties were all due to one of these three tornadoes, but it is unknown which one.) | 58 (Note: The casualties were all due to one of these three tornadoes, but it is unknown which one.) | CMA |
Multiple homes were leveled.
| August 11 | 2017 | China | Inner Mongolia | Chifeng | 5 (Note: The casualties were all due to one of these three tornadoes, but it is unknown which one.) | 58 (Note: The casualties were all due to one of these three tornadoes, but it is unknown which one.) | CMA |
Devastating damage to numerous structures, with brick homes being leveled and swept away. Tractors were thrown and mangled, reinforced concrete power poles were broken, trees were denuded and debarked, and branches were found impaled into walls of structures that remained standing. A large water tank was allegedly found 4 mi (6.4 km) away from where it originated.
| June 12 | 2018 | Brazil | Rio Grande do Sul | Coxilha, Vila Lângaro, Água Santa, Ciríaco | 1 | Unknown | PREVOTS, MetSul Meteorologia |
Coxilha tornado — Three large trucks were overturned and one 14-ton truck was thrown dozens of meters off the highway into a field. Swaths of trees were debarked, wooden homes were completely swept away, and masonry walls and homes were largely destroyed. Debris was wind-rowed, made into "debris missiles" that penetrated concrete walls, or lofted up to 70 kilometres (43 mi) away. Ten aviaries were also destroyed, killing hundreds of thousands of chickens. It was the first violent tornado in South America in nearly a decade, although its rating is disputed.
| August 3 | 2018 | Canada | Manitoba | Alonsa, Silver Ridge, Lake Manitoba | 1 | 2 | EC |
2018 Alonsa tornado - Multiple homes and mobile homes were damaged or completely destroyed and numerous vehicles, trailers, and tractors were thrown and demolished. A couple of homes were leveled or swept away, with only the foundations remaining. Aerial photography revealed a distinct ground scar left behind by the tornado. This was the only violent tornado in North America during 2018 and the first violent tornado in Canada since an F5 tornado struck Elie, Manitoba in 2007.
| January 27 | 2019 | Cuba | La Habana | Havana | 8 | 190+ | INSMET |
2019 Havana tornado — Numerous well-built masonry homes and businesses were damaged or destroyed. Concrete frame buildings sustained major structural damage and cars were thrown or crushed under debris. At least 1,238 of the 4,800 homes affected were seriously damaged, with 500 totally destroyed and 757 partially destroyed. At least 224 homes had completely lost their roofs and 124 lost part of it.
| March 3 | 2019 | United States | Alabama, Georgia | Beauregard, Dupree, Smith Station (Alabama), Baughville (Georgia), Talbotton | 23 | 90 | NWS |
2019 Beauregard tornado — A long-tracked wedge tornado caused a massive swath of large trees to be completely mowed down and debarked; numerous manufactured home were thrown and obliterated, with the metal frames of several homes being twisted around trees or otherwise never recovered. A well-built, anchor-bolted brick home was leveled with a portion of the slab foundation swept clean of debris. Several block-foundation frame homes were leveled or swept completely away in this area, with wind-rowing of debris being noted. Multiple vehicles were lofted through the air and mangled beyond recognition. A large semi-truck was flipped over and wrapped around the base of a tree and a high-tension power line tower was toppled. EF4 damage occurred in Alabama; max damage in Georgia was rated EF3.
| May 27 | 2019 | United States | Ohio | Brookville, Trotwood, Dayton | 0 | 166 | NWS |
2019 Dayton tornado — As an EF3 in Trotwood, numerous homes were damaged or destroyed, including several well-built homes that sustained total loss of their roofs and exterior walls. Widespread, major damage occurred in Shiloh. No buildings were leveled in typical EF4 fashion at this location, but damage surveyors determined that such severe damage to well-built structures was indicative of low-end EF4 winds. A massive swath of large hardwood trees was completely mowed down and debarked. The trees that remained standing were completely stripped of limbs and bark, with only stubs of the largest branches remaining. Surveyors also determined that such extreme tree damage was indicative of EF4 intensity.
| May 28 | 2019 | United States | Kansas | Lawrence, Linwood | 0 | 18 | NWS |
2019 Linwood tornado — A large, multiple-vortex, rain-wrapped wedge tornado that damaged or destroyed numerous structures and snapped, uprooted, or debarked many trees. An anchor-bolted frame home was completely leveled and partially swept away. All that remained at this site was the home's basement and a pile of debris, and this point of damage was rated EF4. Scientific probes shot into the tornado by a research team recorded a windspeed measurement of 190 mph at some point.
| July 3 | 2019 | China | Liaoning | Kaiyuan | 6 | 190 | CMA |
A violent stovepipe tornado caused major structural damage to numerous buildings, with roofs removed and exterior walls collapsed. Multiple industrial buildings and factories were also significantly damaged or completely destroyed. The most intense damage occurred at a large reinforced concrete cafeteria building which was almost entirely leveled. Trees were snapped, twisted, and debarked, power poles were snapped, and farm fields outside the city became a site for heavy ground scouring.

== See also ==
- Tornado intensity and damage
- List of tornadoes and tornado outbreaks
  - List of F5 and EF5 tornadoes
  - List of F4 and EF4 tornadoes
    - List of F4 and EF4 tornadoes (2020–present)
    - List of F4 tornadoes (1950–1959)
    - List of F4 tornadoes (1960–1969)
- List of F3, EF3, and IF3 tornadoes (2020–present)
- List of tornadoes striking downtown areas
- Tornado myths
