= Phillip Hamman =

American soldier

Philip Hamman
- Spouse: Christina Hamman (née Cook)
- Military career
- Other work: Baptist preacher

Phillip Hamman was an American soldier in the Revolutionary War of 1775–1783. In 1823 he was ordained preacher of the Friendship Baptist Church of Fackler, Alabama. In 1970 the Tidence Lane chapter of the Daughters of the American Revolution placed a marker on his grave.
