= Fackler, Alabama =

Unincorporated community in Alabama, United States

- Unincorporated community
- Location within Alabama Location within the United States
- Coordinates: 34°47′33″N 85°54′36″W
- Country: United States
- State: Alabama
- County: Jackson
- Elevation: 610 ft (186 m)
- Time zone: UTC-6 (Central (CST))
  - Summer (DST): UTC-5 (CDT)
- ZIP code: 35746
- Area code: 256
- GNIS feature ID: 118100

Fackler, also known as Flackler, Facler, or Fackler's Station, is an unincorporated community in Jackson County, Alabama, United States. Fackler is located on the former Memphis and Charleston Railroad, and its post office was established in 1869. During the Chattanooga campaign of the American Civil War, the 90th Illinois Volunteer Infantry Regiment was based out of Fackler. Phillip Hamman, known as "The Savior of Greenbrier", was formerly buried near Fackler, on the grounds of his plantation home at Hammon Hollow in Inglis-Middleton Cemetery. (Hammon is another popular spelling of his name.)
