= 2011 Washington–Goldsby tornado =

2011 EF4 tornado in Oklahoma

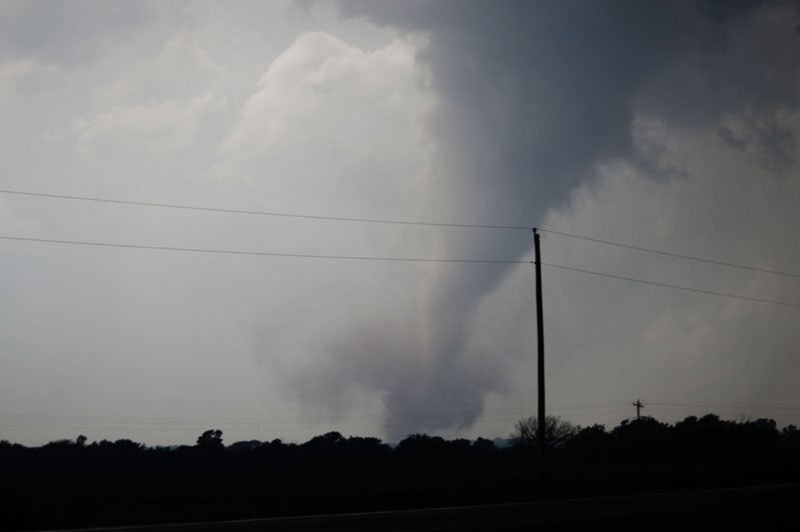
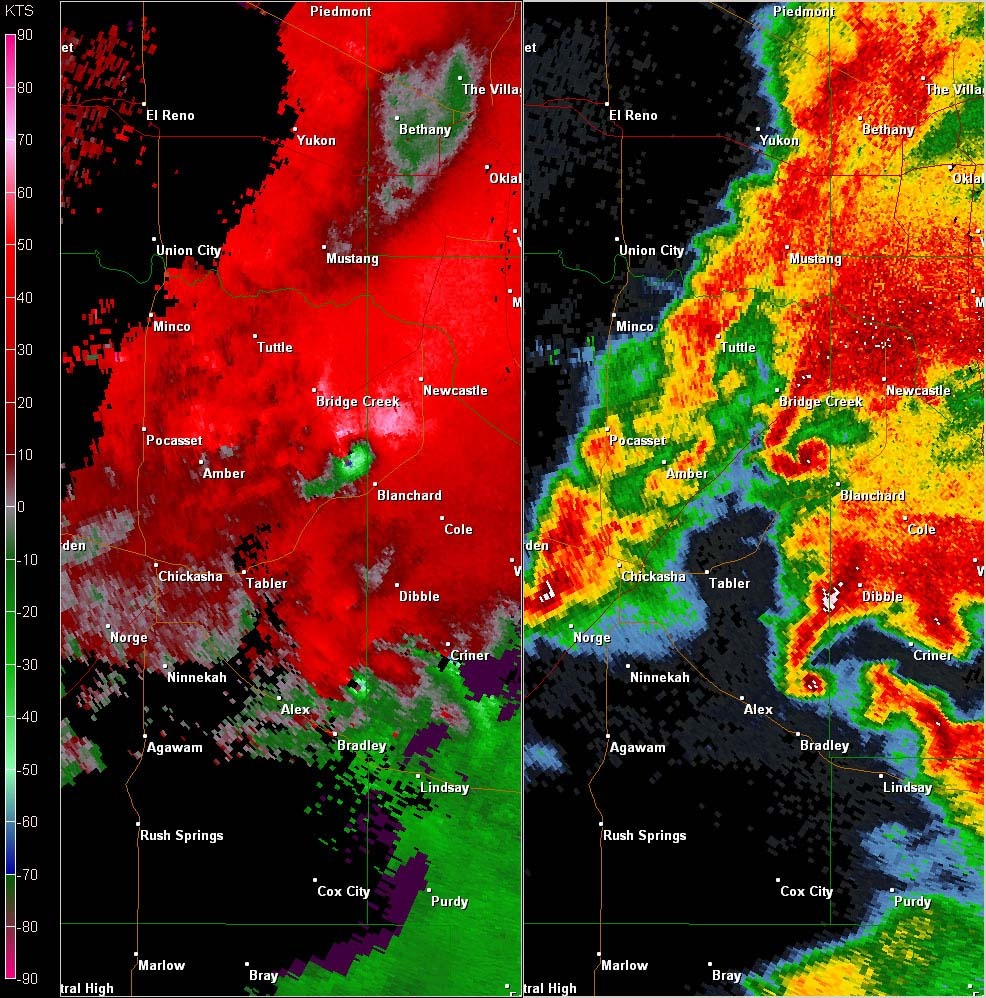
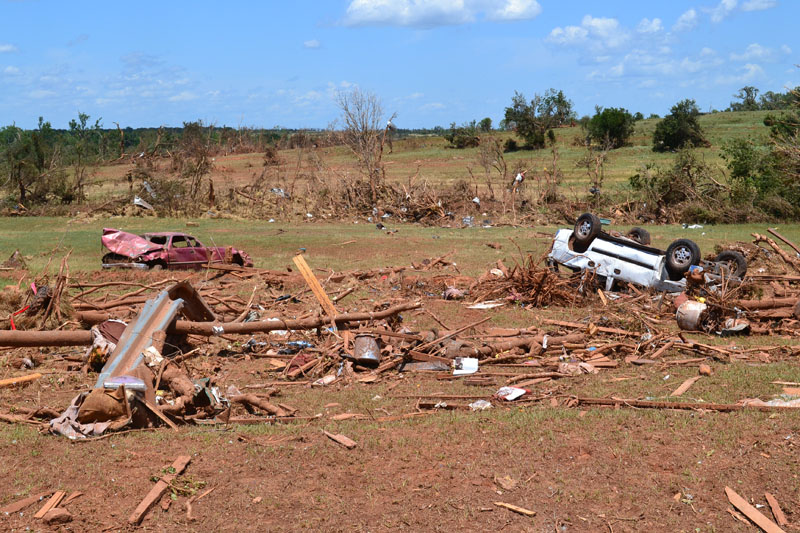
- Clockwise from top: The tornado as seen from I-35; extreme ground scouring and vehicle damage left behind by the tornado; a Next-Generation Radar scan of the Chickasha tornado (north) and the Goldsby tornado (south).

Meteorological history
- Formed: May 24, 2011, 5:26 p.m. CDT (UTC−05:00)
- Dissipated: May 24, 2011, 6:05 p.m. CDT (UTC−05:00)
- Duration: 39 minutes

EF4 tornado
- on the Enhanced Fujita scale
- Max width: 880 yards (0.50 mi; 0.80 km)
- Path length: 23 miles (37 km)
- Highest winds: 200 mph (320 km/h)

Overall effects
- Fatalities: 0
- Injuries: 61
- Damage: Unknown
- Areas affected: Grady and McClain Counties; specifically around Bradley, Washington and Goldsby, Oklahoma, United States.
- Part of the tornado outbreak sequence of May 21–26, 2011 and Tornadoes of 2011

During the early evening hours of May 24, 2011, an extremely violent EF4 tornado, known as the Washington–Goldsby tornado, struck around the towns of Bradley, Washington, and Goldsby in the U.S. state of Oklahoma. It was one of several violent tornadoes of a massive tornado outbreak sequence in late May. The tornado remained on the ground for a total of 39 minutes, traveled 23.0 miles (37.0 km), and resulted in 61 injuries, but no fatalities.

The supercell thunderstorm responsible for this tornado first formed earlier in the day over Grady County, where it continued to move northeast towards McClain County, intensifying further. Eventually, the tornado touched down at 5:26 p.m. CDT (22:26 UTC) northwest of the town of Bradley initially producing EF0 and EF1 damage as it crossed SH-19. Continuing to the northeast, the tornado intensified further to EF3 strength as it passed through rural areas of Grady County, snapping and debarking numerous trees. The tornado continued moving northeast, weakening to EF2 intensity as it crossed the county line into McClain County. The tornado restrengthened again and produce high-end EF4 damage in multiple areas such as in Washington and outside of Goldsby. After this, the tornado continued its track north, further weakening at a rapid pace, conducting EF0 damage near David Jay Perry Airport and dissipating just north of Goldsby at 6:05 p.m. CDT (23:05 UTC).

== Meteorological synopsis ==
=== Setup ===
Early on May 24, a strong upper-level trough (an elongated region of low atmospheric pressure aloft) advanced towards the Great Plains out of the southwestern United States and took on a negative tilt, becoming oriented northwest to southeast.

At the same time, southerly flow brought moisture north over Texas and the southern Great Plains, allowing dew points in central Oklahoma to reach 18–21 °C (64–70 °F). This moisture, with temperatures in the mid 80 °F (27 °C) range, allowed for ample convective available potential energy (or CAPE, a measure of atmospheric instability); values reached 2500–4000 J/kg. Mid-level lapse rates were nearly dry adiabatic.

In the late morning, a shortwave embedded within the main longwave trough advanced more rapidly, pushing the dryline into western Oklahoma, where it met the already-present moisture. The shortwave's advance also brought strong wind shear and "incredibly high" storm-relative helicity values of more than 500 m^{2}s^{−2}. The convergence of all these factors promised the development of intense convective thunderstorms.

=== Forecast ===
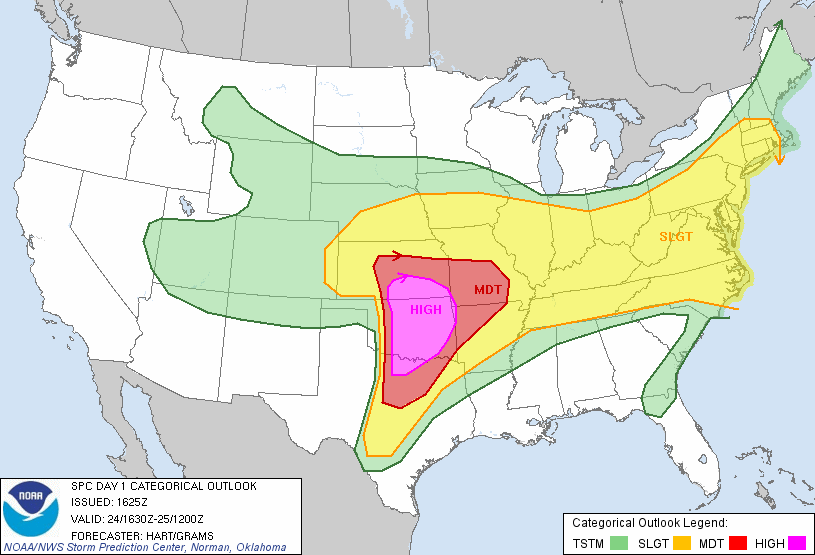
The National Weather Service Storm Prediction Center's Day 1 Convective Outlook for May 24, showing the Categorical Graphic

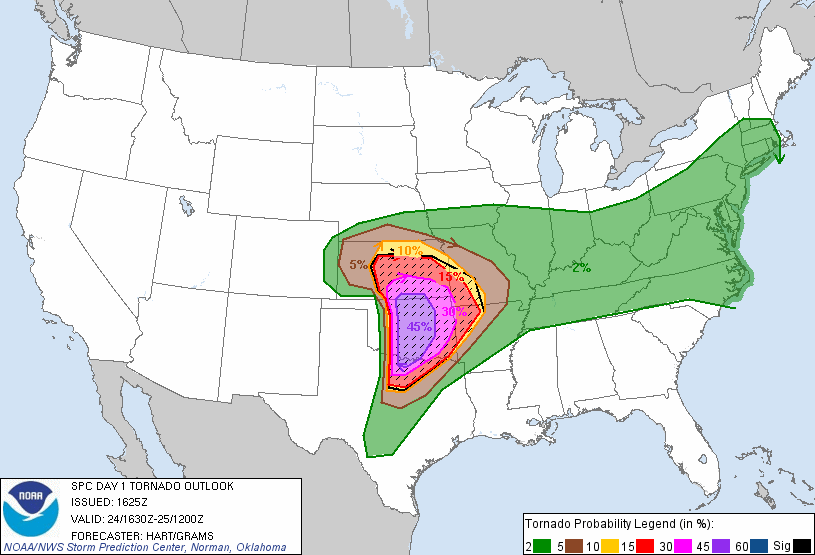
The probability of a tornado within 25 miles of a point (cross-hatched area: 10% or greater probability of EF2+ tornadoes)

This risk was anticipated by the National Weather Service's Storm Prediction Center (SPC), and its local forecast office in Norman, Oklahoma. The Storm Prediction Center's outlooks for severe weather culminated in a high risk area being delineated over the Great Plains for May 24. Issued at 11:25 a.m. CDT (16:25 UTC), the Storm Prediction Center's convective outlook for the day highlighted the tornado risk, which included central Oklahoma inside a large region of a 45% chance of a tornado touchdown within 25 miles (40 km) of any given point, and a 10% or greater chance of a significant (EF2+) tornado within that same 25-mile (40 km) radius.

...AN INTENSE OUTBREAK OF TORNADOES AND WIDESPREAD SEVERE THUNDERSTORMS IS EXPECTED LATER TODAY OVER PORTIONS OF KS/OK/TX...

...WITH ALL CONDITIONS FAVORING THE POTENTIAL FOR LONG-TRACKED STRONG/VIOLENT TORNADOES AND VERY LARGE HAIL OVER PORTIONS OF NORTH TX...CENTRAL OK...AND CENTRAL KS.

— NWS Storm Prediction Center (SPC), May 24, 2011 1630 UTC Day 1 Convective Outlook

At 12:50 p.m. CDT (17:50 UTC), the Storm Prediction Center issued a particularly dangerous situation (PDS) tornado watch, to remain in effect until 10:00 p.m., for most of central Oklahoma extending from the state border with Kansas down through the Oklahoma City metropolitan area and into northern Texas. The text of the tornado watch again warned of the possible development of "destructive tornadoes... …some of which could be long-tracked and strong to violent."

== Tornado summary ==
=== Formation and track in Grady County ===
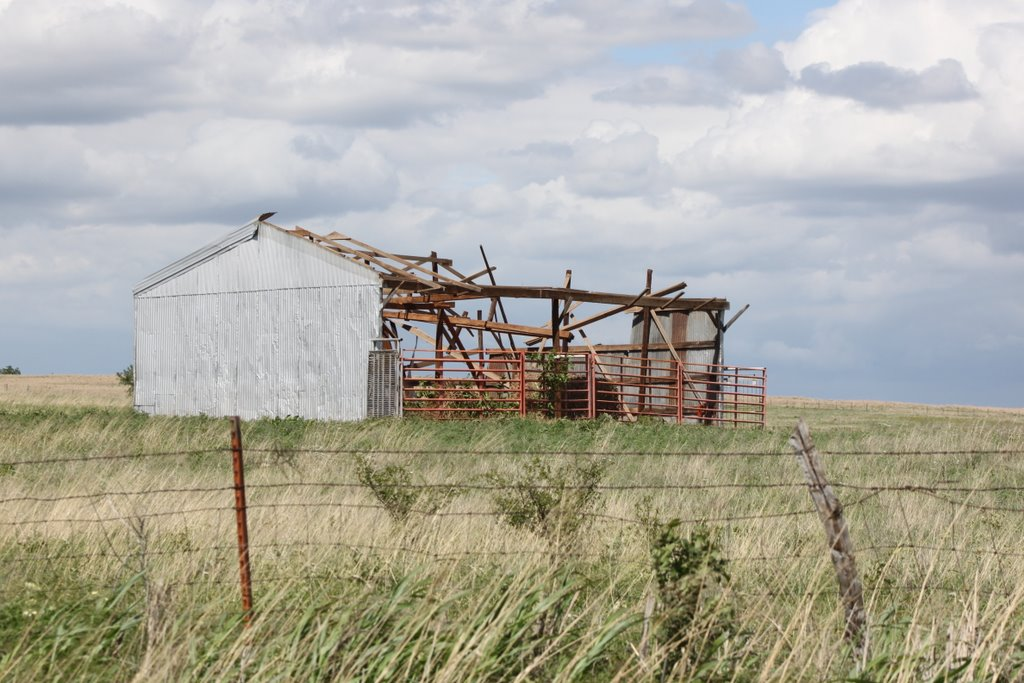
High-end EF1 damage to a barn on Ash Road

At 5:26 p.m. CDT (22:26 UTC), the tornado touched down northwest of Bradley taking on a narrow funnel-like shape. As the tornado began snapping off multiple branches at EF0 intensity before crossing SH-19 where it continued damaging trees at low-end EF0 intensity. The tornado trekked northeast across rural Grady County, where it intensified, snapping trees at EF1-EF2 intensity along the Washita River. Afterward, the tornado collapsed the walls of a small barn on Ash Road at high-end EF1 intensity before continuing northwest, further damaging isolated structures and trees at EF0 and EF1 intensity respectively. As the tornado approached River Road, the tornado intensified to EF3 intensity, severely debarking multiple trees and scouring the ground in the area. As the tornado approached the county line, the tornado continued to debark trees at EF3 intensity near Grumman Road before crossing the County Line into McClain County. The tornado caused no injuries or fatalities in Grady County.

=== Peak intensity near Washington ===
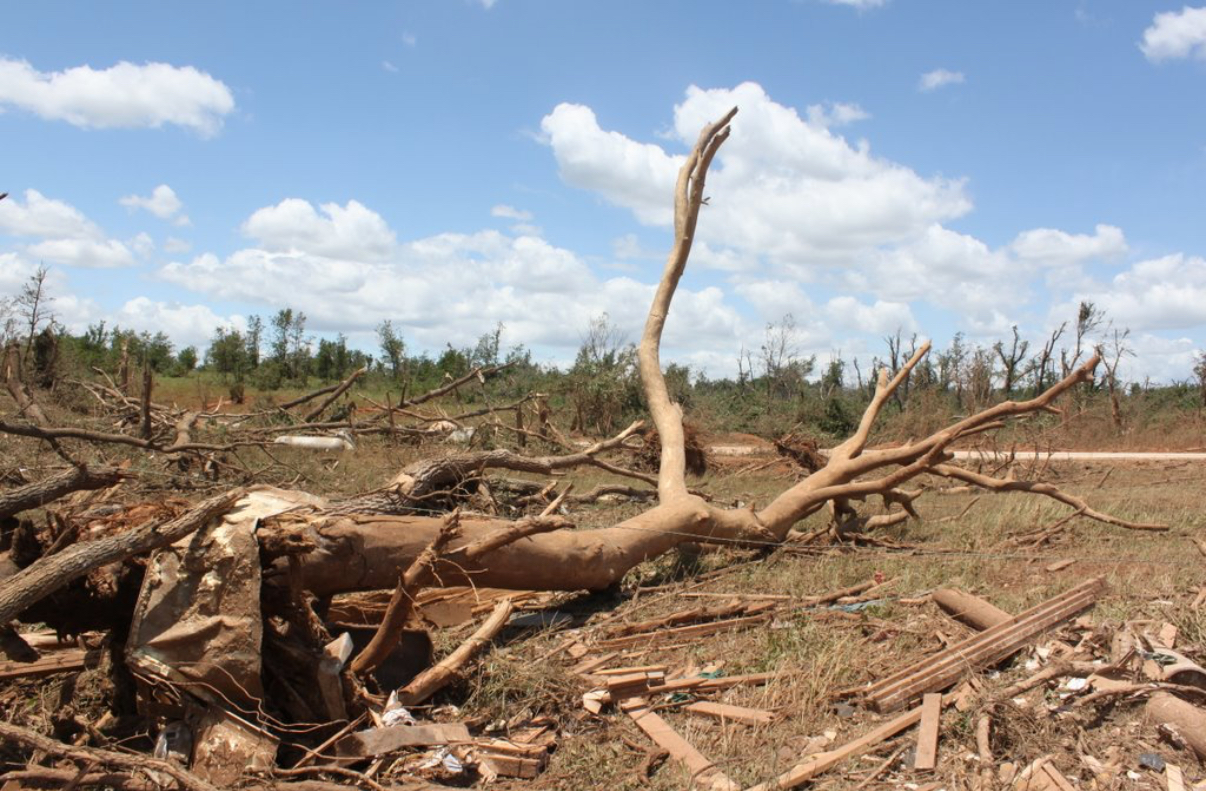
Trees near 170th Street fully debarked

The tornado slightly weakened when it crossed into McClain County. One home along County Line Avenue had its roof torn off. The tornado expanded to 600 yd (550 m) wide and strengthened to high-end EF2 intensity. The tornado remained mostly rural areas. When it suddenly intensified to EF3 intensity, debarking multiple hardwood trees. A group of trees south of 170th street was subjected to high-end EF3 winds, severely debarking them. One mobile home northeast of the tree line had also been destroyed. As the tornado crossed 170th street, two homes were destroyed at low-end EF4 intensity. Trees near this location were fully debarked.

The tornado continued on at low-end EF4 intensity. A car was thrown 250 yd (230 m) from its original location prior to the tornado, reducing the car down to its chassis. Another car northeast of this location was thrown 0.25 mi (0.40 km) and split into three pieces. The tornado weakened to high-end EF3 intensity, before re-intensifying to low-end EF4 intensity, tearing apart a harvester and lofting it 180 yd (160 m) uphill. The tornado then rapidly intensified to high-end EF4 intensity. Multiple homes along SH-76 were swept away. One well built home was completely destroyed. Little to no debris was left on the foundation of the home. An automobile southwest of this home was left “almost unrecognizable” by the tornado. The chassis of the tornado was bent and the body of the automobile was no where in sight. The tornado went over rural areas, but impacted a home, toppling all walls of the home. The tornado was at ~700 yd (640 m) at this point and it was approaching 180th street.

The tornado weakened after crossing 180th street at EF3 intensity. The tornado shrunk in width and weakened further to high-end EF2 intensity just after Criner Creek. The tornado continued inflicting EF2 damage while widening in size again. The tornado crossed Portland Avenue, trees near this location were debarked at low-end EF3 intensity, one home at 209th Street had its roof fully torn away. Just before SH-39, it quickly intensified to high-end EF4 intensity, sweeping away a very well-built home, with anchor bolts being every 1.5 feet along Cedar Lane, two other homes at this location were also demolished, nearby trees were also debarked and caked in mud. Still at EF4 intensity, two homes were destroyed. Later, a home on 230th street was destroyed at high-end EF4 intensity. The tornado weakened to EF3 intensity, before sweeping two homes off their foundations near 240th street. At this point, the tornado reached its peak width of 880 yards (800 m). By now the tornado began thinning out and weakening to EF2 intensity. The tornado was now directly west of Washington.

=== Track into Goldsby and dissipation ===
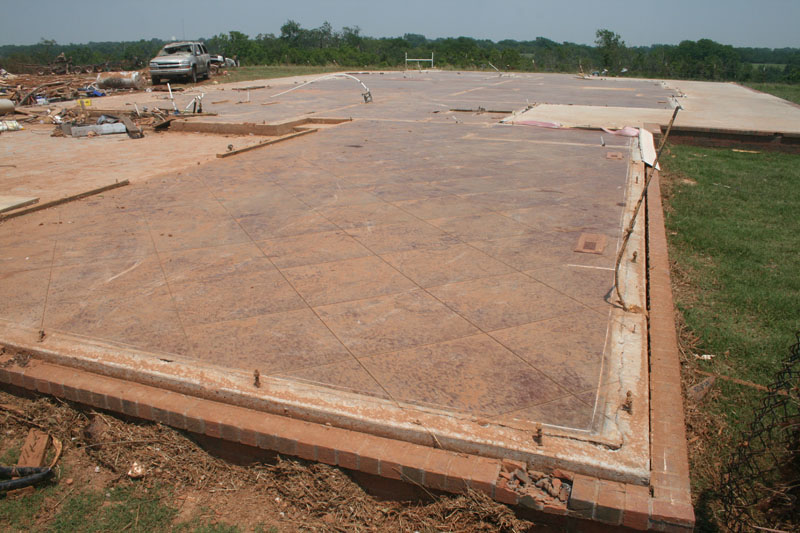
A large, well-built home that was reduced to a bare slab just outside of Goldsby at high-end EF4 intensity

The tornado began rapidly weakening and thinning out in width. The tornado went through rural fields, impacting an oil well and rolling it over multiple times before stopping in a field. Multiple trees along 260th Street were uprooted at EF2 intensity. A home on the same road had high-end EF0 damage to its roof. It briefly strengthened to EF3 intensity destroying a brick home’s walls. The tornado weakened back to EF1 intensity before briefly intensifying to EF3 winds once again. An electrical pole along State Highway 74B was knocked over at EF2 intensity as the tornado continued North. A mobile home nearby was thrown and completely destroyed at EF3 intensity. The tornado tracked near Goldsby, causing intense damage to homes as the tornado rapidly intensified to high-end EF4 intensity, sweeping two well-built homes off of their foundations at 200 mph. This is also the location where most photos of the tornado were captured.

The tornado began to weaken further tracking over mostly rural farmland, impacting little structures; however, still did EF1–EF2 damage to trees. The tornado then struck another home, causing most of its outer walls to collapse at EF3 intensity. As the tornado approached chestnut road, it weakened to EF1 intensity snapping multiple trees. By now the tornado had weakened severely producing high-end EF0 damage south of David Jay Perry Airport before the tornado finally lifted at 6:05 p.m. CDT (23:05 UTC).

== Aftermath ==
=== Damage ===
Along its track, the tornado severely damaged or destroyed 104 homes, including multiple that were completely swept off their foundations. Near the Grady-McClain County line, multiple trees were uprooted at EF3 intensity. 11 homes along 170th street and SH-76 were damaged at high-end EF4 intensity with collapsed walls, multiple trees nearby were also uprooted at EF3-EF4 intensity. Multiple cars and harvesters near 180th street were destroyed including one which was thrown 250 yd (230 m) and another which was thrown 0.25 mi (0.40 km) and split into 3 separate pieces. The tornado impacted a populated subdivision along SH-39, where 12 more homes were destroyed at EF3-EF4 intensity, mainly along 212th street where multiple homes were swept off their foundations. West of Washington, another four homes were destroyed along 230th street with damage estimated between winds of 170–190 mph (270–310 km/h). Near 240th street an oil rig well was ripped out of the ground and rolled over several times, two other homes were destroyed at this location. As the tornado impacted areas near Goldsby, two brand new homes were destroyed along SH-74B at 200 mph (320 km/h). Both homes were found to be built with extensive anchor bolts for tornado resistance. Along Chestnut Road a large family home had most of its outer walls collapse at mid-range EF3 intensity before the tornado dissipated shortly after.

In total, the tornado inflicted severe damage to areas across McClain County although monetary damages were not available.

=== Recovery efforts ===
In the following hours of the tornado, search and rescue efforts quickly began, with first responders rescuing many trapped under their homes near the Washington and Goldsby area, as roads were closed to help with rescue efforts. Survivors of the tornado were noted attempting to find their belongings amongst the wreckage. In the immediate aftermath 0 fatalities were reported although 61 were confirmed to be injured by emergency services.

Within the aftermath of the corresponding tornado outbreak sequence, Oklahoma governor Mary Newt Fallin declared a state of emergency in 68 counties on May 24, including McClain and Gary before conducting an aerial survey of affected areas. On May 29, Governor Fallin requested that the White House issue a federal major disaster declaration for 7 seven Oklahoma counties which again, included both Gary and McClain county. Fallin's request was approved by US president Barack Obama on June 6.

In September 2011, governor Fallin and state emergency management officials announced the Sooner-Safe Room Rebate Program, using $1 million in funds from the Federal Emergency Management Agency, which distributed cash rebates via a statewide drawing to reimburse up to 500 Oklahomans seeking to build storm shelters. Victims of the May 24 tornado outbreak were among those who received priority selection for the rebates.

=== Possible EF5 intensity ===
The National Weather Service determined the path length for the tornado was to be 23.0 miles (37.0 km). Along said path, multiple areas of high-end EF4 damage were found. Multiple homes were found to have installed anchor bolts. One of which was a particularly well-built home along Cedar Lane, which had anchor bolt spacing up to 18 inches (1.5 ft), was completely swept off its foundation. While normally indicative of EF5 intensity, surveyors noted that around the same time the frame of a large mobile home had slammed into the house, making it impossible to determine if the tornado was EF4 or EF5 in intensity. This, combined with other minor discrepancies, such as minor anchoring issues and a nearby jacuzzi still being usable, the rating was capped at EF4 with maximum winds estimated at 200 mph (320 km/h), just one short of the requirement for an EF5 rating (201 mph (323 km/h).

On October 1, 2019, Yuko Murayama, Dimiter Velev, and Plamena Zlateva edited a book of revised academically peer-reviewed papers which listed all EF5 tornadoes since 2007 and directly rated the 2011 Washington-Goldsby tornado as a EF5 tornado along with other powerful tornadoes that may had EF5 intensity until 2014.

Later on January 23, 2025, Anthony W. Lyza with the National Severe Storms Laboratory along with Harold E. Brooks and Makenzie J. Kroca with the University of Oklahoma’s School of Meteorology published a paper to the American Meteorological Society, where they stated the tornado in Goldsby was an "EF5 candidate" and opined that the EF5 starting wind speed should be 190 mph (310 km/h) instead of 201 mph (323 km/h).

== See also ==
- Tornado outbreak sequence of May 21–26, 2011
- List of F4 and EF4 tornadoes (2010–2019)
- List of F5, EF5, and IF5 tornadoes
- Tornadoes of 2011
- 2011 Chickasha–Blanchard tornado - Another EF4 tornado the same day which also had windspeeds up to 200 mph (320 km/h).
- 2011 El Reno–Piedmont tornado - A long-track and extremely violent EF5 tornado that occurred north in Oklahoma the same day.
- 2016 Abilene–Chapman tornado - A long-lived and powerful EF4 tornado in Kansas which also had plausible EF5 intensity.
