= 2011 Chickasha–Blanchard tornado =

Powerful EF4 tornado in central Oklahoma in 2011

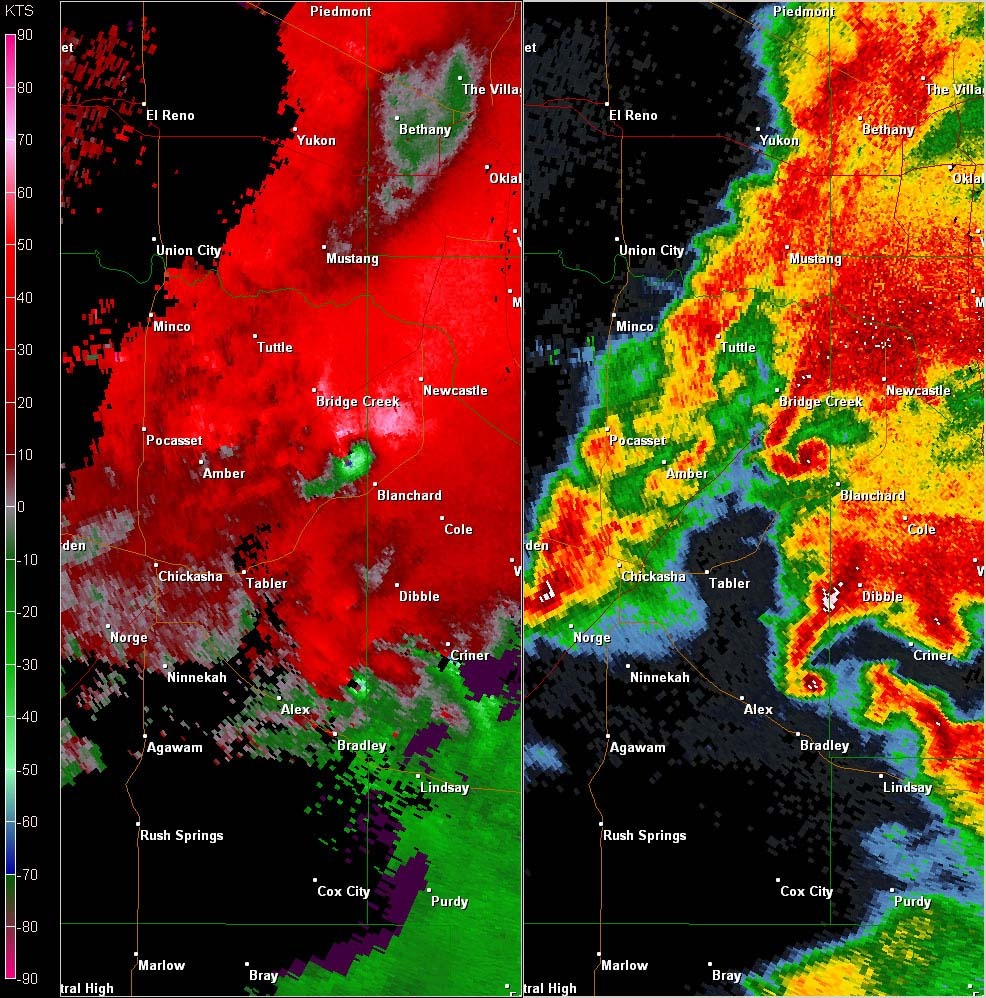
- Clockwise from top: A view of the tornado as it was intensifying near Chickasha; High-end EF4 damage to a frame residence north of Blanchard; Radar imagery of two tornado-producing storm systems, with the Chickasha tornado in progress in the northern cell

Meteorological history
- Formed: May 24, 2011, 5:06 p.m. CDT (UTC−05:00)
- Dissipated: May 24, 2011, 6:01 p.m. CDT (UTC−05:00)
- Duration: 55 minutes

EF4 tornado
- on the Enhanced Fujita scale
- Max width: 880 yd (800 m)
- Path length: 33.3 mi (53.6 km)
- Highest winds: 200 mph (320 km/h)

Overall effects
- Fatalities: 1
- Injuries: 48
- Areas affected: Grady, McClain, and Cleveland Counties, Oklahoma; particularly Chickasha, Blanchard, and Newcastle
- Part of the Tornado outbreak sequence of May 21–26, 2011 and Tornadoes of 2011

In the late afternoon hours of May 24, 2011, a large and extremely violent EF4 tornado impacted the southern side of Chickasha, Oklahoma and rural areas around Blanchard and Newcastle. This tornado, commonly referred to as the Chickasha–Blanchard tornado, or the Chickasha–Blanchard–Newcastle tornado per the National Weather Service, killed one person and injured 48 others along a 33.3 miles (53.6 km) path, with a peak path width of 880 yards (0.50 miles). This tornado was part of a widespread tornado outbreak sequence that took place across the contiguous United States from May 21–26, 2011, and was one of the strongest tornadoes in the sequence, being tied for the second-strongest tornado of the May 24 outbreak, behind the El Reno–Piedmont tornado.

The tornado touched down south of Chickasha at 5:06 p.m. CDT, quickly strengthening to EF2 intensity, destroying mobile homes and doing severe roof damage to apartments and other buildings. After leaving the city, the tornado destroyed a home at EF4 strength. Trees were debarked, and cars were damaged or demolished. The tornado continued northeast, causing severe tree damage, destroying a home, and scouring away topsoil mostly at EF3 to EF4 intensity. The tornado briefly weakened before strengthening to EF3 intensity, debarking multiple trees, obliterating manufactured homes, and scouring inches of soil. The tornado rapidly intensified to near EF5 strength, damaging and destroying several well-built homes north of Blanchard. Numerous trees were blown down and debarked and vehicles were destroyed, another home was leveled as the tornado continued moving northeast. The tornado weakened, causing significant damage to homes and demolishing outbuildings around Newcastle before dissipating north of the Canadian River.

== Meteorological synopsis ==
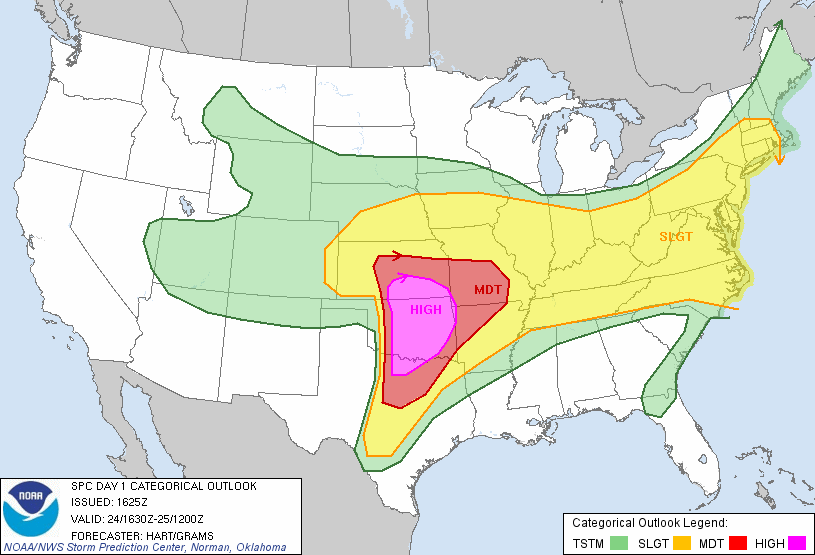
Storm Prediction Center issuing a high-risk for northern Texas, most of Oklahoma, and southern Kansas

Early on May 24, a strong upper-level trough (an elongated region of low atmospheric pressure aloft) advanced towards the Great Plains out of the southwestern United States and took on a negative tilt, becoming oriented northwest to southeast.At the same time, southerly flow brought moisture north over Texas and the southern Great Plains, allowing dew points in Central Oklahoma to reach 18–21 °C (64–70 °F). This moisture, with temperatures in the mid 80 °F (27 °C) range, allowed for ample convective available potential energy (or CAPE, a measure of atmospheric instability); values reached 2500–4000 J/kg. Mid-level lapse rates were nearly dry adiabatic.

In the late morning, a shortwave embedded within the main longwave trough advanced more rapidly, pushing the dryline into western Oklahoma, where it met the already-present moisture. The shortwave's advance also brought strong wind shear and "incredibly high" storm-relative helicity values of more than 500 m^{2}s^{−2}. The convergence of all these factors promised the development of intense convective thunderstorms. This risk was anticipated by the National Weather Service's Storm Prediction Center (SPC), and its local forecast office in Norman, Oklahoma. The Storm Prediction Center's outlooks for severe weather culminated in a "high risk" area being delineated over the Great Plains for May 24. Issued at 11:25 a.m. CDT, the Storm Prediction Center's convective outlook for the day highlighted the tornado risk, which included central Oklahoma inside a large region with a 45% chance of a tornado touchdown within 25 miles (40 km) of any given point, and a 10% or greater chance of a significant (EF2+) tornado within that same 25 miles (40 km) radius.

At 12:50 p.m., the Storm Prediction Center issued a Particularly Dangerous Situation (PDS) tornado watch, to remain in effect until 10:00 p.m., for most of central Oklahoma extending from the state border with Kansas down through the Oklahoma City metropolitan area and into northern Texas. The text of the tornado watch again warned of the possible development of "destructive tornadoes... ...some of which could be long-tracked and strong to violent."

== Tornado summary ==
=== Grady County ===
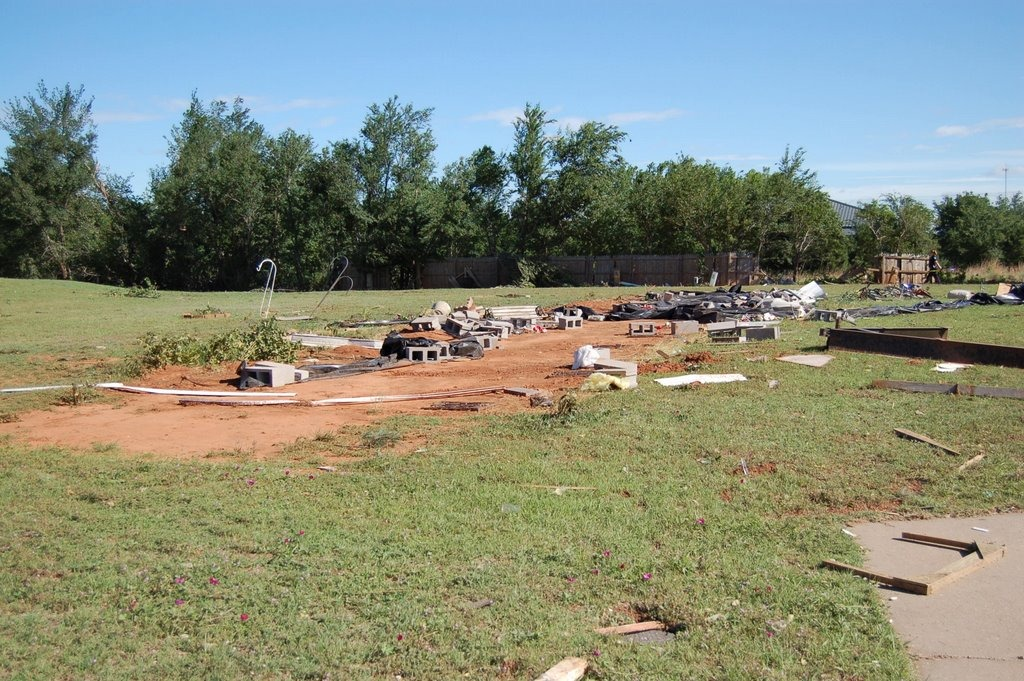
A mobile home that got destroyed at EF2 intensity

At 5:06 p.m., an uncondensed tornado touched down on Fieldcrest Dr in a neighborhood south of Chickasha at EF0 strength, taking tree limbs off and blowing down fences; some homes sustained minor roof damage. The tornado crossed H. E. Bailey Turnpike where large branches and television aerials were ripped away. The tornado strengthened to EF1 intensity as it crossed Sleepy Hollow Blvd, some large trees were uprooted and minimal roof damage was noted, multiple trees were uprooted, and one of them fell onto a home. The tornado rapidly intensified to high-end EF2 strength with wind speeds of 135 mph (217 km/h), a manufactured home along Parkway Dr was demolished, and debris was blown away. A 24-year-old woman was killed in this area as her mobile home was lifted and dropped on top of her. The tornado weakened to mid-range EF2 intensity, a car wash and repair shop on W Country Club Road had their roof ripped away at 120 mph, a gas station nearby had piece of their roof ripped off, trees were also uprooted and an outbuilding was damaged. The tornado weakened to high-end EF1 strength, uprooting multiple trees and damaging an apartment complex along Glenwood Dr. The tornado crossed E Almar Dr where it re-intensified to mid-range EF2, a roof of an apartment complex was torn off and suffered partial wall collapse, a car was flipped and damaged, around the same time, the funnel of the tornado fully condensed to the ground. A Dollar Tree suffered severe damage as some of the exterior walls collapsed. Still, due to the contextual damage not matching up with the structural damage of the building, it only retained mid-range EF2 intensity. The Dollar Tree was later reopened in 2012.

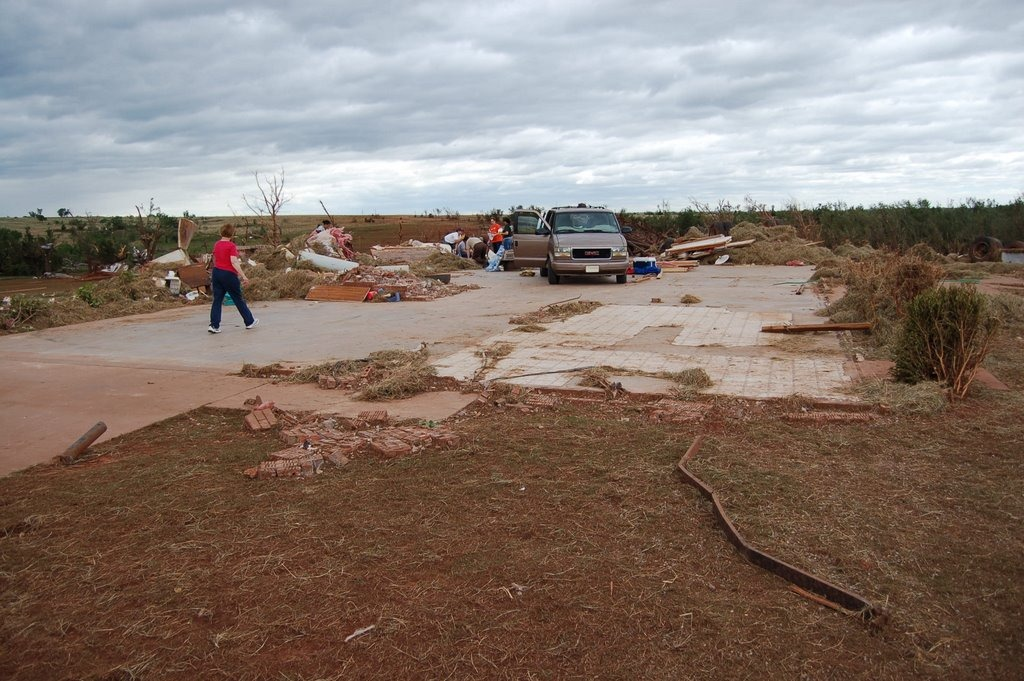
Well-built home near Chickasha completely swept away

The tornado left the neighborhoods, passing by a mesonet station to the south and east; the station recorded a gust of 53 mph (85 km/h) and a pressure drop. The tornado crossed D2855 Road, weakening to low-end EF2 intensity, destroying a barn and uprooting multiple trees before it crossed the Washita River. More trees were uprooted on E1365 Road, along with a metal fence at EF1 strength. The tornado intensified to low-end EF2 after crossing I-62, where another barn was demolished and multiple trees were uprooted. The tornado continued to travel to the northeast before explosively intensifying to low-end EF4 strength; a well-constructed home on E1350 Road has swept away at an estimated wind speed of 170 mph (270 km/h), a home right across the road was leveled and ground scouring was noted in this location, the garage of the home was blown down, and three cars were tossed 300 to 750 ft away northeast, a mobile home was completely obliterated around here, other homes near the vicinity lost their exterior walls, and two metal building was completely demolished. The tornado weakened to low-end EF3 intensity, multiple hardwood trees were debarked and lost their branches, and two framed homes on Maple Road lost their roofs, a couple of mobile homes were destroyed, a barn was leveled further north. The tornado crossed Miller Road where it re-intensified to low-end EF4 intensity, a well-constructed home was almost leveled, leaving a few interior walls standing, two other framed homes nearby had its roof ripped away, and a mobile home was separated from its unit and was rolled off, badly damaging it, crops, mud, and straw were scoured and was piled up against a fence up to 6 ft high and a car was tossed at an unknown distance. A home on Smith Rd lost its exterior walls, and a masonry home further north sustained substantial roof damage. Some trees were uprooted, and power lines leaned over.

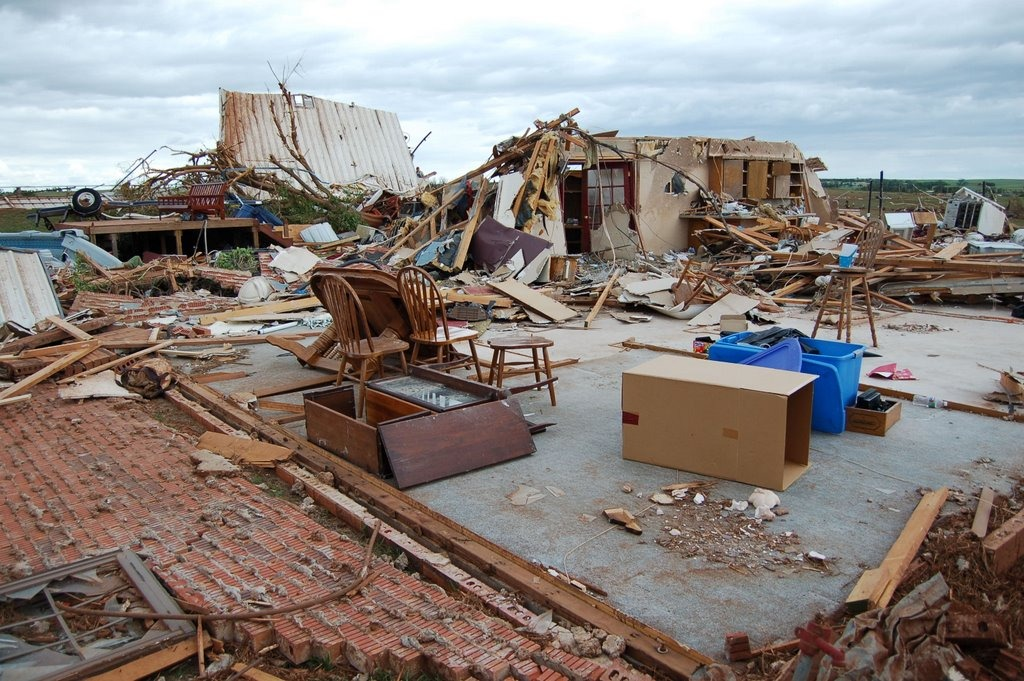
Low-end EF4 damage to a home near Chickasha

The tornado maintained EF4 strength as it crossed Ballard Road. A brick home along this road was leveled at wind speeds of 170 mph (270 km/h), the brick chimney of the home was crumpled, and trees were debarked and uprooted. The tornado weakened to EF3 intensity, a stone home had its roof torn off, the ground was scoured away, vehicles were thrown 300 yards away and mangled and trees were debarked. The tornado maintained EF3 intensity as it crossed County Street 2920; numerous trees around East Bitter Creek were debarked, the ground was completely scoured away down to the dirt, and an outbuilding was leveled near the edge of the path. The tornado weakened to EF1 strength and shrunk in size as it crossed E1300 Road, snapping and uprooting trees and ripping a roof off an outbuilding. Homes sustained minor roof damage. Despite being far from the tornado, a single-wide manufactured home along E1295 Road sustained severe damage, likely caused by rear flank downdraft winds.

Passing west of Blanchard, the tornado re-strengthened to low-end EF3 intensity, crossing NW 25th Street, trees were debarked, and an entire home was shifted off its foundation, and a mobile home was completely demolished, a two-story home had their second floor lost their exterior walls and an outbuilding was demolished. The tornado crossed County Street 2980, slightly intensifying to mid-range EF3 strength as a double-wide mobile home was obliterated, and ground scouring was noted to happen again, a farmstead along the road suffered major damage as it was almost leveled, leaving a few interior walls standing, a pickup truck was thrown 200 yards (180 m) away and was destroyed as it was stripped down to its chassis, other vehicles were thrown and mangled. The tornado weakened to high-end EF2 intensity, snapping and uprooting multiple trees and destroying the exterior walls of a home on County Road 2984 before entering McClain County; the tornado killed one person and injured 48 people although the total damages are unknown.

=== McClain County ===
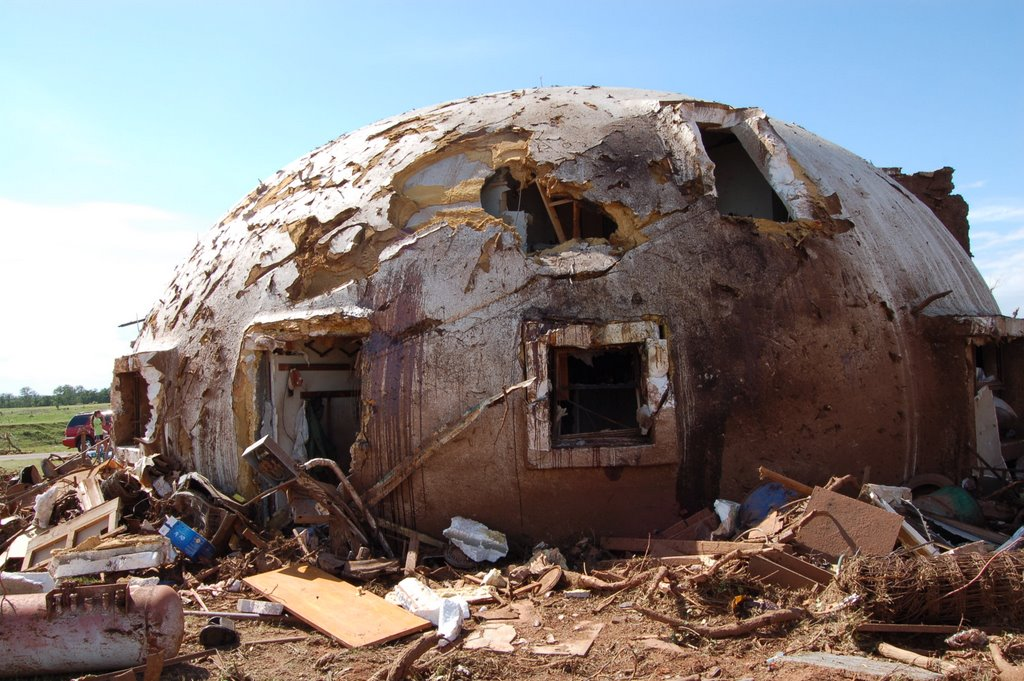
Reinforced concrete dome home sustaining significant damage

The tornado entered McClain County and first crossed into a neighborhood north of Blanchard, where it intensified to mid-range EF3 strength, destroying a home and leaving a few interior walls standing and ripping roofs off of homes along N County Line Ave, as well as destroying a mobile home. The tornado rapidly strengthened to high-end EF4 intensity; the tornado crossed Maple Ridge Road, where a thin shell concrete dome was damaged, and since the home was reinforced with steel fibers rather than the common horizontal and vertical rebar, the dome was severely cracked by flying debris, all the windows were blown out, and the doors caved in, two vehicles were destroyed, and trees nearby were debarked, 10"x30" of asphalt was ripped away.

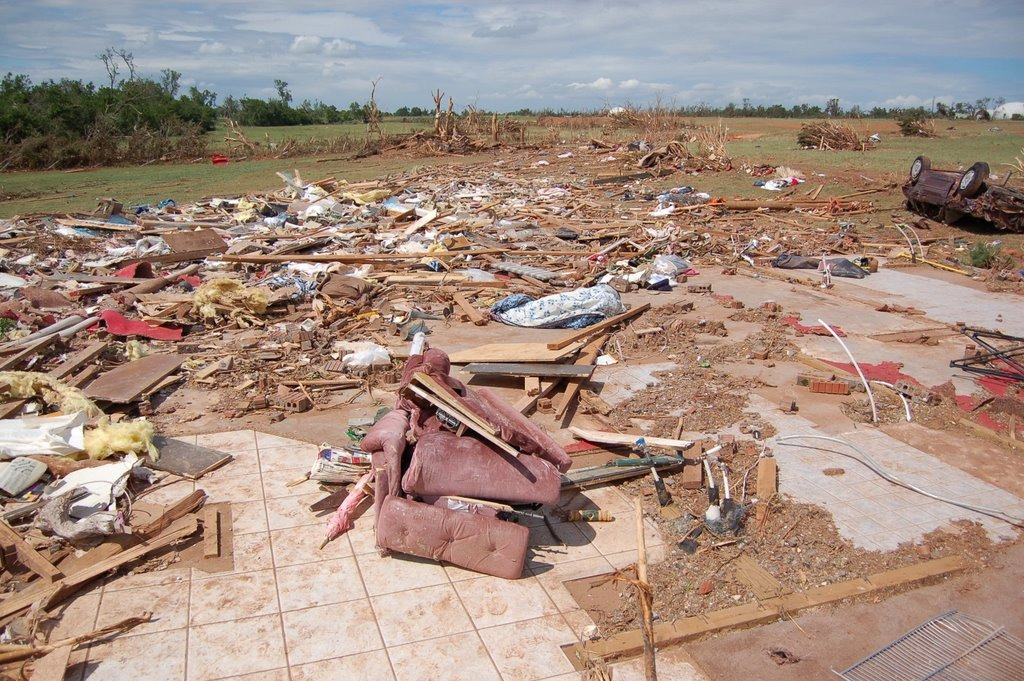
Well-constructed home north of Blanchard on Kitty Hawk Road partially swept away at 190 mph (310 km/h) being possible EF5 damage.

The tornado crossed Kitty Hawk Road, where it rapidly strengthened to extremely high-end EF4 intensity with estimated wind speeds of nearly 200 mph, and the most violent damage from the tornado occurred around here. 10'x100' of asphalt was stripped off by the tornado, numerous trees were blown down and severely debarked and the ground was scoured and went as deep as 2-4", some part of the pavement were gouged out by flying debris. A well-built brick veneer home on Kitty Hawk Road was swept away, but it was possibly EF5 level damage as it had anchor bolted sill plates, and some of them remained intact, and the south side of the home was mud blasted, but due to the fact some of the anchor bolts were missing their washers, the damage here was rated 185 mph (298 km/h). Another home on the intersection of Kitty Hawk Road and Meadow Lark Ln has been swept away and also possibly had EF5 level damage; it was anchored with a mix of anchored with anchor bolts and cut nails, and the sill plates that remained on the foundation had straight nail studs, and some furniture on the foundation were unaffected, leaving the home to get a rating of 180 mph (290 km/h). On Meadow Lark Ln, another well-built home was leveled and partially swept away and was another EF5 candidate; trees nearby were shredded down to their stubs, several inches of soil around the home was scoured and vehicles were tossed 300–600 yards (270–550 m) away, but the home was given a rating of 190 mph (310 km/h) due to some of the anchor bolts missing nuts and some of the sill plates were attached with cut nails and the remaining sill plates had straight nail studs left, preventing a higher rating.

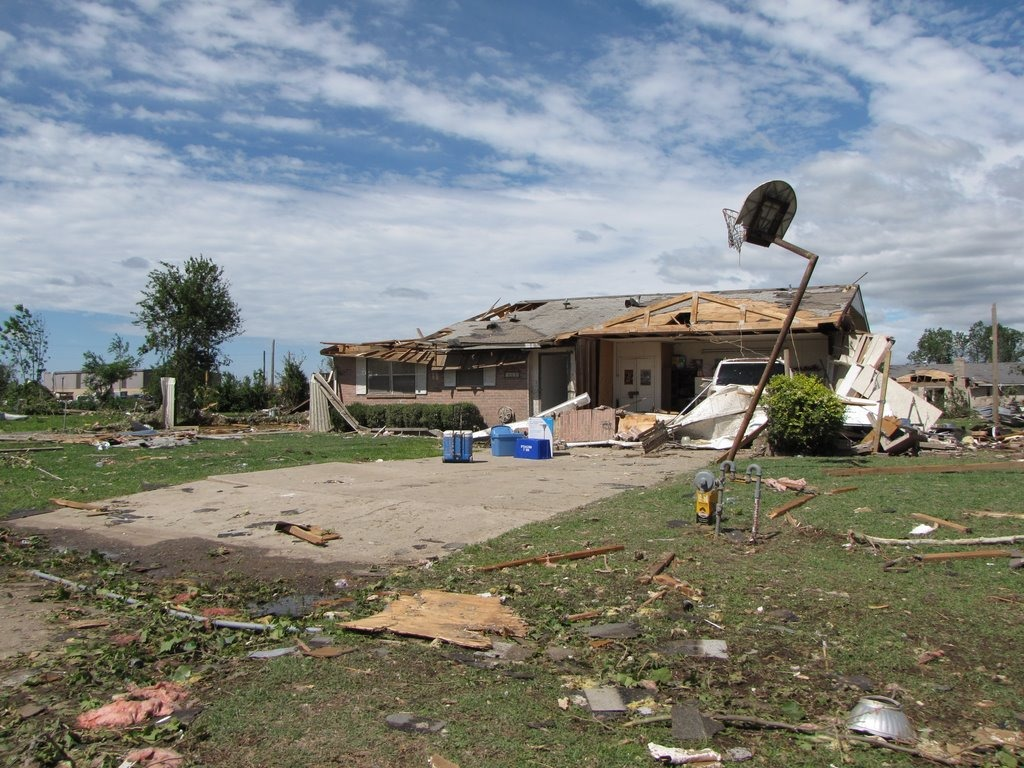
Significant roof damage north of Newcastle

The tornado crossed H.E. Bailey Turnpike Norman Spur, leveling a home at low-end EF4 intensity; homes nearby were mostly destroyed, leaving a few interior walls standing. The tornado substantially weakened to high-end EF2, destroying a barn and tearing away many roofs off of homes along W Golf Course Road, a home on S Ross Dr lost its exterior walls, and a power pole on S Rockwell Road was snapped. The tornado weakened to an EF1, ripping a roof off a mobile home on Timber Ridge Drive and leveling an outbuilding. Multiple softwood and hardwood trees were snapped or uprooted along SW 16th St and Quail Run Road. The tornado passed west of downtown Newcastle, re-intensifying to mid-range EF2 strength as the Senior Living Apartments on W Fox Ln sustained significant roof damage, and more trees were snapped on this road. A subdivision took a direct hit from the tornado at 122 mph (196 km/h), many homes sustained severe roof damage, and many outbuildings were destroyed. Some metal buildings along N Meridian Avenue received minor damage to their roof and walls. The tornado weakened to EF0, causing minimal roof damage to a home on NE 23rd Street; the tornado continued to cause moderate damage, snapping trees and power poles before crossing the Canadian River into Cleveland County, the tornado caused minor damage to a warehouse and an outbuilding along on SW 149th Street before dissipating southwest of Moore. Despite the extensive damage, no injuries and fatalities were reported in McClain County, and no casualties were reported in Cleveland County.

== Aftermath ==
After the tornado, the Grady County Sheriff requested assistance from Stephen Sheriff County and five other deputies to come to Chickasha to help in aid. In Grady County, 261 structures were impacted by the tornado, 72 homes and businesses were destroyed by the tornado, 46 other structures received major damage and 143 structures only sustained minor damage.

One fatality resulted from the tornado: 24-year-old Laron Short, a 2010 graduate from the University of Science and Arts of Oklahoma (USAO) with a degree in communication. At the time of the tornado, Short was visiting her grandmother in the Watson Mobile Home Park, located near the intersection of South 4th Street and West Country Club Road in Chickasha. Laron Short, along with her mother, Tammy, and her mother's partner, sought shelter in a shed. As Laron Short was exiting the trailer, it fell on top of her, crushing her. The other two occupants escaped with minor injuries. Reports indicate that the toppled trailer was not properly strapped to the ground.

G.G. Music, Jr., who served as the Incident Commander for the mobile home park in the aftermath of the tornado, reported that the response to the tornado was a "joint effort between the police station and the fire department", unified under a shared goal. Oklahoma Governor Mary Fallin and Chickasha Mayor Hank Ross were seen surveying the damage at the Watson Mobile Home Park site. Several church institutions and individuals brought food, water, and other supplies to assist with the recovery effort.

=== Possible EF5 intensity ===
On January 23, 2025, Anthony W. Lyza with the National Severe Storms Laboratory along with Harold E. Brooks and Makenzie J. Kroca with the University of Oklahoma’s School of Meteorology published a paper to the American Meteorological Society, where they stated the tornado in Chickasha was an "EF5 candidate" and opined that the EF5 starting wind speed should be 190 mph (310 km/h) instead of 201 mph (323 km/h). The National Weather Service office in Norman, Oklahoma surveyed the damage produced by the Chickasha–Blanchard tornado and assigned the damage a maximum wind speed estimate of 200 mph (320 km/h). It was mentioned by surveyors that multiple frame homes, particularly near the Norman Spur of the H.E. Bailey Turnpike, were originally "EF5 candidates", though they were downgraded due to deficiencies in engineering and construction practices.

== See also ==
- Tornadoes of 2011
- Tornado outbreak sequence of May 21–26, 2011
- List of F4 and EF4 tornadoes (2010–2019)
- 2011 Washington–Goldsby tornado — Another EF4 tornado that occurred earlier that same day near the area.
- 2011 El Reno–Piedmont tornado — A long-track and extremely violent EF5 tornado that occurred further north in Oklahoma the same day.
- 2013 Moore tornado — A devastating EF5 tornado that impacting similar areas in Newcastle before moving towards the Oklahoma City suburb of Moore
