= Tornado outbreak sequence of May 21–26, 2011 =

United States meteorological event

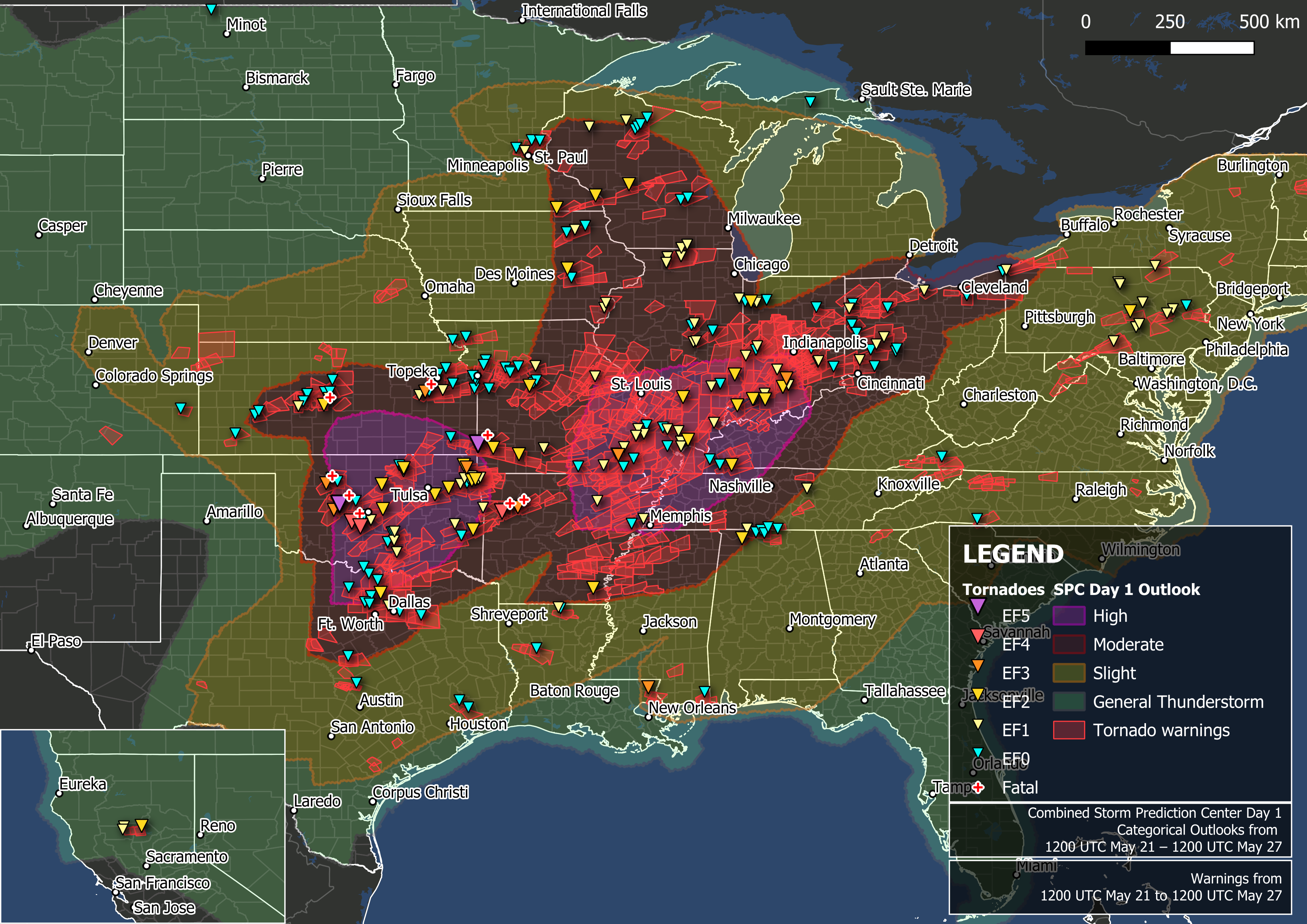
- Map of tornado warnings and confirmed tornadoes during the outbreak sequence (from May 21–26)

Meteorological history
- Duration: May 21–26, 2011

Tornado outbreak
- Tornadoes: 239
- Max. rating: EF5 tornado
- Duration: 5 days, 4 hours, 30 minutes
- Highest winds: Tornadic – >210 mph (340 km/h)*; EF5 near El Reno, Oklahoma, on May 24 *(Wind gusts up to 295 mph (475 km/h) were measured via RaXPol Mobile Radar).
- Highest gusts: Non-tornadic – 100 mph (160 km/h) gusts at two locations on May 25

Overall effects
- Fatalities: 178 fatalities (+8 non-tornadic)
- Injuries: ~1,630 injuries
- Damage: ~$7 billion (2011 USD)
- Areas affected: Midwestern United States, Southern United States
- Part of the tornado outbreaks of 2011

From May 21 to May 26, 2011, several significant and deadly tornado outbreaks affected the Midwestern and Southern regions of the United States. A six-day tornado outbreak sequence, most of the tornadoes developed in a corridor from Lake Superior southwest to central Texas, while isolated tornadoes occurred in other areas. An especially destructive EF5 tornado destroyed one-third of Joplin, Missouri, resulting in 158 deaths and over 1,000 injuries. The Joplin tornado was the deadliest in the United States since April 9, 1947, when an intense tornado killed 181 in the Woodward, Oklahoma, area.

Activity began on May 21, when several tornadoes touched down over the Plains. An EF3 tornado heavily damaged the town of Reading, Kansas, where one person was killed, several others were injured, and 20 houses were destroyed. A moderate risk of severe weather was issued for much of the Midwest south to Oklahoma for May 22. The first tornadic supercell that day developed in the mid-afternoon hours over the western Twin Cities with a swath of damage, especially in and around Minneapolis, Minnesota. An intense EF2 tornado also tracked towards Harmony, Minnesota that afternoon and a tornado emergency was issued. Soon afterwards, the Joplin EF5 tornado occurred, the only violent tornado of the day. Late in the afternoon on May 24, when a high risk was issued over Oklahoma, supercells began forming over western Kansas and Oklahoma, as the National Weather Service predicted a dangerous tornado outbreak. As a line of powerful cells began to take shape, trained spotters reported large tornadoes near El Reno, Oklahoma and in rural Grady County, Oklahoma. One of these swept from Binger to Guthrie, destroying many homes and causing at least nine fatalities. This tornado was rated an EF5, the sixth of the year and second of the outbreak sequence. Three other EF4 tornadoes developed among the many other tornadoes that day. Late on May 25, an EF3 tornado hit the city of Bedford, Indiana. U.S. Route 50 was temporarily closed due to heavy debris. On May 26, strong thunderstorms travelled through the Cumberland Valley in South Central Pennsylvania with reports of EF1 tornadoes near Carlisle, Mechanicsburg, and Hershey.

Tornado-related deaths also occurred in Arkansas, Kansas, Minnesota, and Oklahoma. Overall, the tornado outbreak resulted in 186 deaths, 8 of those non-tornadic, making it second only to the 2011 Super Outbreak as the deadliest since 1974. It was the third costliest tornado outbreak in United States history behind that same April 2011 outbreak and another large tornado outbreak in March 2025, with insured damage estimated at $4–7 billion.

== Meteorological synopsis ==
April 2011 was the most active month for tornadoes on record, capped by the 2011 Super Outbreak that killed 324 people in the final week. In contrast, the first three weeks of May were unusually calm, with only a few isolated tornadoes were confirmed. However, this pattern changed abruptly as a strong low-pressure area, associated dry line and cold front tracked eastward.

=== May 21–23 ===
On May 21, a small system of thunderstorms developed in Brown County, Kansas, while another system formed to the southeast of Emporia, Kansas. The Brown County system spawned a brief tornado over Topeka, Kansas, causing minor damage. This system also caused significant damage in Oskaloosa, Kansas, and other communities. Meanwhile, the Emporia system spawned an EF3 tornado that struck Reading, Kansas; one person was killed, several others were injured, and at least 20 houses were destroyed. These two systems developed several other tornadoes throughout the evening.

A moderate risk of severe weather was issued for much of the Midwest, as well as further south to Oklahoma for May 22. The first tornadic supercell developed in the mid-afternoon hours over the western Twin Cities in Minnesota, and caused moderate damage in the Minneapolis area. Shortly thereafter, a severe EF2 tornado crept towards Harmony, Minnesota, prompting the National Weather Service to issue the first tornado emergency of the outbreak. Late that afternoon, a large, intense EF5 multiple-vortex tornado left catastrophic destruction in Joplin, Missouri. Causing 158 fatalities, it was the deadliest single tornado in the U.S. since at least 1947.

Outbreak death toll
State	Total	County	County total
Arkansas	5	Franklin	3
Arkansas	5	Johnson	2
Kansas	3	Lyon	1
Kansas	3	Stafford	2
Minnesota	1	Hennepin	1
Missouri	158	Jasper	158
Oklahoma	11	Canadian	7
Oklahoma	11	Grady	1
Oklahoma	11	Logan	2
Oklahoma	11	Major	1
Totals	178		
Only tornado-related deaths are included

Once again, a moderate risk of severe weather was issued on May 23—this time for the southern Plains and the lower Great Lakes. Forecasts showed that the main threats would be damaging wind and large hail instead of frequent tornadoes; the stationary front lacked the necessary wind shear to sustain the type of tornadic supercells seen on May 22. This prediction came to light, as only scattered, and mostly weak tornadoes were reported throughout the day. However, an EF2 tornado caused significant damage in Tennessee and Kentucky.

=== May 24 ===
On May 24, a high risk of severe weather was issued for parts of south-central Kansas, central and eastern Oklahoma, and extreme north-central Texas; a moderate risk was issued for surrounding areas in those three states plus northwestern Arkansas and southwestern Missouri. Throughout this region, strong to violent tornadoes were considered to be highly probable for three reasons: (1) the stationary front was expected to maintain its position over the region, (2) wind shear was expected to greatly increase, and (3) these elements would be associated with an incoming trough. Late that morning, the tornado threat increased to 45%, a rare occurrence matching the widespread April 27 outbreak. At 12:50 p.m. CDT, the SPC issued a Particularly Dangerous Situation (PDS) tornado watch for parts of central Oklahoma, including Oklahoma City and northern Texas, in effect until 10:00 p.m. CDT. Numerous tornadoes touched down in several regions, with the first activity being in western Oklahoma that afternoon where several very intense tornadoes developed, including another EF5 (the sixth of the year). They did not cause extensive damage in Oklahoma City, but 11 deaths were reported among extensive damage just to the southwest of the OKC metro. Other tornado clusters developed in central Kansas that afternoon and in the Dallas-Fort Worth Metroplex that evening.

=== May 25–26 ===
Once again on May 25, a high risk of severe storms was issued for the middle Mississippi River valley from near Memphis, Tennessee, northward to north of Evansville, Indiana, and was expanded late that morning northward to near Indianapolis, Indiana, northwest to near St. Louis, Missouri, southeast to just west of Nashville, Tennessee, and southwest to near Little Rock, Arkansas. Several hours before the outbreak was expected to begin, a PDS tornado watch was issued for western Kentucky, southern Indiana, the southern half of Illinois and eastern Missouri. The entire state of Indiana, southern Michigan, and most of Missouri were under tornado watches. Widespread tornado activity occurred that day across the central and eastern U.S. An EF3 destroyed many homes in the town of Bedford, Indiana, and an EF2 wedge tornado caused severe damage in Sedalia, Missouri.

Tornado activity continued on May 26, but most were weak. Eight separate EF1 tornadoes touched down across Pennsylvania, and an isolated EF3 tornado destroyed multiple homes near Bush, Louisiana.

== Confirmed tornadoes ==
Confirmed tornadoes by Enhanced Fujita rating
EFU	EF0	EF1	EF2	EF3	EF4	EF5	Total
0	109	86	31	8	3	2	239

=== Reading–Barclay, Kansas ===
Reading–Barclay, Kansas
- A photo taken of the tornado in the distance.

Meteorological history
- Formed: May 21, 2011, 9:10 p.m. CDT (UTC−05:00)
- Dissipated: May 21, 2011, 9:30 p.m. CDT (UTC−05:00)
- Duration: 20 minutes

EF3 tornado
- on the Enhanced Fujita scale
- Highest winds: 140 mph (230 km/h)

Overall effects
- Casualties: 1 fatality, 5 injuries
- Damage: >$2.28 million (2011 USD) (Note: All damage totals are in 2011 USD unless otherwise stated.)

The first strong and deadly tornado of the multi-day outbreak sequence, was this intense and damaging tornado that first touched down at 9:10 p.m. CDT (02:10 UTC) on the evening of May 21, in eastern Lyon County, Kansas. The tornado formed along a rural road, before tracking northeastward. The tornado traveled 3 miles (4.8 km) and intensified before entering the city of Reading, where it inflicted its worst damage.

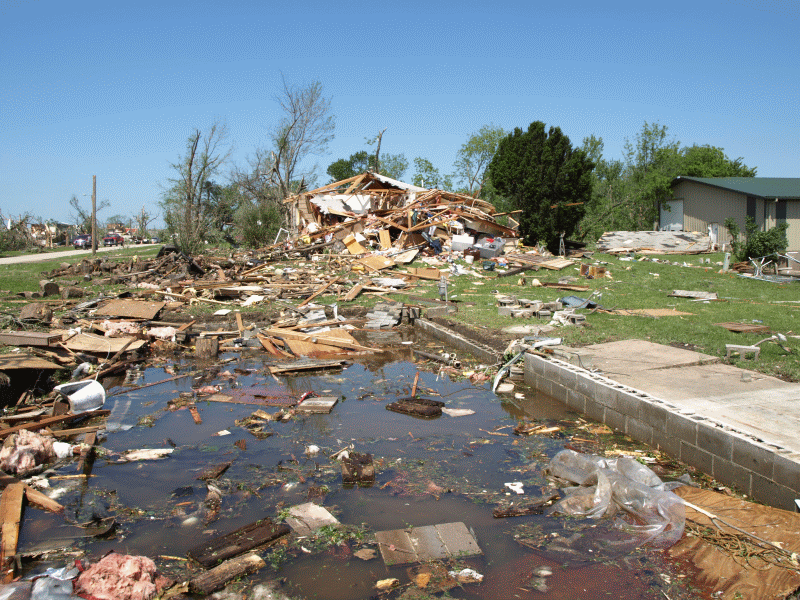
A mobile home in Reading that was completely destroyed, where one person was killed.

The tornado tracked through the western portions of the city, inflicting pockets of EF3 damage, including a single-story home that was demolished and swept clean off its foundation and several two-story homes that had their top stories destroyed. The tornado then struck a well-anchored mobile home, which was lofted 100 yards (91 m) into a nearby tree and completely destroyed. A man was killed at this location, and five others throughout the city suffered injuries. Along the tornado's track through Reading, several vehicles were rolled and a chemical tank was thrown 100 yards (91 m) away from its origin point.

The tornado left city limits at 9:20 p.m. CDT (02:20 UTC) and entered Osage County, where an EF0 satellite tornado was observed and lasted four minutes. The original tornado traveled for 6.98 miles (11.23 km) throughout Osage County, damaging a farmstead at EF1 intensity as it tracked northwest of Melvern Lake. The tornado continued to weaken, inflicting scattered and insignificant tree damage before dissipating at 9:30 p.m. CDT (02:30 UTC), 2.25 miles (3.62 km) east of Barclay. The tornado tracked for 10.11 miles (16.27 km) and reached a max width of 700 yards (640 m).

=== Joplin–Duquesne–Diamond, Missouri ===
Joplin–Duquesne–Diamond, Missouri
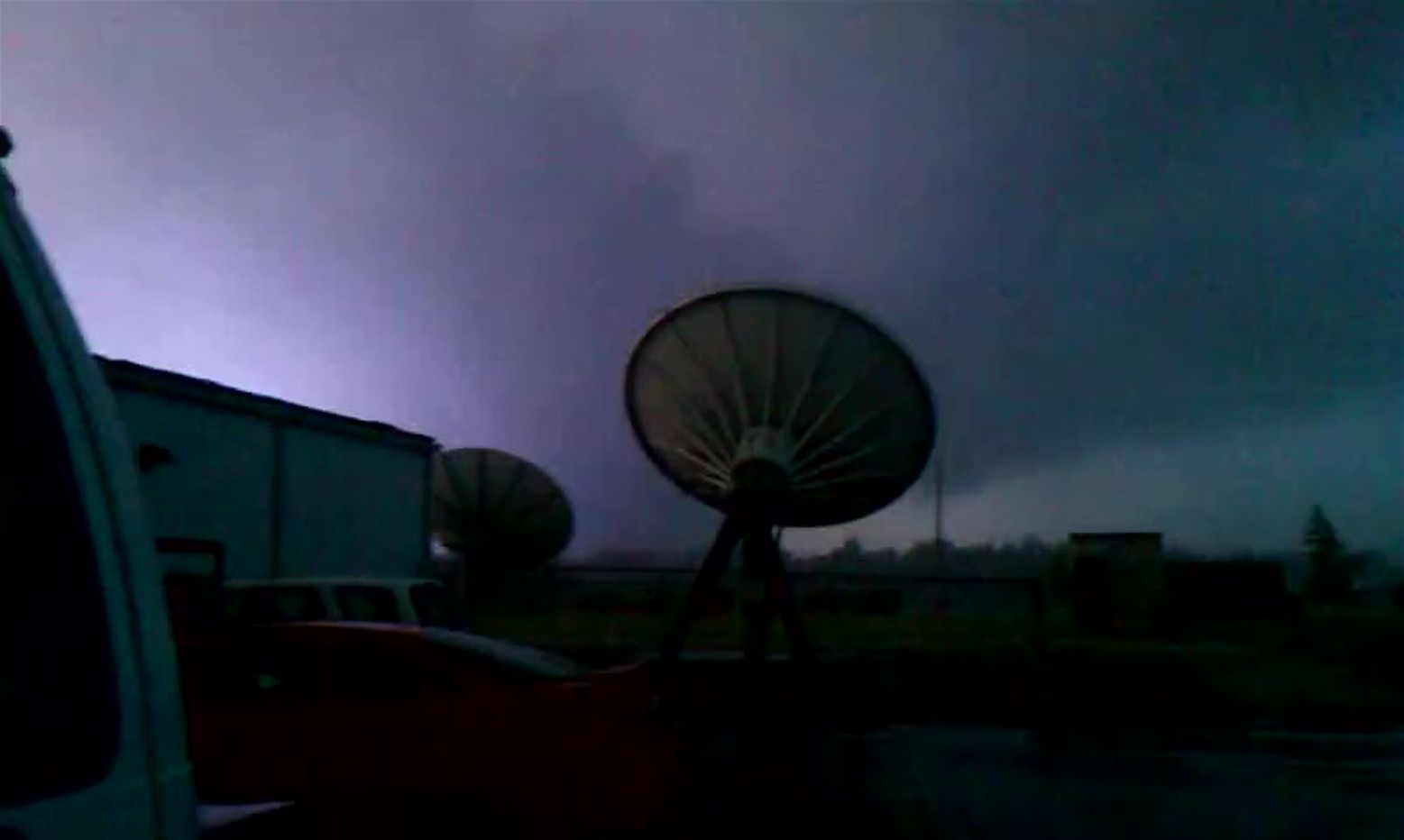
- The tornado being illuminated by a power flash as it was tracking into Joplin.

Meteorological history
- Formed: May 22, 2011, 5:34 p.m. CDT (UTC−05:00)
- Dissipated: May 22, 2011, 6:20 p.m. CDT (UTC–05:00)
- Duration: 46 minutes

EF5 tornado
- on the Enhanced Fujita scale
- Highest winds: >200 mph (320 km/h)

Overall effects
- Casualties: 158 fatalities (+8 indirect), 1,150 injuries
- Damage: $2.8 billion (2011 USD)

This large, deadly and extremely impactful EF5 tornado tracked through Joplin, Missouri, leaving behind catastrophic damage. The tornado was multiple-vortex in nature and was up to one mile (1.6 km) wide. Mainly the southern part of the city was affected, with most structures in the area either damaged or destroyed. 158 people were directly killed by the tornado, with at least eight more indirect fatalities, making it the deadliest United States tornado since 1947 and one of the deadliest single tornadoes ever recorded.

The tornado first touched down in Newton County, Missouri, just east of the Missouri–Kansas state line at 5:34 p.m. CDT (22:34 UTC) on May 22, initially knocking down large trees. The tornado moved east-northeast and strengthened to EF1 intensity as it continued through rural areas towards Joplin, snapping trees and power poles and damaging outbuildings. Widening, the tornado then tracked into the more densely populated southwest corner of the city near the Twin Hills Country Club. It heavily damaged several homes at a subdivision in this area at up to EF3 strength. The tornado continued to cause EF3 damage as it moved through another subdivision just east of Iron Gates Road. Numerous homes were destroyed and multiple vehicles tossed around, some of which were thrown onto or rolled into homes. The tornado reached EF4 intensity just before crossing S. Schifferdecker Avenue.

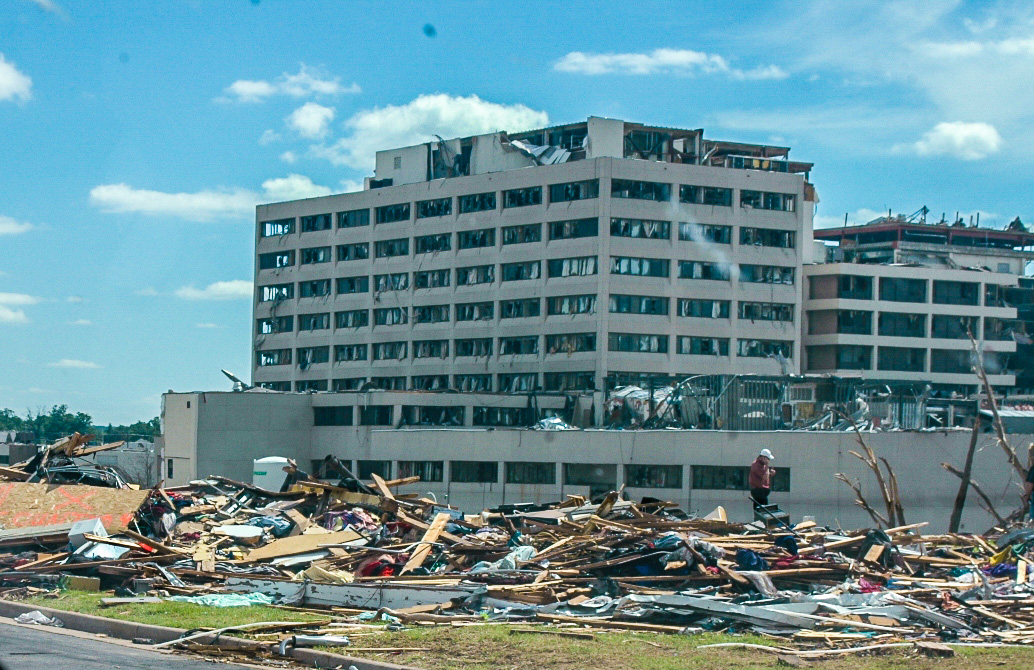
EF5 damage to St. John's Regional Medical Center in Joplin, which later had to be torn down due to deformation of its foundation and underpinning system.

The tornado began producing EF4 damage only four minutes after touching down, as several small but well-built commercial buildings were flattened. Consistent EF4 to EF5 damage was noted east of S. Schifferdecker Avenue and continued through most of southern Joplin. Numerous homes, businesses, and medical buildings were flattened in this area, with concrete walls collapsed and crushed into the foundations. A large steel-reinforced step and floor structure leading to a completely destroyed medical building was "deflected upward several inches and cracked". Steel trusses were deformed, vehicles were thrown and mangled, and several 300-pound concrete parking stops anchored with rebar were torn from a parking lot in this area and thrown up to 60 yards (55 m) away.

Widespread, catastrophic damage occurred around the St. John's Regional Medical Center, which itself lost nearly every window on three sides, interior walls, ceilings, and part of its roof. The hospital's life flight helicopter was also blown away and destroyed. The building was later torn down due to the severity of the structural damage.

Wind-rowing of debris was noted in this area, more concrete parking stops were removed from the St. John's parking lot, and virtually every house near McClelland Boulevard and 26th Street was flattened. Some homes were swept completely away, and trees sustained severe debarking. The tornado maintained EF5 intensity as it moved to the east, either heavily damaging or completely destroying nearly every structure directly in its path, including several larger institutional buildings. Entire neighborhoods were leveled, trees were stripped completely of their bark, vehicles were tossed up to several blocks. A large church, a nursing home, Franklin Technology Center, St. Mary's Catholic Church and School, and Joplin High School were all destroyed, and the Greenbriar Nursing Home was completely leveled, with 21 fatalities. Several large apartment buildings, a Dillons grocery store, and a bank were destroyed near Connecticut Avenue. Along Rangeline Road, a large commercial district was impacted, where a Walmart and a Home Depot were completely destroyed, along with numerous other businesses and restaurants. The manager of the Pizza Hut was sucked out of the freezer and killed, although others survived inside.

High-end damage continued around Duquesne Road in southeast Joplin, where many houses and industrial and commercial buildings were flattened. Large metal warehouse structures were swept cleanly from their foundations, and heavy industrial vehicles were thrown up to 400 yards (370 m). A Cummins warehouse, a concrete block and steel building, was destroyed, and a nearby Fastrip gas station and convenience store was completely destroyed as the last area of EF5 damage was noted. Many homes were destroyed in a nearby subdivision at EF3–EF4 intensity, and East Middle School sustained major damage. The tornado continued on an east to east-southeast trajectory towards I-44 where it weakened. EF2–EF3 damage occurred near US 71 (exit 11; now the I-49 interchange). The weakening tornado continued to track into the rural areas of southeastern Jasper County and northeastern Newton County where damage was generally minor to moderate, with trees, mobile homes, outbuildings, and frame homes damaged mainly at EF0 to EF1 strength. The tornado lifted east of Diamond at 6:20 p.m. CDT (23:20 UTC), according to aerial surveys. The damage path was 22.1 miles (35.6 km) long through Jasper and Newton counties. In addition to 158 deaths, over 1,150 others were injured along the path. A separate EF2 tornado touched down near Wentworth from the same supercell about 25 miles (40 km) east-southeast of Joplin, beginning roughly ten minutes before the dissipation of this tornado. Damage was estimated at $2.8 billion (2011 USD).

=== Zena, Oklahoma/Southwest City, Missouri ===
Zena, Oklahoma/Southwest City, Missouri
- The tornado near Southwest City.

Meteorological history
- Formed: May 22, 2011, 6:52 p.m. CDT (UTC–05:00)
- Dissipated: May 22, 2011, 7:36 p.m. CDT (UTC–05:00)
- Duration: 44 minutes

EF3 tornado
- on the Enhanced Fujita scale
- Highest winds: 155 mph (249 km/h)

Overall effects
- Casualties: 4 injuries
- Damage: $2 million (2011 USD)

This large and very intense tornado first touched down at 6:52 p.m. CDT (23:52 UTC) in Delaware County, Oklahoma, around 2.5 miles (4.0 km) west-southwest of Zena, near the city of Grove. The tornado tracked east-northeastward across Grand Lake and south of Zena, crossing US 59 just north of the US 59/OK 127 intersection. In this area, a home suffered significant damage and was partially shifted off its foundation, and numerous large hardwood trees were snapped. The tornado began to intensify and expand just to the east of US 59, where several single-family homes suffered extensive damage. The tornado crossed South 640 Road as it uprooted, snapped, and damaged numerous hardwood trees and destroyed various power poles. The tornado continued northeastward before striking and severely damaging a home along the eastern side of South 690 Road. Two nearby barns were completely destroyed, and widespread tree damage was present in the area.

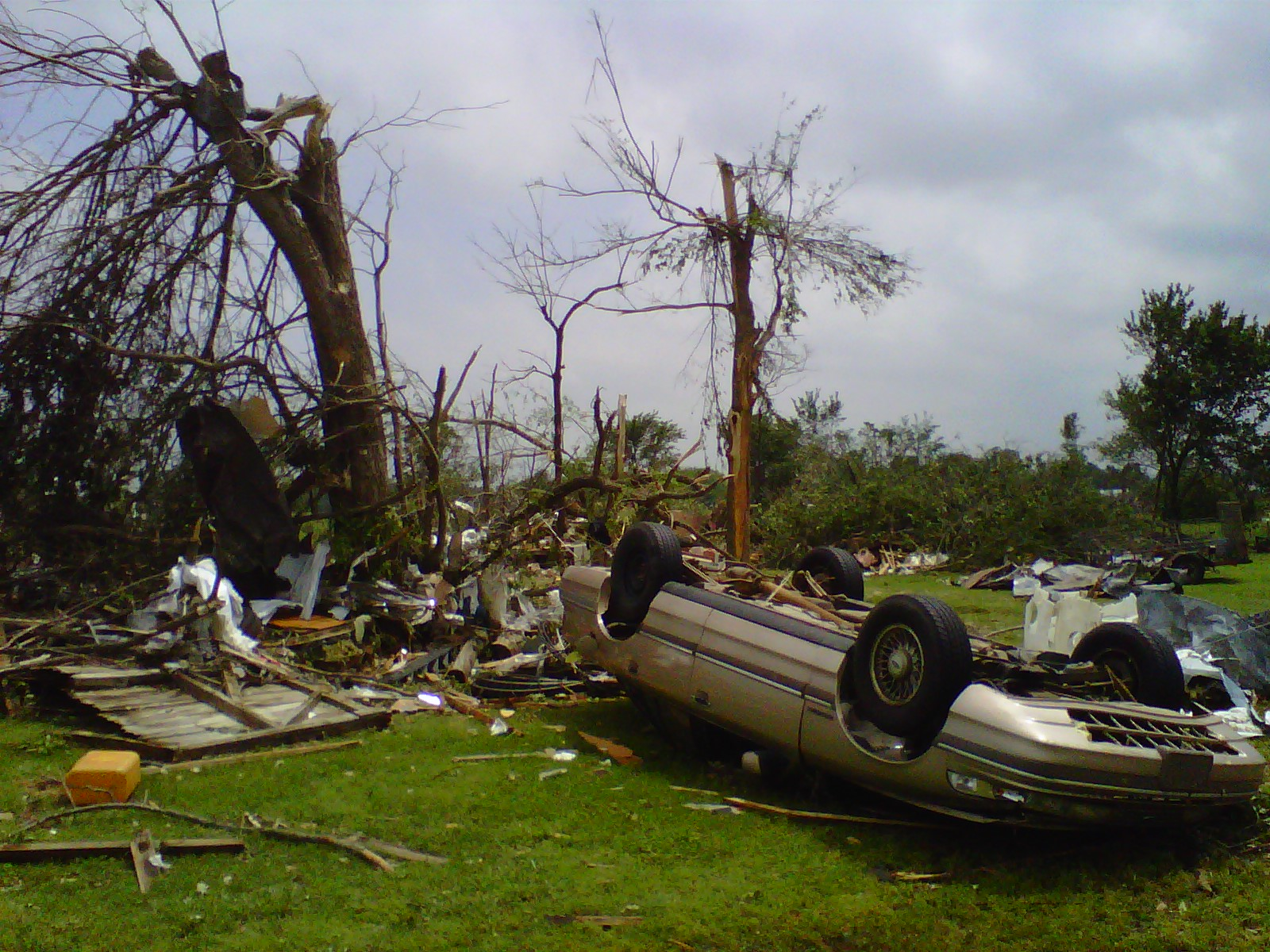
Severe damage near Dodge, Oklahoma.

The tornado then intensified to low-end EF3 intensity as it crossed D0331 Road, where a double-wide mobile home was completely destroyed, with the frame being thrown 200 yards (180 m). Several barns were demolished, with the debris of the barns and mobile home being granulated to small fragments. Nearby trees were snapped, debarked, and had only stubs of the largest branches remaining. The tornado crossed South 692 Road, obliterating another mobile home, with nearby hardwood trees being snapped and partially debarked. The tornado then struck several homes and buildings on the eastern side of Blecha Road at high-end EF2 strength, right before the state line. In this area, two mobile homes were completely destroyed and several vehicles were flipped and rolled up to 25 yards (23 m) away. A single-family home had several exterior walls collapse, with two people being injured inside, and a nearby steel-frame building was destroyed.

The tornado entered McDonald County, Missouri, at 7:26 p.m. CDT (00:26 UTC), crossing Stateline Road around 2.8 miles (4.5 km) north of Southwest City. The tornado struck and destroyed a single-family home, with nearby vehicles being up to rolled 200 yards (180 m) away from their origin point. The estimated wind speeds at this location were 150–160 mph (240–260 km/h). The tornado continued southeastward, uprooting various trees as it tracked towards chicken houses near the MO 43/Farm Road 4385 intersection. The tornado dissipated at 7:36 p.m. CDT (00:36 UTC) right before reaching MO 43 approximately 2.2 miles (3.5 km) north of Southwest City. The tornado tracked for 17.93 miles (28.86 km), reached a maximum width of 1,550 yards (1,420 m), and injured four people and inflicted $2 million (2011 USD) in damages along its track.

=== Canton Lake–Longdale–Fairview, Oklahoma ===
Canton Lake–Longdale–Fairview, Oklahoma
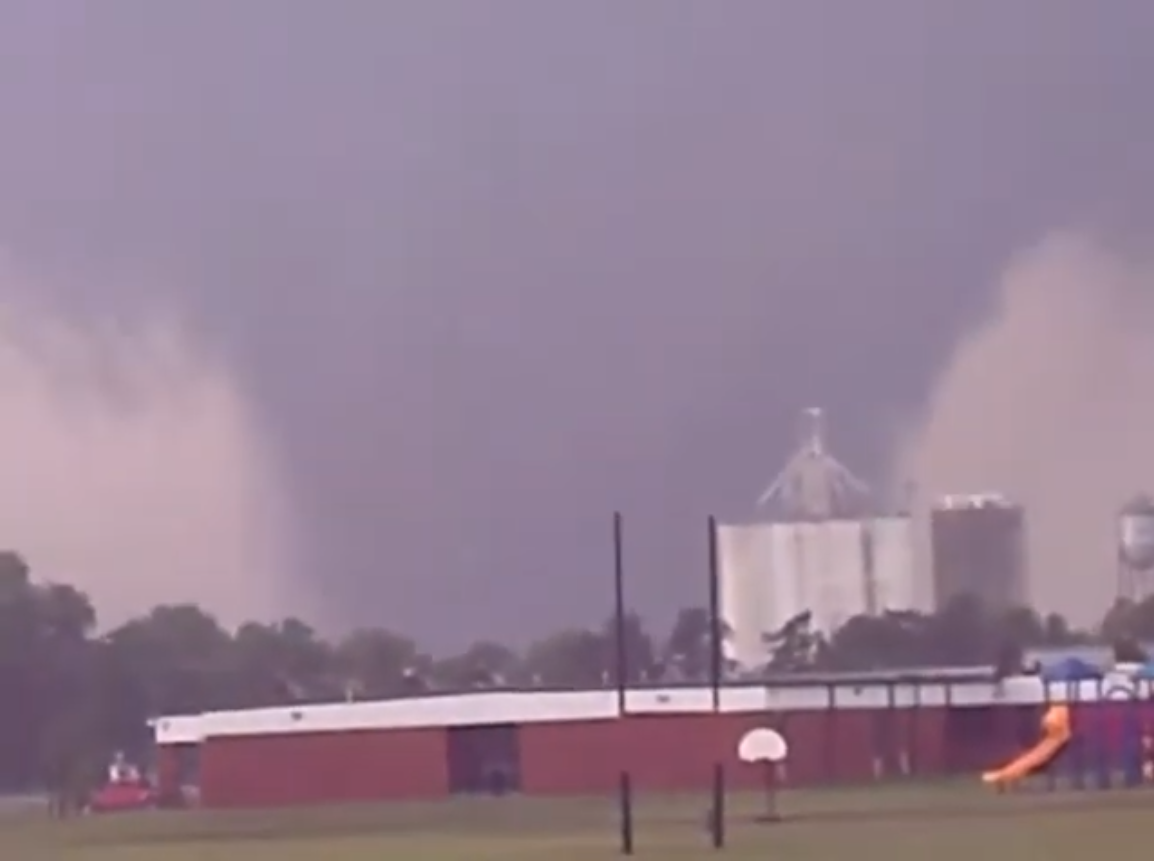
- The tornado seen around Canton Lake.

Meteorological history
- Formed: May 24, 2011, 3:20 p.m. CDT (UTC-05:00)
- Dissipated: May 24, 2011, 3:43 p.m. CDT (UTC-05:00)
- Duration: 23 minutes

EF3 tornado
- on the Enhanced Fujita scale
- Highest winds: 165 mph (266 km/h)

Overall effects
- Casualties: 1 fatality, 2 injuries

This was the first major tornado in Oklahoma on May 24. The tornado first began west of the town of Canton, in Dewey County. It moved in a north-northeast direction, quickly causing significant damage to trees and power lines. The tornado would continue tracking towards the northeast into Blaine County, and would to move towards Canton Lake, where multiple trailer homes would end up knocked over or destroyed. Two Injuries were reported at the Canadian Campground.

Several campers had rushed to take shelter inside a concrete bathhouse. The tornado then struck and inflicted damage to the bathhouse. No injuries or fatalities were reported as it sustained a direct hit. Benches and pick-nick tables in the area were knocked over or shattered. The tornado would continue to track through Canton Lake, eventually approaching areas southwest of Longdale, and would rapidly approach many more trees and structures. Major surges of water would also cause extreme flooding to communities and campgrounds near Canton Lake due to the tornadoes strike over water. The tornado would continue to track, now moving towards the north into Major County, and would cause extreme damage to multiple homesteads, and barns. Trees in this area were splintered, and power poles were also severely damaged. The tornado would hit a farmstead, and cause the entire building to collapse. Trees in this area would continue to sustain intense damage, with many of them being debarked and snapped. The Tornado would continue north, and would damage the roof of a church, and continue causing major damage to mobile homes near Cedar Springs, before dissipating southwest of Fairview.

=== El Reno–Piedmont–Guthrie, Oklahoma ===
El Reno–Piedmont–Guthrie, Oklahoma
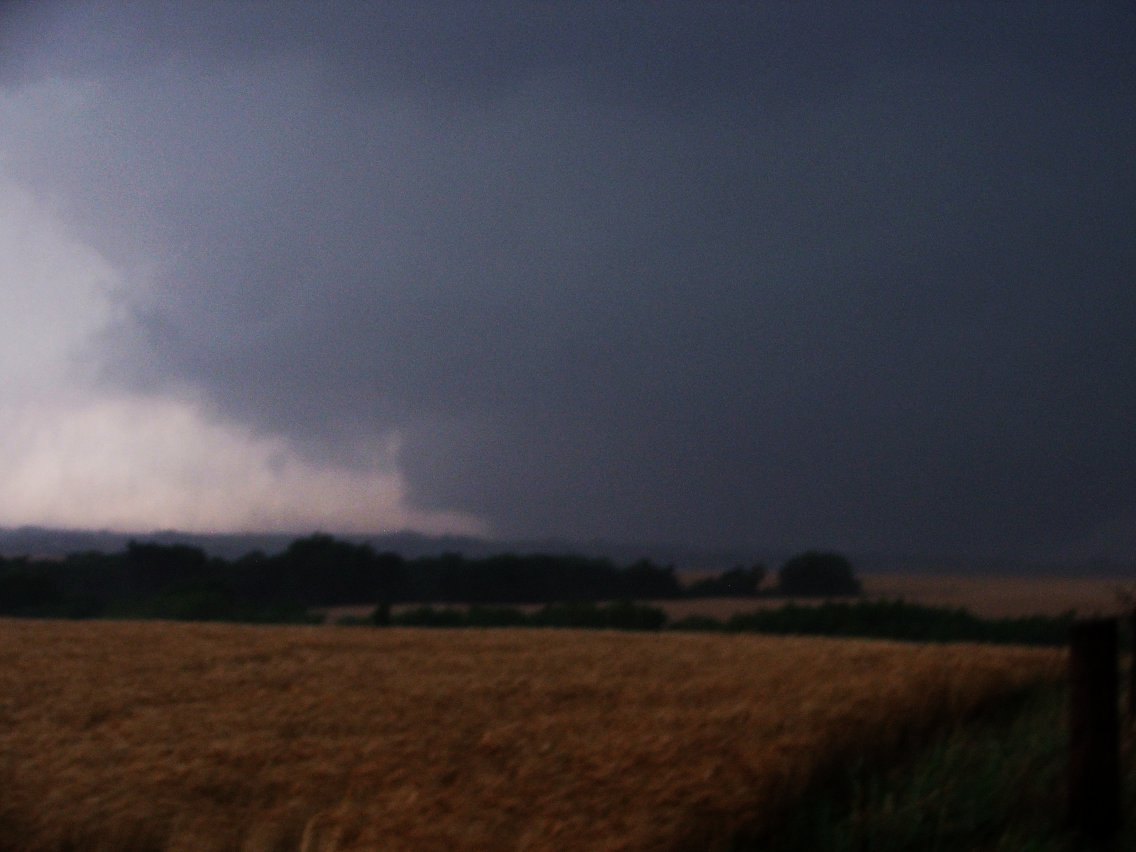
- The tornado at peak intensity near El Reno, Oklahoma

Meteorological history
- Formed: May 24, 2011, 3:50 p.m. CDT (UTC−05:00)
- Dissipated: May 24, 2011, 5:35 p.m. CDT (UTC–05:00)
- Duration: 1 hour, 45 minutes

EF5 tornado
- on the Enhanced Fujita scale
- Highest winds: >210 mph (340 km/h)*; *Wind gusts up to 295 mph (475 km/h) were measured via RaXPol Mobile Radar)

Overall effects
- Casualties: 9 fatalities, 181 injuries

This long-tracked and powerful multiple-vortex tornado touched down east-southeast Hinton, Oklahoma during the afternoon hours of May 24, producing extreme damage in rural portions of Canadian County, Kingfisher, and Logan Counties. Nine people were killed and 181 others were injured along a 63.1-mile (101.5 km) long path.

Shortly after an EF3 tornado in Caddo County dissipated, the tornado began in southwestern Canadian County and quickly became violent, debarking numerous trees as it passed through areas several miles southwest of Calumet. As it approached and crossed I-40 west of El Reno, it reached its maximum intensity. Three people were killed as two vehicles were tossed more than 1,093 yards (999 m) from the road and obliterated, the victims being found stripped of clothing 1/4 mile (0.40 km) from the interstate and left "unrecognizable". Only pieces of the vehicle's frames were reportedly recovered. A nearby 20,000-pound (9,100 kg) oil tanker truck that was parked at an oil production site near the interstate was thrown approximately one mile (1.6 km) into a wooded gully.

Several homes were swept completely away along I-40, trees were completely debarked, and the ground was heavily scoured in some areas. At the nearby Cactus-117 oil rig site, a 1,900,000-pound (860,000 kg) oil derrick was blown over and rolled three times. Due to the extreme nature of the damage at the Cactus-117 oil rig and along I-40, damage in that area was rated EF5. The tornado weakened slightly as it passed north of El Reno and continued northeast, producing EF3 to EF4 damage in rural areas.

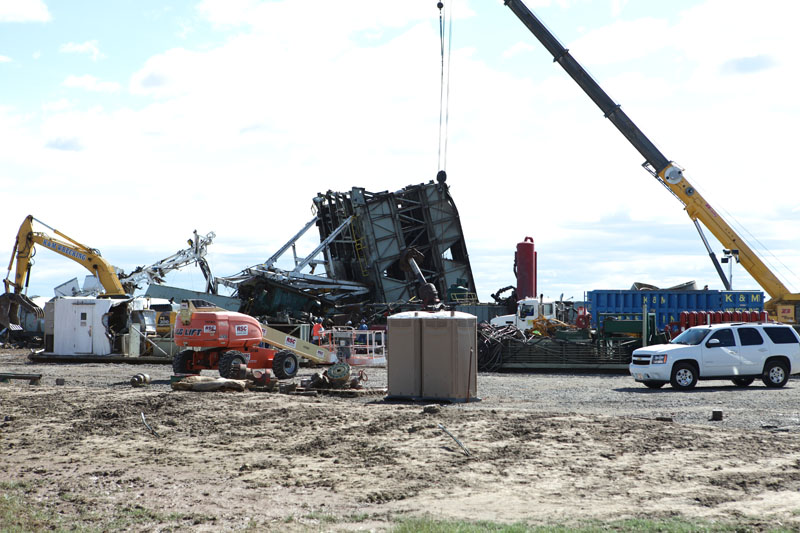
EF5 damage done to the Cactus 117 oil derrick near El Reno.

The tornado then reintensified and passed northwest of Piedmont as a high-end EF4, leveling multiple homes and causing additional fatalities. The Falcon Lake subdivision was particularly hard hit, and multiple homes and vehicles were swept into the lake. One home had nothing left but the foundation slab and an above ground reinforced concrete shelter sustained damage to its metal door from debris impacts. An SUV in this area was thrown 780 yards (710 m) into a wooded thicket, and had its frame torn from the vehicle body, which was found crumpled around a debarked tree. The frame was twisted apart and was found nearby, along with the engine block and axles.

The tornado weakened to EF3 strength as it crossed into Kingfisher County debarking trees and heavily damaging structures. The tornado then weakened further to EF2 strength, with damage confined to outbuildings and trees. Crossing into Logan County south of Cashion, the tornado reintensified slightly, producing a mixture of EF2 and EF3 damage as large high-tension towers were toppled and manufactured homes were destroyed. Frame homes were left with only interior rooms standing in this area, and two people who were caught outside during the tornado were killed. The tornado then rapidly weakened, causing EF0 to EF1 damage along the north side of Guthrie before dissipating.

The mesonet station at El Reno recorded a wind gust of 151 mph (243 km/h) as the tornado passed by, which set a record for the highest wind speed observed by the Oklahoma Mesonet. This was the first EF5 tornado to strike Oklahoma since 1999, when an F5 tornado killed 36 people in and around southern and central parts of the Oklahoma City metropolitan area. Another intense EF3 tornado struck the El Reno area two years later on May 31, 2013, leading to 8 fatalities, 3 of whom were storm chasers and one of which was a resident following the storm; the remaining 4 were local residents. A QLCS EF3 tornado also struck the town on May 25, 2019, killing two people.

=== Chickasha–Blanchard–Newcastle, Oklahoma ===
Chickasha–Blanchard–Newcastle, Oklahoma
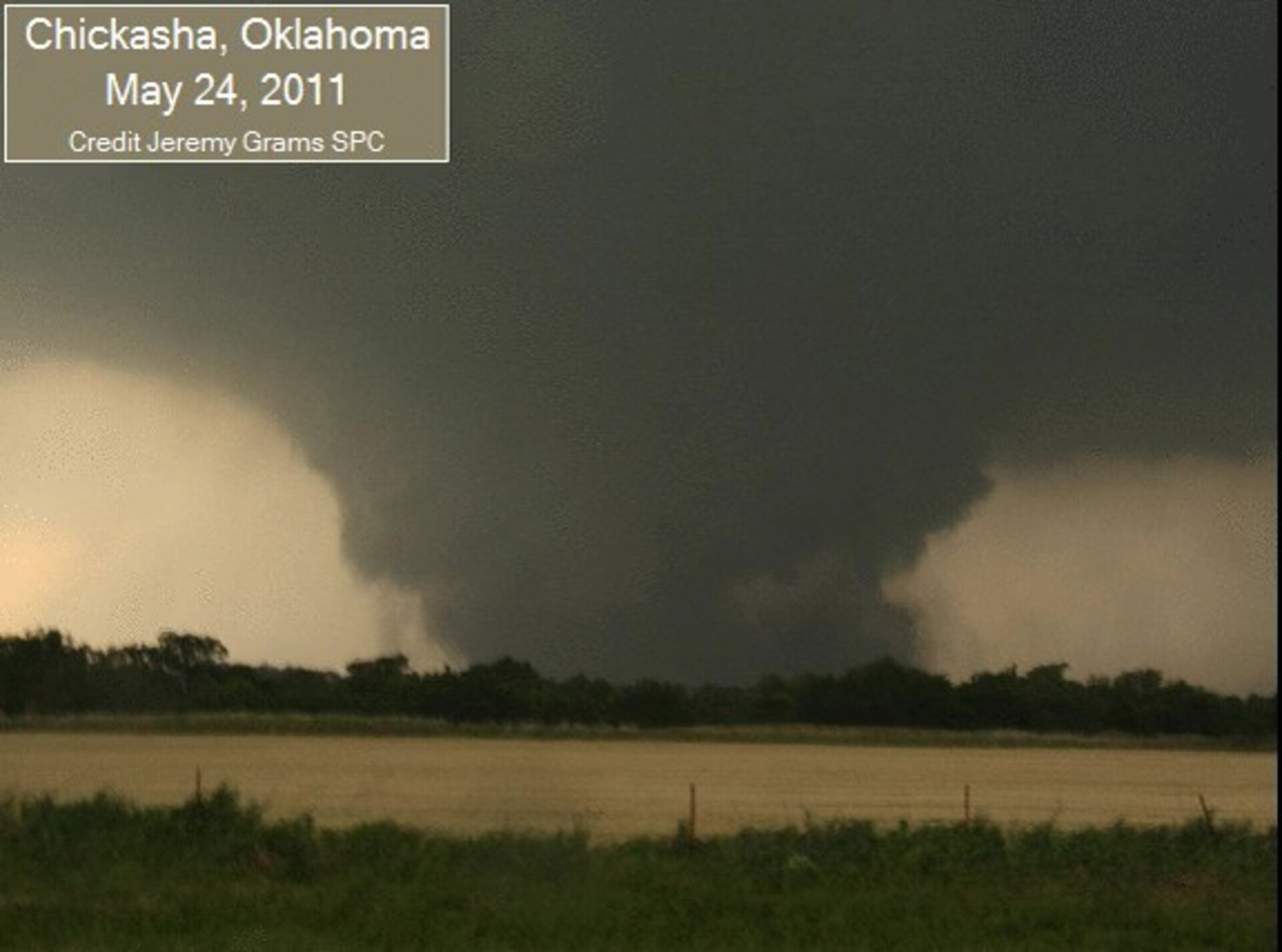
- The wedge tornado near Chickasha.

Meteorological history
- Formed: May 24, 2011, 5:06 p.m. CDT (UTC−05:00)
- Dissipated: May 24, 2011, 6:02 p.m. CDT (UTC–05:00)
- Duration: 56 minutes

EF4 tornado
- on the Enhanced Fujita scale
- Highest winds: 200 mph (320 km/h)

Overall effects
- Casualties: 1 fatality, 48 injuries

As the tornado that struck El Reno and Piedmont dissipated, a separate supercell thunderstorm produced this violent high-end EF4 tornado further to the south in Grady County.

The tornado touched down along the southwest side of Chickasha as a narrow cone shaped tornado, initially causing EF0 damage to roofs, trees, and fences. Continuing northeastward across the south side of town, the tornado reached EF2 strength as it struck a mobile home park, killing one person at that location. A car wash, automotive shop, gas station, and car dealership were damaged nearby. Several apartment buildings and a strip mall sustained major structural damage as the tornado exited town. The tornado destroyed outbuildings, snapped trees, and tossed farming equipment as it crossed US 62 east of town. After crossing the highway, the tornado began to rapidly grow in size and intensity, reaching EF3 strength as homes lost their exterior walls and trees were debarked nearby. Several metal buildings and homes were destroyed at EF2 to EF3 strength along the south side of Friend Road.

The tornado crossed the road and became large and wedge-shaped, reaching EF4 intensity, scouring the ground to bare soil, debarking trees, and leveling homes, one of which was reduced to a bare slab (though this home was nailed rather than bolted to its foundation). Several vehicles were thrown hundreds of yards nearby, including an SUV that was carried 300 yards (270 m) and crumpled into a ball.

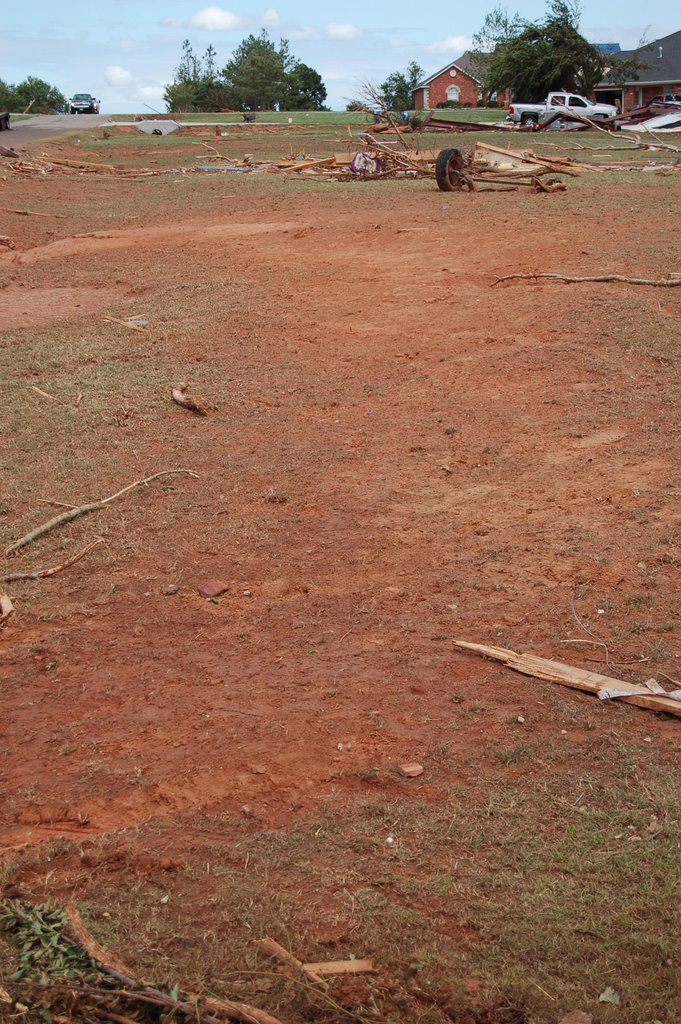
Severe ground scouring in the front lawn of a residence in northern Blanchard. All grass and 2 to 4 inches (5.1 to 10.2 cm) of topsoil was removed.

The tornado maintained EF4 strength crossed E1340 Road further to the northeast, reducing two well-built homes to rubble and destroying two nearby metal buildings. Many trees were debarked in this area, and a mixture of scoured crops, mud, and straw was found piled up to a depth of six feet (1.8 m) against a nearby fence line. A third home sustained collapse of its exterior walls. Further along the path, another well-built home was flattened at EF4 strength, a metal building was destroyed, and vehicles were thrown up to 300 yards (270 m) away along Ballard Road before the violent tornado tore across a series of open fields further to the northeast, leaving behind a continuous swath of debarked trees and scoured grass. An oil pump jack was also destroyed in this area.

The tornado weakened momentarily as it passed to the northwest of the Indian Ridge Golf Course, producing only EF1 tree damage. The tornado re-intensified as it crossed NW 25th Street, completely debarking numerous trees and obliterating several metal buildings, outbuildings, and mobile homes. Several vehicles parked near a residence along N2980 Road were thrown up to 400 yards (370 m) away, some of which were wrapped around trees or stripped down to their frames, and severe ground scouring occurred in this area. Numerous homes were heavily damaged or destroyed in a nearby semi-rural subdivision, one of which was leveled at EF4 intensity.

The tornado then crossed into McClain County, tearing through residential areas along the north edge of Blanchard. According to NWS damage surveyors, the tornado shrunk and tightened to "plausibly EF5 strength" as it approached and crossed Kitty Hawk Road, scouring away a large area of pavement. Sections of asphalt were gouged out by high-velocity debris impacts further along the road, and nearby trees were reduced to completely debarked stumps. As the now narrow, but very intense tornado ripped through the front lawn of a nearby house, all grass and several inches of topsoil was scoured away in a narrow swath. Several homes were reduced to bare slabs in this area, and vehicles were thrown up to 600 yards (550 m) away, including a pickup truck that was torn into multiple pieces. Due to intensity of the damage in this area, surveyors noted that the tornado was "plausibly EF5" as it clipped the north side of Blanchard, though the fact that the homes swept away were missing some of their anchor bolt washers led to a high-end EF4 rating being assigned instead. Just to the northeast, the tornado maintained its strength as it struck a steel-reinforced concrete dome home, which was shredded by flying debris and sustained partial cracking of its frame. Asphalt was scoured from the home's paved driveway. The tornado then weakened to EF3 strength as it crossed Sandrock Road, debarking trees and heavily damaging or destroying several homes in nearby subdivisions. Several cars were blown out from underneath a nearby overpass and mangled. The tornado weakened further as it passed southeast of Newcastle, with mainly tree and power pole damage noted in that area. Additional minor damage to trees, power lines, and outbuildings occurred as the tornado crossed into Cleveland County, executing a loop in a field before dissipating just west of Moore.

Overall, one person was killed and 48 other people were injured by this tornado along its 32-mile (51 km) long path. This tornado followed a similar path to that of the May 1999 Bridge Creek–Moore tornado.

On January 23, 2025, Anthony W. Lyza with the National Severe Storms Laboratory along with Harold E. Brooks and Makenzie J. Kroca with the University of Oklahoma’s School of Meteorology published a paper to the American Meteorological Society, where they stated the tornado in Chickasha was an "EF5 candidate" and opined that the EF5 starting wind speed should be 190 mph (310 km/h) instead of 201 mph (323 km/h).

=== Bradley–Washington–Goldsby, Oklahoma ===
Bradley–Washington–Goldsby, Oklahoma
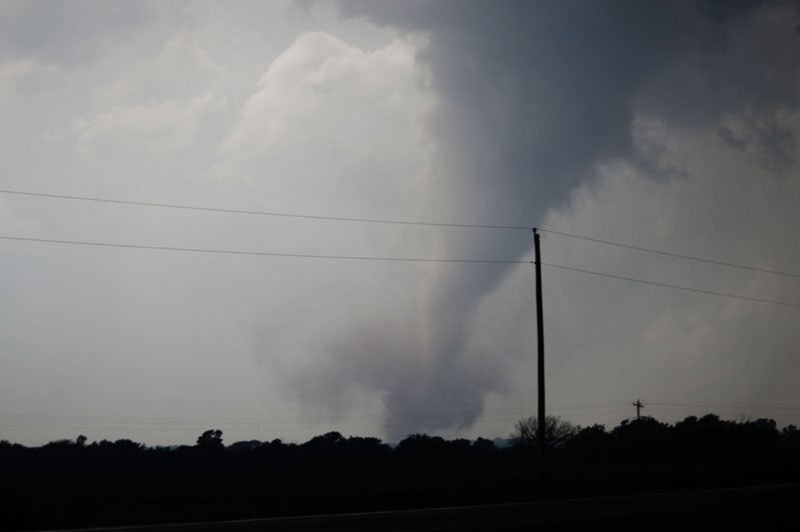
- The tornado as seen from I-35

Meteorological history
- Formed: May 24, 2011, 5:26 p.m. CDT (UTC−05:00)
- Dissipated: May 24, 2011, 6:05 p.m. CDT (UTC–05:00)
- Duration: 39 minutes

EF4 tornado
- on the Enhanced Fujita scale
- Highest winds: 200 mph (320 km/h)

Overall effects
- Casualties: 61 injuries

During the evening of May 24, this violent high-end EF4 tornado caused major damage in rural parts of Grady and McClain Counties at the same time another violent tornado from a separate supercell storm was devastating areas in and around Chickasha and Blanchard.

The tornado touched down west of Bradley, causing EF0 to EF1 tree damage as it crossed SH-19. Continuing to the northeast, the tornado intensified further to EF3 strength as it passed through rural areas of Grady County, snapping and debarking numerous trees. An extensive swath of ground scouring began as the tornado crossed into McClain County. The tornado then reached EF4 strength as it crossed SH-76, leveling and sweeping away several well-built homes. Vehicles were thrown long distances and mangled almost beyond recognition nearby. The tornado weakened and narrowed as it crossed CR 410, with EF2 to EF3-strength damage occurring in that area.

The tornado re-intensified to EF4 strength further to the northeast as it passed between Dibble and Washington. Numerous well-built homes were leveled in that area, and some were swept completely away. Unusual cycloidal debris impact scars were noted in open fields as well. One well-built home in this area with numerous anchor bolts was reduced to a bare slab, though a metal fence immediately next to the house remained standing and grass on the property was not scoured. Another home that was reduced to a bare slab in this area had anchor bolts spaced every two feet (well above the standard of anchoring required for an EF5 rating), though a closer inspection of the home site revealed that a large mobile home frame had smashed into the house during the tornado, and a Jacuzzi found in the rubble behind the house was still in usable condition. Due to these contextual discrepancies, damage in this area was rated high-end EF4 rather than EF5.

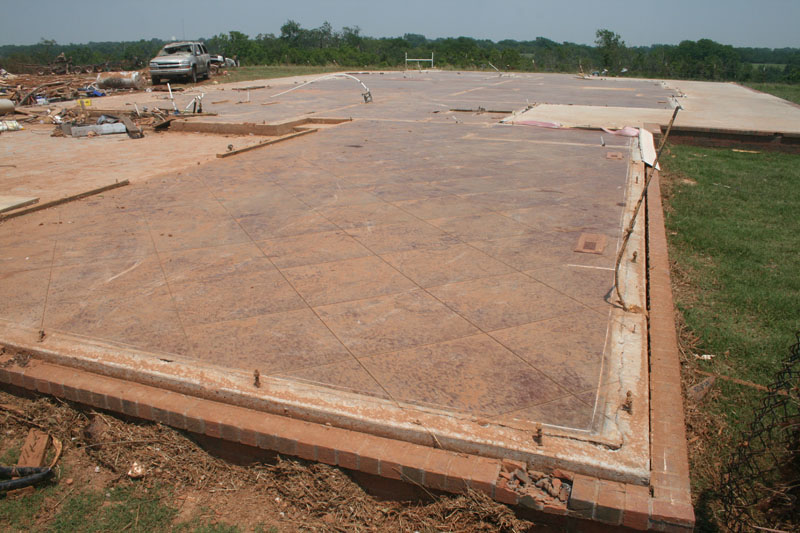
A large home that was reduced to a bare slab just outside of Goldsby.

The tornado curved sharply to the north and weakened to EF3 strength as it continued north of Washington, though one final area of EF4 damage occurred southwest of Goldsby as a large, well-built home was completely swept away with only the slab remaining, and large metal storage tanks behind the house were tossed. This home was specifically engineered to be tornado resistant, though close inspection of the foundation revealed that some of the anchor bolt washers were missing, and the ones that were present were slightly too small, preventing a rating higher than EF4. Further to the north, minor EF0 damage occurred near David Jay Perry Airport before the tornado dissipated. Large amounts of debris from this tornado reportedly fell from the sky in Norman.

Overall, the tornado was on the ground for 23 miles (37 km). 61 people were injured, though no fatalities occurred. Despite the presence of multiple well-built, anchor-bolted homes being swept completely away along the path, the tornado was not rated EF5 due to several contextual discrepancies and minor anchoring flaws. A high-end EF4 rating was applied as a result. Despite this, much like the Chickasha–Blanchard tornado, the EF4 rating is disputed, and the tornado is suspected by some in the academic sector to have been an EF5.

On January 23, 2025, Anthony W. Lyza with the National Severe Storms Laboratory along with Harold E. Brooks and Makenzie J. Kroca with the University of Oklahoma’s School of Meteorology published a paper to the American Meteorological Society, where they stated the tornado in Goldsby was an "EF5 candidate" and opined that the EF5 starting wind speed should be 190 mph (310 km/h) instead of 201 mph (323 km/h).

=== Etna–Denning–Centerpoint–Bethlehem, Arkansas ===
Etna–Denning–Centerpoint–Bethlehem, Arkansas
- Radar loop of the supercell responsible for producing the Etna-Denning EF4 tornado.

Meteorological history
- Formed: May 24, 2011, 11:53 p.m. CDT (UTC−05:00)
- Dissipated: May 25, 2011, 12:50 a.m. CDT (UTC–05:00)
- Duration: 57 minutes

EF4 tornado
- on the Enhanced Fujita scale
- Highest winds: 170 mph (270 km/h)

Overall effects
- Casualties: 4 fatalities, 27 injuries
- Damage: $9.075 million (2011 USD)

During the overnight hours of May 24–25, this very large and violent wedge tornado, rated low-end EF4, tracked through several small communities in western Arkansas. The tornado touched down at 11:53 p.m. CDT (04:53 UTC) as an EF1 south of Branch in Franklin County, snapping trees and power poles and damaging a mobile home.

The tornado then clipped a section of Logan County, snapping multiple trees before crossing back into Franklin county, where it grew to nearly one mile (1.6 km) wide and reached low-end EF4 strength as it tore through the small community of Etna, completely destroying numerous frame homes, mobile homes, and a metal building. Some of the homes were well-built, but were left with only a small amount of debris on their foundations. Several trees were debarked, power poles were snapped, outbuildings were destroyed, and the ground was scarred by debris impacts. One person in Etna was killed, and six others were seriously injured. Past Etna, the tornado destroyed a very well-built steel-frame home, leaving only interior walls standing. The structure was not entirely flattened, though a low-end EF4 rating was applied due to how well-constructed the house was. As the tornado crossed back into Logan County, it weakened to EF2 strength but grew extremely large, expanding to 1 1/4 miles (2.0 km) in width and snapping numerous trees.

The tornado then intensified to EF3 strength, and once again crossed back into Franklin County, striking the town of Denning. Numerous homes and mobile homes were destroyed in Denning, many trees and power poles were snapped, and large 100-foot tall metal high-tension poles were bent to the ground. Two people were killed in town and 11 others were injured. The tornado then continued into Johnson County and weakened to EF2 strength, heavily damaging several homes in Centerpoint, and downing numerous trees in the community cemetery. The tornado then struck the community of Bethlehem, where frame homes were damaged, mobile homes were destroyed, and one person was killed. Continuing through the Harmony community, the tornado damaged multiple residences, barns, chicken houses, and outbuildings before continuing into the Ozark National Forest and dissipating southeast of Rosetta at 12:50 a.m. CDT (05:50 UTC).

The tornado was on the ground for a total of 45.71 miles (73.56 km), killing four people and injuring 27 others.

=== Clarksville–Strawberry–Bertha, Arkansas ===
Clarksville–Strawberry–Bertha, Arkansas
- An aerial view of the damage in Clarksville.

Meteorological history
- Formed: May 25, 2011, 12:25 a.m. CDT (UTC−05:00)
- Dissipated: May 25, 2011, 12:57 a.m. CDT (UTC–05:00)
- Duration: 32 minutes

EF3 tornado
- on the Enhanced Fujita scale
- Highest winds: 145 mph (233 km/h)

Overall effects
- Casualties: 1 fatality, 4 injuries
- Damage: $13.025 million (2011 USD)

While the EF4 tornado that struck Etna and Denning was ongoing across Johnson County, Arkansas, a new large and deadly tornado developed just north of the Arkansas River during the midnight hours of May 25. Both tornadoes moved northeastward simultaneously throughout the county.

The new tornado formed right along AR 109 to the southwest of the city of Clarksville, at 12:25 a.m. CDT (05:25 UTC). Approximately six minutes later, a tornado warning was issued at 12:36 a.m. CDT by the National Weather Service office in Little Rock. The tornado then moved into Clarksville proper, causing extensive damage in the city's residential areas. Throughout the southern and eastern portions of Clarksville, the tornado impacted residencies, businesses and the city's country club. Power in the most heavily impacted areas was also disrupted by the storm, which was restored a week after the tornado. The path track the tornado left behind was also similar to one another tornado, one rated F3 on the Fujita scale, that impacted Clarksville back on April 7, 1980.

After leaving Clarksville, the tornado continued northeast, passing between the rural communities of Strawberry and Chronister Store, northwest of Hagarville. One 65-year old man within the Strawberry area, was killed inside the home of his goat farm, becoming the only fatality attributed by this intense tornado. At least 150 homes were damaged or destroyed throughout Johnson County as the tornado continued heading towards the northeast, moving into the Ozark National Forest. The storm downed many trees across wooded areas, blocking access to roads within the forest. At 12:52 a.m. CDT (05:52 UTC) the tornado exited out of Johnson County, having inflicted EF3 damage at its most severe and injuring four people. Now in Pope County, south-southwest of Bertha, the tornado shrunk in size from 1,430 yards (1,310 m) down to 350 yards (320 m). It also weakened drastically at this point, now having only recorded EF1 damage. After being on the ground for more than half an hour, the lethal tornado dissipated five minutes later, at 12:57 a.m. CDT (05:57 UTC) in northwestern Pope County.

This intense tornado lasted along a lifespan of 32 minutes across Johnson and Pope Counties, with a maximum width of 1,430 yards (1,310 m) at its largest and an assessed path length of 29.01 miles (46.69 km). An estimated $13,025,000 (2011 USD) was inflicted, with four injuries and one death attributed. Clarksville's power supply was down until the end of the day on May 25 for around 70% of the electric customers. For the hardest hit regions, power was not restored until a week after the event.

=== Grandin–Ellsinore–Silva–Buckhorn, Missouri ===
Grandin–Ellsinore–Silva–Buckhorn, Missouri
- The tornado seen near Ellsinore.

Meteorological history
- Formed: May 25, 2011, 3:49 p.m. CDT (UTC−05:00)
- Dissipated: May 25, 2011, 4:41 p.m. CDT (UTC–05:00)
- Duration: 52 minutes

EF3 tornado
- on the Enhanced Fujita scale
- Highest winds: 150 mph (240 km/h)

Overall effects
- Casualties: 2 injuries
- Damage: $800,000 (2011 USD)

During the afternoon hours of May 25, a volatile environment was set up from Arkansas to Kentucky, as robust mid-level winds and deep layer wind shear aided an atmosphere favorable for long-track supercells and tornadoes.

At 3:49 p.m. CDT (20:49 UTC) to the southwest of Grandin, Missouri, a tornado touched down before moving north and past the city. Within the area, two mobile homes were destroyed and a school suffered extensive levels of damage, as the entire roof system was compromised and torn away. Heading northeast, the tornado traversed the wooded areas of Carter County, uprooting or snapping numerous trees and telephone poles. Several cows in this portion of the track were also killed, before the tornado began to pass east of Ellsinore.

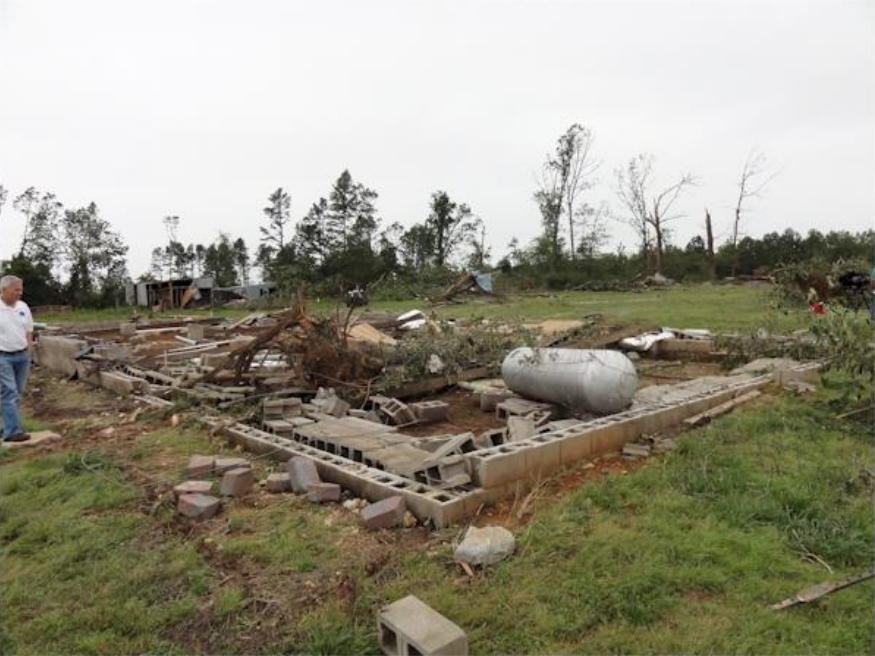
A destroyed home in the area.

East of Ellsinore, the tornado reached peak intensity, as an unanchored modular home with conventionally built-on addons, was blown away and deposited at an unknown distance. Houses nearby suffered moderate to major levels of damage, including one residence that was blown off alongside its roof. Several large oak trees were nubbed out, while hundreds of others in the vicinity were blown down. Damage surveyors from the National Weather Service office from Paducah, Kentucky discovered the presence of suction vortices within the damage swath, suggesting that this was a multiple-vortex tornado. At least one storm spotter visually witnessed the suction vortices first hand when encountering the tornado. A national television crew was live on air, broadcasting the tornado as it was ongoing near Ellsinore at the time. The tornado then at 4:05 p.m. CDT (21:05 UTC) exited out of Carter County, tracking approximately 16 minutes throughout the region. The average size of the tornado was 200 yards (180 m) across this portion of the track.

The tornado then entered Wayne County, to the west of Williamsville. Persisting towards the northeast slightly, the storm impacted one log home in the southwestern part of the county, leveling it. Around 48 houses were impacted as the tornado headed towards the small community of Silva, as it was tracking far east of Piedmont. Of the approximately 48 houses, most of them were struck in the Silva area, nine suffered major damage while 39 others were compromised at minor levels. Within the community, a camper and mobile home were struck and destroyed. A family did not take shelter in time, with the tornado critically injuring one member as a large tree fell on them. Another family also caught by the storm, as one of their members suffered lesser injuries from the hip to their head. Numerous vehicles were damaged or destroyed from flying debris and or falling trees, causing most streets to be inaccessible to drive on. Hundreds of acres of forested regions were uprooted and snapped by the tornado, and a 0.5 mi (0.80 km) section of MO 34 was closed from fallen trees and powerlines. An average path width of 450 yards (410 m) was measured here as the tornado moved through. Around 4:43 p.m. CDT (21:43 UTC) the tornado entered Madison County to the southwest of Buckhorn, now at a weakening trend. Many large trees were blown down in southern Madison County, before three minutes later the tornado dissipated after crossing Middle Fork Big Creek, far southwest of Marquand, at 4:46 p.m. CDT (21:46 UTC).

This large, long-track and intense tornado, was on the ground for a total of 47.41 miles (76.30 km). At its largest, the tornado had a measured width of 1,200 yards (1,100 m). Across Carter and Wayne Counties, at least $800,000 (2011 USD) in monetary losses were inflicted. Peak winds were estimated at 150 mph (240 km/h) according to the National Centers for Environmental Information. The EF3 tornado also occurred next to the path of an F4 tornado that took place on April 24, 2002.

== Non-tornadic effects ==
At least three people were killed in the Atlanta metropolitan area as a result of straight-line winds on the evening of May 26, likely due to a downburst.

== Impacts ==
=== May 22 event ===
==== Aftermath ====
Immediately following the Joplin tornado, emergency responders were deployed within and to the city to undertake search and rescue efforts. Then Missouri state governor Jay Nixon declared a state of emergency for the Joplin area shortly after the tornado hit, and ordered Missouri National Guard troops to the city. By May 23, Missouri Task Force One (consisting of 85 personnel, four dogs, and heavy equipment) arrived and began searching for missing persons. Five heavy rescue teams were also sent to the city a day later. Within two days, numerous agencies arrived to assist residents in the recovery process. The National Guard deployed 191 personnel and placed 2,000 more on standby to be deployed if needed. In addition, the Missouri State Highway Patrol provided 180 troopers to assist the Joplin Police Department and other local agencies with law enforcement, rescue, and recovery efforts that also included the deployment of five ambulance strike teams, and a total of 25 ambulances in the affected area on May 24 as well over 75 Marines from the Ft. Leonard Wood Army base. Due to the severe damage caused by the tornado, the traveling Piccadilly Circus was unable to perform as scheduled. As a result, the circus employees brought their two adult elephants to help drag damaged automobiles and other heavy debris out of the streets.

=== May 24 event ===
==== Closures and cancellations ====
In advance of the day's severe weather the University of Oklahoma suspended classes in the afternoon for all three of its campuses. American Airlines canceled 126 flights at Dallas-Fort Worth International Airport, and as the tornado outbreak progressed near Oklahoma City operations were suspended at Will Rogers World Airport.

==== Political response ====
Governor of Oklahoma Mary Fallin declared a state of emergency in 68 counties on May 24, before taking to the air to survey damage in a number of areas. On May 29, Governor Fallin requested that the White House issue a federal major disaster declaration for seven of the 68 Oklahoma counties, and on June 6 President Obama approved Governor Fallin's request for federal disaster relief.

== See also ==
- List of F5 and EF5 tornadoes
- List of North American tornadoes and tornado outbreaks
- List of tornadoes hitting downtown areas of large cities
