= David Jay Perry Airport =

- IATA: none; ICAO: none; FAA LID: 1K4

Summary
- Airport type: Public
- Owner: Town of Goldsby
- Serves: Goldsby, Oklahoma
- Elevation AMSL: 1,168 ft (356 m)
- Coordinates: 35°09′18.2430″N 097°28′13.4180″W
- Interactive map of David Jay Perry Airport

Runways
Direction	Length		Surface
Direction	ft	m	Surface
13/31	3,006	916	Concrete
17/35	1,803	550	Asphalt
- Source: Federal Aviation Administration

David Jay Perry Airport is a town-owned public-use airport in Goldsby, a town in McClain County, Oklahoma, United States. The airport is located near the interchange of I-35 and State Highway 74. The airport was originally built by the US Navy in 1943 as an octagonal-shaped Outlying Landing Field serving Naval Air Station Norman, OK, six miles to the north. After the war, ownership of the field was transferred to the city of Goldsby, undergoing several improvements and expansions over the following decades.

== Facilities and aircraft ==
David Jay Perry Airport covers an area of 392 acres (159 ha) at an elevation of 1,113 feet (339 m) above mean sea level. It has two runways—one designated 17/35 with a 1,803×60 ft (550×18 m) asphalt surface, and one designated 13/31 with a 3,006×60 ft (916×18 m) concrete surface.

== See also ==
- List of airports in Oklahoma
