= Bradley, Oklahoma =

- Town
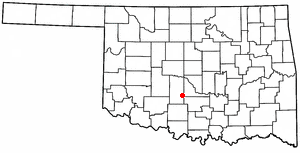
- Location of Bradley, Oklahoma
- Coordinates: 34°52′34″N 97°42′32″W
- Country: United States
- State: Oklahoma
- County: Grady

Area
  - Total: 0.24 sq mi (0.61 km^{2})
  - Land: 0.24 sq mi (0.61 km^{2})
  - Water: 0 sq mi (0.00 km^{2})
- Elevation: 1,083 ft (330 m)

Population (2020)
  - Total: 78
  - Density: 330/sq mi (127.4/km^{2})
- Time zone: UTC-6 (Central (CST))
  - Summer (DST): UTC-5 (CDT)
- ZIP code: 73011
- Area code: 405
- FIPS code: 40-08300
- GNIS feature ID: 2411717
- Website: bradley-ok.us

Bradley is a town in Grady County, Oklahoma, United States. The population was 78 at the 2020 United States census.

== Geography ==
According to the United States Census Bureau, the town has a total area of 0.2 square miles (0.52 km^{2}), all land.

== Demographics ==
Historical population
Census	Pop.	Note	%±
1940	281		—
1950	248		−11.7%
1960	294		18.5%
1970	247		−16.0%
1980	284		15.0%
1990	166		−41.5%
2000	182		9.6%
2010	130		−28.6%
2020	78		−40.0%
U.S. Decennial Census

=== 2020 census ===
As of the 2020 census, Bradley had a population of 78. The median age was 47.5 years. 24.4% of residents were under the age of 18 and 24.4% of residents were 65 years of age or older. For every 100 females there were 122.9 males, and for every 100 females age 18 and over there were 90.3 males age 18 and over.

0.0% of residents lived in urban areas, while 100.0% lived in rural areas.

There were 36 households in Bradley, of which 38.9% had children under the age of 18 living in them. Of all households, 55.6% were married-couple households, 16.7% were households with a male householder and no spouse or partner present, and 22.2% were households with a female householder and no spouse or partner present. About 22.3% of all households were made up of individuals and 8.3% had someone living alone who was 65 years of age or older.

There were 46 housing units, of which 21.7% were vacant. The homeowner vacancy rate was 0.0% and the rental vacancy rate was 0.0%.

Racial composition as of the 2020 census
Race	Number	Percent
White	64	82.1%
Black or African American	0	0.0%
American Indian and Alaska Native	6	7.7%
Asian	0	0.0%
Native Hawaiian and Other Pacific Islander	0	0.0%
Some other race	0	0.0%
Two or more races	8	10.3%
Hispanic or Latino (of any race)	4	5.1%

=== 2000 census ===
At the 2000 census there were 182 people, 67 households, and 52 families living in the town. The population density was 801.8 inhabitants per square mile (309.6/km^{2}). There were 82 housing units at an average density of 361.2 per square mile (139.5/km^{2}). The racial makeup of the town was 90.11% White, 4.40% Native American, 0.55% Asian, and 4.95% from two or more races. Hispanic or Latino of any race were 1.10%.

Of the 67 households 41.8% had children under the age of 18 living with them, 68.7% were married couples living together, 6.0% had a female householder with no husband present, and 20.9% were non-families. 19.4% of households were one person and 6.0% were one person aged 65 or older. The average household size was 2.72 and the average family size was 3.08.

The age distribution was 29.7% under the age of 18, 6.6% from 18 to 24, 35.2% from 25 to 44, 22.0% from 45 to 64, and 6.6% 65 or older. The median age was 33 years. For every 100 females, there were 106.8 males. For every 100 females age 18 and over, there were 100.0 males.

The median household income was $21,429 and the median family income was $20,938. Males had a median income of $17,250 versus $13,333 for females. The per capita income for the town was $9,165. About 22.0% of families and 26.7% of the population were below the poverty line, including 27.3% of those under the age of 18 and 64.7% of those 65 or over.

== Notable people ==
- Richie Albright (1940-2021), country musician
