= 2011 St. Louis tornado =

EF4 tornado in the St. Louis, Missouri, USA metropolitan area

Coordinates: 38°42′56″N 90°29′38″W

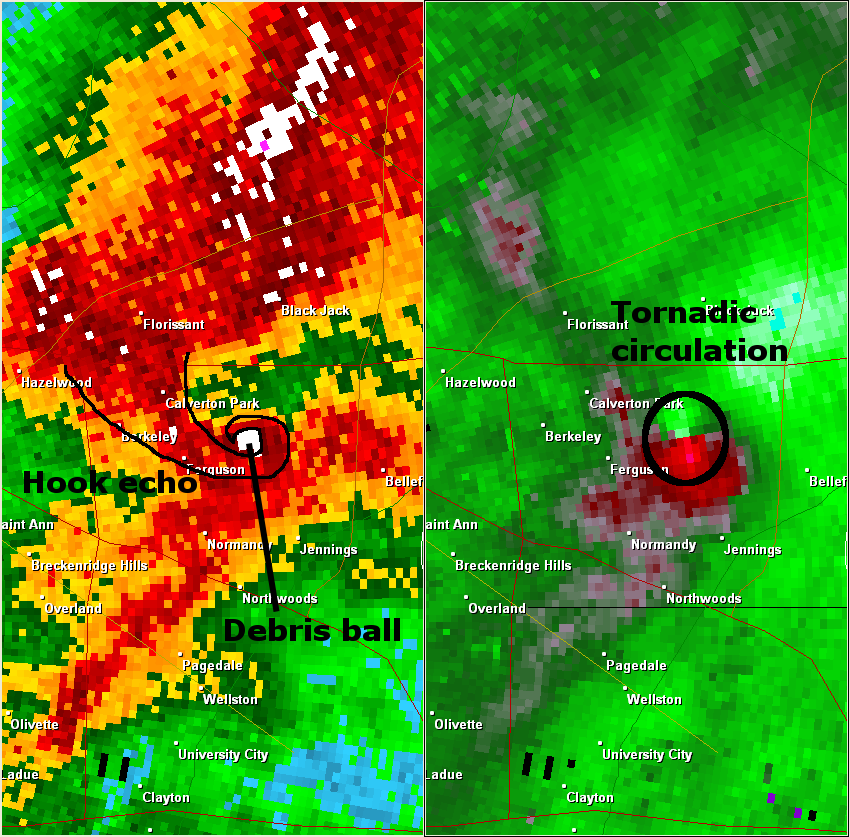
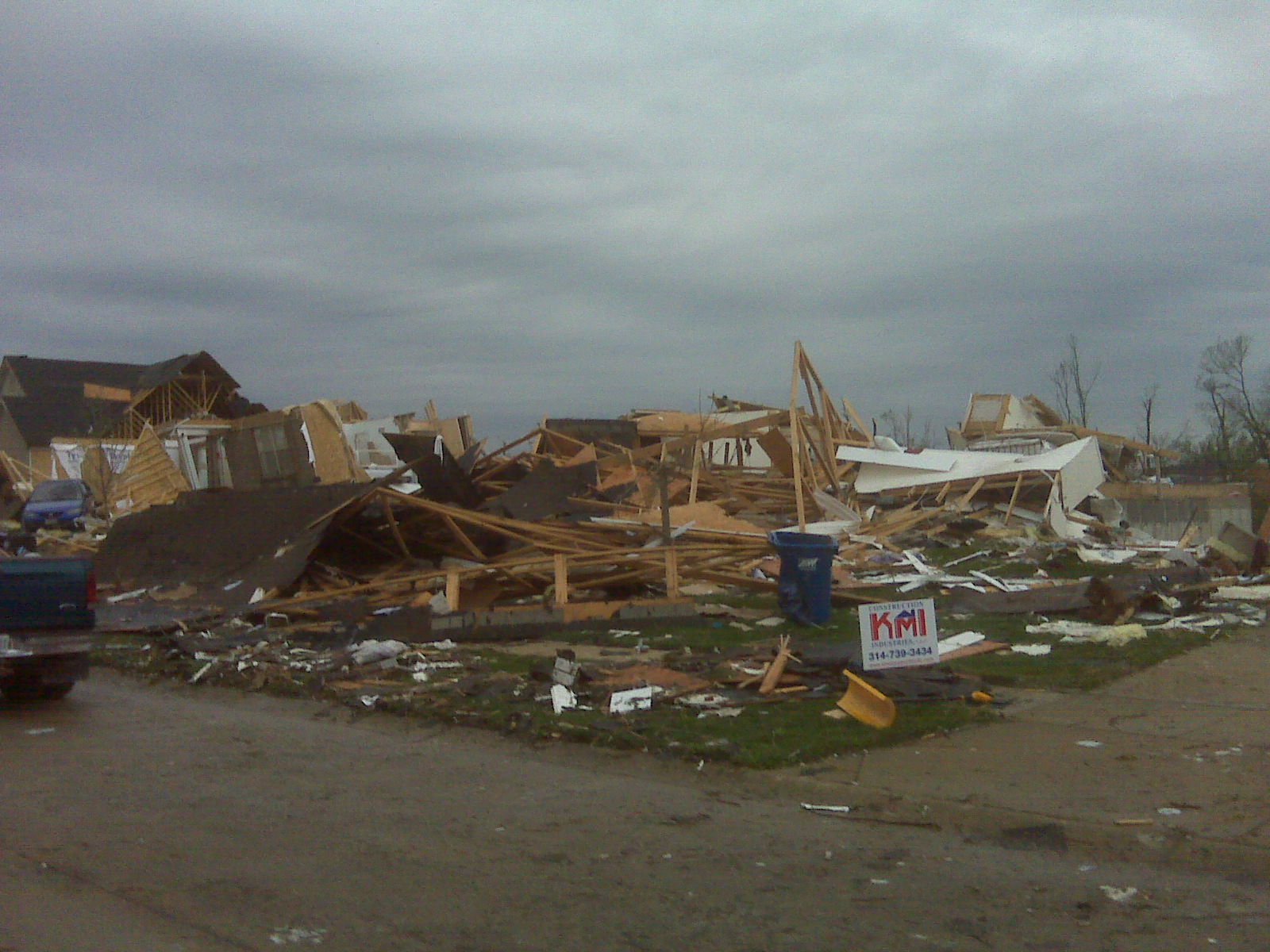
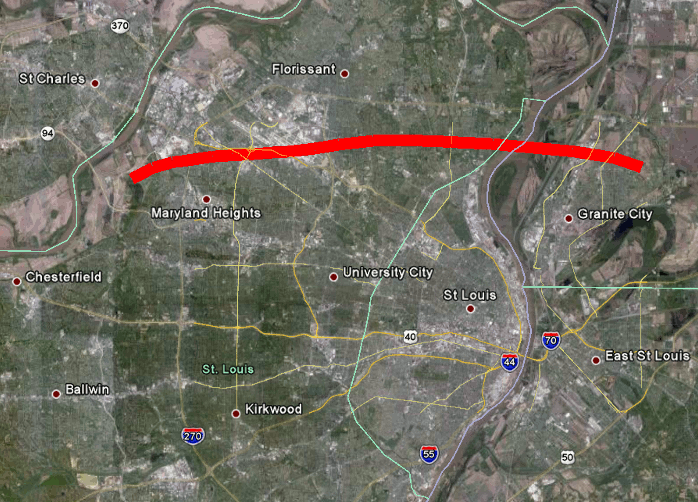
- Clockwise from the top: The rainwrapped (Note: Rainwrapped tornadoes are tornadoes that are shrouded by rain. These tornadoes are often harder, if not impossible to visually spot and confirm.) EF4 tornado being illuminated by a power flash along Interstate 70, in Bridgeton, Missouri; a house along Beaverton Drive impacted at high-end EF3 intensity in Bridgeton; significant structural damage seen inside of a St. Louis Lambert International Airport concourse; a path of the tornado across the northern St. Louis suburbs; a Next-Generation Radar scan of the supercell, detailing the tornadic circulation and other storm features

Meteorological history
- Formed: April 22, 2011, 7:59 PM CDT (UTC–05:00)
- Dissipated: April 22, 2011, 8:31 PM CDT (UTC–05:00)
- Duration: 32 minutes

EF4 tornado
- on the Enhanced Fujita scale
- Max width: 880 yards (0.50 mi; 0.80 km)
- Path length: 21.3 miles (34.3 km)
- Highest winds: 170 mph (270 km/h)

Overall effects
- Fatalities: 0
- Injuries: 5
- Damage: >$250 million (Note: The aforementioned financial totals are in 2011 U.S. dollars.) (>$590,950,000 in 2025 USD)
- Areas affected: Northern suburbs of St. Louis, Missouri and Illinois, United States; specifically Maryland Heights, Bridgeton, St. Ann, Berkeley, Ferguson, Bellefontaine Neighbors, Missouri and Granite City, Illinois
- Part of the Tornado outbreak and derecho of April 19–22, 2011 and Tornadoes of 2011

Just after nightfall on Good Friday, April 22, 2011, a violent and destructive tornado, with estimated maximum wind speeds of 170 mph (270 km/h), impacted the northern St. Louis metropolitan region across the U.S states of Missouri and Illinois. The tornado, widely known as the Good Friday tornado, was the strongest to impact the St. Louis area since January 1967, traveling through portions of Madison and St. Louis counties, including the northern side of St. Louis city.

The tornado was produced by a supercell thunderstorm that moved into the area, forming in the city of Maryland Heights, Missouri, after sunset. Along its 21.3 mile (34.3 km) long path across the metropolitan area, the tornado impacted various neighborhoods, damaging numerous residences and businesses in its wake. In Bridgeton, Missouri, the tornado reached its peak intensity as it impacted houses along Old St. Charles Road and around Harmann Estates, heavily damaging or destroying several residences; one was leveled at EF4 intensity. The tornado continued eastward, weakening to EF2 strength as it struck St. Louis Lambert International Airport, inflicting severe damage and injuring several people. The tornado tracked through several more neighborhoods in northern St. Louis before crosisng the Mississippi River and entering Granite City, Illinois, tearing the roofs off several homes before dissipating.

The tornado was part of a major four-day tornado outbreak that took place during April 2011, which was the most active month for tornadoes in United States history. It was one of two tornadoes rated EF3 or greater during the multi-day event, alongside an EF3 tornado that occurred in Macoupin County, Illinois on April 19. The Good Friday tornado was also the first violent tornado to occur in Missouri since a deadly EF4 tornado struck Newton County in 2008.

After the tornado, the Federal Aviation Administration (FAA) closed St. Louis Lambert International Airport for nearly 24 hours. Soon after, Missouri governor Jay Nixon declared a state of emergency for the affected region, with U.S. president Barack Obama following in early-May. On April 27, the Federal Emergency Management Agency (FEMA) was deployed to St. Louis to conduct financial loss investigations, with the U.S. Secretary of Homeland Security, Janet Napolitano, on April 29. Engineers from Thornton Tomasetti arrived within 48 hours of the event at Lambert International Airport, conducting structural assessments of the integrity of the affected buildings. Recovery efforts in the metro were immediate following the Good Friday tornado, with everything rebuilt within 10 years and later. In 2012, the airport had its damaged Concourse C building reconstructed. The same year, the National Oceanic and Atmospheric Administration (NOAA) published a report on the poor handling of tornado preparedness actions by the airport. St. Louis Lambert International Airport eventually became the first "storm-ready" airport in the United States.

== Climatological background ==
Tornadoes recorded during all months from 1950 to 2004 in the county warning area of NWS St. Louis. Note that the tornadoes are rated using the Fujita scale.

Missouri has a notable history when it comes to tornadoes, including historic and deadly tornadoes such as the 1925 Tri-State tornado and 2011 Joplin tornado. (Note: This tornado occurred exactly a month later, on May 22, 2011.) A meteorologist at the St. Louis National Weather Service (NWS) reported over 2,500 tornadoes have touched down in Missouri since 1950, though the yearly count varies. On average, Missouri experiences over 30 tornadoes annually, with most tornadoes occurring from April to June.

St. Louis is located along the confluence of the Missouri and Mississippi Rivers, and near the geographical center of the U.S. Its position in the mid-latitudes allows for warm, moist air that moves north from the Gulf of Mexico to enter the region, along with cold air masses that advect south from Canada. The result concludes in thunderstorm activity in the area, which occurs on average 40–50 days per year. A few severe thunderstorms usually occur every season, capable of producing large hail, damaging winds, and tornadoes. The city has experienced numerous significant (EF2+) tornadoes since recordkeeping began in 1950. (Note: Tornado recordkeeping in the United States was marked in 1950 with the National Severe Storms Forecast Center (NSSFC) data base. Further documentation efforts took place in 1953 during the inclusion of U.S. Weather Bureau tornado watches.) Tornadoes were prevalent before official recordkeeping, including a very deadly and destructive tornado in May 1896. This tornado became the one of the costliest tornadoes in U.S. history at the time. In February 1959 and January 1967, St. Louis was impacted by two major tornado outbreaks, with one F4 tornado impacting the city in both outbreaks.

== Forecasting ==
On April 16, 2011, the Storm Prediction Center (SPC), the agency tasked with forecasting potential severe weather in advance, highlighted a possible severe weather hazard for parts of the southern Great Plains and lower Missouri River Valley, east towards the central Mississippi River area, for April 21–22. A shortwave trough, with help from large-scale forcing needed for ascent, was set to sweep across the western and central U.S., initiating a severe thunderstorm threat in the region for the following week.

In the evening on Thursday, April 21, the SPC highlighted two areas of the central U.S. under a slight risk for severe weather on April 22: one region in parts of west-central Texas and southwestern Oklahoma, while the other over portions of northeastern Oklahoma, western and central Missouri, northwestern Arkansas, and southeastern Kansas. A large region of cyclonic flow (Note: Cyclonic flow specifies to winds that flow counterclockwise in the Northern Hemisphere towards a low-pressure area (low), such as a cyclone. Cyclonically flowing winds in the Southern Hemisphere in opposition, move in a clockwise orientation towards an accompanying low.) was forecasted to interact with two shortwave troughs over the Pacific Northwest, with strong perturbation (Note: See definitions of perturbation at The American Meteorological Society.) moving from the Oregon/Washington area to Idaho. The southern, leading trough of the pair was expected to move over the central Rocky Mountains and parts of the High Plains, as expected from the forecasts in advance.

=== Day of the event ===
==== Initial hours ====
During the midnight hours of Friday, April 22, the SPC issued adjusted convective outlooks for the day's upcoming weather threat. A region across the contiguous U.S., spanning from central Texas to southwestern Ohio, was put under a singular, large slight risk. A 5% tornado risk was mapped over most of Missouri, central Illinois, southern Indiana, and northwestern Kentucky. By the late morning hours, SPC forecasters updated the weather outlooks again, with a moderate risk put in effect that spanned across eastern Oklahoma, northwestern Arkansas, and southeastern Missouri. This risk was mainly catered to a 45% hatched (Note: Hatched risks refer to a 10% or greater chance of significant severe weather events taking place within 25 miles (40 km) of any set point in the forecasted area of risk. Traditional hatched risks were eventually replaced in 2026 by level 1–3 Conditional Intensity Groups. Regarding the old system: For tornadoes, it could mean those of EF2 strength or stronger.; For thunderstorms wind gusts, it could be interpreted for hurricane-force winds of 74 miles per hour (119 km/h) or higher.; For hail, a diameter of 2 inches (5.1 cm) or greater is guaranteed to likely occur.) hail threat that was situated over the three aforementioned U.S. states. In addition, a 10% tornado risk over southeastern Missouri and southern Illinois and a 30% wind hazard from northeastern Oklahoma to far southwestern Ohio was predicted by the SPC.

Storm Prediction Center convective outlooks on April 22, 2011 (Note: The "z" timestamp indicators refer to Zulu military time zones, named after the NATO phonetic alphabet. Zulu time zones are equal to Coordinated Universal Time.)

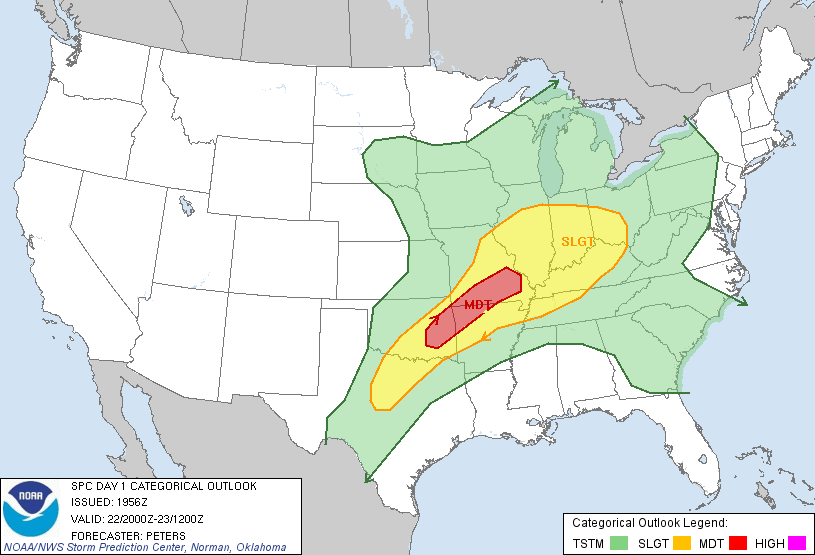
Day 1 2000z categorical outlooks

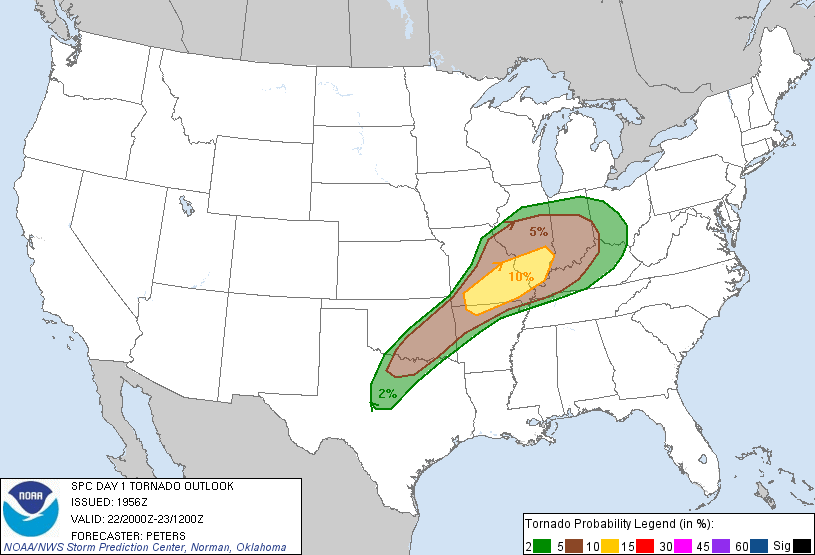
Day 1 2000z tornado outlooks

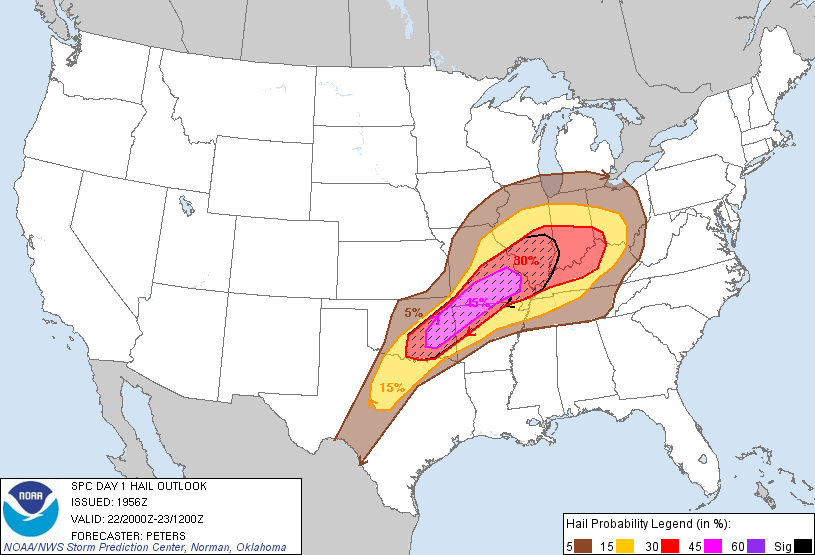
Day 1 2000z hail outlooks

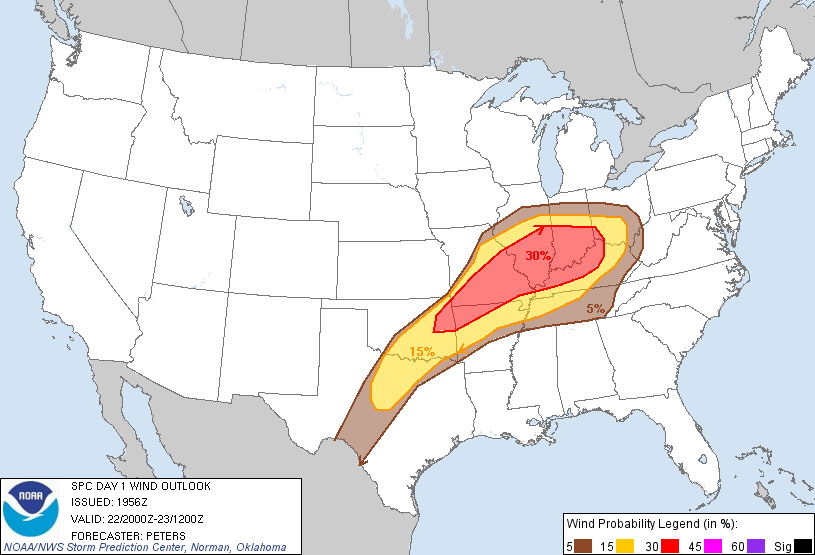
Day 1 2000z wind outlooks

A fast-moving, upper-level low (Note: An upper-level low is a synonym for a trough.) over the central Great Plains was set to track into the Upper Midwest, with a potent low-level jet (LLJ) aiding the low by rapidly bringing moisture from the Gulf of Mexico northward. Dew points were expected to be in the middle 60° Fahrenheit (16° Celsius) range over the target area in the later hours. A surface cold front swept southeastward across northwestern Oklahoma and was extant from the state's central region towards southeastern Kansas by the late afternoon. Daytime heating eventually eroded the capping inversion and helped the development of scattered thunderstorms along the cold front; even more isolated thunderstorms developed further in the warm sector. (Note: Warm and cold sectors refer to two regions of air masses that trail alongside cold and warm fronts.: A warm sector usually sits in between the cold and warm fronts, with these traditionally oriented west and north of the warm air mass. This is where the warmest air is to be found within a weather system.; A cold sector sits just west of the cold front, with the region seeing much cooler temperatures due to colder winds coming from the north. This is parallel to the warm sector, which receives warmer air from the south.) Atmospheric soundings showed steep mid-level lapse rates (Note: Mid-level lapse rates, also known as the 700–500-millibar lapse rates, are meant to distinguish areas in the atmosphere that have higher likelihoods of convections with large depths.) and rather large hodograph vectors, suggesting that supercell thunderstorms in the target area are capable of producing very large hail and damaging winds. Tornadoes, meanwhile, remained a great concern for the northern parts of Arkansas and the southern halves of Missouri and Illinois, where abundant low-level wind shear (LLWS) (Note: Low-level wind shear is wind shear that rapidly changes in a 200 feet (61 m) layer, at the lowest 2,000 feet (610 m) of the atmosphere. This part is called the troposphere.) existed near a retreating warm front. Storms were expected to persist across the central Mississippi and Ohio River regions.

==== Ongoing storms and tornado watch ====
Mesoscale discussion map showing potent wind shear levels in Missouri, and areas under a tornado watch

At 3:00 PM Central Daylight Time (CDT) (Note: Correlates to 20:00 Coordinated Universal Time.) on April 22, the SPC reported a cluster (Note: A cluster is a group of multiple, independent storms that band together and move as one formation. Due to their individualistic nature, some storms in a cluster can be at different life cycle stages compared to others.) of storms that fired up earlier in the morning near St. Louis. This cluster in the area of moderately strong, elevated instability (Note: Elevated instability occurs when convective available potential energy (CAPE; essentially fuel for storms) sits in a layer at higher altitudes instead of at the surface. Storms may be sustained by air from pressure levels (horizontal slices of the atmosphere at a specific pressure) such as 800–900 hectopascal, rather than from the surface, which may have none.) was associated with the warm advection near the nose of the LLJ. Activity caused by the cluster maintained organization, as the storm cells moved eastward towards the Ohio River region during the afternoon and evening. The retreating surface warm front over the region was expected to aid and focus the convection production. Damaging winds and hail continued to be the main hazards, but, a tornado watch was issued for most of central Missouri and western Illinois due to expectations that the LLJ would help intensify the storms in the afternoon and evening.

Over two hours later at 5:21 PM CDT, (Note: Correlates to 22:21 Coordinated Universal Time.) the SPC issued a mesoscale discussion pertaining information about the atmospheric conditions across the tornado watch area. The environment remained favorable for the development of tornadic supercells, particularly in a region spanning from Jefferson City, Missouri towards St. Louis. Surface winds rotated to the east ahead of the low area and in the wake of earlier convection, where wind shear was more potent and 0–1 km (0.00–0.62 mile) storm-relative helicity values that were in excess of 300 m²/s². Ongoing cells south of Columbia, Missouri at this time showed signs of strong rotation, with the trend increasing as the storms approached the region of greater LLWS to their east. This heightened the threat for isolated and strong tornadoes.

== 2011 tornado summary ==
Warning history
Type	Locations included	Time (CDT)	Reference
Radar indicated	Des Peres, MO; Creve Coeur, MO; Kirkwood, MO; Frontenac, MO; Warson Woods, MO; St. Ann, MO; Oakland, MO; Ladue, MO; Glendale, MO; Olivette, MO; Overland, MO; Woodson Terrace, MO; Hazelwood, MO; Webster Groves, MO; Brentwood, MO; St. John, MO; Berkeley, MO; Richmond Heights, MO; University City, MO; Shrewsbury, MO	7:59 PM	
Radar confirmed	Shrewsbury, MO; Woodson Terrace, MO; Richmond Heights, MO; Maplewood, MO; Clayton, MO; St. John, MO; University City, MO; Hazelwood, MO; Bel-Ridge, MO; Berkeley, MO; Kinloch, MO; Cool Valley, MO; Normandy, MO; Florissant, MO; Hillsdale, MO; Ferguson, MO; Northwoods, MO; Dellwood, MO; St. Louis, MO; Jennings, MO	8:09 PM	
Reported (via tower at St. Louis Lambert International Airport)	Dellwood, MO; Jennings, MO; Black Jack, MO; Bellefontaine Neighbors, MO; Riverview, MO; Spanish Lake, MO; Venice, IL; Madison, IL; Granite City, IL; Washington Park, IL; Pontoon Beach, IL; Edwardsville, IL; Brooklyn, IL; Fairmont City, IL; Hartford, IL; Roxana, IL; Mitchell, IL; Poag, IL	8:16 PM	
Radar confirmed	Venice, IL; Madison, IL; Granite City, IL; Washington Park, IL; Pontoon Beach, IL; Edwardsville, IL; Brooklyn, IL; Fairmont City, IL; Hartford, IL; Mitchell, IL; Poag, IL	8:23 PM	
Radar confirmed (continued)	Granite City, IL; Washington Park, IL; Pontoon Beach, IL; Edwardsville, IL; Fairmont City, IL; Hartford, IL; Mitchell, IL; Poag, IL	8:29 PM	

=== Formation and peak intensity in Bridgeton ===
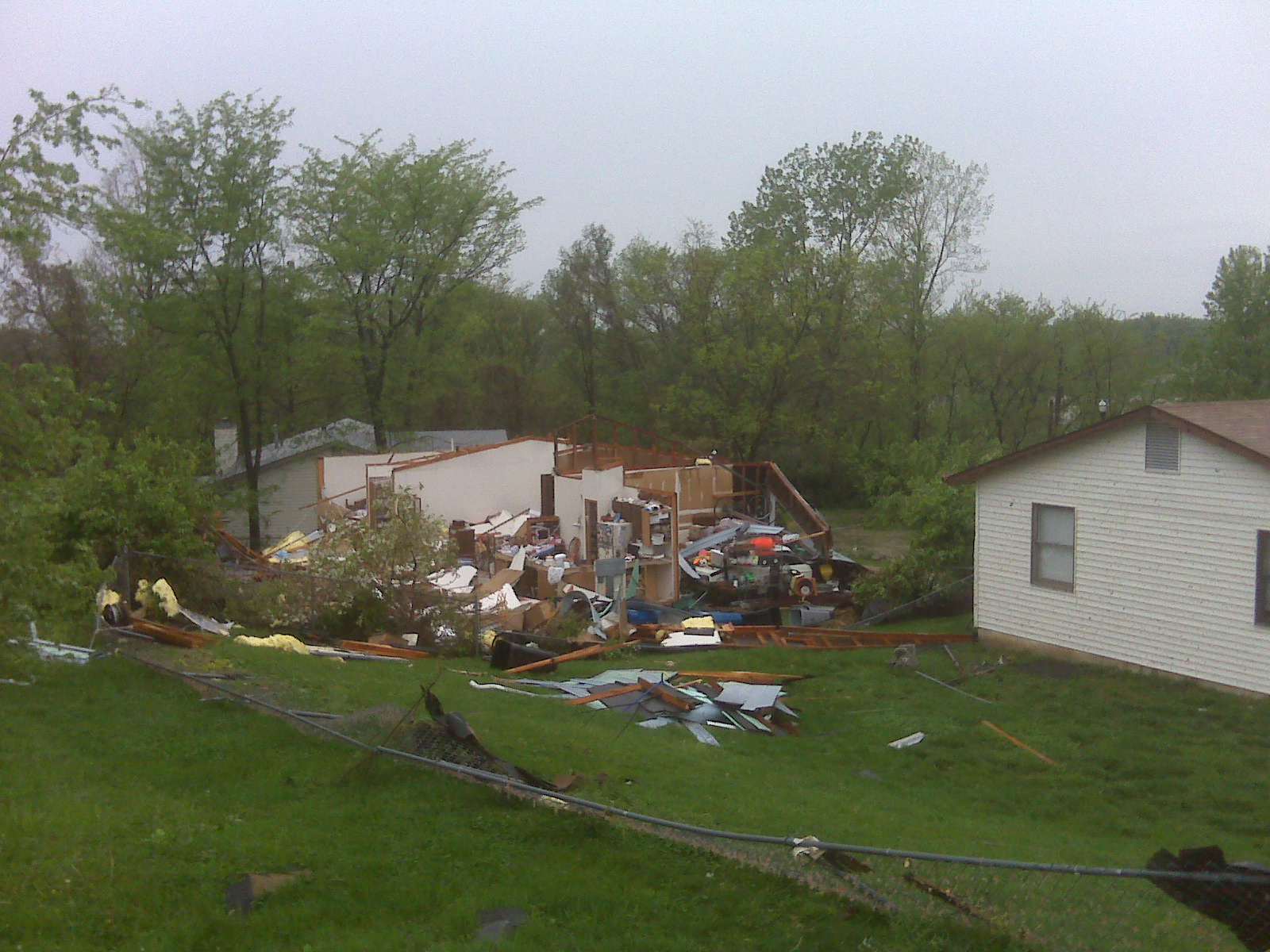
EF3 damage inflicted to a home in Maryland Heights

At 7:59 PM CDT, (Note: Correlates to 00:59 Coordinated Universal Time.) a tornado developed in northern Maryland Heights, Missouri, north of Creve Coeur Lake and east of the Missouri River along Creve Coeur Mill Road. Damage was initially limited to EF0–EF1 level damage to trees along Creve Coeur Mill Road. The tornado began moving east, first reaching EF2 intensity near a golf clubhouse, where a flag pole and light were pushed over. The tornado briefly weakened to EF1 strength before reaching EF3 intensity along Jeannette Mary Drive, where most walls of a house collapsed. EF2 damage was also found in areas around the house, with EF1 damage in the northern part of the neighborhood along the edge of the track. Low-end EF2 damage persisted further east. After crossing Interstate 270, the tornado weakened to EF1 intensity as it impacted more homes on the other side of the highway.

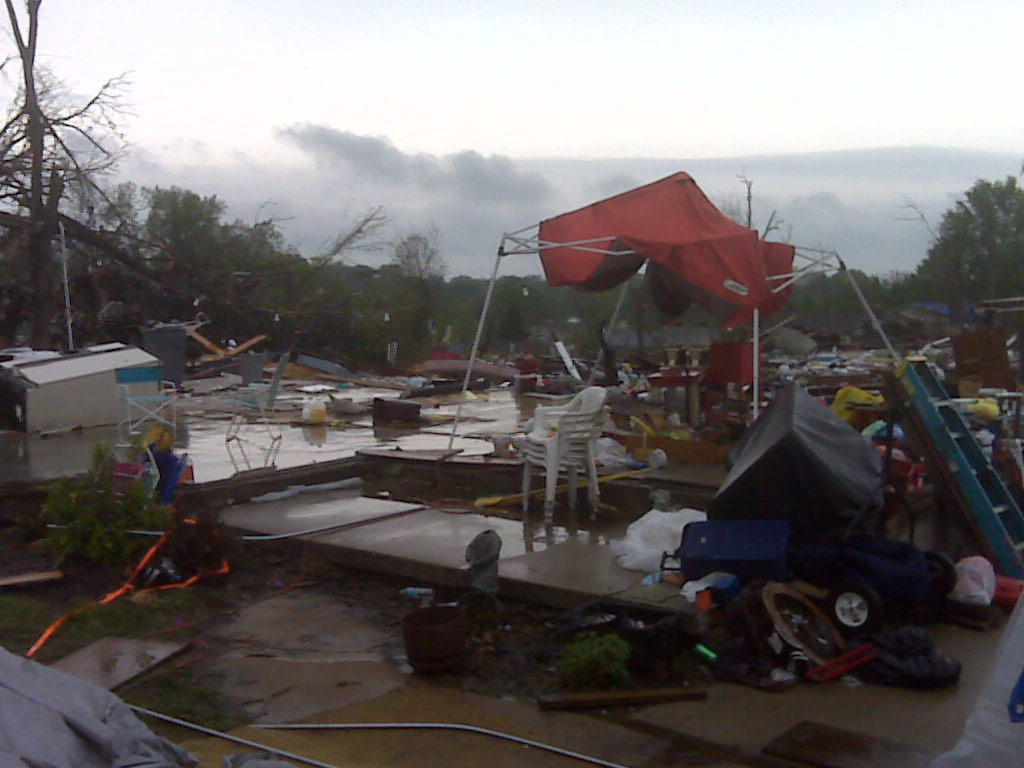
A house that was destroyed at EF4 intensity in Bridgeton

As the tornado moved into the Harmann Estates area of Bridgeton, it reached EF4 intensity along the northern flank of Old St. Charles Road, with a home having all its walls collapsed from estimated wind speeds of 170 miles per hour (270 km/h). Several homes nearby suffered EF3 damage, and trees in the area were debarked and denuded. (Note: See definitions of denuded at Merriam Webster.) A condo in the area was also heavily damaged by the winds, with a large portion of the roof and decking torn off. The tornado then tracked over Beaverton Drive, where several newly constructed homes were destroyed at high-end EF3 strength. The tornado continued through residential areas before crossing Missouri State Route 180, where a large retail building had several walls collapsed. The tornado then tracked over Fee Fee Road, with a power distribution facility on the western side of the street having several exterior walls severely damaged at low-end EF3 intensity.

=== Impact at St. Louis Lambert International Airport ===
CCTV footage inside Concourse C recording the tornado's impact

The tornado weakened to a high-end EF1 as it crossed U.S. Route 67 and Interstate 70, damaging some houses in neighborhoods to the east. The tornado then abruptly strengthened to EF2 intensity, as it turned slightly north upon hitting the eastern section of St. Louis Lambert International Airport around 8:10 PM CDT. (Note: Correlates to 01:10 Coordinated Universal Time.)

The tornado struck the parking garage, damaging over 1,000 vehicles, before hitting Terminal 1 at Concourse C. Over half of the floor-to-ceiling arched windows in Concourse C were destroyed; roughly one-third of the roof was torn off when the tornado struck. Many windows at the airport were blown out, and signs were damaged as well. Vehicles outside were tossed by the tornado, including a van that was partially pushed over the edge of a parking garage. It struck the Concourse C and D security checkpoint, causing minimal damage. The tornado then traveled down the Concourse C corridor. Lambert International Airport released a surveillance video showing debris swirling inside the airport as people ran for cover. About one dozen HVAC units and several concession stands were destroyed. One plane belonging to Southwest Airlines was damaged when wind pushed a baggage conveyor belt into it. American Airlines stated that four planes in its fleet were damaged. Two received significant damage, with one of them hit by 80-mile-per-hour (130 km/h) crosswinds while taxiing in from a landing when the tornado struck. At Concourse A, a Delta Air Lines pilot onboard a McDonnell Douglas MD-88 was preparing for pushback from the gate when the ramp lighting lost power due to the tornado. The MD-88's onboard instruments measured a substantial pressure drop as the tornado passed around 300 yards (270 m) away from the aircraft.

=== Continuation in Missouri and crossing into Illinois ===
The tornado continued at low-end EF2 intensity as it moved into Berkeley, Kinloch and Ferguson, where many homes suffered roof loss. Berkeley High School received minimal damage, although trees and outbuildings were damaged around the edge of the property. Homes on the western edge of Kinloch saw EF2 damage. The tornado narrowly missed the Kinloch City Hall. EF1 tree damage with occasional EF2 damage to structures continued through Kinloch and the eastern part of Berkeley. The tornado then moved just north of the downtown area of Ferguson. A restaurant and church on Blackburn Avenue lost the majority of their roofing, and several windows broke at another church. More low-end EF2 damage was reported to houses northeast of downtown Ferguson. The tornado weakened back to EF1 intensity further east, where light damage was reported at Griffith Elementary School. Afterwards, the tornado passed north of the primary areas of Dellwood, where houses and trees were damaged at EF1 intensity. Some areas of EF2 damage were reported east of Dellwood, including areas where large power poles were snapped. The tornado then continued into the community of Bellefontaine Neighbors, where light to moderate roof damage was reported at several homes. Isolated low-end EF2 damage was found, but most damage was EF1–level in this area. Further east, trees and some homes suffered low-end EF1 damage.

Light tree damage occurred at North Riverfront Park before the tornado crossed the Mississippi River into Illinois. Low-end EF1 damage would occur in areas west of Nameoki Township, with the tornado narrowly missing an industrial park along Illinois State Route 3. The tornado reached EF2 intensity for the last time in areas north of Maryland Place and Pontoon Beach, before weakening to EF0–EF1 strength and dissipating north of Pontoon Road at 8:31 PM CDT. (Note: Correlates to 01:31 Coordinated Universal Time.)

== Analysis of storm surveys ==
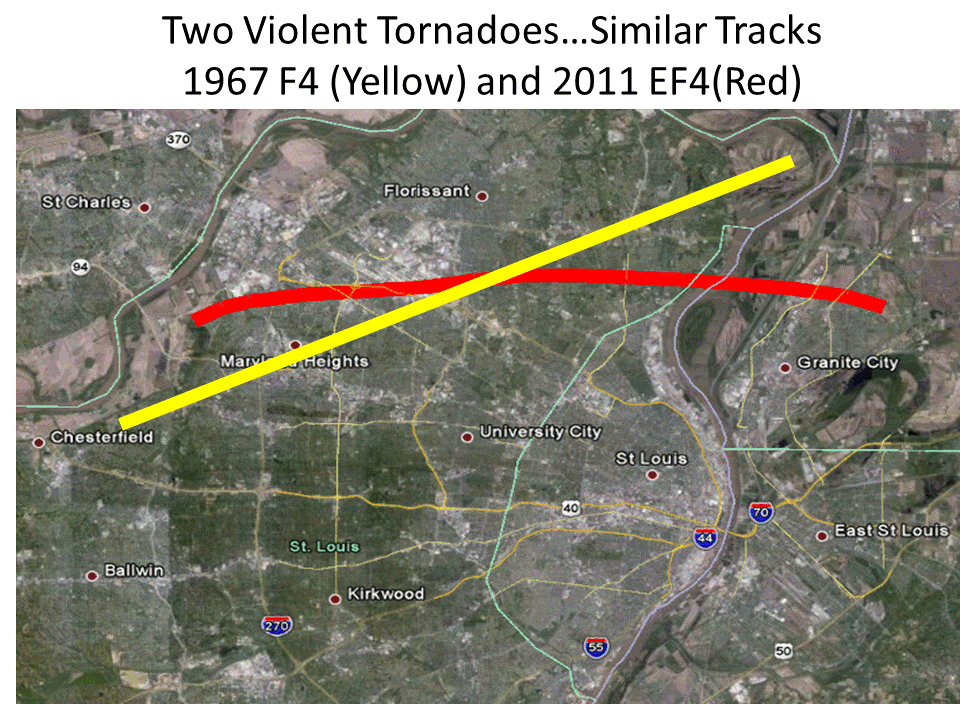
Similar paths set by the 1967 and 2011 tornadoes

The Good Friday EF4 tornado was the highest-rated tornado during the tornado outbreak that lasted from April 19–22, during the highly active and deadly April 2011 tornado season. The tornado was one of two tornadoes rated EF3 or higher during the outbreak, with the other one being an EF3 tornado that occurred in Macoupin County, Illinois on April 19. The 2011 tornado became the strongest to affect St. Louis and surrounding metro in 44 years. The last violent tornado to affect the area was an F4 tornado on January 24, 1967. The city's NWS forecasting office stated that the paths of the 2011 and 1967 tornadoes were very similar to one another. The April 22, 2011 storm was the first violent (EF4+) tornado to strike the state of Missouri since the EF4 tornado in 2008 that struck areas of Newton County. The Good Friday tornado also was the second violent (EF4+) tornado by chronological order to occur during the 2011 season. The first one was an EF4 satellite tornado that took place in Pocahontas County, Iowa, 13 days earlier, on April 9.

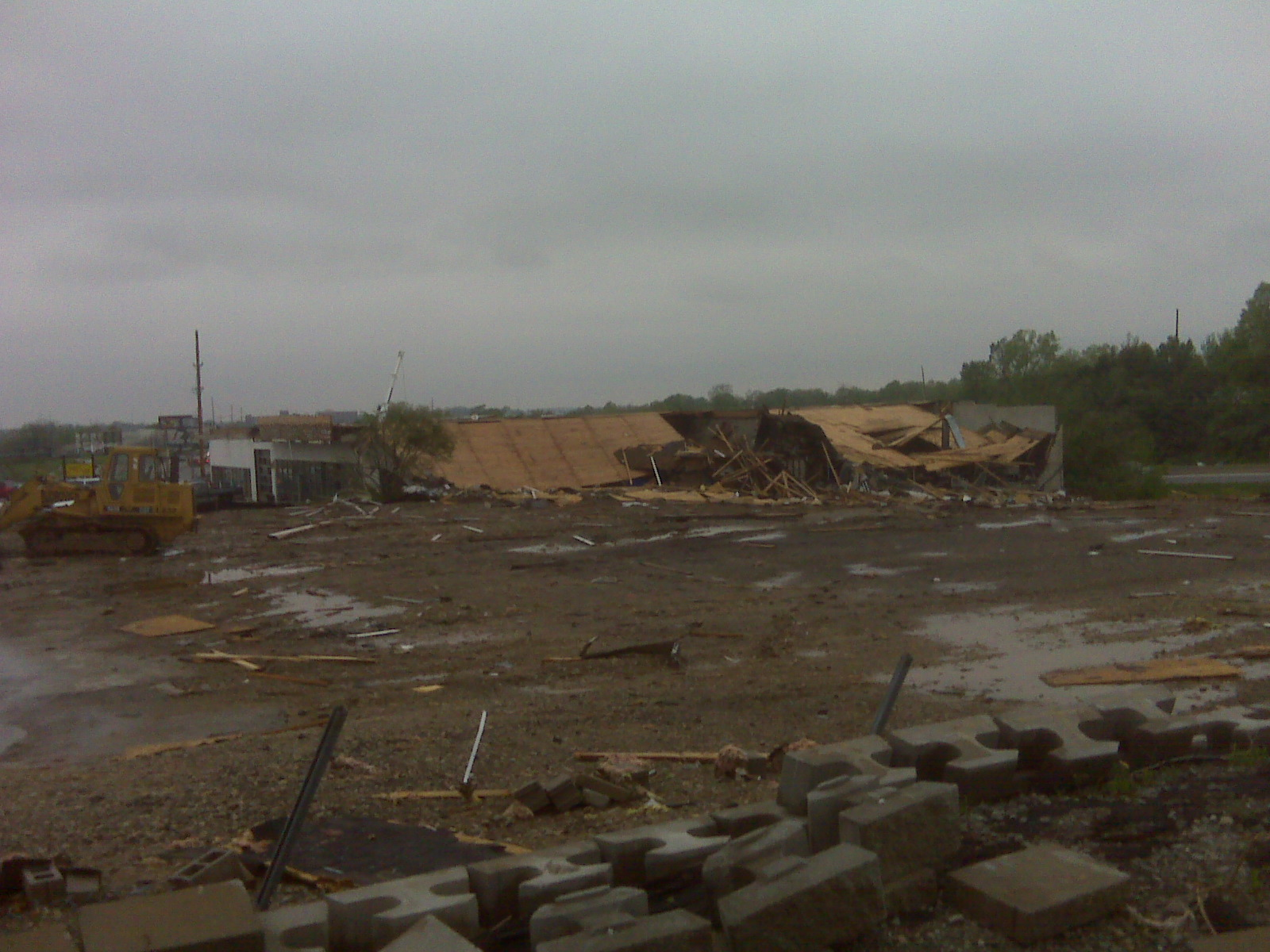
Surveyors rated this destroyed retailer as EF3 on the Enhanced Fujita scale, with estimated winds of 140 miles per hour (230 km/h)

On Saturday, the day after the tornado, NWS teams from the regional weather forecasting office surveyed the damage across portions of northern St. Louis. By 11:45 AM CDT (Note: Correlates to 16:45 Coordinated Universal Time.) on April 23, one of the four assessment teams noted that at least EF3 damage had been inflicted in parts of the northern suburbs. At around 2:00 PM CDT, (Note: Correlates to 19:00 Coordinated Universal Time.) damage surveyors from the NWS St. Louis, Missouri office reported EF2 damage near Pontoon Beach, along a 100-yard (91 m) wide swath from Levee Road south of I-270.

It was not until 3:05 PM CDT (Note: Correlates to 20:05 Coordinated Universal Time.) on April 23, that an NWS survey team discovered the first instances of EF4 damage in the Bridgeton area near Old St. Charles Rock Road and Harmann Estates. This was before other assessment teams were able to reach Lambert International Airport. After 6:00 PM CDT, (Note: Correlates to 23:00 Coordinated Universal Time.) NWS teams descended on the international airport. During the assessments, it was concluded that the highest rated damage at the airport was of EF2 intensity. Almost 80% of the windows in the easternmost section of the impacted terminal were compromised. Concourse C had its roof torn off by the storm.

On the early morning of Sunday, April 24, 2011, the NWS released a public information statement regarding the Good Friday tornado that tracked across St. Louis and Madison counties, across both Missouri and Illinois. The EF4 tornado traveled for 22 miles (35 km) and had a width of 0.4 miles (640 m). Later in 2011, more adjustments were made. The finalized report by the National Centers for Environmental Information concluded that the tornado traveled a distance of 21.3 miles (34.3 km), and was 880 yards (0.50 mi; 800 m) wide at its largest. The highest-rated damage in Missouri, according to reports, at EF4–level, while in Illinois it was EF2. Winds were assessed at 170 miles per hour (270 km/h) based on the destruction of a house along Old St. Charles Road, in Bridgeton.

== Regional impact ==
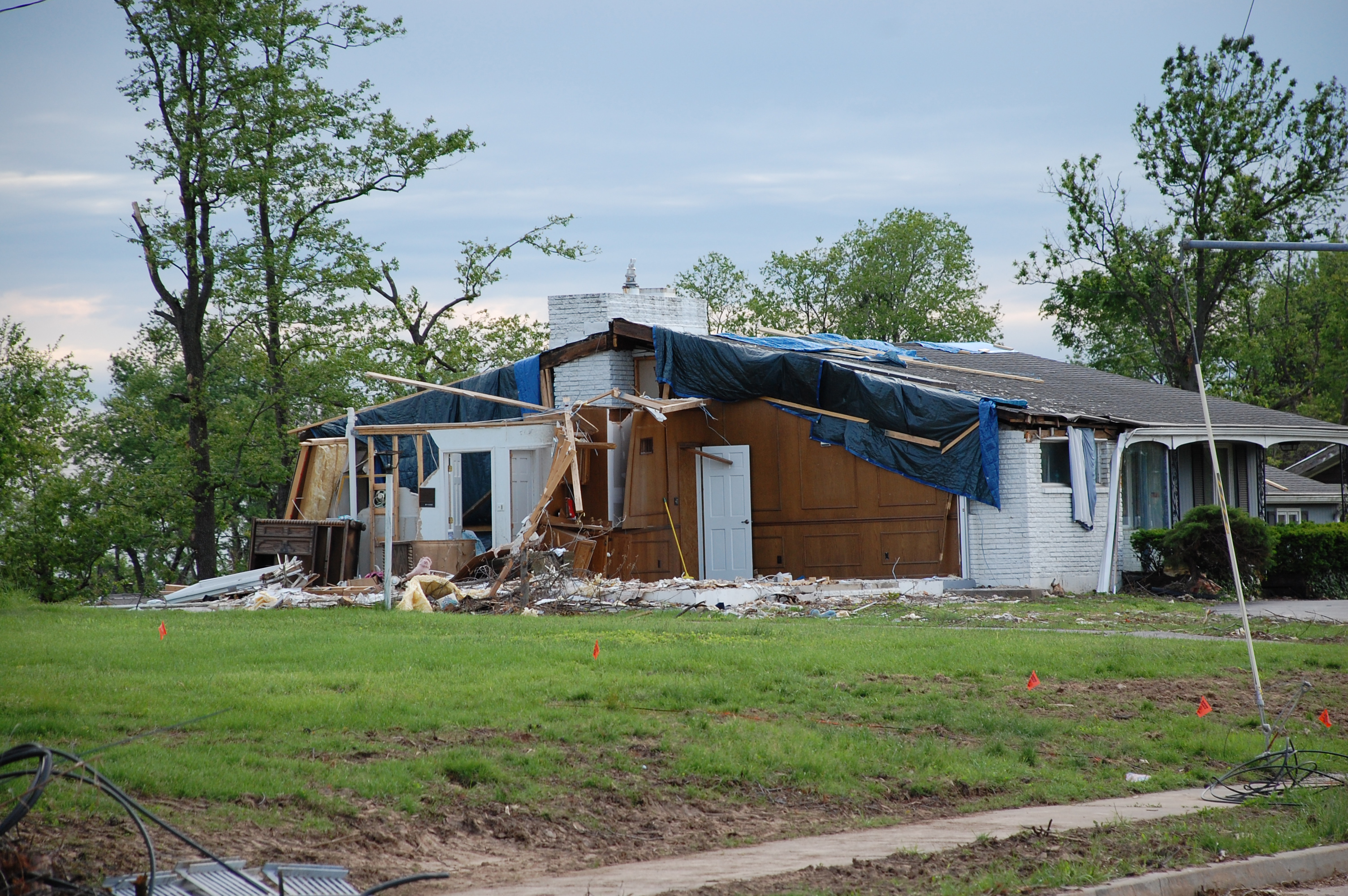
Many homes were damaged by the storm, including this one shown here in Bridgeton

Per the St. Louis Public Radio, in the St. Louis metropolitan area, the American Red Cross (ARC) set up base right after the tornado on Saturday, April 23, 2011 at 12:30 AM CDT. (Note: Correlates to 05:30 Coordinated Universal Time.) The ARC opened shelters at the Maryland Heights Community Center and McCluer High School in Florissant, Missouri. An ARC spokeswoman told the press that no additional emergency shelters were needed, but the organization remained on standby to open more if needed.

Ameren reported 43,000 customers losing power at 9:10 PM CDT (Note: Correlates to 02:10 Coordinated Universal Time.) on Friday night. The Associated Press (AP) reported 2,400 homes lost power in the Metro East area in Illinois, and less than 50 homes remained de-energized the next day. The Madison County Sheriff told AP that more than 100 houses were damaged in the region, though no injuries were reported.

According to the local NWS office and the St. Louis Post-Dispatch, the tornado damaged approximately 2,700 structures across the St. Louis metro. These were made up of hundreds of buildings, in which 251 homes which were heavily damaged or destroyed, and 137 commercial buildings suffered large damage or total destruction. These losses were upwards into the $250 million range.

=== Airport ===
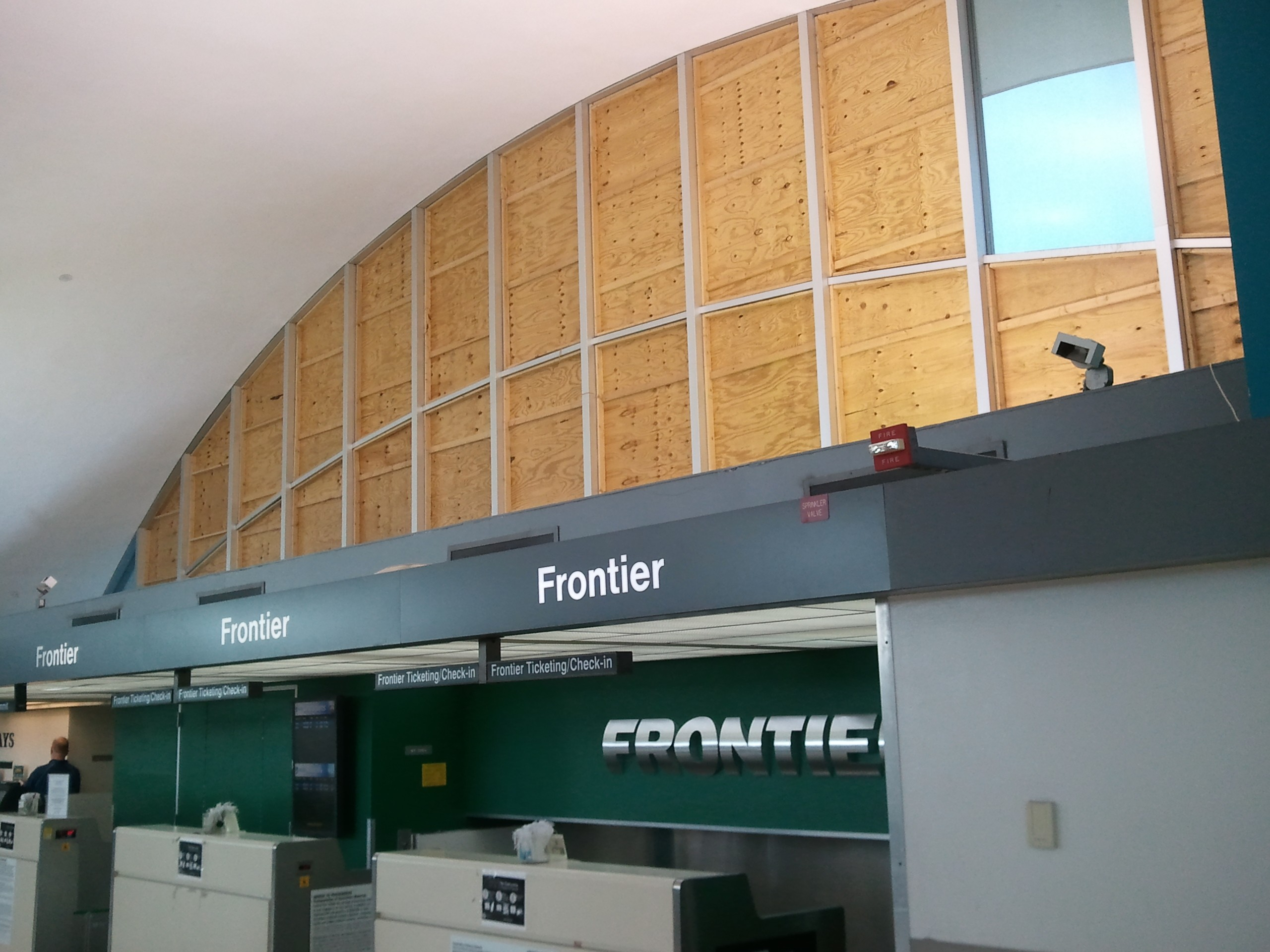
Windows boarded up at St. Louis's airport after the tornado

St. Louis Lambert International Airport was heavily impacted by the tornado on Good Friday, with the storm inflicting in between $25–30 million in damages. Lambert International Airport was closed for 24 hours by the FAA following the tornado. Marilee McInnis, a Southwest Airlines spokeswoman stated the airline (Note: Southwest Airlines is the largest carrier at Lambert International Airport.) canceled flights out of the airport through 4:00 PM CDT (Note: Correlates to 21:00 Coordinated Universal Time.) on April 23. Prior to the tornado, Southwest Airlines used to have approximately 85 daily flights at the regional hub. American Airlines, which operated heavily out of the main terminal, reported that four airplanes from their fleet were damaged, including two that received significant damage. The tornado struck the Concourse C building when officials were 20% completed with an airport improvement project. The main terminal's domed structure, designed by architect Minoru Yamasaki, was also damaged during the storm.

Five people within the airport were hospitalized after being struck with flying debris. Hundreds of passengers experienced delayed flights, and a dozen passengers in the terminal impacted by the tornado were given pillows and blankets. All of them had left by the following Saturday morning. Despite the tornado impacting the airport, the situation could have been worse had the tornado not occurred during the night, which is a less busier period, according the Lambert International Airport director Rhonda Hamm-Niebruegge.

The tornado also struck the nearby Missouri Air National Guard base at the airport. A U.S. Air Force colonel of the 131st Mission Support Group reported that sixteen out of 25 buildings sustained some form of damage, mainly to the more recently built structures. The storm also caused power outages and disrupted communications. The worst of the destruction was to the southern buildings of the 46-acre (19 ha) facility, which caused 75% of staff to relocate to the northern extent of the base. The total estimated losses the tornado inflicted to the Air National Guard site was over $10 million.

== Aftermath ==
=== State and federal responses ===
Late on April 22, Missouri governor Jay Nixon issued a state of emergency for the region, allowing state agencies to assist local jurisdictions affected by the tornado. On April 27, FEMA representatives arrived in St. Louis to assess the damage. FEMA teams collected information on a diverse scale of factors. This included the number of displaced residents, effects on the local economy, and how much property was uninsured. Two days later on April 29, U.S. Secretary of Homeland Security Janet Napolitano traveled to St. Louis to tour the damage at Lambert International Airport, joining up with FEMA and the Transportation Security Administration.

In early May 2011, President Barack Obama signed a disaster declaration for Missouri, following tornadoes, severe weather, and flooding events that began on April 19. FEMA granted individuals across Butler, Mississippi, New Madrid, Taney, and St. Louis counties access to assistance and federal funding on a cost-sharing basis for hazard mitigation measures. This included temporary housing and home repairs.

=== Recovery efforts ===
==== St. Louis region ====
Ameren reported 7,200 of its Missouri customers had no power on Monday, April 25. This figure was less than 0.5% of the company's 1.2 million consumers. The company reassured its Missouri customers without power that it will be restored by the end of Monday. Ameren reported that power was returned to all customers by April 26.

Reconstruction and debris cleanup in St. Louis, Missouri, was rapid, as cleanup efforts "swung into full gear" by the following Saturday. Homeowners sifted through the wreckage of their homes, while others brought repair kits, such as chainsaws and hammers, to begin rebuilding damaged houses. One Bridgeton resident compared the aftermath to something out of a movie. Governor Nixon called it a "little bit of divine intervention" while he flew over the recovering areas to survey the damage.

==== Christian organizations ====
The tornado took place on Good Friday, a Christian holy day commemorating the crucifixion of Jesus Christ. In its wake, the tornado impacted the First Baptist Church in Ferguson, an academic institute of the Missouri Baptist Convention (MBC), causing $1 million in losses. In the same area, dozens of Ferguson Christian Church members participated in a movie night to watch The Passion of the Christ, when the tornado suddenly tore through the congregation and destroyed the church's sanctuary above the attendees, as they took cover. In Bridgeton, the tornado also caused light damage to the Missouri Baptist Children's Home (MBCH). Fee Fee Baptist Church, located nearby MBCH, also suffered minor damage. Members of Zion Lutheran Church in Maryland Heights took shelter during their worship, with the tornado inflicting damage to the church.

After the tornado, several Christian-based organizations were deployed in the St. Louis metropolitan area to aid affected victims. MBC teams arrived to St. Louis as cleanup efforts continued. The organization consisted of 85 volunteers, who helped out debris removal and fallen tree cleanups. At the parking lot of Fee Fee Baptist Church, the Southern Baptist Disaster Relief set up a command post on April 25. The post was supposed to be set up at St. Louis Metro Baptist Association; however, it was not due to a prolonged power outage. St. Louis members of the Lutheran Church – Missouri Synod (LCMS) denomination were impacted during the Good Friday tornado, but helped communities by reaching out to them. The LMCS World Relief and Human Care (WRCH) director granted a pastor a WRCH disaster grant for his church, supporting families that needed immediate help. The pastor of Zion Lutheran Church visited the damaged areas and spoke with the congregation's members and their neighbors, noting that no deaths had occurred.

==== Lambert International Airport ====
Projects began the day after the tornado, on April 23, 2011. About 1,000 workers were deployed to St. Louis Lambert International Airport to support recovery efforts. The crew boarded up windows, fixed damaged roofs, and cleared debris away. Terminal 1 remained closed at this time, while the airport was expected to operate at 70% capacity. Flights also resumed that day as well for the airport, according to airport spokesman Jeff Lea to Reuters. Airport staff spent the day boarding up windows, patching roof holes, and removing debris. Broken glass was being cleared out at Terminal 1, where Concourse C was located. Lea mentioned that the cleanup and repair jobs would not make the terminal look aesthetically pleasing, but at least have it run as intended. Airlines and concessions relocated operations to concourses B and D. Concourse C fully reopened on April 2, 2012.

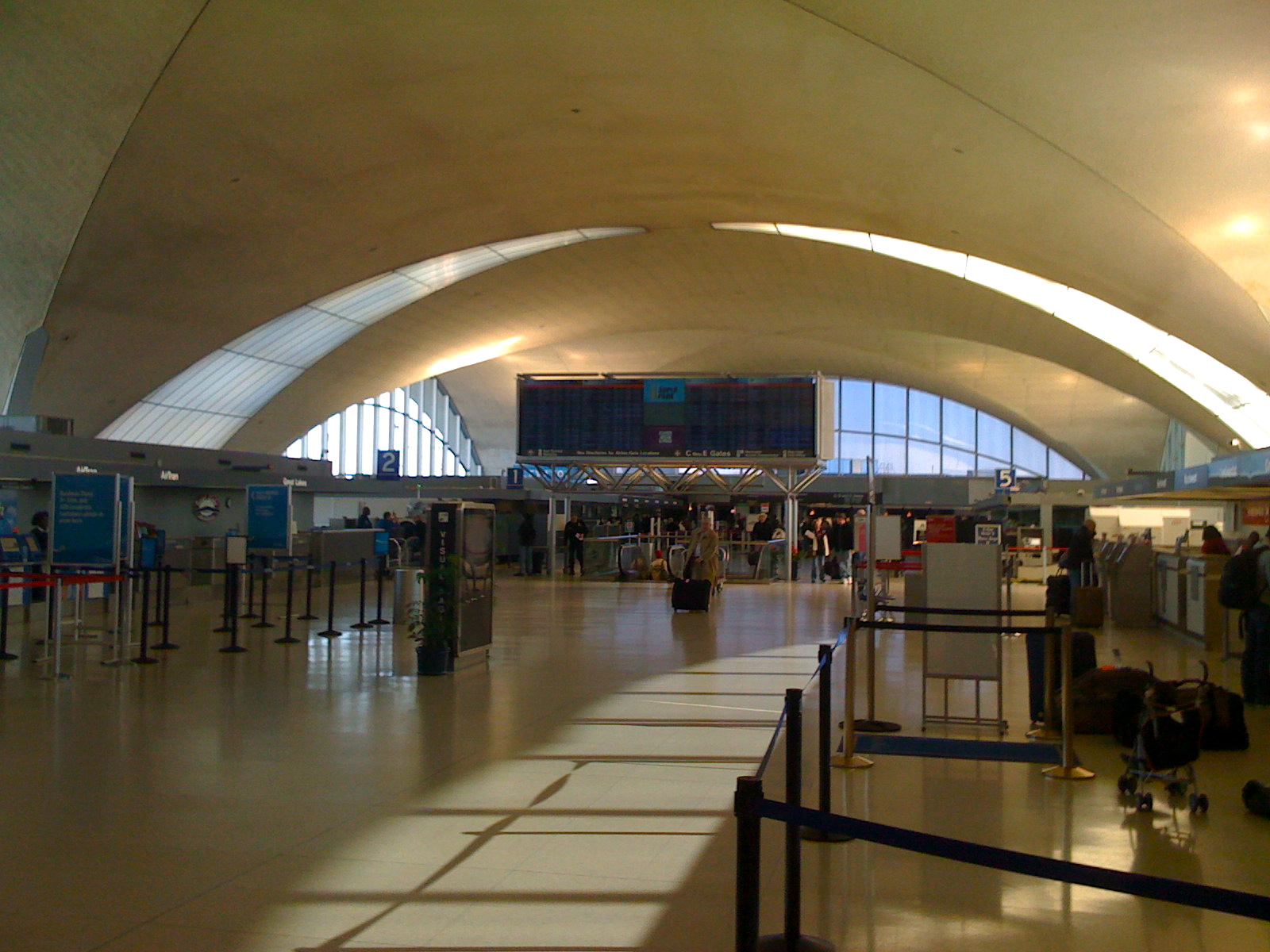
Before photo of the main terminal, taken in 2009

Within 48 hours of the event on April 24, engineers from the Thornton Tomasetti consulting firm arrived at the hub to conduct a comprehensive damage assessment. The engineers helped assess the structural integrity of the airport through multiple teams. Due to the diverse nature of the damage the tornado inflicted, the firm used their mechanical, electrical, plumbing, fire protection, architectural and structural engineering teams to work on the reconstruction of Lambert International Airport. In the spring of 2012, the airport was fully operational again. The floor-to-ceiling window arches were replaced with laminated glass to conform to new building standards.

In February 2012, the NOAA released a report on the poor response and failure of tornado safety preparations by the airport. The NOAA report stated that "preparedness activities and action plan procedures for the Lambert St. Louis International Airport were minimal and in-effective for this event." The NOAA also mentioned that not only was there a lack of warning issued by airport authorities, but also that there were no alerts from airlines about the threat of the tornado. Lambert International Airport's operations center was completely unaware of the tornado, despite the NWS having warned a confirmed, damaging tornado 34 minutes earlier. Rhonda Hamm-Niebruegge, the airport director, did not agree with the critique handed out by the NOAA, finding the report "extreme" after hearing that the airport was inadequate in its measures. Hamm-Niebruegge defended her staff by stating the tornado came up rapidly with ample time to react, however, she did acknowledge that the operations center failed to make an announcement to the passengers over the public address system. By August 2012 and more than a decade after the Good Friday tornado, St. Louis Lambert International Airport has built up to become the first official "storm ready" international airport in the United States, with a grown partnership between the airport's organization and the NWS. A new second, underground operations center was constructed for severe weather events. Weather radios were installed, and airport personnel received new forms of training in case of another similar disaster in the future.

=== DFW International Airport incident ===
On April 3, 2012, a localized and damaging tornado outbreak struck the Dallas–Fort Worth metroplex region, in Texas. At Dallas–Fort Worth International Airport, the eighth busiest airport globally at the time, a tornadic supercell that showed signs of strengthening began approaching the airport. Officials at DFW International Airport properly warned passengers of the approaching danger and managed to get people in the concourses to safety into interior structures and storm shelters, however, failed to alert airline pilots about the incoming storm. Through radar, there were clear signs that a strong thunderstorm with a possible tornado was moving towards the airport, along with tornado warnings and a tornado emergency being issued for the area seventeen minutes earlier, according to NWS officials. Despite all these precautions, pilots on onboard planes loaded with passengers on the taxiways at DFW International Airport, remained oblivious to the potential tornado threat and were caught off guard as the storm struck. The supercell proceeded to pass over the hub, never producing any tornado but dropping golf ball-sized hail that damaged over a hundred aircraft, causing a significant amount of flight delays and cancellations. One unaware American Airlines pilot assumed that the supercell at first was an ordinary spring-time thunderstorm, before his plane was pushed away from the gate by strong winds and the event becoming "the worst thing" he had lived through.

No fatalities occurred during this incident, however, it sparked a situation that was similar to what happened at Lambert International Airport almost a year earlier. The 2011 St. Louis tornado was supposed to be a warning to the aviation and severe weather communities about the danger of tornadic storms at major airports. Airline pilots at both international airports in St. Louis and Dallas–Fort Worth failed to receive warnings from airport personnel, showing that there was no progress being made on what pilots were supposed to do during tornadic storms, months after the Good Friday tornado. A senior vice president at AccuWeather in Wichita, Kansas criticized the aviation industry, stating that they only do something once a deadly accident happens.

=== Long-term recovery ===
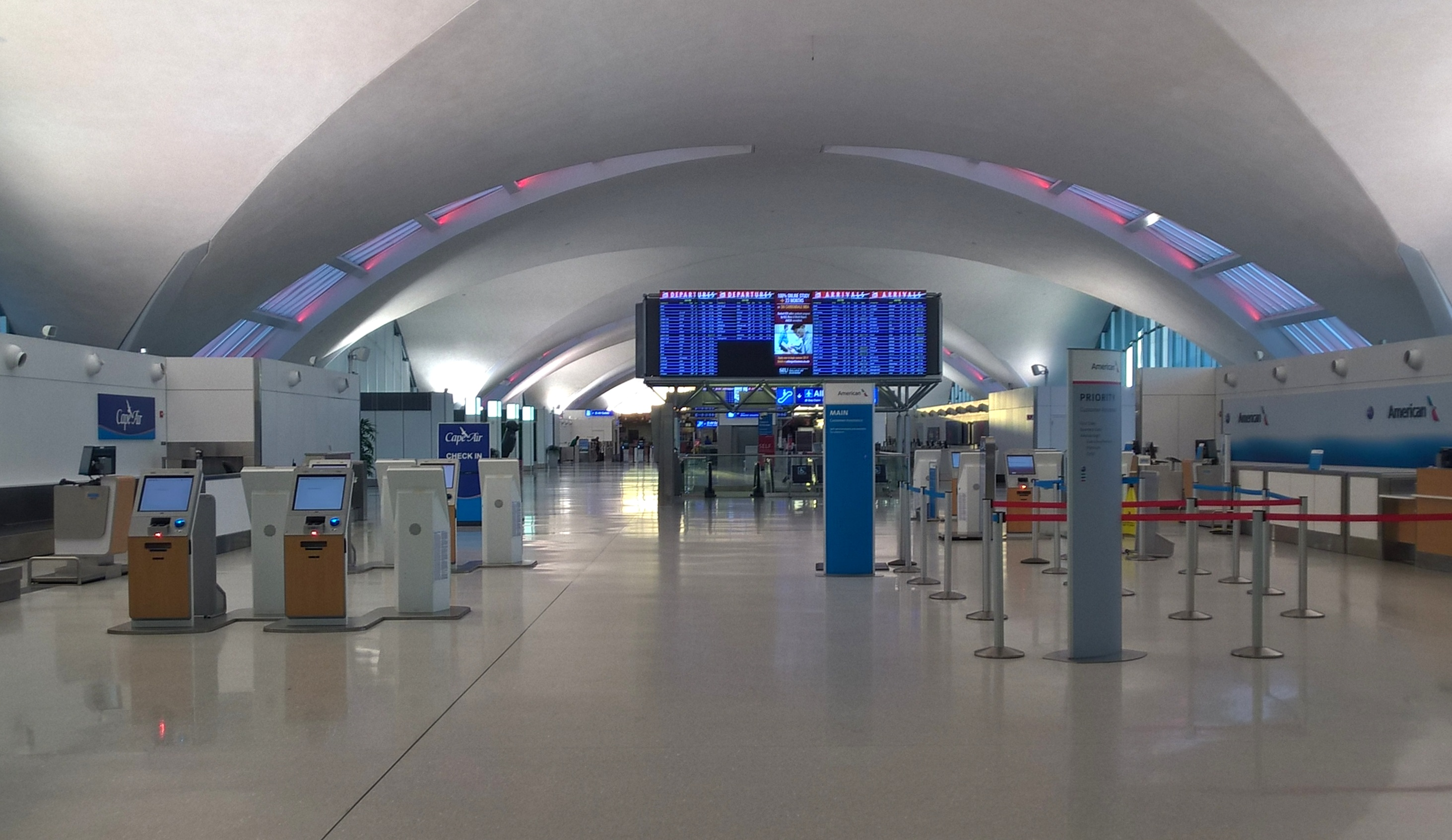
Terminal 1 departures hall in 2017 after renovation

In April 2012, U.S. congressman Lacy Clay revisited the St. Louis Lambert International Airport, commending the remission process the last time he arrived over just after the tornado in 2011. In his initial visit, Clay recalled witnessing the immediate wake hours after the tornado impacted the airport. In the wider St. Louis metropolitan area, in the 10 years since the 2011 Good Friday tornado, the most heavily affected homes in neighborhoods such as Bridgeton were fully rebuilt. The early warning issued by the NWS and media outlets and that there were no fatalities and minor injuries continued to be notable remarks for the recovered communities.

=== Legacy in media ===
==== Storm Chasers ====
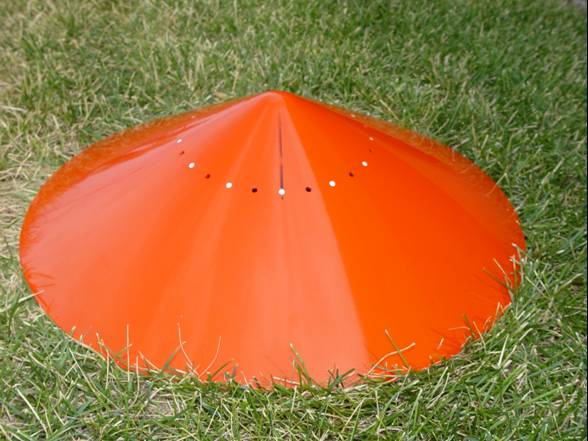
The Hardened In-situ Tornado Pressure Recorders (HITPR) probe used by TWISTEX for their research deployments

The Good Friday tornado was featured on October 2, 2011, on the second episode of the fifth season of the Discovery Channel documentary reality television series Storm Chasers. In the episode, titled Storms Over St. Louis, storm chaser Reed Timmer and his chase partners at Team Dominator, along with their rivals Tim Samaras and the TWISTEX crew, were en route to St. Louis to get ahead of initiating storms. Team Dominator made several major mistakes, leading them to be wrongly positioned and away from their target. TWISTEX, however, managed to follow the supercell that eventually produced the EF4 tornado. The crew attempted to place a scientific probe in the path of the tornado after dark. They, however, ended up getting too close to the circulation for their instrument deployment. Samaras and his partners eventually came across impacted motorists and the damage the tornado left behind.

==== Witness: Tornado Swarm 2011 ====
The St. Louis EF4 tornado also was aired on the National Geographic documentary film Witness: Tornado Swarm 2011, produced by Siskel/Jacobs Productions. The film showcases raw footage of the events and aftermaths of April 2011's tornado season, captured by both professional and amateur videographers who were at the scene of these events. In one segment of the documentary, focusing on the April 22 tornado, numerous videos were taken at St. Louis Lambert International Airport. These videos mainly came from passengers who were stranded at the airport, unaware of the approaching storm. They then eventually videotaped the tornado's impact while continuing to record the destruction, and later the outcome.

== See also ==
- Weather of 2011
- List of North American tornadoes and tornado outbreaks
- Tornado intensity
- List of United States tornadoes in April 2011
- List of tornadoes in the outbreak and derecho of April 19–22, 2011
- List of F4, EF4, and IF4 tornadoes
  - List of F4 and EF4 tornadoes (2010–2019)
- 2009 Murfreesboro tornado – A deadly EF4 tornado that struck the city of Murfreesboro, Tennessee, which also took place on Good Friday
- 2011 Joplin tornado – A far more destructive and violent EF5 tornado that occurred exactly a month after in Joplin, Missouri, becoming the second violent tornado in the state in 2011 and the costliest tornado in recorded history
- 2019 Linwood tornado – Another violent and rainwrapped EF4 tornado that struck the western Kansas City metropolitan area across parts of Kansas
- 2025 St. Louis tornado – A deadly and extremely costly EF3 tornado that impacted the central and suburban areas of St. Louis
