= Tornado outbreak and derecho of April 19–22, 2011 =

April 2011 tornado outbreak and wind storm event

- Clockwise from the top: Map of confirmed tornadoes, severe thunderstorm warnings, and tornado warnings during the event, NEXRAD reflectivity loop of the April 19–20 derecho, damage seen inside of St. Louis Lambert International Airport after a tornado on April 22

Meteorological history
- Duration: April 19–22, 2011

Tornado outbreak
- Tornadoes: 110
- Max. rating: EF4 tornado
- Duration: 3 days, 7 hours, 28 minutes
- Highest winds: Tornadic – 170 mph (270 km/h) (EF4 in Greater St. Louis, Missouri on April 22)
- Highest gusts: Non-tornadic – 104 kn (120 mph; 193 km/h) (In Hamilton and White Counties, Illinois on April 19)
- Largest hail: 4.50 in (11.4 cm): Ozark County, Missouri on April 19; Kimble County, Texas on April 20; Warren County, Missouri on April 22

Overall effects
- Fatalities: 0
- Injuries: 24
- Damage: $298.515 million (Note: The aforementioned damage totals are in 2011 United States dollars.) (≥$684,350,000 in 2025 USD)
- Areas affected: Central and Eastern regions of the United States
- Part of the tornado outbreaks of 2011

From April 19–22, 2011, a major tornado outbreak and associated derecho affected portions of the central and southern United States. During the outbreak, a total of 110 tornadoes were confirmed as the storm system moved from the Great Plains region toward the Eastern United States. On April 19, numerous tornadoes took place across areas primarily north of the Ohio River, with several strong (Note: Per the National Weather Service and the Enhanced Fujita scale: EF0–EF1 tornadoes are weak; EF2–EF3 tornadoes are strong; EF4–EF5 tornadoes are violent) tornadoes touching down in Illinois, Indiana, and Ohio. An EF3 tornado damaged or destroyed numerous homesteads and farmhouses near Girard, Illinois, injuring two people, and an EF2 tornado struck areas in between Honey Bend and Litchfield. Multiple tornadoes, some strong, also struck portions of Indiana and Ohio. Later that day, a long-lived mesoscale convective system (MCS) tracked from the Great Lakes to the Deep South, inflicting significant damage and injuring two people in Alabama after trees were knocked down and fell onto their homes.

During the early morning hours of April 20, several tornadoes touched down east of the Mississippi River, the strongest being an EF2 tornado that struck the Licking County city of Heath, Ohio, damaging several homes and businesses. On April 21, a sporadic tornado event took place in western Texas, with an EF2 tornado destroying a house and barn just to the north of Sanderson, and EF0–EF1 tornadoes touching down in Jones and Pecos Counties.

The final day of the outbreak, on Good Friday, April 22, another regional tornado outbreak occurred from Oklahoma to Indiana. In Kentucky, an EF2 tornado impacted parts of Poole. Two additional EF2 tornadoes also occurred near Highland and Waterloo, Illinois. In Missouri, an EF4 tornado touched down in Maryland Heights after dusk. This tornado tracked through the northern suburbs of the St. Louis metropolitan area, inflicting major damage to neighborhoods and businesses. The tornado reached peak intensity in Bridgeton with estimated winds of 170 mph (270 km/h). Eventually the tornado struck St. Louis Lambert International Airport, inflicting major damage to the terminal 1 and concourse C buildings, and five people were injured. This was the strongest and costliest tornado of the outbreak, causing $250 million in losses.

The severe weather outbreak between April 19 and 22 caused 24 injuries yet no fatalities. This tornado outbreak was among the many multi-day weather events to have taken place during the destructive April 2011 season. The April 22 tornado that struck the St. Louis metropolitan region was the second EF4 tornado to have taken place in the U.S. in 2011.

== Meteorological synopsis ==
The Storm Prediction Center (SPC) in Norman, Oklahoma highlighted an upcoming weather event earlier in advance, on April 13. Despite this, there were uncertainties with the ECMWF weather model, (Note: The ECMWF's Integrated Forecasting System (IFS) is a European numerical weather prediction system that has seen use across most of Europe and other parts of the world.) as it showed the upcoming storm system being further west than predicted. An upper-level trough was set to sweep into the central United States, initiating severe weather across the regional states on Tuesday, April 19.

NOAA Storm Prediction Center convective outlooks on April 22, 2011 (Note: The "z" timestamp indicators refer to Zulu military time zones, named after the NATO phonetic alphabet. Zulu time zones are equal to Universal Coordinated Time.)

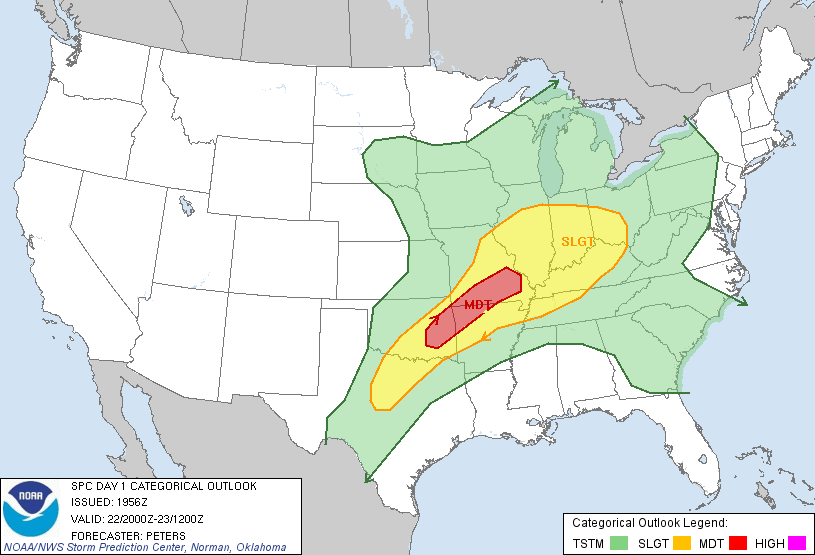
Day 1 2000z categorical outlooks

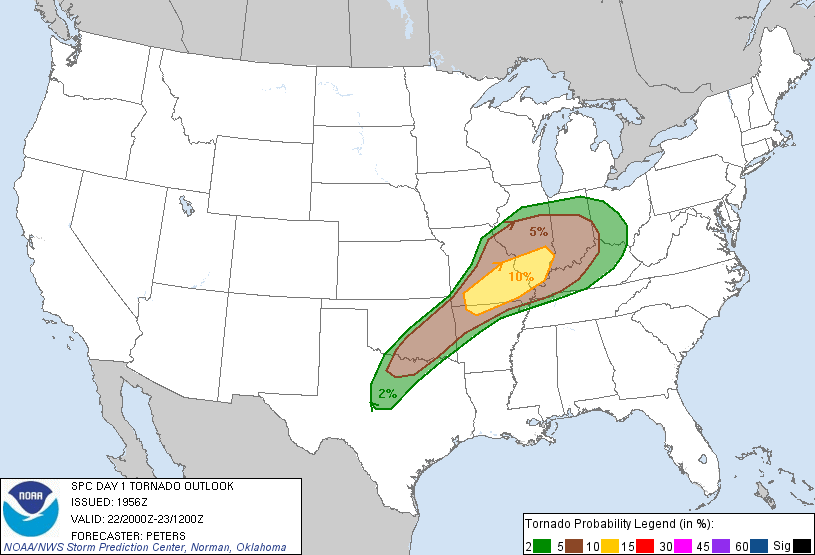
Day 1 2000z tornado outlooks

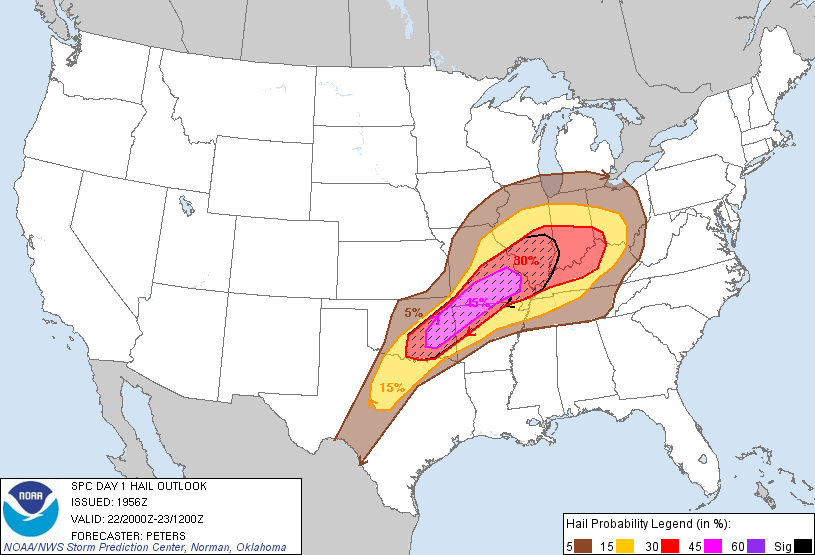
Day 1 2000z hail outlooks

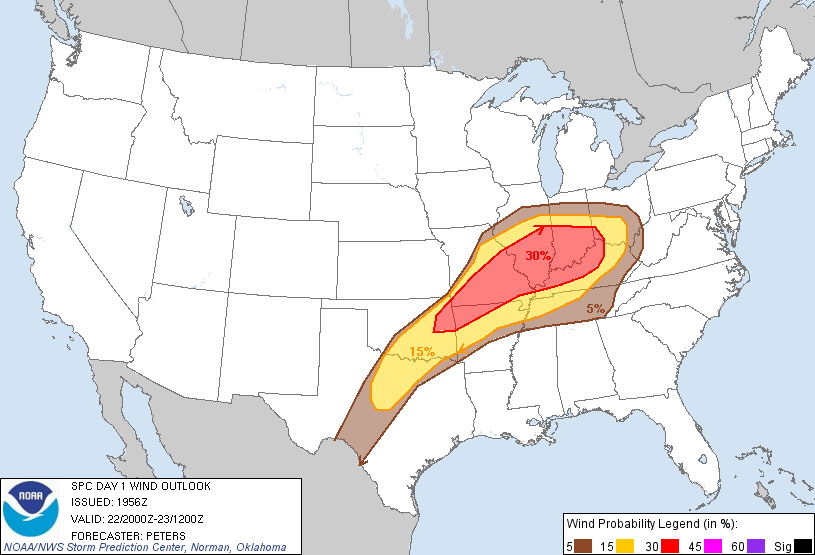
Day 1 2000z wind outlooks

=== April 19 ===
At around 1:00 AM CDT (06:00 UTC) on Tuesday, April 19, the SPC issued a large moderate risk that sat in a region from eastern Oklahoma to extreme western Ohio. Hours later, past 4:30 AM CDT (09:30 UTC), a Public Severe Weather Outlook (PWO) was issued by the SPC for portions of the Ozark Highlands, Mississippi River, and Ohio River Valleys. Severe thunderstorms were expected to persist throughout the day. A strong disturbance in the jet stream over the southern Rocky Mountains was forecasted to move east into the southern Great Plains, before heading northeast towards the middle-Mississippi and lower-Ohio River Valleys during the night hours of Tuesday, and Wednesday, April 20. Around the same time during the morning hours, an accompanying surface low-pressure area and cold front was expected to move from southeastern Kansas to northern Ohio during the dawn of April 20. Ahead of the low area, a broad stream of warm winds moved northward into the western south-central states, strengthening and bringing moisture that soon spread over to the east-northeast. Day time surface heating destabilized the region under risk even further, increasing the chances for strong thunderstorms ahead of the cold front and surface low, during the afternoon and evening hours. Conditions for severe weather at first, were suitable for the production of individual supercell development, with tornadoes, hail, and damaging winds possible. However, later into the day, there was a likelihood that the storms would merge into a cluster or a band, giving way to a more widespread wind event.

Preliminary severe weather reports on April 19 across the central U.S.

During the afternoon hours, before 3:00 PM CDT (20:00 UTC), no further enhancements were made by the SPC for the main risk area, with the last edits done at around 11:30 AM CDT (16:30 UTC). A short-wave trough over the central to southern High Plains persisted northeastward. In the lower levels of the atmosphere, the attending surface low area to the storm system in west-central Missouri was to take place north of St. Louis by 2:00–4:00 PM CDT (19:00–21:00 UTC), and the Illinois/Indiana border region by 3:00–10:00 PM CDT (20:00–03:00 UTC). Preceding the surface low, a warm front subsequently lifted northwestward along the Great Lakes region, while the trailing cold front extended from central Illinois to southeastern Oklahoma, serving the main focus for potent severe weather. Steep lapse rates resided over a broad, moist warm sector, (Note: Warm and cold sectors, refer to two regions of air masses that trail alongside cold and warm fronts.: A warm sector usually sits in between the cold and warm fronts, with these traditionally oriented west and north of the warm air mass. This is where the warmest air is to be found within a weather system.; A cold sector sits just west of the cold front, with the region seeing much cooler temperatures due to colder winds coming from the north. This is parallel to the warm sector, which receives warmer air from the south.) while dew points in the boundary layer reached into the 60° Fahrenheit (16° Celsius) range. A capping inversion at the base of the elevated mixed layer (EML) (Note: An EML is a layer of mid-tropospheric air that originates over the arid, elevated terrain. Because of their origin, EMLs exhibit sharp decreases in temperature with height. The large vertical temperature differentials (or "steep" lapse rates) in EMLs are analogous to those observed over black-topped roofs and parking lots on sunny days. Such thermal stratification encourages the formation of strong updrafts that can lead to the development of thunderstorms.) delayed surface-based thunderstorm development from initiating too early. Mixed layer convective available potential energy (MLCAPE) (Note: MLCAPE is a measure of instability in the troposphere. This value represents the mean potential energy conditions available to parcels of air located in the lowest 100-mb when lifted to the level of free convection (LFC). No parcel entrainment is considered. The CAPE and CIN calculations use the virtual temperature correction.) values reached into the 1,000–2,000 Joules per kilogram range in the Ohio Valley, and upwards in excess of 3,000–4,000 J/kg ahead of the cold front in southern Missouri, western Arkansas, and eastern Oklahoma. Lift fostered the development of storms near the surface low, while a backed wind field ahead of the low resulted in a corridor of potent wind shear in east-central Missouri to central Indiana, making the environment more favorable for discrete supercells. Tornadoes, some strong, were expected during the late afternoon and night hours, with a mesoscale convective system (MCS) later taking place over the central U.S. by early April 20.

=== April 20 ===
The SPC issued before 12:30 AM (05:30 UTC) on Wednesday, April 20, two large slight risks for severe weather across the southern United States and the East Coast/Mid-Atlantic regions. A massive 2% tornado risk was situated from the Mexico–U.S border in Texas to the western tip of North Carolina, while a 15% damaging winds risk spanned from eastern Virginia to the tri-border region of New York, New Jersey, and Pennsylvania. Later during the day, at 2:42 PM CDT (19:42 UTC), updates were made in regard to the upcoming severe weather threat. The primary hazards were damaging winds and hail across portions of western Texas, to areas in south-central Arkansas, northern Louisiana, and north-central Mississippi. The main tornado threat remained at a 2% risk, but was now only positioned over an area from the Mexican–American border to south-central Alabama. Simultaneously, a secondary 2% tornado risk was positioned over eastern Pennsylvania but also northwestern New Jersey.

During the outlook update at 11:23 AM CDT (16:23 UTC), forecasters acknowledged the presence of an unstable air mass with MLCAPE values soaring into the 2,000–4,000 J/kg range across the moist, warm sector over the southern U.S. Boundary layer dew points also reached into the upper 60 °F (16 °C) to lower 70 °F (21 °C) range over this area. Later, convective trends resulted in further adjustments to the risk in the lower Mississippi Valley. It was apparent that low-level advection would start up an upward evolving MCS north of the warm front. Several thunderstorms, mainly hail producers, had evolved over Arkansas. This activity continued eastward and was expected to develop during the afternoon. In the Edwards Plateau region of Texas, unusually steep lapse rates contributed to thunderstorm development, where high temperatures had risen into the 90 °F (32 °C) range. In New York, the damaging wind risk was decreased as weak instability persisted, especially for the Hudson Valley as temperatures remained at a range between 40–50 °F (4–10 °C). The presence of showers was increasing as a cold front moved across central Pennsylvania, with activity amplified during the noon over eastern Pennsylvania and western New Jersey.

=== April 21 ===
The SPC issued later in the evening of April 20, at 8:00 PM CDT (01:00 UTC), two regions under a slight risk of potent thunderstorms: one in central Texas and the other in a region between south-central Arkansas and northwestern Georgia. For the upcoming Thursday, two small 2–5% tornado risk contours existed in south-central Texas and primarily north-central Mississippi. In Mississippi and the bordering states of Alabama and Arkansas, a large, moderate 30% hail risk spanned the region. By the latest outlook update, at 2:42 PM CDT (19:42 UTC), the contours were drastically changed. A singular, large slight risk extended north from Kansas and Missouri, southwest to the Mexican–American border in Texas, and southeast in south-central Alabama and extreme northwestern Florida. The primary hail hazard diminished over the Midsouth, in place for a large 15% hatched (Note: Hatched risks refer to a 10% or greater chance of significant severe weather events taking place within 25 miles (40 km) of any set point in the forecasted area of risk.: For tornadoes, it could mean for those of EF2 strength or stronger.; For thunderstorms wind gusts, it could be interpreted for hurricane-force winds of 74 miles per hour (119 km/h) or higher.; For hail, a diameter of 2 inches (5.1 cm) or greater is guaranteed to likely occur.) hail risk mainly across southwestern to northern Texas for the newest high-level threat. A 15% damaging wind contour sat over the same southern region of the primary categorical slight risk. The tornado risk too was updated to include a relatively large 5% tornado risk in northern Texas, on the southern flank of the Red River.

Steep lapse rates along the dry line amplified convective conditions over the eastern Davis Mountains, in western Texas. Isolated thunderstorms were to evolve along the western fringes of a moist boundary later, where MLCAPE values exceeded 3,000 J/kg. The environment was conducive for supercells that produced large, damaging hail. Over in the Deep South, an MCS was set to track southeastward from Mississippi into Alabama. Instability levels downstream for this region waned slightly but were still potent enough for the enhancement of downbursts and damaging winds along the leading edge. From southeastern Kansas to parts of Arkansas, elevated convection was driven up by warm advection, leading to a multi-cluster zone in the form of hailstorms. Activity for this area gradually expanded eastward.

=== April 22 ===
Mesoscale discussion map showing potent wind shear levels in Missouri

On Friday, April 22, at 1:00 AM CDT (06:00 UTC), the SPC issued a widespread slight risk area for severe storms spanning from central Texas to western Ohio, alongside a large 2% tornado risk for most of Missouri, Illinois, Indiana and northwestern Kentucky, as one of the two short-wave troughs was forecasted to weaken as it entered Wyoming from the northeast. Meanwhile the leading trough was expected to become even further perturbated, (Note: See definitions of 'perturbation' at The American Meteorological Society.) evolving into a 500-millibar low area over northwestern South Dakota by 1:00 PM CDT (18:00 UTC) and accelerate to the east-northeast. Lee cyclogenesis over southeastern Colorado was forecasted to lift northeastwards along a strengthening front extending from southern Kansas to western Illinois, evolving into a triple point cyclone for the occluded surface low associated with the upper trough over South Dakota.

At the same time, a cold front was forecasted to sweep eastwards across the Missouri/Illinois area, and as far east as Ohio, later stalling over northwest Texas to southeast Oklahoma as a secondary, weaker low developed. Advection and mixing was expected to force the dry line move to the east across west-central Texas and southern Oklahoma by day. The cold front was forecasted to overtake the dry line in south-central Oklahoma towards the surface low, where the triple point was expected to develop. As a result, multiple rounds of thunderstorms were expected to affect portions of this area to the Ohio Valley, with 1,000–3,000 J/kg from southern Missouri to the Indiana/Ohio border area.

At 3:00 PM CDT (20:00 UTC) on April 22, the SPC reported a cluster of storms which fired up earlier in the morning near St. Louis, around the level 4/5 moderate risk contour. This cluster in the area of moderately strong, elevated instability was associated with the warm advection near the nose of the low-level jet. Activity caused by the cluster maintained organization, as the storm cells moved eastward towards the Ohio Valley during the afternoon and evening. A retreating surface warm front over the region was expected to aid and focus the convection production. Damaging winds and hail were the main hazards, however, a tornado watch was issued for most of central Missouri and western Illinois due to expectations that the low-level winds would help intensify the storms in the afternoon and evening.

Over two hours later at 5:21 PM CDT (22:21 UTC), the SPC issued a mesoscale discussion pertaining information about the atmospheric conditions across the tornado watch area. The environment remained favorable for the development of tornadic supercells, particularly in a region spanning from Jefferson City, Missouri towards St. Louis. Surface winds rotated to the east ahead of the low area and in the wake of earlier convection, where wind shear was more potent and 0–1 kilometre (0.00–0.62 mi) storm relative helicity values that were in excess of 300 m²/s². Ongoing cells south of Columbia, Missouri at this time showed signs of strong rotation, with the trend increasing as the storms approached the region of greater low-level wind shear to their east. This heightened the threat for isolated strong tornadoes.

== Confirmed tornadoes ==
Confirmed tornadoes by Enhanced Fujita rating
EFU	EF0	EF1	EF2	EF3	EF4	EF5	Total
0	46	49	13	1	1	0	110

=== Girard, Illinois ===
Girard, Illinois
- The tornado near Girard

Meteorological history
- Formed: April 19, 2011, 5:58 PM CDT (UTC−05:00)
- Dissipated: April 19, 2011, 6:05 PM CDT (UTC−05:00)
- Duration: 7 minutes

EF3 tornado
- on the Enhanced Fujita scale
- Highest winds: 150 mph (240 km/h)

Overall effects
- Fatalities: 0
- Injuries: 2

An intense and damaging tornado first touched down in the northeastern portions of Macoupin County at 5:58 PM CDT (22:58 UTC) on April 19, on Emerson Airline Road around 2.5 miles (4.0 km) to the west of Girard. Several homes along the road suffered extensive damage as the tornado began to track northeastward. As it crossed Henry Road just to the north of the Henry Road–Emerson Airline Road intersection, it demolished several barns and struck three homes. One was destroyed while another suffered significant damage, and debris trapped homeowners in their basement until first responders arrived. Around this time, the tornado inflicted minor injuries to two individuals who were heading to the basement. The tornado then began to turn eastward, destroying more outbuildings and striking several homesteads along Neff Road, destroying one.

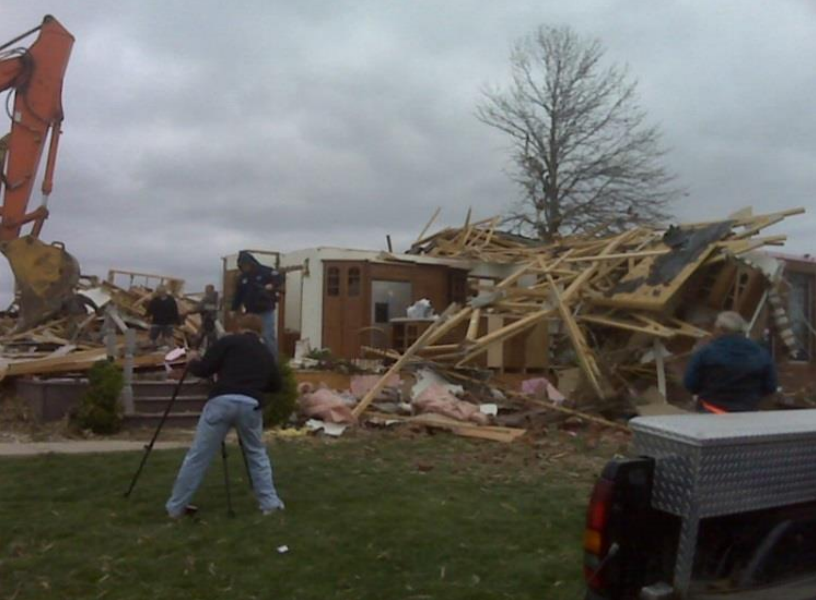
EF3 damage to a brick farmhouse along Prose Road

Audio recorded of the tornado

The tornado then approached Please Hill Road about 1.2 miles (1.9 km) north of Girard, where a brick home suffered extensive damage and all nearby outbuildings were destroyed. The tornado continued to the east, destroying a farmstead and killing several cows before turning to the southeast. The tornado then crossed Prose Road around half a mile south of the intersection connecting Prose and Substation Roads, where a brick farmhouse had most exterior walls collapsed while interior walls remained standing. This residence was given an EF3 rating, as estimated wind speeds of 150 mph (240 km/h) impacted this farm home. The tornado turned and began to track southeast, inflicting moderate roof damage to a home along the Kimes Road/Adams Road intersection. The tornado then struck one final farmstead along Adams Road, inflicting minor damage before lifting at 6:05 PM CDT (23:05 UTC).

The tornado had a very curved path as it went north around Girard, with a total length of 5.1 miles (8.2 km) and reached a maximum width of 200 yards (180 m). The tornado injured two people and killed numerous cattle.

=== Northern St. Louis metropolitan area, Missouri/Granite City, Illinois ===
Northern St. Louis metropolitan area, Missouri/Granite City, Illinois
- The tornado illuminated by a power flash near Bridgeton

Meteorological history
- Formed: April 22, 2011, 7:59 PM CDT (UTC–05:00)
- Dissipated: April 22, 2011, 8:31 PM CDT (UTC–05:00)
- Duration: 32 minutes

EF4 tornado
- on the Enhanced Fujita scale
- Highest winds: 170 mph (270 km/h)

Overall effects
- Fatalities: 0
- Injuries: 5
- Damage: >$250 million (≥$590,950,000 in 2025 USD)

During the evening hours of Good Friday, April 22, a supercell dropped a powerful tornado in the northwestern suburbs of the St. Louis, Missouri metropolitan area, at 7:59 PM CDT (00:59 UTC). The tornado touched down north of Creve Coeur Lake, in the northern parts of Maryland Heights at around EF1 intensity. After moving east and crossing the Missouri Eastern Railroad tracks, the storm intensified to EF2 strength, damaging poles along a 0.25-mile (440 yd; 400 m) wide swath before it impacted into its first neighborhood.

The tornado became intense as it persisted eastwards, now at EF3 intensity; along Jeannette Mary Drive, one house suffered the collapse of most of its exterior and interior walls. EF2 damage occurred throughout suburban areas within Maryland Heights, located west of Interstate 270. Crossing over the freeway, the tornado maintained significant status, as it immediately tore the roof off one home along Charleston Drive before weakening down to EF1 strength. At the same time, the path moved a little northeastward, before the tornado returned on its easterly course. The storm re-strengthened back to EF2 status along Parkwood Lane, as a residential structure's garage collapsed and its roof was ripped off.

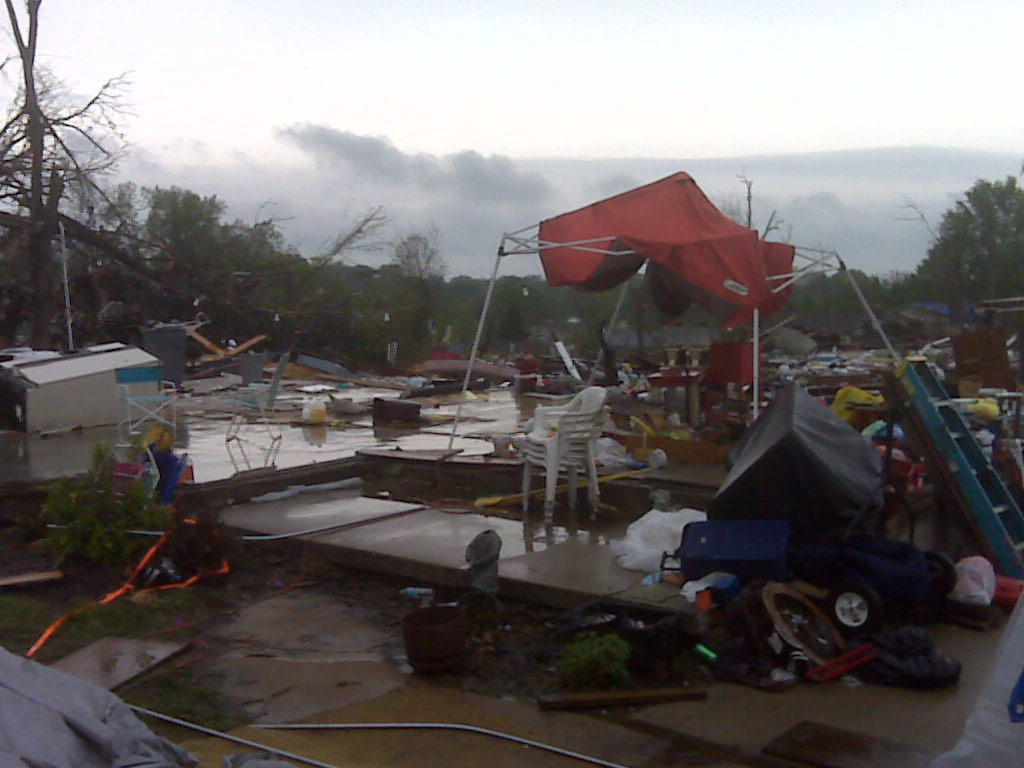
A house that was completely destroyed at EF4 intensity in Bridgeton, Missouri

Now crossing over into Bridgeton and paralleling Old St. Charles Road, the tornado weakened slightly again and causing EF1 damage, before abruptly intensifying as it approached the three-way intersection connecting Old St. Charles Road with Harmann Estates Drive. Encroaching on the junction, the tornado gained intensity with winds at 130 mph (210 km/h) after causing high-end EF2 damage to a house. Abruptly, the tornado strengthened to EF3 status with winds of 150 mph (240 km/h), causing mid-range EF3 damage to a residence to the east. Only a few walls remained standing. Thereafter, the tornado became violent as it inflicted EF4 damage to a neighboring house. Winds of 170 mph (270 km/h) winds collapsed all walls on this particular home, and EF3 tree debarking occurred north of the property. The tornado then weakened down to EF3 strength after crossing Harmann Estates Drive.

Along Beaverton Drive, a neighborhood was impacted at high-end EF3 status. The tornado afterwards paralleled Interstate 70 whilst remaining intense. Some buildings in a business district along the freeway were heavily damaged or destroyed by the tornado before it weakened to EF2 strength. Remaining strong, the tornado then skirted northern St. Ann before it struck St. Louis Lambert International Airport with surprise, despite earlier warnings. Parts of Terminal 1 were heavily impacted at EF2 intensity. East of the airport, the tornado impacted neighborhoods within Berkeley, Ferguson and Bellefontaine Neighbors, leaving localized spots of EF2 damage behind. Crossing the Mississippi River into Illinois, the tornado weakened before entering northern portions of Granite City. For the last time, it caused EF2 damage to homes along Dawn Place before dissipating at 8:31 PM CDT (01:31 UTC).

This violent tornado was the strongest to affect St. Louis since the F4 tornado over 44 years ago on January 24, 1967. The tornado tracked for 21.3 miles (34.3 km) and was 880 yards (0.50 mi; 800 m) wide. Five people were injured at St. Louis Lambert International Airport after being struck by debris. No fatalities were reported during the event.

== April 19–20 Ozarks–Ohio Valley derecho ==
The four bow echo paths, along with diverse storm reports, across the east-central United States on April 19–20

After dusk on April 19, a long-lived squall line, with four large-scale bow echoes, traveled from the Ozarks to the Ohio Valley, subsequently transitioning into a serial derecho. (Note: A serial derecho is a type of derecho characterized by the presence of multiple bow echoes embedded in an extensive squall line. This type of storm is the most prevalent during the spring and autumn months in the United States.) The derecho was formed by bands of supercell thunderstorms that were trailing along and ahead of a cold front, which was associated with a developing surface low-pressure area in eastern Kansas during the dawn hours on April 19. The low area ended its track towards Lake Erie on the morning of April 20. During the event, the first three bowing segments eventually conjoined, spanning a massive region across the central United States between northeastern Texas and western Ohio. Two people were injured in Alabama, while over 900 severe weather reports were submitted to the Storm Prediction Center across a widespread region, including several embedded tornadoes.

The highest estimated wind gusts during the event occurred in Hamilton and White Counties, Illinois. In Hamilton County, an intense macroburst produced a 104-knot (120 mph; 193 km/h) gust along a path 4 miles (6.4 km) long, downing numerous powerlines and trees, and damaging or destroying several homes, barns, sheds, and other structures. In White County, similar strong gusts were seen near Emma and Sacramento. The one near Emma was a downburst associated with the dissipation of a nearby EF2 tornado. Two flatbed trailers were flipped and a nearby large equipment shed was unroofed, with dozens of trees snapped or uprooted north-northeast of Emma. Between Norris City and Enfield, near the Sacramento area, numerous farm structures were damaged or destroyed, and hundreds of trees were uprooted. Powerlines were also downed, and a mobile home was overturned.

=== Bow echoes ===
NEXRAD radar scan of the northernmost bow echo seen over eastern Illinois

The first bow echo of the system was the northernmost one of the event. This bowing segment formed around 7:00 PM CDT (00:00 UTC), along an arc that stretched from the St. Louis metropolitan area to east-central Illinois. The bow was largely developed as a result of merging thunderstorms ahead of the cold front earlier, near the St. Louis metro region. The faster-moving storms that trailed along the front eventually overtook the ones further to the east, concluding with additional and strengthening convection. During the mid-evening of April 19, the large cold pool had surged into central Indiana, leading to 75–80 mph (121–129 km/h) ground winds in central Illinois. Widespread tree and powerline damage was attributed to the storm system, with the roofs removed from one school in St. Louis and an industrial building and shopping center near Fort Wayne, Indiana. Semi-trucks near Centralia, Illinois were flipped over, and one trailer in eastern Indiana was rolled twice. Numerous vehicles northwest of the Indianapolis area were blown off Interstate 65. Scattered reports of structural damage came in an extensive area west of the Ohio border. National Weather Service surveys considered that small tornadoes, embedded into embedded circulations, caused some of the damage. One tornado in Licking County, Ohio, produced a gust of 102 mph (164 km/h) in the region. Another strong tornado destroyed farmhouses in Macoupin County, Illinois, leaving people trapped in debris.

The second bow echo of the serial derecho formed soon after the first, causing widespread wind damage in southeastern Missouri. Many forests were damaged, and an HVAC unit was blown off one high school roof in Cape Girardeau. To the west near Marble Hill, the storm produced an estimated 70–75 mph (113–121 km/h) wind gust. In southern Illinois, a section of the Carbondale police station's roof was torn away. Additional damage ensued as debris from the police station landed on three nearby residences. Gusts of 95 mph (153 km/h) occurred in Alexander and Johnson Counties. To the east, widespread tree damage occurred in an area that extended all the way to the Indiana border. Across the state border, gusts of 75 mph (121 km/h) affected the Evansville area, while mobile homes near Jasper were overturned. In northwestern Kentucky, the city of Owensboro was "blasted" by 75 mph (121 km/h) winds, with trees and power lines downed between Owensboro and the Louisville metropolitan area and elsewhere in eastern Kentucky. The highest estimated winds gusts ranged from 80–120 mph (130–190 km/h) near Covington, where a rest stop was damaged and semi-trucks were blown off Interstate 75. The National Weather Service in Wilmington, Ohio, reported that a gust of 79 mph (127 km/h) was recorded at their office, where the roof of one aircraft hangar was partially removed.

A visual satellite timelapse of the derecho

The third bow echo formed from merging supercell thunderstorms near Little Rock, Arkansas, at around 9:00 PM CDT (02:00 UTC). This particular storm system accelerated rapidly to the east-northeast, reaching Memphis, Tennessee prior to 11:00 PM CDT (04:00 UTC). It lay across western and central Tennessee and southern Kentucky for most of its life before dissipating over the western Appalachian Mountains around 5:00 AM EDT (09:00 UTC). Earlier in its track in Jefferson County, Arkansas, the storm's outflow winds uprooted trees, resulting in a pipeline rupture and gas leak. In northeastern Arkansas, measured winds of 95 mph (153 km/h) swept a large outbuilding off its foundation, and onto a nearby road. Tractor-trailers in Crittenden County were tipped over, and a roof from a nearby business was torn away. Over in Memphis, winds measured at 70 mph (110 km/h) snapped trees and power poles. The tree damage was especially notable over parts of northwestern Tennessee, with some downed on homes and vehicles. Widespread power outages also occurred in the region. In downtown Nashville, a building had its bricks and portions of its roof removed.

The fourth and final bow echo segment occurred at 4:00 AM CDT (09:00 UTC) the following day, over northeastern Mississippi. This bowing segment formed after the three northern systems weakened. This specific system also formed from a broken line of storms that developed earlier during the night near the cold front as the boundary moved into the Ark-La-Tex region. As this system moved across the Mississippi Delta, only intermittent instances of severe weather was produced, as it entered a region that was overturned by earlier convection. When the line approached the Tupelo region, the system encountered an unstable air mass, which caused the storm to rapidly intensify in both strength and organization. The line quickly took a large bow-echo appearance and persisted eastward into northern Alabama during the pre-dawn hours and northern Georgia after sunrise. In Tupelo, Mississippi, wind gusts exceeding 65 mph (105 km/h) downed trees and electrical lines. The derecho strengthened in Madison County, Alabama, where fallen trees damaged homes. Strong winds caused the roofs to be blown off of residential structures. Near Florette, one person was injured when a tree fell onto their house. A similar injury happened to another person near Holly Pond. In Jackson County, a building lost its metal roof during the storm. A nearby secured trailer was flipped over. Isolated damage occurred south in central parts of Alabama and extreme northwestern Georgia during the morning hours.

== Impact ==
Tornadoes during this multi-day outbreak caused over $250 million in damages, with the bulk being attributed to the EF4 tornado that struck metropolitan St. Louis, Missouri on April 22. Despite the high amount of confirmed tornadoes during the event, no fatalities were reported, though 12 people sustained injuries.

=== Aftermath ===
On April 19, tornadoes affected a region between southeastern Oklahoma and the Ohio River and Western Appalachian Mountains. Several significant tornadoes occurred in Illinois, Indiana, and Ohio. In Illinois, the strongest tornado that day was an EF3 tornado that impacted farmsteads north of Girard. At one farmstead, a couple was injured by this intense tornado as they were subjected to blunt trauma and lacerations from flying debris. Another farmer lost his 100-year old barn during the storms while herding his cows, some of them got trapped by debris. American Red Cross (ARC) personnel were deployed to the area north of the city. Power outages, damaging winds, and large hail were reported in Girard, Auburn, Farmersville, Kincaid, Litchfield, Nokomis, Raymond, and Waverly. Ameren reported that 2,600 of its Illinois customers across Christian, Macoupin, Montgomery, Morgan, and Sangamon Counties had no electricity the following day.

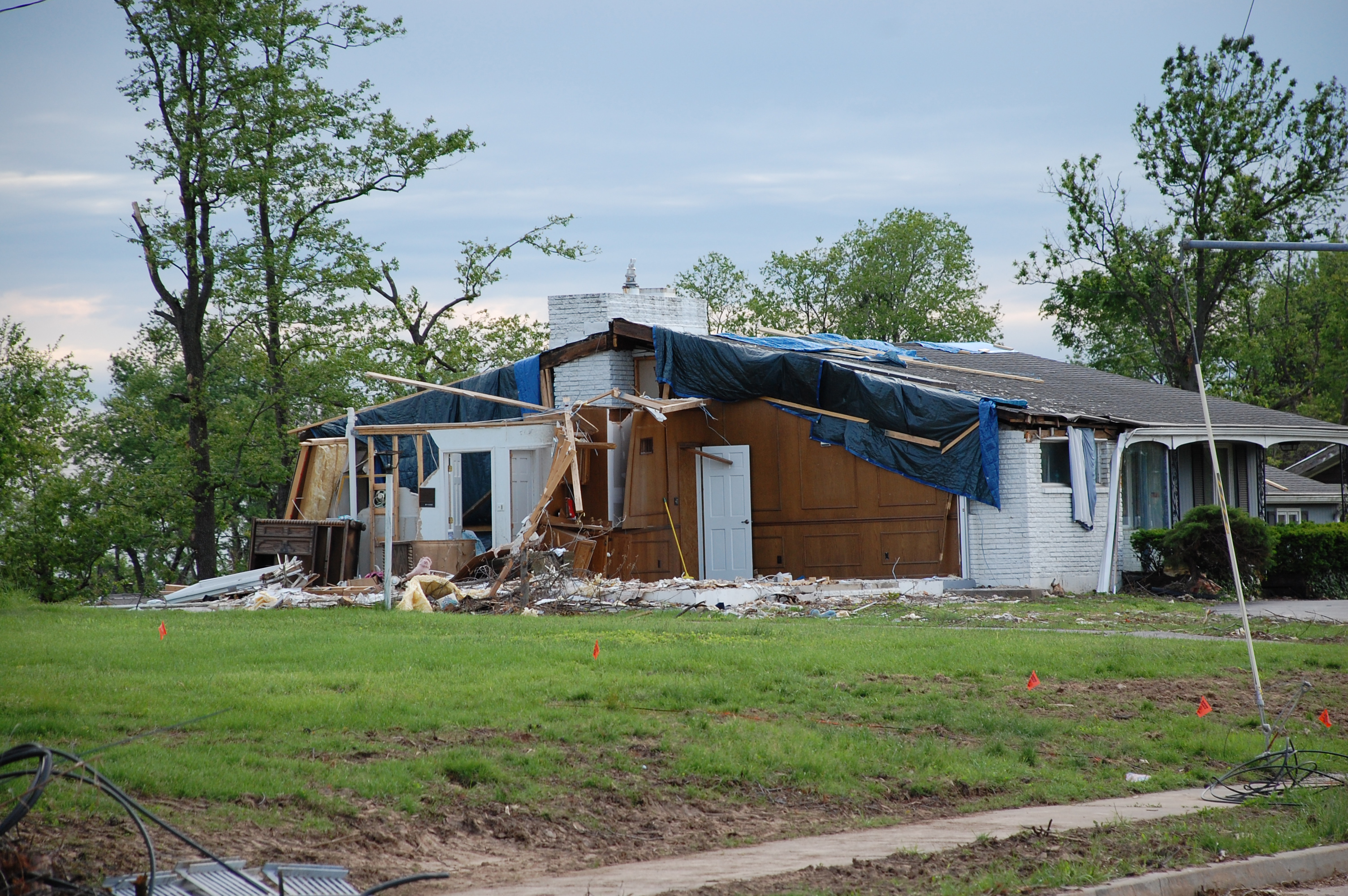
One of several damaged homes seen in Bridgeton

Severe weather returned to the region on April 22. Tornadoes impacted from central Oklahoma to northern Kentucky on Good Friday, with a few of them being significant (EF2+) tornadoes across eastern Missouri, southwestern Illinois, and northwestern Kentucky. In Missouri, the highest-rated tornado was a violent, rainwrapped, and costly EF4 tornado that tore through the northern St. Louis metro region. It was the strongest tornado of the outbreak, with estimated winds of 170 mph (270 km/h) assessed by the city's National Weather Service. Several suburbs were affected by this damaging tornado, especially the city of Bridgeton, Missouri. The most significant impact the tornado inflicted, however, was at St. Louis Lambert International Airport. There, windows in the terminals were shattered and airplanes were blown by the wind. Flights from Southwest Airlines were canceled as a result, and the Federal Aviation Administration shut the airport down for 24 hours. Five people were injured during the Good Friday tornado, and the ARC was dispatched to the region. The tornado damaged or destroyed around 2,700 structures.

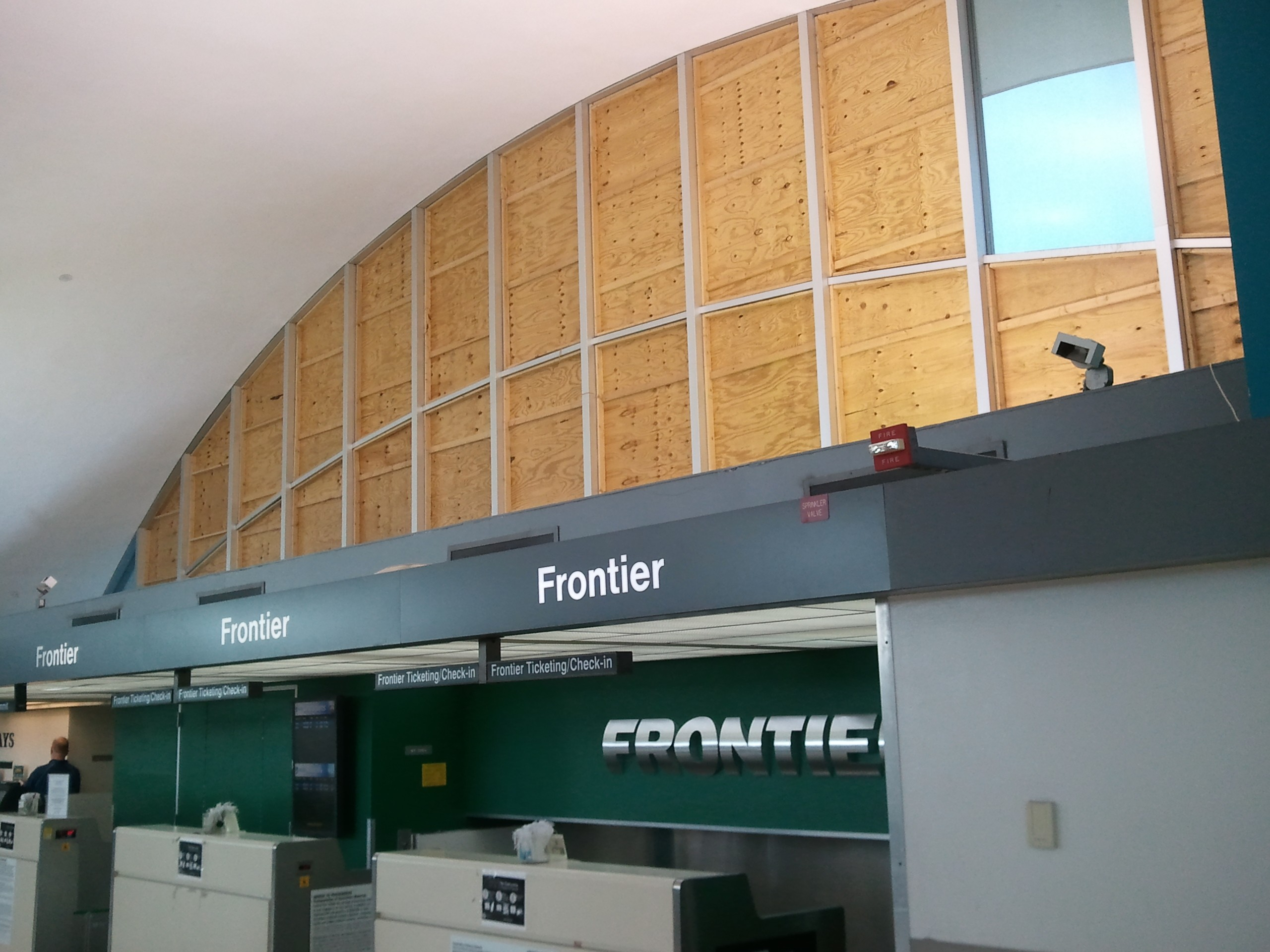
Windows boarded up at St. Louis's airport after the tornado

=== Recovery efforts ===
A few days after the April 19 tornadoes in Illinois, a donation site was set up at the First National Bank in Girard to aid tornado victims. The churches in Girard and Virden worked together to hand out free meals, and volunteers helped out clean up the debris north of town. In the wake of the April 22 St. Louis tornado, the Federal Emergency Management Agency was deployed to the area to conduct monetary damage assessments on April 27, with U.S. Secretary of Homeland Security Janet Napolitano visiting two days later on April 29. In early May 2011, U.S. President Barack Obama declared parts of Missouri a disaster area, following the severe weather events from Good Friday. Recovery in St. Louis was rapid as survivors began rebuilding, with Missouri state governor Jay Nixon touring the damage and calling it a "little bit of divine intervention". Ameren reported that the company restored power to its customers in the days following the St. Louis tornado. At Lambert International Airport, the hub was expected resume operation at a lesser capacity by April 24. A year later in 2012, the international airport was fully rebuilt and operational again. The efforts were commended by U.S. congressman Lacy Clay, who returned to the hub since his initial visit in the immediate aftermath.

== See also ==
- Weather of 2011
- List of United States tornadoes in April 2011
- List of North American tornadoes and tornado outbreaks
- List of F4, EF4, and IF4 tornadoes
  - List of F4 and EF4 tornadoes (2010–2019)
- Tornado outbreak of May 15–16, 2025 – Another tornado outbreak that occurred over some of the same areas
  - 2025 St. Louis tornado – A massive and deadly EF3 tornado that also struck parts of St. Louis, Missouri during the 2025 outbreak
