= Nameoki Township, Madison County, Illinois =

Nameoki Township
- Township
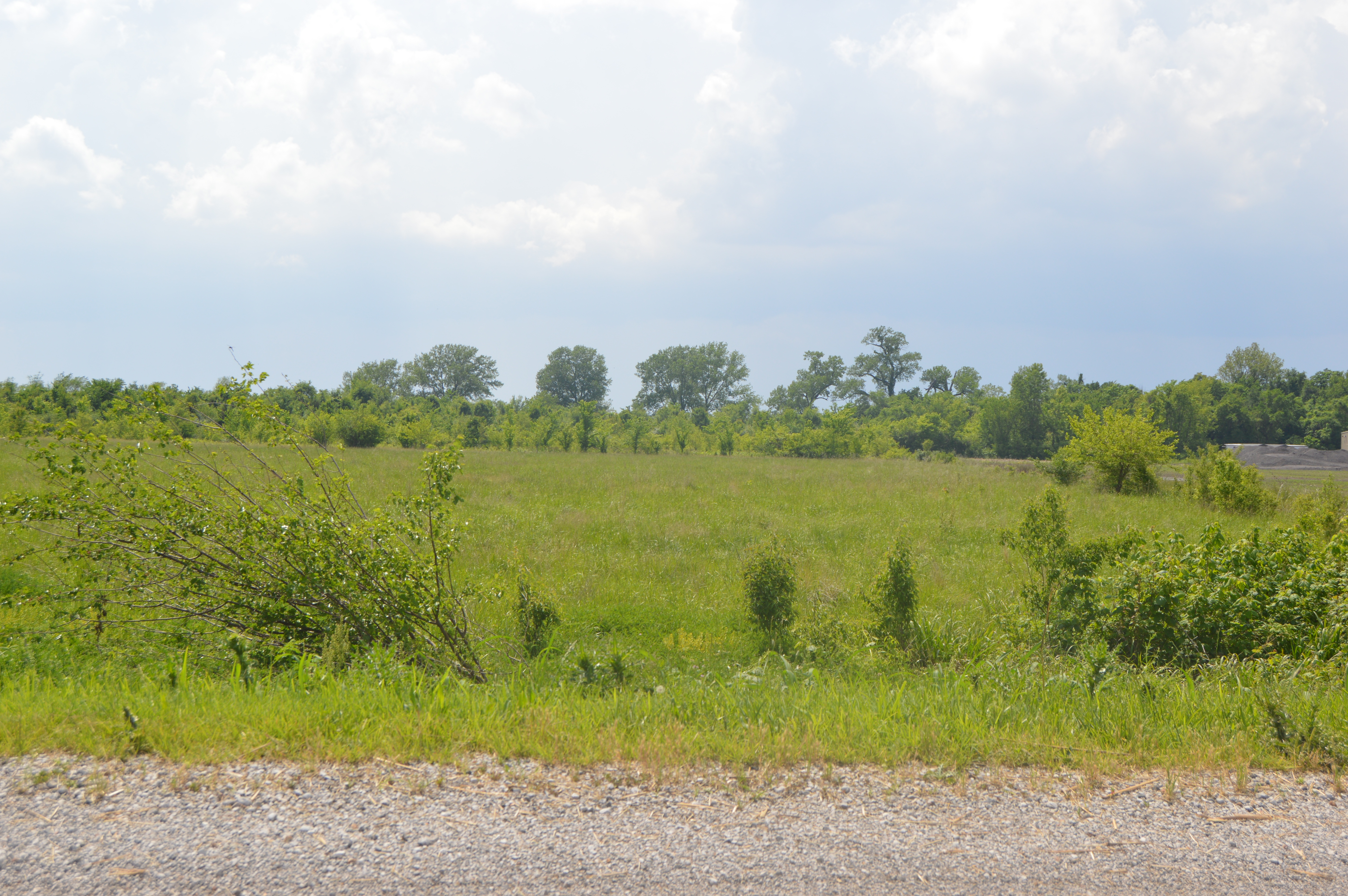
- Park along Horseshoe Lake

- Location of Illinois in the United States
- Coordinates: 38°42′09″N 90°05′05″W
- Country: United States
- State: Illinois
- County: Madison
- Settled: November 2, 1875

Area
  - Total: 26.76 sq mi (69.3 km^{2})
  - Land: 21.95 sq mi (56.9 km^{2})
  - Water: 4.81 sq mi (12.5 km^{2})
- Elevation: 400 ft (120 m)

Population (2010)
  - Estimate (2016): 12,347
  - Density: 577.8/sq mi (223.1/km^{2})
- Time zone: UTC-6 (CST)
  - Summer (DST): UTC-5 (CDT)
- FIPS code: 17-119-51583
- Website: www.nameokitownship.net

Nameoki Township is located in Madison County, Illinois, in the United States. As of the 2010 census, its population was 12,685 and it contained 5,352 housing units.

== History ==
Nameoki is derived from a Native American name meaning "smoky".

== Geography ==
According to the 2010 census, the township has a total area of 26.76 square miles (69.3 km^{2}), of which 21.95 square miles (56.9 km^{2}) (or 82.03%) is land and 4.81 square miles (12.5 km^{2}) (or 17.97%) is water.

== Demographics ==
Historical population
Census	Pop.	Note	%±
2016 (est.)	12,347
U.S. Decennial Census
