= Magruder =

Magruder is a surname. Notable people with the surname include:

- Allan B. Magruder, American politician
- Benjamin D. Magruder (1838–1910), Illinois Supreme Court Justice
- Caleb Clarke Magruder Jr. (1839–1923), American politician and lawyer
- Carter B. Magruder, US Army general
- Chris Magruder, American baseball player
- Charles Magruder, progenitor of thousands of African-Americans with the surname Magruder or McGruder
- Daniel Randall Magruder (1835–1915), judge of the Maryland Court of Appeals
- Dick Magruder (1946–1978), American businessman and politician
- J. Maynard Magruder (1900–1969), American businessman and politician
- James Magruder, American playwright, author, and translator
- Jeb Stuart Magruder, figure in the Watergate scandal
- John Magruder (1887–1958), brigadier general in the United States Army
- John B. Magruder, American Confederate Army general
- Patrick Magruder, Librarian of Congress
- Philip W. Magruder (1838–1907), member of Virginia House of Delegates
- Richard H. Magruder (died 1884), American politician
- Scooter Magruder, online personality
- Sydney Magruder Washington, American ballet dancer
- Thomas Magruder, the main villain in the video game Gun
- Zadok Magruder (1729–1811), Maryland politician

== See also ==
- Magruder, Virginia
- Col. Zadok Magruder High School, in Derwood, Maryland
- Magruder's, an American grocery chain
- Justice Magruder (disambiguation)
