= Meteorological history of the 2011 Super Outbreak =

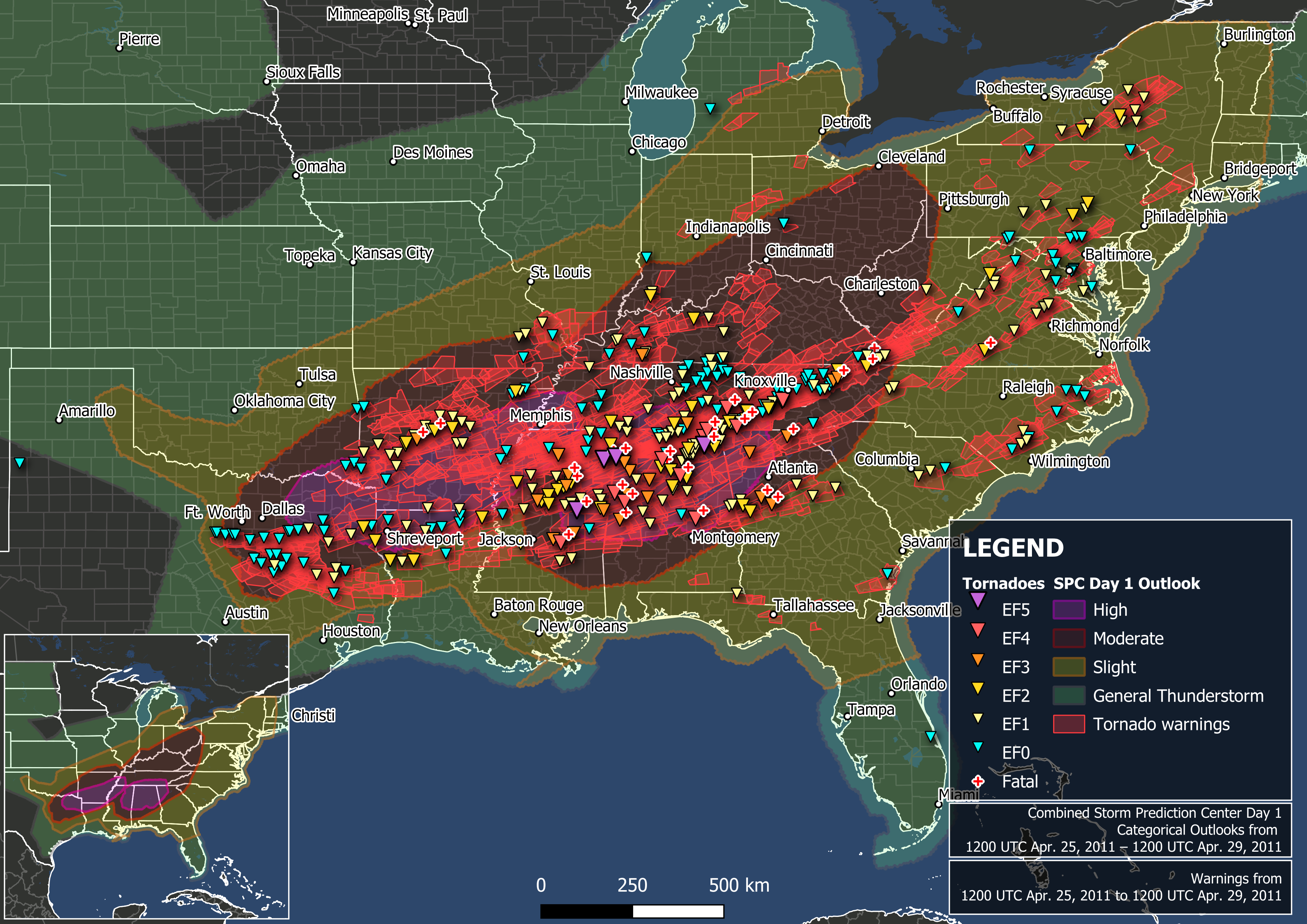
Full map of the 2011 Super Outbreak documenting the amount of tornadoes and tornado warnings issued, along with tornado deaths

The 2011 Super Outbreak, the largest tornado outbreak in recorded history, was caused by a volatile set of meteorological conditions that led to the outbreak.

== Overview ==
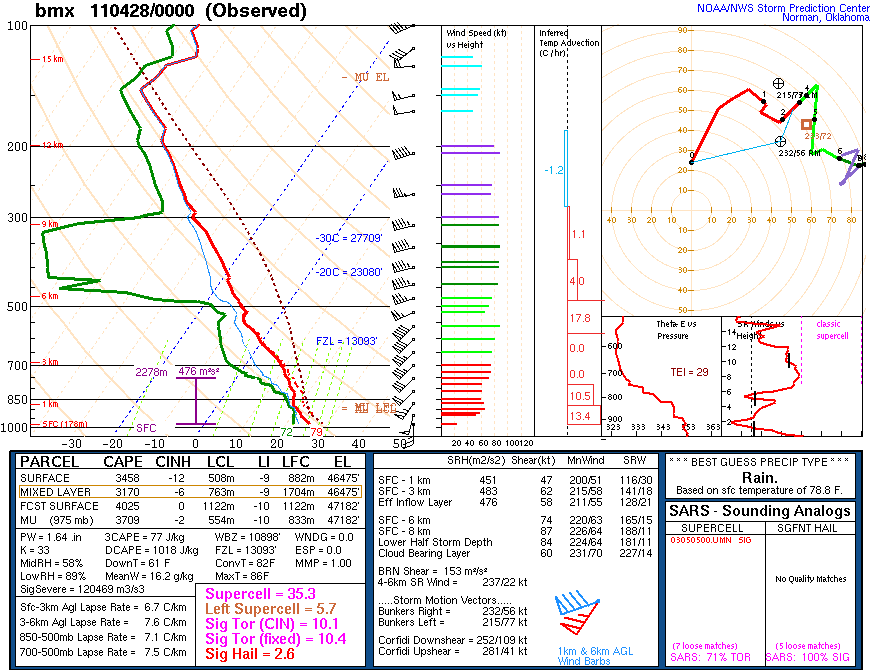
The 0000z atmospheric sounding, taken from Birmingham, Alabama on April 27.

On April 25, NOAA's Storm Prediction Center (SPC) noted the potential for a multi-day severe weather outbreak across most of the central and eastern United States. A vigorous negative-tilt upper-level trough had moved into the Southern Plains states early in the day, with an northeastward-moving extratropical cyclone forming between northeastern Oklahoma and western Missouri. Similar conditions were noted on April 26, with a high likelihood of a severe thunderstorm outbreak. This included the potential for all hazards - damaging winds of up to 80-90 mph, large hail of roughly 2-3" in diameter, and especially the potential for strong to violent, long-tracked tornadoes. As the afternoon and evening of April 26 progressed, mixed-layer CAPE values across the ArkLaTex region ranged from around 3000-4000 J/kg, and combined with moderate wind shear and steep lapse rates, created an extremely volatile and unstable environment, producing initially discrete supercells capable of strong to violent, long-track tornadoes during the afternoon and early evening, shifting over to a wind and hail-driven mesoscale convective complex in the nighttime.

This vigorous storm system moved into the Ohio, Mississippi and Tennessee Valleys on April 27. During this time, a vigorous 80-100 kt jet stream overspread the Ohio and Tennessee Valleys behind the trough, creating very strong wind shear, along with a strong low pressure center moving quickly northeastward that same day. That afternoon, temperatures ranged from the 70s °F (mid-20s °C) to the lower 90s °F (near 35 °C); this helped contribute to CAPE values of between 2000 and 3000 J/kg, with the moderate instability moving northeastward across the southern Tennessee Valley. Combined with 0–1 km storm-relative helicity values in the 450–600 m^{2}/s² range, this created an atmosphere extremely conducive to significant tornadic activity and strong to violent, long-track tornadoes.

In total, the SPC issued 56 severe weather watches during the entire four-day outbreak - 41 tornado watches, 10 of which were deemed particularly dangerous situation (PDS) watches, and 15 severe thunderstorm watches. The SPC assigns numbers to each severe weather watch issued starting at the beginning of each year; the organization accidentally skipped over two of their allocated watch numbers during this outbreak (numbers 208 and 209).

== April 25 ==
A large area of possible severe storms for April 25–27 was forecast as the Storm Prediction Center (SPC) issued a moderate risk of severe weather for three consecutive days, centered over Arkansas through Tennessee. At 3:25 p.m. CDT (20:25 UTC), the SPC issued a particularly dangerous situation (PDS) tornado watch for much of Arkansas and parts of Missouri, Oklahoma, Texas, and Louisiana. By the evening of April 25, tornadoes had been reported across a few states, some of which caused significant damage in Arkansas. An intense supercell thunderstorm tracked near the Little Rock area and a tornado emergency was declared for the city of Vilonia. A large EF2 wedge tornado struck the town, subsequently causing severe damage and killing four people. A strong EF3 tornado also struck the Hot Springs Village area earlier that evening; the tornado caused severe damage and resulted in one death. Later that evening, another EF2 tornado caused extensive damage to both a school building and Little Rock Air Force Base as well. Severe flooding continued across a large area from the Red River valley to the Great Lakes. A total of 42 tornadoes and five tornado-related deaths were confirmed on the 25th.

== April 26 ==
This animation of satellite images from April 26 through the morning of April 28 shows the development of the storm system which spawned the tornadoes.

A high risk of severe weather was issued for April 26 for portions of Louisiana, Arkansas, Oklahoma, and Texas along and near the I-30 corridor as conditions became even more favorable for extreme weather. A large PDS tornado watch with very high possibilities for tornadoes was issued for that same area that afternoon. Widespread tornado warnings were then issued in that area later that evening.

An upper-level negatively tilted trough with two embedded shortwaves generated two surface lows that propagated generally east. One of the surface lows tracked northeast along the Mississippi River into Wisconsin as it occluded. Tornado watches were issued for the Lower Great Lakes during the afternoon as supercell thunderstorms developed along the warm front lifting north across central Michigan. Two tornadoes touched down in Michigan and caused damage to farm structures. Further east, severe thunderstorms caused scattered wind damage and large hail across Pennsylvania and New York. Two-inch-diameter hail was reported in Lock Haven, Pennsylvania. An isolated supercell moved across Central New York throughout much of the afternoon, producing golf ball-sized hail in Syracuse and spawning a very brief EF1 tornado in Verona Mills, which primarily caused damage to trees. Another tornado – this one being in Gilbertsville – caused significant damage to a school's athletic field.

The second surface low corresponded to an area of strong upper level divergence ahead of the downstream shortwave. As the low formed across Texas and deepened while moving east, a tightening pressure gradient force further strengthened the low-level jet, therefore creating a broad warm sector across the southeastern states. This also generated stronger wind shear, providing better organization for the supercell storms as a result. Numerous tornadoes touched down across several states, including Texas, Louisiana, and Arkansas. Most of those tornadoes were weak, but a few of them caused considerable damage. A long-tracked wedge tornado caused EF2 damage in rural portions of Texas and Louisiana. An EF3 tornado destroyed structures and caused severe damage at Fort Campbell, Kentucky, as well. A total of 55 tornadoes were confirmed on the 26th, although no fatalities occurred.

== April 27 ==
Storm Prediction Center outlooks on April 27, 2011

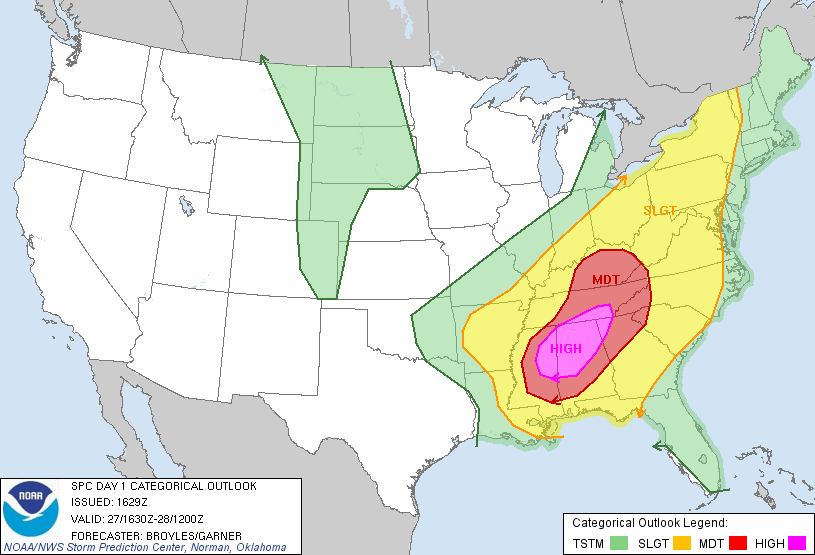
SPC Outlook shows a High Risk of Severe Weather within the southern U.S

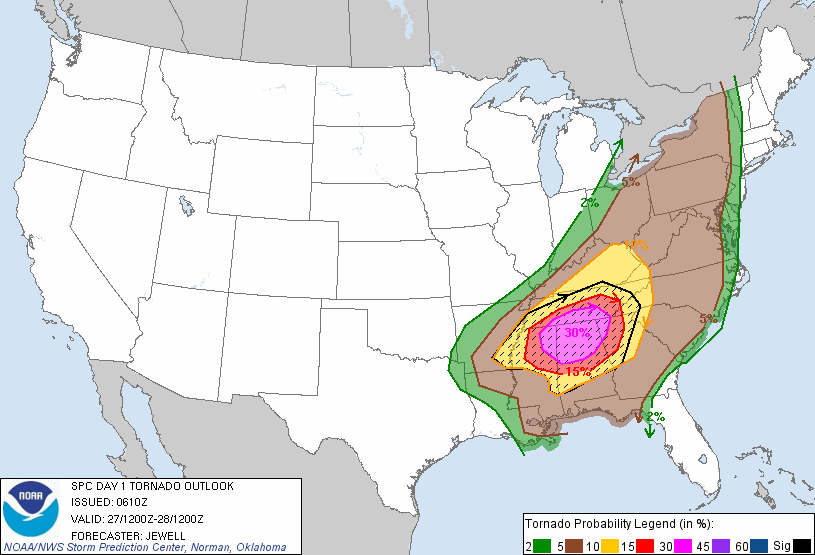
SPC outlook at 06:10 UTC showing a 30% chance for tornadoes in the southern U.S

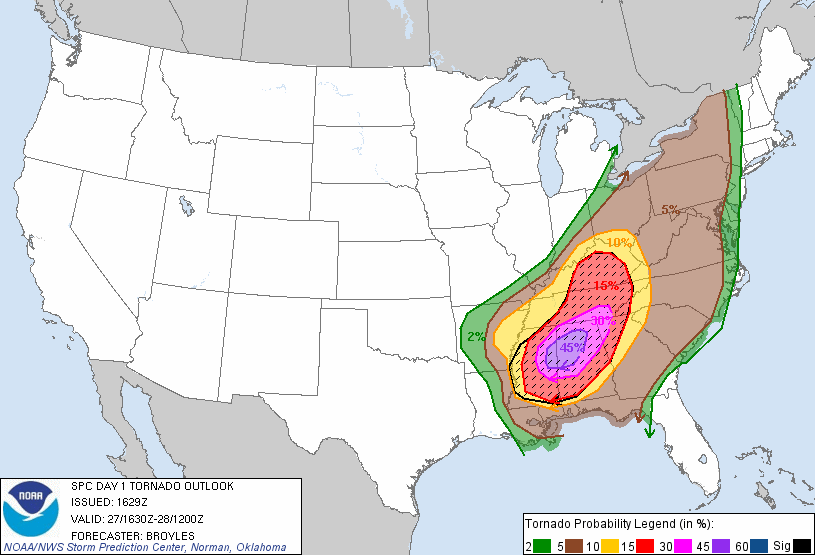
SPC Outlook at 16:30 UTC showing a 45% chance for tornadoes in the southern U.S

Overnight severe weather persisted into the early morning hours of April 27, and would continue virtually unbroken for the remainder of the day. At 06:10 UTC, the SPC issued a second-consecutive, high risk day-one outlook, featuring a 30% hatched risk of tornadoes centered over northern Alabama. At 16:30 UTC (11:30 AM CDT) this region was expanded to include portions of eastern Mississippi, southern Tennessee, and northwest Georgia. Additionally, a rare, 45% hatched risk of tornadoes was introduced along a corridor from Meridian, Mississippi, to Huntsville, Alabama. Environmental conditions continued to be extremely favorable for discrete tornadic supercells throughout the day.

=== Morning squall lines ===
During the early morning, a cold front with several embedded low-pressure areas extended from east Texas northeastward into the Ohio River Valley. An upper-level disturbance that had moved across the frontal boundary the previous evening sparked an area of thunderstorms that morphed into a squall line. This line of severe thunderstorms would produce tornadic activity from the evening on April 26 into the late morning of April 27. Early in the morning, the squall line, packing straight-line winds and numerous embedded tornadoes, moved through Louisiana and Mississippi before proceeding to affect North and Central Alabama and parts of Middle and East Tennessee. The line strengthened as it moved through Alabama, partially due to a high amount of low-level moisture from the Gulf of Mexico and increasing wind shear.

A majority of the tornadoes embedded in this initial squall line were weak, though several were strong and as such caused significant damage. An EF3 tornado caused major damage to homes in Coaling, Alabama, and an EF2 and an EF3 tornado produced severe damage and a fatality near Eupora, Mississippi. Another EF3 tornado resulted in heavy damage in downtown Cordova, Alabama, which was struck by a violent EF4 tornado later that afternoon. An EF2 tornado also struck Cahaba Heights near Birmingham. One embedded cell began producing tornadoes just after 5:00 a.m. CDT (10:00 UTC), starting with an EF1 tornado striking Berry, Alabama. This was soon followed by the Cordova EF3 tornado. As the line entered Cullman County, Alabama, the cell, a mesoscale convective vortex (MCV), began exhibiting a comma head appearance and produced another long-tracked EF2 tornado that struck the town of Hanceville, killing one person. The MCV would then produce 13 tornadoes (most rated EF1) to the northeast in Marshall County, many of which occurred simultaneously. Two more tornadoes were produced as the comma head-shaped embedded cell continued northeast along the Jackson/DeKalb county line, including a long-track EF1 tornado that resulted in a fatality near Pisgah. The same area was impacted later that day by a high-end EF4 tornado. Another EF1 tornado occurred in Dade County, Georgia, with the cell, and six more tornadoes struck Hamilton County, Tennessee, five of which were in the Chattanooga area. The 26th and final tornado produced by the MCV was an EF2 tornado in northern Bradley County, Tennessee, which hit at 9:45 a.m. EDT (13:45 UTC). The initial storms caused widespread power and telephone line outages across Alabama and Tennessee. This line of storms also caused some NOAA weather radio transmitter sites to stop functioning for the remainder of the outbreak. Because of this, more than one million customers were without power and had no warning of any approaching tornadoes later that day.

From the late morning to the early afternoon, another squall line moved through northern parts of Mississippi and Alabama as high wind shear and low-level moisture persisted. However, this time several discrete supercells developed along and in front of the line, spawning seven weak tornadoes across Morgan, Limestone, and Madison Counties in northern Alabama around noon that day.

=== Afternoon supercells ===
Supercells firing in Mississippi during the afternoon of April 27

After around an hour-long lull in activity, the most intense supercells of the outbreak began to fire off in Mississippi and progress eastward through the afternoon and early evening. Benefiting from the extreme instability and wind shear, these supercells near-instantly became tornadic and minutes later began producing strong to violent tornadoes. The Storm Prediction Center, seeing that this already unstable atmosphere was projected to become even more so throughout the afternoon and early evening, issued yet another PDS tornado watch at around 1:45 PM CDT (1845 GMT) for most of Alabama and into portions of Mississippi, Tennessee, and extreme northwestern Georgia. A widespread complex of supercellular storms sprawled over Mississippi and Alabama, producing tornadoes ranging from weak and short-lived to violent and long-tracked throughout the afternoon.

At around 2:30 PM CDT (1930 GMT), as instability, wind shear and already ample low-level moisture continued to increase, a tornado emergency was declared for Neshoba, Kemper, Noxubee and Winston counties in Mississippi, as a large and extremely destructive tornado was reported on the ground by emergency spotters and storm chasers, as well as a camera atop a television tower from ABC affiliate WTOK-TV in nearby Meridian, Mississippi. While it just barely missed the town of Philadelphia, Mississippi proper to the northeast, this EF5 tornado (the first of four to touch down that day) caused incredible damage to the northeastern portion of Neshoba County, as pavement was torn off roads, vehicles were thrown, and the ground was scoured out to a depth of 2 feet (0.61 m) by the tornado. Three people died when a mobile home was thrown 300 yards (270 m) into a wooded area, obliterating it in the process.

The tornadoes continued tracking through central Alabama that afternoon and into the early evening. At around 5:10 p.m. CDT (22:10 UTC), a very large and exceptionally destructive tornado struck Tuscaloosa, Alabama, and about 40 minutes later, that same tornado struck the northern suburbs of nearby Birmingham. The same supercell produced another EF4 tornado later that evening that killed 22 people and struck the Ohatchee, Alabama, area and eventually crossed into Georgia, causing additional damage near Cave Spring before dissipating. Further to the south, a mile-wide EF3 tornado killed 7 people in mostly rural areas and caused major damage in the small town of Eoline. The final EF5 tornado of the day caused remarkable damage in and around the town of Rainsville, Alabama, killing 25 people before crossing into Georgia and dissipating. Tornadoes continued touching down further to the northeast as the sun set, particularly in Georgia. This included a long-tracked EF4 tornado that caused major damage in Ringgold, Georgia, Apison, Tennessee, and Cleveland, Tennessee, killing 20 people along the path. After dark, violent tornadoes continued to touch down, and a nighttime EF4 tornado destroyed many lakeside homes at Lake Martin in eastern Alabama, killing seven people. Additional strong nighttime tornadoes occurred in Georgia, including an EF3 tornado that killed two people in Barnesville, and another EF3 tornado that destroyed homes and killed one person at Lake Burton.

=== Continued activity farther east ===
Powerful tornadoes touched down across Tennessee as well that evening. A violent EF4 tornado struck the community of New Harmony, Tennessee, where homes were leveled, vehicles were tossed, and four people were killed. On January 23, 2025, Anthony W. Lyza with the National Severe Storms Laboratory along with Harold E. Brooks and Makenzie J. Kroca with the University of Oklahoma's School of Meteorology published a paper to the American Meteorological Society, where they stated the tornado in New Harmony was an "EF5 candidate". The paper was of the opinion that the EF5 starting wind speed should be 190 mph (310 km/h) instead of 201 mph (323 km/h).

Two EF3 tornadoes crossed paths in Greene and Washington counties (coming a couple of hours apart), resulting in eight fatalities. The rural communities of Horse Creek and Camp Creek suffered major damage from those tornadoes late that evening. A very large EF4 wedge tornado leveled a mile-wide swath of forest through 14 miles (23 km) of Great Smoky Mountains National Park, resulting in many trails being closed. At Chilhowee Lake, large metal power line truss towers were torn and thrown from their concrete supports that they were anchored to.

A secondary area of severe weather also developed that afternoon and evening along a corridor extending from central and northern Virginia northward through Maryland, Pennsylvania, and New York, continuing into early April 28. Many tornadoes touched down in this area as well. Most of these tornadoes were weak, though an EF2 tornado touched down near the town of Halifax, Virginia, and caused severe damage to homes in the area, resulting in one death. Tornado alerts were issued for Southern Ontario as far north as Ottawa as well; one tornado was later confirmed in Fergus, Ontario.

=== Overview ===
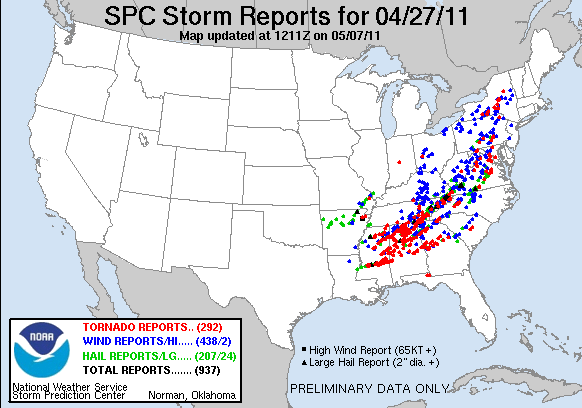
SPC Storm Reports for April 27

The Storm Prediction Center received 292 reports of tornadoes in the preceding 24 hours. In addition to setting the record for most tornadoes in a calendar day (223; midnight to midnight CDT (05:00 – 05:00 UTC)), it also broke the record for the most tornado touchdowns in any 24-hour period with 226 from 12:40 a.m. to 12:40 a.m. CDT (05:40 – 05:40 UTC) April 27–28, breaking the old 24-hour record of 148 set by the 1974 Super Outbreak. Of those 226 tornadoes, 59 touched down in Alabama and 83 began in Tennessee, accounting for 62.8 percent of the tornadoes that touched down on April 27. On April 27 alone, the National Weather Service in Huntsville, Alabama, issued 92 tornado warnings, 31 severe thunderstorm warnings, and seven flash flood warnings.

== April 28 ==
The Storm Prediction Center issued a Slight risk of severe storms for the entire Atlantic Coast on April 28, as the tornadoes that spawned were projected to be weaker and far more isolated. Despite this, the secondary portion of the outbreak that had begun producing scattered tornadoes throughout the Mid-Atlantic and East Coast regions the previous evening intensified during the early morning, producing numerous tornadoes. A particularly active region, in which there were some strong tornadoes, was the I-81 corridor extending from southwest Virginia, northward through the Shenandoah Valley and into Pennsylvania, and New York. This included the deadly EF3 tornado that struck the town of Glade Spring, Virginia, very early in the morning, where three people died. Tornadoes were also reported in Florida, Georgia, South Carolina, North Carolina, and Maryland. Most of these tornadoes were weak. Although tornado watches were issued, no tornadoes were spotted in New Jersey or Washington, D.C. In the wake of the tornadoes and severe thunderstorms, widespread flooding hit the Midwest, South, and Eastern Seaboard, with extensive flood and flash flood warnings issued. The last tornadoes of the outbreak touched down that afternoon in eastern North Carolina, which was hard hit in the April 16 outbreak, though the tornadoes that impacted the area this time around were weak. After spawning one final round of isolated non-tornadic thunderstorms across central Florida that night into April 29, the system finally moved out into the Atlantic Ocean, having caused a great deal of devastation on its 4-day trek throughout the central and eastern US.

== See also ==
- List of North American tornadoes and tornado outbreaks
