= 2011 Sawyerville–Eoline tornado =

2011 EF3 tornado in Alabama, U.S.

- The long-track tornado seen from Tishabee

Meteorological history
- Formed: April 27, 2011, 5:30 p.m. CDT (UTC−05:00)
- Dissipated: April 27, 2011, 6:55 p.m. CDT (UTC−05:00)
- Duration: 1 hour, 25 minutes

EF3 tornado
- on the Enhanced Fujita scale
- Highest winds: 145 mph (233 km/h)

Overall effects
- Fatalities: 7
- Injuries: 52
- Part of the 2011 Super Outbreak and Tornadoes of 2011

On the afternoon of April 27, 2011, a large, long-tracked, and destructive EF3 tornado, known as the Sawyerville–Eoline tornado, moved across Central Alabama, in the United States, moving through areas near numerous towns along its 72.1-mile (116.0 km) track, including Tishabee, Sawyerville, Havana and Eoline. The tornado killed seven, injured 52, and impacted hundreds of structures. It occurred as part of the largest tornado outbreak in modern history, and was one of 21 EF3-rated tornadoes to be confirmed that day.

The tornado first touched down in Greene County, immediately producing EF2-rated damage to areas directly northwest of Tishabee. Damage was inflicted to several structures and trees as the tornado moved into the Sawyerville area, where EF3 damage was inflicted to more structures. The tornado maintained a wide and long swath of EF3 intensity at its center as it hit Eoline. The tornado would gradually weaken before lifting east of West Blocton. The tornado devastated areas in Central Alabama which it impacted; seven people were killed. The tornado had maximum estimated windspeeds of 145 miles per hour (233 km/h), classifying it as an EF3 tornado on the Enhanced Fujita scale.

== Meteorological synopsis ==
=== Setup ===
The environmental conditions leading up to the 2011 Super Outbreak were among the "most conducive to violent tornadoes ever documented". On April 25, a vigorous upper-level shortwave trough moved into the Southern Plains states. Ample instability, low-level moisture, and wind shear all fueled a significant tornado outbreak from Texas to Tennessee; at least 64 tornadoes touched down on this day. An area of low pressure consolidated over Texas on April 26 and traveled east while the aforementioned shortwave trough traversed the Mississippi and Ohio River valleys. Another 50 tornadoes touched down on this day. The multi-day outbreak culminated on April 27 with the most violent day of tornadic activity since the 1974 Super Outbreak. Multiple episodes of tornadic activity ensued with two waves of mesoscale convective systems in the morning hours followed by a widespread outbreak of supercells from Mississippi to North Carolina during the afternoon into the evening.

Tornadic activity on April 27 was precipitated by a 995 mbar (hPa; 29.39 inHg) surface low situated over Kentucky and a deep, negatively tilted (aligned northwest to southeast) trough over Arkansas and Louisiana. A strong southwesterly surface jet intersected these systems at a 60° angle, an ageostrophic flow that led to storm-relative helicity values in excess of 500 m^{2}s^{−2}—indicative of extreme wind shear and a very high potential for rotating updrafts within supercells. Ample moisture from the Gulf of Mexico was brought north across the Deep South, leading to daytime high temperatures of 77 to 81 °F (25 to 27 °C) and dewpoints of 66 to 72 °F (19 to 22 °C). Furthermore, convective available potential energy (CAPE) values reached 2,500–3,000 J/kg^{−1}.

=== Forecast ===
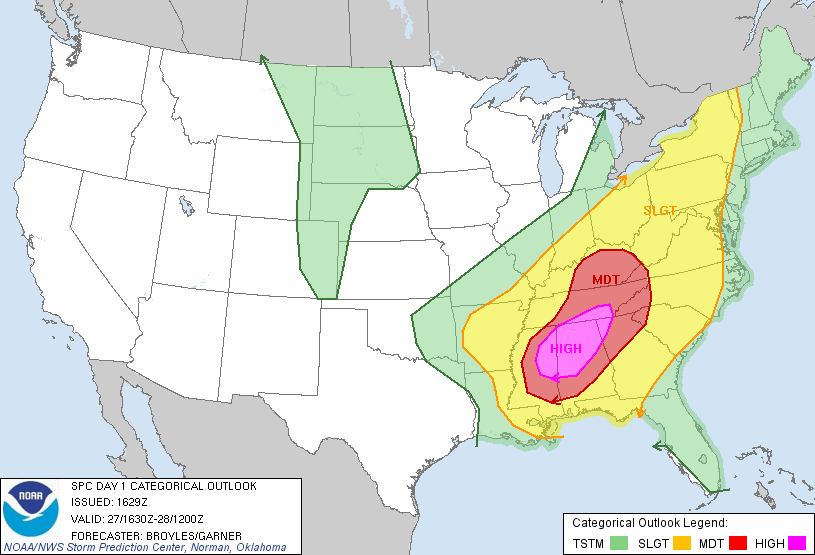
The National Weather Service Storm Prediction Center's Day 1 Convective Outlook for April 27, showing the Categorical Graphic

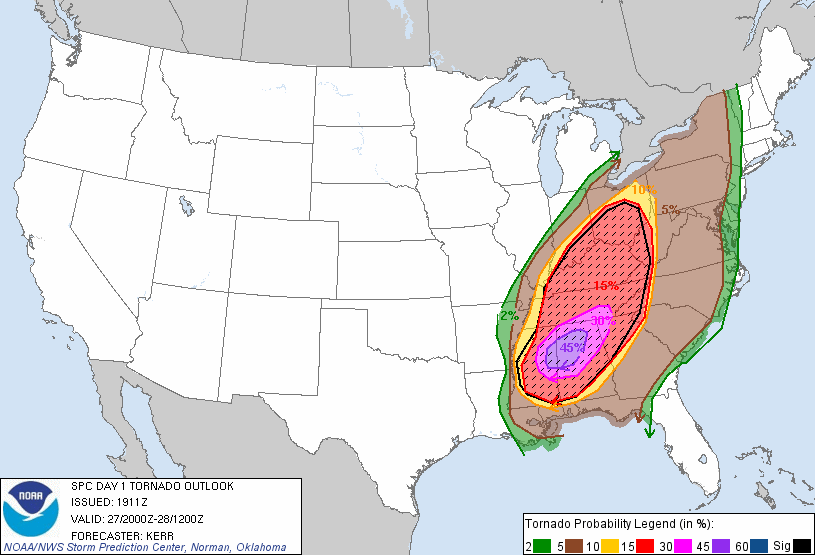
The probability of a tornado within 25 miles of a point (cross-hatched area: 10% or greater probability of EF2+ tornadoes)

On the morning of April 27, a strong cold front with several areas of embedded low pressure extended from the Texas Hill Country northeastward towards the Arklatex and the Ozarks, and later into the lower Ohio Valley. Warm moist air was in place due to strong southerly flow ahead of the front over Mississippi, Alabama, and Tennessee. An upper level disturbance sparked a broad area of showers and thunderstorms as it moved across the frontal boundary on the previous evening. The eastern edge of the line of showers and storms continued to move eastward, in concert with the upper disturbance, reaching the northwest Alabama border around 2:00 a.m. CDT.

This produced the last and most violent round of severe weather, which began around 2:30 p.m. CDT for northern Alabama as supercells began to line up to the southwest of the area. During the early afternoon hours, the potential for destructive tornadoes was highlighted by the Storm Prediction Center's upgrade to a high risk for severe weather around 1:00 p.m. CDT. This prompted a particularly dangerous situation (PDS) tornado watch, which was issued for northern Alabama and portions of southern Tennessee at 1:45 p.m. CDT. The bulletin that accompanied the watch read:

THE NWS STORM PREDICTION CENTER HAS ISSUED A TORNADO WATCH FOR PORTIONS OF: MUCH OF ALABAMA, NORTHWEST GEORGIA, SOUTHEAST MISSISSIPPI, SOUTHERN MIDDLE TENNESSEE, EFFECTIVE THIS WEDNESDAY AFTERNOON AND EVENING FROM 145 PM UNTIL 1000 PM CDT.

...THIS IS A PARTICULARLY DANGEROUS SITUATION...

DESTRUCTIVE TORNADOES...LARGE HAIL TO 4 INCHES IN DIAMETER. THUNDERSTORM WIND GUSTS TO 80 MPH...AND DANGEROUS LIGHTNING ARE POSSIBLE IN THESE AREAS.

The potential for tornadoes ramped up from noon through 9:00 p.m. CDT. During this period, much of Alabama experienced numerous supercell thunderstorms that produced numerous tornadoes, including the Sawyerville tornado.

== Tornado summary ==
- Damage survey track of this tornado (centermost orange line), as well as the tracks of other EF3+ tornadoes that occurred during 2011 Super Outbreak. (Interactive map, click or tap to view in detail); View mapdata Key EF0 65–85 mph (105–137 km/h); EF1 86–110 mph (138–177 km/h); EF2 111–135 mph (179–217 km/h); EF3 136–165 mph (219–266 km/h); EF4 166–200 mph (267–322 km/h); EF5 ≥201 mph (323 km/h)

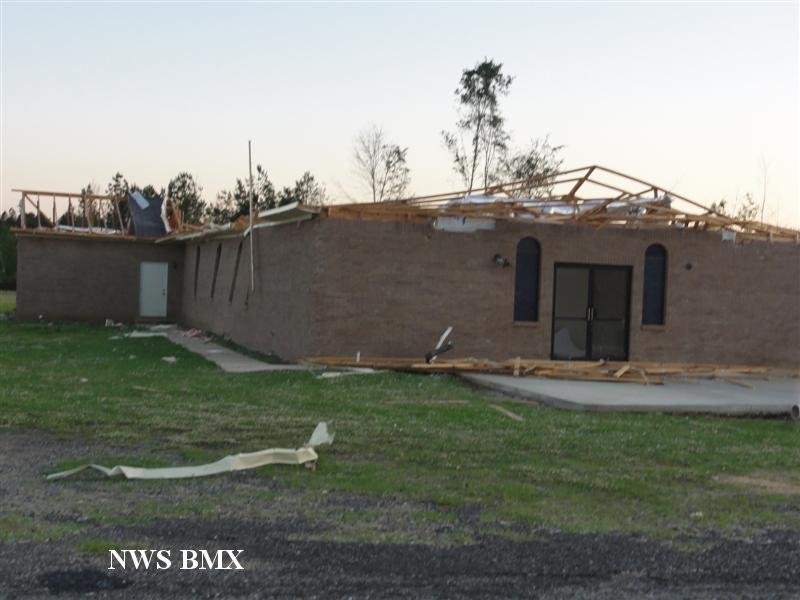
A deroofed building near Tishabee

The tornado first touched down near Head Drive and County Road 69 in extreme southwest Greene County to the west-southwest of Tishabee, near the Sumter County border, at 5:30 p.m. CDT (22:30 UTC). EF1-rated damage was immediately inflicted to mobile homes along County Road 69, and a barn received damage near December Lane. The tornado reached EF2 intensity as it crossed County Road 79, where it damaged a barn, destroyed two small churches, and damaged at least four mobile homes. Further EF1 damage was inflicted to softwood trees near the intersection of County Road 69 and County Road 70. The tornado continued to impact areas just north of Tishabee before crossing County Road 72 at EF2 intensity. Further northeast, the tornado passed over Reed Lake and the Acron Creek, before impacting County Road 50. It then crossed the McConnico Creek, moving northeast and hitting County Road 49.

EF2 damage was inflicted to several double-wide mobile homes as the tornado moved over County Road 48. After impacting County Road 20, the tornado inflicted EF2 damage to a metal outbuilding, sheering steel beams off its concrete foundation and removing both the walls and roof from the structure. While crossing U.S. 43, the tornado continued to cause substantial roof and wall damage to several brick buildings and homes. Hundreds of trees were downed in this area as well. More EF2 damage was inflicted to a metal building system south of the Dollarhide Creek, and a building suffered an exterior wall collapse nearby. Windspeeds in this area were estimated by the National Weather Service office in Birmingham, Alabama (NWS BMX) to have been as high as 135 miles per hour (217 km/h). Two people sustained minor injuries in Greene County as the tornado continued along a primarily rural path northeast, moving across the Black Warrior River and into Hale County.

=== Track near Sawyerville and Hale County ===
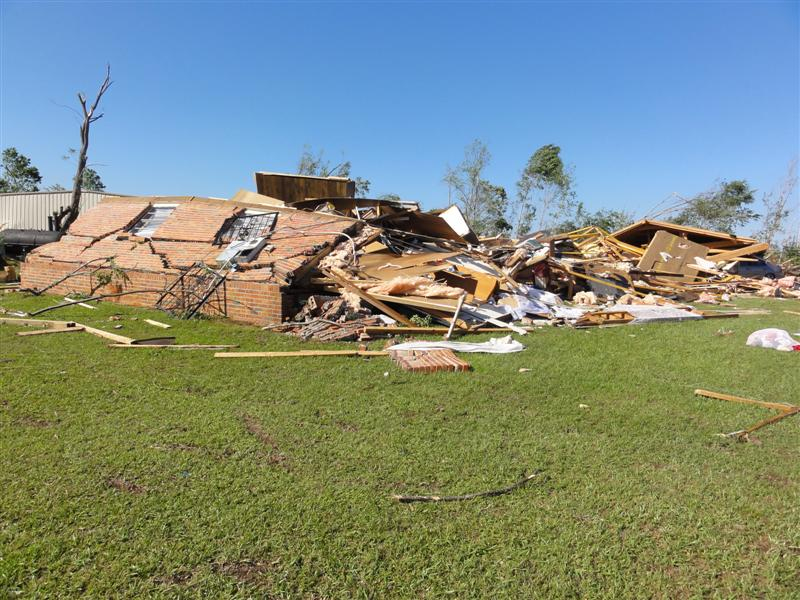
EF3-rated damage to a brick home near Sawyerville

The tornado entered Hale County along the Wrights Creek located west of Sawyerville, continuing to move through sparsely-populated rural areas. The tornado crossed Erie Road at EF2 intensity and the intersection of County Road 92 and Erie Road to the north, nearing areas directly north of Sawyerville. It impacted the Lawson Lakes and moved over the Wrights Creek a second time, and to the northeast crossed over Coleman Road and Alabama State Highway 14. The northern portion of Webb Lane was also struck by the outer portions of the tornado. It first reached EF3 intensity east of County Road 17, inflicting heavy damage to a mobile home along County Road 18. Softwood trees were snapped at EF2 intensity on the western portions of the road prior to the tornado reaching EF3 intensity. A brick home, also located on County Road 18, sustained heavy damage, with all walls of the home collapsing in the tornadic winds. Several more mobile homes received EF3-rated damage nearby before the tornado crossed over County Road 30. The tornado weakened to EF2 intensity north of Tree Top Road, before restrengthening along County Road 21 and the Calwell Creek area. Several brick homes were completely destroyed at EF3 intensity, and EF1 to EF2 damage was inflicted to homes south of County Road 32. It retained EF3-level strength as it tracked northeast on Dunson Road, before bending steel poles on Raspberry Road. As this point in its track, the tornado was moving through rural areas south and east of the small communities of Harper Hill and Ingram. On Hubbard Road, a mobile home was completely destroyed at EF3 intensity and softwood trees were snapped on the southern edge of the tornado's path. EF1 damage was inflicted to homes and hardwood trees as the tornado crossed County Road 31, before the tornado began moving parallel to the Fivemile Creek. The tornado moved across the northern portions of Strawberry Road as it moved northeast, before passing a short distance south of Ingram. On County Road 29, the tornado impacted a wood-framed church and twisted the undercarriage of at least one mobile home. The tornado then moved over Hoggle Road, before impacting the Latner Branch Creek. The tornado maintained EF3 intensity as it crossed Clary Hill Road and then over the southern portions of NF Road 708, continuing to move northeast. EF2-rated damage was inflicted to pine trees on County Road 49 north of the Payne Lake. A wedding photo in Sawyerville set aloft by the tornado was found across the state in St. Clair County.

=== Damage in Eoline ===
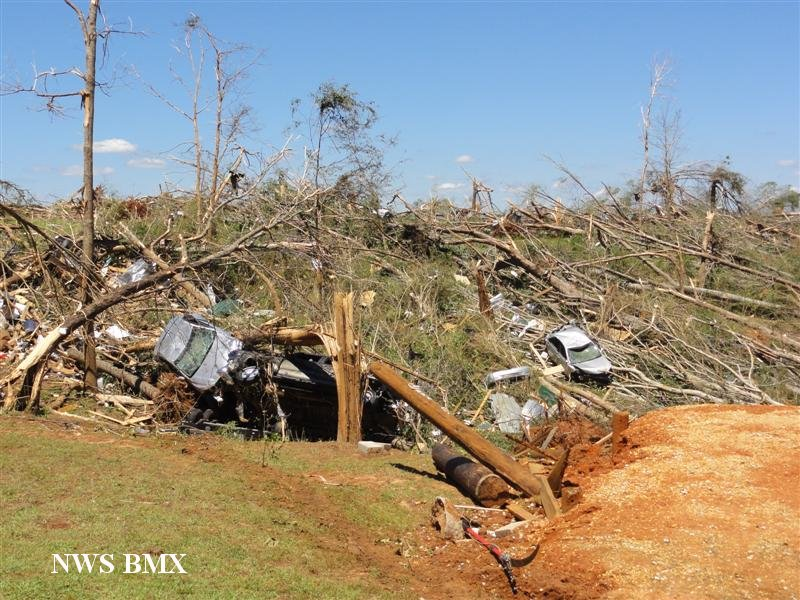
Damaged home near Water Oak

Leaving behind six fatalities and forty more injuries, the tornado maintained its intensity as it moved into the Talladega National Forest. It downed a significant number of trees before moving into Bibb County north of Alabama State Highway 25. The tornado moved over Road 718 in extreme western Bibb County before crossing Road 727 north of Mertz. It impacted Caddis Road in the National Forest, maintaining EF3 intensity at its center. The tornado moved along West Eoline Road as it neared the communities of Eoline, Pleasant Hill, Ingate and Choctaw Hills. EF3-rated damage was inflicted to mobile homes along Murphy Road as the tornado moved into the southern portions of Eoline. On Mooney Creek Lane, the tornado destroyed the Eoline Volunteer Fire Department and damaged the vinyl siding of numerous homes; a tree fell on one property. Twelve people survived the tornado by taking shelter in the station's hallway. Additional EF3 damage was inflicted to hardwood trees, which were uprooted and snapped inside wind speeds that were estimated to have been as high as 125 miles per hour (201 km/h). In Eoline alone, around one dozen mobile homes and single-family site-built homes were destroyed, while many more sustained anywhere from minor to major damage.

One person was killed in Eoline, in a vehicle near the destroyed fire department. Ten others were injured before the tornado crossed U.S. Highway 82 at EF3 intensity, shifting an entire home off its foundation along the highway. To the north, large hardwood trees were uprooted on Eoline Road. The tornado weakened as it crossed Countryside Road, although it still retained EF2-equivalent strength. It then moved south of Scottsvile, which was directly impacted by an EF1-rated tornado on April 15, during a separate tornado outbreak earlier in the month.

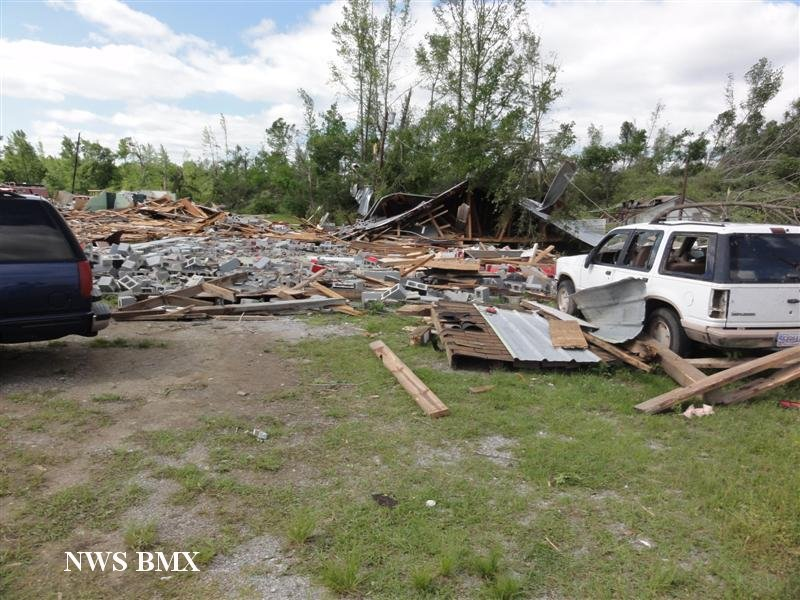
Heavy damage to the Eoline Volunteer Fire Department

Northeast of Eoline, the tornado weakened to EF2 intensity, continuing to cause significant damage as it crossed County Road 9, Alabama State Highway 5, and County Road 26, south of West Blocton. Several mobile homes and site-built homes were either destroyed or sustained major damage. Along the path, thousands of trees were downed. The tornado continued to weaken as it moved to the east of West Blocton, continuing to knock down trees. More trees were downed as the tornado crossed the Cahaba River and lifted just northeast of Marvel at 6:55 p.m. CDT (23:55 UTC), not far from the Shelby County border.

The tornado was rated as an EF3, with maximum sustained winds of 145 mph (233 km/h). It remained on the ground for almost an hour and a half, traversing 72.13 miles (116.08 km), being, at times, about one mile (1.6 km) wide. In total, seven people were killed and at least 52 others were injured. The storm that produced the Sawyerville EF3 later produced an EF0 tornado east of Pell City, Alabama.

== Aftermath ==
=== Damage, recovery efforts and studies ===
Immediately following the tornado, the Greensboro Recreational Center in Greensboro, Alabama provided food, clothing and other household items for victims of the tornado. The annual "Spring Ding-a-Ling-Dong" helped raise money that went towards the relief efforts in Sawyerville.

The tornado was rated as an EF3, with maximum sustained winds of 145 mph (233 km/h). It remained on the ground for almost an hour and a half, traversing 72.13 miles (116.08 km), being, at times, about one mile (1.6 km) wide. Approximately 30% of the tornado's path consisted of EF0-rated damage indicators (DIs), 25% contained EF1-rated DIs, 28% contained EF2-rated DIs and 7% contained EF3-rated DIs on the Damage Assessment Toolkit. A May 2014 study by researchers at the Florida State University found that the tornado had a kinetic energy level of 123 terajoules, twice as much as the amount of kinetic energy that was released during the 1945 nuclear bombing of Hiroshima, Japan. The kinetic energy was the highest observed in the study, above the levels of the Hackleburg–Phil Campbell EF5 tornado, Shoal Creek Valley–Ohatchee EF4 tornado, Smithville EF5 tornado from the same day, and the 2013 Moore, Oklahoma EF5 tornado.

In 2024, four new storm shelters were scheduled to be constructed in Hale County. The county's Emergency Management Agency Director Russell Weeden stated that "I feel like those injuries and fatalities could have been prevented if we had a safe place for them to go," in relation to the 2011 tornado and separate tornadoes that hit the county in 2023. The shelters were planned to have been open in October 2024.

=== Casualties ===
Seven people were killed by the tornado; six in Hale County and one in Bibb County:

List of fatalities from the tornado
Name	Age	County	Community	Circumstances of death	Ref.
Jerry Lee Hodge	64	Hale	Sawyerville	Hodge died shortly after the tornado destroyed his mobile home in Sawyerville.	
Henry Lewis Jr.	26	Hale	Sawyerville	Lewis Jr. was killed when the tornado impacted his home. He had a broken leg at the time of the tornado, causing him to stay in his living room.	
Frankie Joe Lunsford	55	Hale	Sawyerville	Lunsford died when the tornado struck his home.	
Elizabeth White	25	Hale	Sawyerville	White was killed in her home while on a phone call.	
Cora L. Brown	68	Hale	Greensboro area	Both were killed when the tornado struck the mobile home which they lived in; both bodies were found approximately 0.25–0.5 miles (0.40–0.80 km) from their residence.	
Gerald C. Brown	70	Hale	Greensboro area	Both were killed when the tornado struck the mobile home which they lived in; both bodies were found approximately 0.25–0.5 miles (0.40–0.80 km) from their residence.	
Ricky Paul Smith	55	Bibb	Eoline	Smith's car was blown off Alabama State Highway 82 as the tornado impacted Eoline, killing him. One other person in the vehicle survived.	

== See also ==
- List of tornadoes in the 2011 Super Outbreak
  - 2011 Cullman–Arab tornado – an EF4 tornado that killed six
  - 2011 Tuscaloosa–Birmingham tornado – an EF4 tornado that devastated Tuscaloosa, Alabama at the same time the Sawyerville tornado was on the ground

== References and sources ==
=== Sources ===
- Fricker, T.; Elsner, J.B.; Camp, P.; Jagger, T.H. (June 1, 2014). "Empirical estimates of kinetic energy from some recent U.S. tornadoes" (PDF). Geophysical Research Letters. 41 (12): 4343–4344. Bibcode:2014GeoRL..41.4340F. doi:10.1002/2014GL060441.
