= Jacob Neff =

Jacob Neff may refer to:

- Jacob H. Neff (1830–1909), American politician, Lieutenant Governor of California
- Jacob G. Neff (1840–1925), American politician in the Virginia House of Delegates
