= Sawyerville, Alabama tornado =

Sawyerville, Alabama tornado may refer to:

- 2011 Sawyerville–Eoline tornado
- 2021 Sawyerville–Columbiana tornado
- 2022 Sawyerville tornado
