= Umbria Plantation =

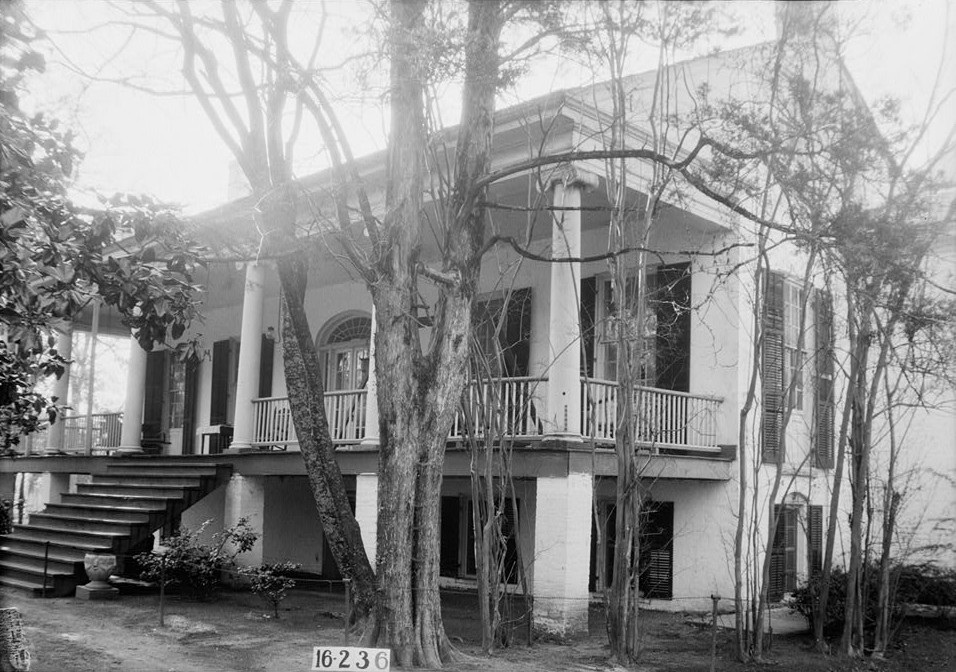
- Front facade of the main house in 1934
- Interactive map of Umbria Plantation
- Nearest city: Sawyerville, Alabama
- Coordinates: 32.74847°N 87.72804°W
- Built: 1833–1850s
- Demolished: 1971
- Architectural style: Greek Revival

Umbria Plantation, also known as the Samuel Pickens Plantation, was a historic cotton plantation and Greek Revival-style plantation house near what is now Sawyerville, Alabama. The plantation was established by Samuel Pickens, the younger brother of Alabama's third governor, Israel Pickens. The house was an unusual example of a raised basement plantation house built on a U-shaped plan. It was recorded by the Historic American Buildings Survey during the 1930s. It was destroyed in a fire, December 29, 1971.

== History ==
Samuel Pickens was the son of Samuel W. Pickens of Virginia and Jane Carrigan of North Carolina. He was born in Cabarrus County, North Carolina in 1791. He and brothers Robert, Israel, John, Robert, and William had all relocated to the western Black Belt of Alabama by the 1820s. Most of them established plantations near Umbria in Greene County (now part of Hale).

Pickens married Mary Everard Meade on September 11, 1830 in Greene County. Construction of the main house at Umbria began around this time. Mary died in 1831, while construction was still underway. Pickens then married to Selina Louisa Lenoir, also a native of Cabarrus County, North Carolina, in 1832. That had one son, Thomas Lenoir Pickens, in 1833. The house was completed by about this time.

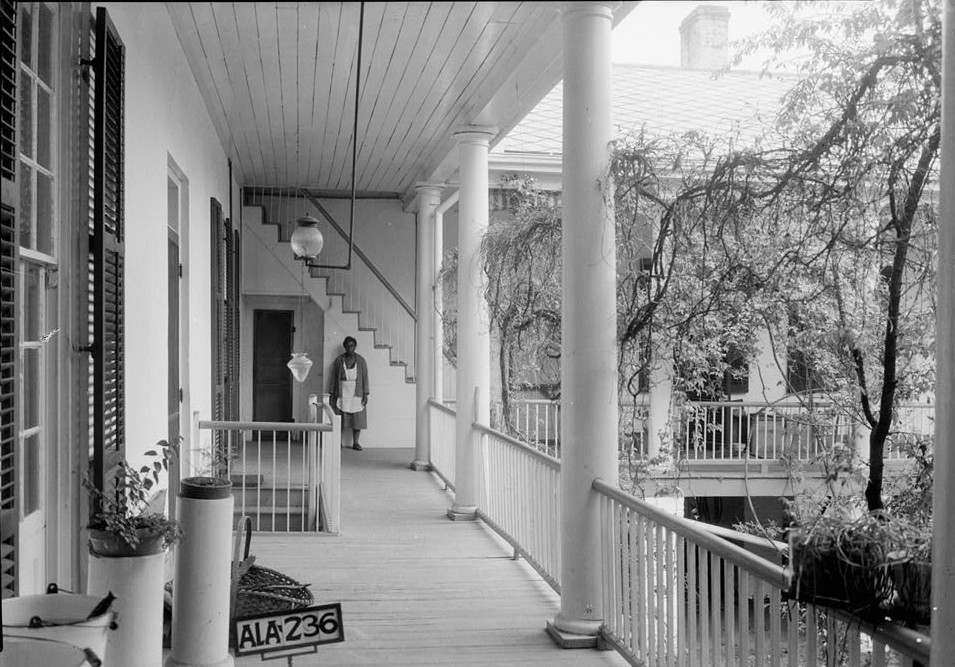
The rear gallery and courtyard.

Selina too died in 1839, leaving Pickens twice a widower. He remarried yet again, this time to Mary Gaillard Thomas of Charleston, South Carolina in 1840. They had several children, including James, Samuel, William, John, Mary, Louisa, and Israel. Pickens acquired additional plantations and the family's wealth grew. Two large wings, each almost as large as the original front portion of the house, were added to each side of the house by roughly 1850. Samuel Pickens died on June 23, 1855, leaving his widow an estate that was valued at nearly half a million dollars in 1860 and over 200 slaves. His sons took over the daily operations of the plantations until called to serve in the Civil War.

The house stayed in the Pickens family for several additional generations and was extensively renovated in the mid-twentieth century after being sold out of the family. It was destroyed by fire on December 30, 1971. Today the only reminders of what was once at site is a fence and crumbling brick foundations.

== Architecture ==
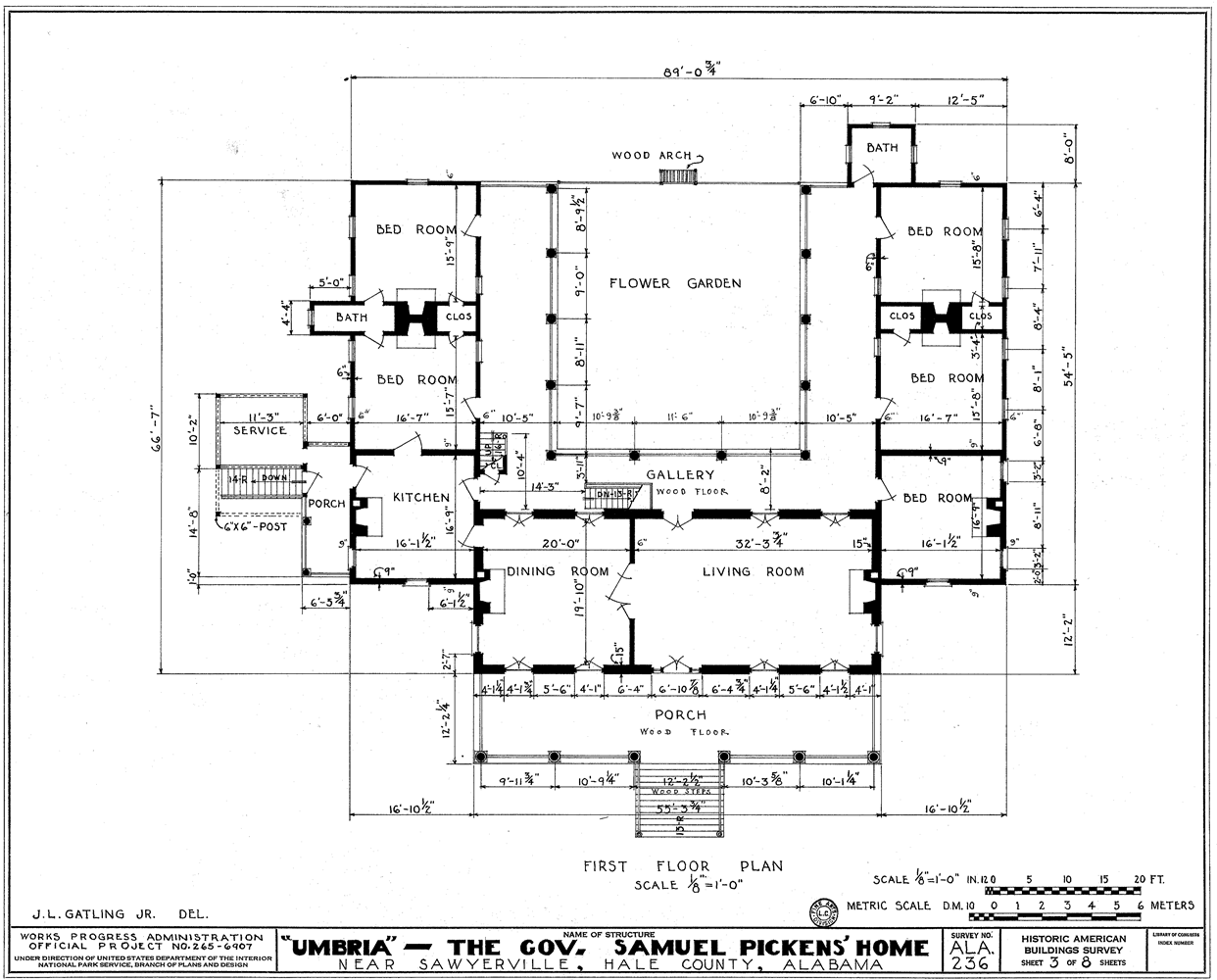
This floor plan of the principal floor, shows the U-shaped layout and central rear courtyard.

The main house at Umbria began as a raised Carolina-type cottage during the 1830s, with a principal floor over a full, ground-level brick basement. The basement level was fronted by a full-width, sunken loggia with a brick floor. The basement level contained a central hall entered through a central hall. Two rooms, each with its own fireplace, were located on each side of the hall.

The principal floor was fronted with a full-width porch supported by six Ionic columns set directly under the main roof. This floor contained four rooms, with the central doorway accessing a large parlor from the front porch. The double-leaf central doors featured a finely detailed fanlight and sidelights. An additional entry point from the porch was located to either side of the main doorway in the form of jib window.

By the early 1850s the house had been greatly expanded to include two long rear wings attached to the rear corners of the original house. These matched the house in style and scale, however, they were built on piers rather than an enclosed basement. They each contained two large bedrooms with fireplaces. A gallery on three sides with twelve Doric columns wrapped the house around the rear courtyard.

Additional structures on the grounds that were still present during the Historic American Buildings Survey in the mid-1930s included a barn, plantation office, a plantation schoolhouse, and three other plantation outbuildings. The schoolhouse survived the fire and was donated to the former Gulf States Paper Company in Tuscaloosa for relocation and preservation after the fire. It has now been donated to the Tuscaloosa County Preservation Society.
