= Charles McGruder =

Charles McGruder Sr.
- Born: Charles "Chas" Magruder c. 1829; Sawyerville, Alabama
- Died: Sawyerville, Alabama
- Other name: Charles Magruder
- Spouses: Rachel Hill; Mary May

Charles McGruder Sr. was born to Ned and Mariah Magruder as a slave in North Carolina in about 1829. Charles' owners used him as a stud, a human breeder, in order to increase their slave population. Charles ultimately became the father to some one-hundred children and is today the progenitor of thousands of people and hundreds of African-American men with the surname McGruder or Magruder. After the Emancipation Proclamation of 1865, his descendants, most of whom spelled their surname McGruder, settled in Hale and Greene Counties Alabama. Many of them became prominent in the area, particularly in Sawyerville, Alabama.

== DNA Testing ==
DNA testing conducted by J.R. Rothstein, the author of the Alabama Black McGruders, on male descendants of Charles McGruder confirm that he is a direct descendant of Alexander Magruder (1610–1677). This confirms that a white individual fathered one of Charles' ancestors.

== Soul Of The Nation ==
Charles McGruder was depicted on the ABC Special, Soul of the Nation.

== See also ==
- Megan Smolenyak, "Melvina’s Descendants, Michelle Obama’s Cousins"
