= W. A. Sager =

American politician

Member of the Virginia House of Delegates from Shenandoah County
- In office December 4, 1895 – December 1, 1897
- Preceded by: Jacob G. Neff
- Succeeded by: J. M. Bauserman

Personal details
- Born: Washington Abel Sager; October 18, 1850
- Died: March 18, 1905 (aged 54)
- Resting place: Sager Cemetery, Alonzaville, Virginia, U. S.
- Party: Republican (Prohibitionist)

Washington Abel Sager (November 18, 1850 – March 18, 1905) was an American politician who served in the Virginia House of Delegates.

== Political career ==
In September 1895, the Republicans, Populists and Prohibitionists of Shenandoah County gathered to nominate a candidate to the Virginia House of Delegates. While the Republican James G. McCune was expected to win, the Prohibitionists had a majority and Sager was nominated.

Under the banner of the Honest Election Party, Sager was elected to the House in November 1895. McCune was elected State Senator for the county under the same banner.

== Personal life ==
Sager was married twice, having at least five sons with his first wife, and four with his second.

On March 18, 1905, he died at his home near Woodstock. He had been ill for the previous week.
