= McGruder =

McGruder is a surname that refers to:

Persons

- Aaron McGruder (b. 1974), American cartoonist
- Charles McGruder, progenitor of hundreds of African-Americans with the surname Magruder or McGruder
- Jeanette McGruder (b. 1954), American singer
- Jessie McGruder, American politician
- Lynn McGruder (b. 1982), American football player
- Mike "Scooter" McGruder (b. 1964), American football player
- Rodney McGruder (b. 1991), American basketball player

Fictional characters

- Judge McGruder, fictional character in the Judge Dredd stories
