= Caleb Clarke Magruder Jr. =

American politician and lawyer (1839–1923)

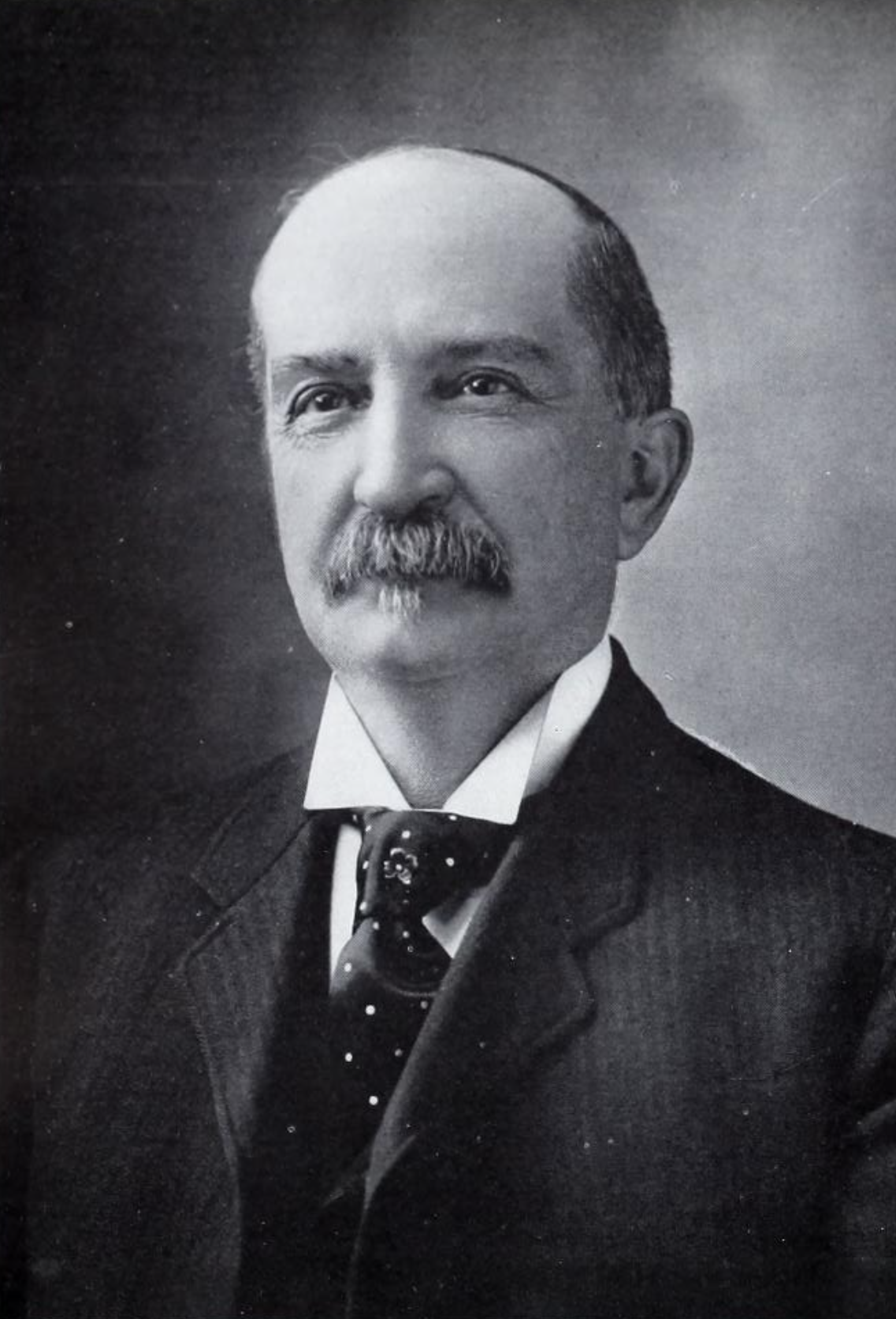
- Magruder in 1914 publication

Member of the Maryland House of Delegates
- In office 1867

Personal details
- Born: January 9, 1839 Upper Marlboro, Maryland, U.S.
- Died: June 2, 1923 (aged 84) Baltimore, Maryland, U.S.
- Resting place: Magruder family graveyard Prince George's County, Maryland, U.S.
- Party: Democratic
- Spouse: Elizabeth Rice Nallie (m. 1868; died 1922)
- Children: 5
- Relatives: Richard H. Magruder (cousin)
- Education: Georgetown University (AB, AM); University of Virginia School of Law
- Occupation: Politician; lawyer

Caleb Clarke Magruder Jr. (January 9, 1839 – June 2, 1923) was a politician and lawyer from Maryland. He served in the Maryland House of Delegates in 1867 and as clerk in the Maryland Court of Appeals from 1907 to 1923.

== Early life ==
Caleb Clarke Magruder Jr. was born on January 9, 1839, in Upper Marlboro, Maryland, to Mary Sprigg (née Belt) and Caleb Clarke Magruder. His father was a lawyer in Prince George's County and owned slaves. Magruder graduated from Georgetown University with a Bachelor of Arts and Master of Arts and had a law course at University of Virginia School of Law. He was admitted to the bar in Upper Marlboro in 1863.

== Career ==
Magruder was a Democrat. Magruder served in the Maryland House of Delegates, representing Prince George's County, in 1867. He was a member during the ratification of the Maryland Constitution of 1867. In 1881, Magruder was the Democratic nominee for Maryland Senate, but lost to his cousin Richard H. Magruder. IN 1897, Magruder was a nominee for associate judge of the Seventh Judicial Court, but lost to Judge George C. Merrick.

Magruder had a law practice with Joseph S. Wilson. He served as a member and president of the board of trustees of the Marlboro Academy. He also served as town commissioner.

Magruder was elected clerk of the Maryland Court of Appeals on November 5, 1907, for a six-year term. He was re-elected in 1913 and 1919. He served until his death.

== Personal life ==
Magruder married Elizabeth Rice Nalle, daughter of Dr. Richard Thomas Nalle, niece of Philip P. Barbour and great-granddaughter of Thomas Barbour, in 1868. They had five sons, Caleb C. III, Thomas N., M. Hampton, Arthur H. S. and Ernest Pendleton. His wife died in September 1922.

Magruder was a member of the Benevolent and Protective Order of Elks.

Magruder died on June 2, 1923, in Baltimore. He was buried in the Magruder family graveyard in Prince George's County.
