= Jacob G. Neff =

American politician

Member of the Virginia House of Delegates from Shenandoah County
- In office December 6, 1893 – December 4, 1895
- Preceded by: Philip W. Magruder
- Succeeded by: W. A. Sager

Personal details
- Born: Jacob Garber Neff; December 2, 1840
- Died: January 28, 1925 (aged 84)
- Resting place: Mount Jackson Cemetery, Mount Jackson, Virginia
- Party: Democratic

Military service
- Allegiance: Confederate States
- Branch/service: Confederate States Army
- Years of service: 1861–1865
- Rank: Captain
- Battles/wars: American Civil War

Jacob Garber Neff (December 2, 1840 – January 28, 1925) was an American politician who served in the Virginia House of Delegates.

== Military career ==
Neff entered the Confederate States Army and took the rank of captain. He was injured several times during the conflict, but remained in service. He returned to his farm after the war. Soon after, he was made Sheriff for Shenandoah County, but retired early from the position.

== Political career ==
Neff was nominated as the Democratic candidate to represent Shenandoah County in the 1881 Virginia House of Delegates election. His election announcement stated:

Let every man who is opposed to placing the negro above the white man, who is opposed to mixing the negroes and children of poor white men in the same schools, vote for a man that deserves your support, a man who will guard well your interests, who will deal honestly and fairly with the colored man, but who will never consent to place men who pay no taxes in a position where they can assess burdens upon the tax-payers of the State.

He lost the election to George J. Grandstaff, the Readjuster candidate, with 1165 votes compared to his opponent's 1492.

In August 1882, he represented Lee District at the Democratic Convention of Virginia's 7th congressional district. He represented Ashby District in 1893.

=== 1893 election ===
In October 1893, Neff was again nominated as the candidate for Shenandoah County. He beat J. N. Brennan, the Democratic County Chairman, by four votes. The incumbent Delegate, Philip W. Magruder, had previously turned down the nomination for a fourth term. Neff's campaign leaned on his experience as a farmer and convincing other farmers to support him.

He was elected with 1550 votes, being 336 more than his closest opponent, Republican candidate Daniel Spiker.

== Later career ==
In 1902, Neff was president of the Shenandoah Valley Turnpike Company.

== Personal life ==
He resided in Mount Jackson. His daughter, Cora Neff, married P. M. S. Bird Jr. in May 1902.
