= Justice Magruder =

Justice Magruder may refer to:

- Alexander Contee Magruder (c. 1779–1853), judge of the Maryland Court of Appeals
- Benjamin D. Magruder (1838–1910), chief justice of the Illinois Supreme Court
- Daniel Randall Magruder (1835–1915), judge of the Maryland Court of Appeals
