= Sawyerville, Alabama =

Unincorporated community in Alabama, US

- Unincorporated community
- Location within Alabama Location within the United States
- Coordinates: 32°45′06″N 87°43′46″W
- Country: United States
- State: Alabama
- County: Hale
- Elevation: 226 ft (69 m)

Population (2000)
  - Total: 795
- Time zone: UTC-6 (Central (CST))
  - Summer (DST): UTC-5 (CDT)
- ZIP code: 36776
- Area codes: 205, 659

Sawyerville, previously known as Sawyers Depot, is an unincorporated community in west-central Hale County, Alabama and is a part of the Tuscaloosa metropolitan area. It derives its name from the town's first post master. The community is rural and came to flourish due to its proximity to the railroad that once traveled through it. The community covers the historic area of the county once called Hollow Square and includes the abandoned town site of Erie, the former county seat of Greene County. It also includes the communities of Wedgeworth, Melton, Warrior Dam, and Mason Bend. The area was the site of several Pickens family plantations, most notably those of early Alabama governor, Israel Pickens, and his younger brother, Samuel Pickens. The Samuel Pickens homestead, Umbria Plantation, was destroyed by fire in 1971.

== Tornadoes ==
On April 27, 2011 a destructive, long-tracked EF3 tornado passed to the northwest of town, causing damage to sparsely populated areas. It killed seven and injured at least 52 others along its path. On March 25, 2021, another long-tracked EF3 tornado passed southeast of town, destroying or heavily damaging numerous structures and trees. It injured 13 people along its track, which was the seventh longest track in state history. On February 3, 2022, an EF2 tornado caused heavy damage to the town, killing one person and injuring eight others.

== Demographics ==
Based upon the census result of the year 2000 Sawyerville had a population of 795 residents with a population decrease to an estimated 500 by the year 2017. The area is composed of 88.5% African American, 11.1 Caucasian, 1.0 Hispanic, 0.4 mixed race and 0.1 other.

== Notable residents ==
- Charles McGruder, slave
- Curtis Travis, member of the Alabama House of Representatives and born in Sawyerville
