= Richard H. Magruder =

American politician (died 1884)

Member of the Maryland Senate
- In office 1882 – September 23, 1884

Personal details
- Born: Prince George's County, Maryland, U.S.
- Died: September 23, 1884 (aged 42) Bladensburg, Maryland, U.S.
- Party: Republican
- Relatives: Caleb Clarke Magruder Jr. (cousin)
- Occupation: Politician

Richard H. Magruder (died September 23, 1884) was a politician from Maryland. He served in the Maryland Senate from 1882 to his death in 1884.

== Early life ==
Richard H. Magruder was born in Prince George's County, Maryland.

== Career ==
Magruder was a Republican. In 1881, Magruder was elected to the Maryland Senate, representing Prince George's County, defeating his cousin Caleb Clarke Magruder Jr. He was re-elected in 1883. He served from 1882 to his death.

== Personal life ==
Magruder died on September 23, 1884, at the age of 42, at his home in Bladensburg, Maryland.
