= Tishabee, Alabama =

Unincorporated community in Alabama, US

- Unincorporated community
- Location within Alabama Location within the United States
- Coordinates: 32°38′15″N 87°59′55″W
- Country: United States
- State: Alabama
- County: Greene
- Elevation: 141 ft (43 m)
- Time zone: UTC-6 (Central (CST))
  - Summer (DST): UTC-5 (CDT)
- Area codes: 205 and 659
- GNIS feature ID: 157162

Tishabee, also known as Garretts Shop, is an unincorporated community in Greene County, Alabama, United States.

== History ==
The name Tishabee is derived from the Choctaw words tishu, meaning "assistant (to the chief)" and abi, meaning "killer". The community was first settled in 1817 by Richard Bragg, who also developed Bragg's Bluff. Bragg's Bluff was located 3 miles (4.8 km) west of Tishabee on the banks of the Tombigbee River. A post office operated under the name Tishabee from 1883 to 1901.
