= Philip W. Magruder =

American politician (1838–1907)

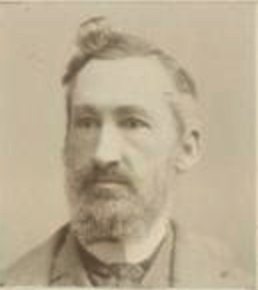

Member of the Virginia House of Delegates from Shenandoah County
- In office December 8, 1887 – December 6, 1893
- Preceded by: Francis E. Rice
- Succeeded by: Jacob G. Neff

Personal details
- Born: Philip Wilson Magruder; March 15, 1838 Shenandoah County, Virginia, U. S.
- Died: March 4, 1907 (aged 68) Woodstock, Virginia, U.S.
- Resting place: Massanutten Cemetery, Woodstock, Virginia
- Party: Democratic
- Education: University of Virginia

Military service
- Allegiance: Confederate States
- Branch/service: Confederate States Army
- Rank: Lieutenant
- Unit: 10th Virginia Infantry
- Battles/wars: American Civil War; Battle of Chancellorsville

Philip Wilson Magruder (March 15, 1838 – March 4, 1907) was an American politician who served in the Virginia House of Delegates.

== Early life ==
Magruder was born in Shenandoah County, Virginia to Dr William W. Magruder. His brother, John William Magruder, was a major in the American Civil War and commanded a volunteer company in the Spanish–American War. J. W. Magruder's son was John Magruder, a brigadier general in the U. S. Army. Another brother, Henry C. Magruder, was prominent in the Presbyterian Church at Prairie Grove, Arkansas.

Magruder studied at the Woodstock Academy and Minor's School in Albemarle, before reading law the University of Virginia.

== Military career ==
After his studies, he entered the Confederate States Army as a Corporal in the 10th Virginia Infantry, being promoted to the rank of Lieutenant. He was wounded in the spine and knee during the Battle of Chancellorsville. He joined the Confederate Quartermaster-General's Department and remained in service there until the end of the war.

== Political and law career ==
In 1866, he became a Principal of Woodstock Academy and taught there for several years. Afterwards, he began practicing law on the Shenandoah Circuit Court, serving as both Commissioner in Chancery and Commissioner of Accounts. He formed a partnership with Henry C. Allen.

In 1887, he was chosen as the Democratic candidate for Shenandoah in the Virginia House of Delegates, and held the post for several years. He was offered the nomination for a fourth term in office, but declined.

== Personal life ==
On February 20, 1862, he married Annie Ott (died June 1905). They had five daughters (Ella, Lucy, Sue, Annie, and another) and two sons (Mark W. and Philip). He was a Presbyterian.

On the afternoon of March 4, 1907, Magruder suffered a stroke while working in his office. He was moved home, where he died later that evening. He was buried in Massanutten Cemetery in Woodstock.
