= 2011 Shoal Creek Valley–Ohatchee tornado =

2011 tornado in Alabama, U.S.A

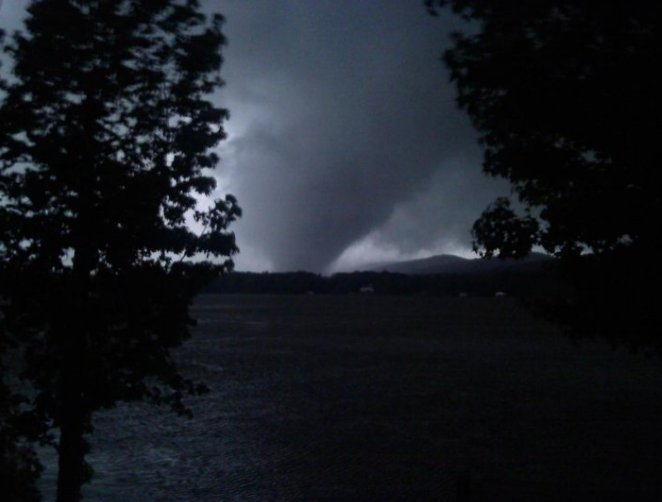
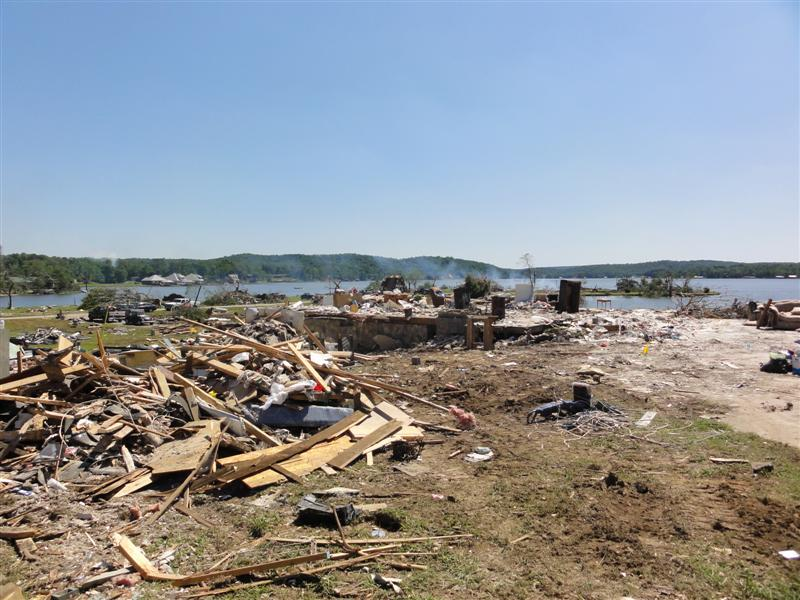
- Clockwise from top: The EF4 tornado approaching and crossing the Coosa River; radar imagery of the tornado in the vicinity of Shoal Creek Valley; devastation along the eastern bank of the Coosa River northwest of Ohatchee, Alabama; an aerial view of the tornado's path in the Shoal Creek Valley; a house leveled on the eastern bank of the Coosa River.

Meteorological history
- Formed: April 27, 2011, 6:28 p.m. CDT (UTC–05:00)
- Dissipated: April 27, 2011, 9:25 p.m. EDT (8:25 PM CDT) (UTC–05:00)
- Duration: 1 hour, 57 minutes

EF4 tornado
- on the Enhanced Fujita scale
- Max width: 1,760 yards (1.00 mi; 1.61 km)
- Path length: 97.33 miles (156.64 km)
- Highest winds: 180 mph (290 km/h)

Overall effects
- Fatalities: 22
- Injuries: 85
- Damage: $366,755,000 (>$524,900,000 in 2025 USD)
- Areas affected: East-central Alabama, particularly Jefferson, St. Clair, Calhoun, and Cherokee counties & western Georgia, particularly Polk, Floyd, and Bartow counties
- Part of the 2011 Super Outbreak and Tornadoes of 2011

During the evening hours of April 27, 2011, a large and violent EF4 tornado devastated the northern portion of Ohatchee and the beachside homes on the Coosa River and many other communities in Eastern Alabama. This tornado was one of the fifteen violent tornadoes to happen during the extremely active 2011 Super Outbreak, which is the largest and costliest tornado outbreak in United States history. The long-track wedge tornado touched down a few miles northeast of Trussville and traveled 97 miles from Alabama to Georgia. Throughout its track, the tornado widened to its maximum peak width of 1,760 yards (1609 m) and peaked with an estimated wind speed of 180 mph (290 km/h); the tornado caused 22 fatalities and injured 85 people and did $367 million in damage.

== Meteorological setup ==
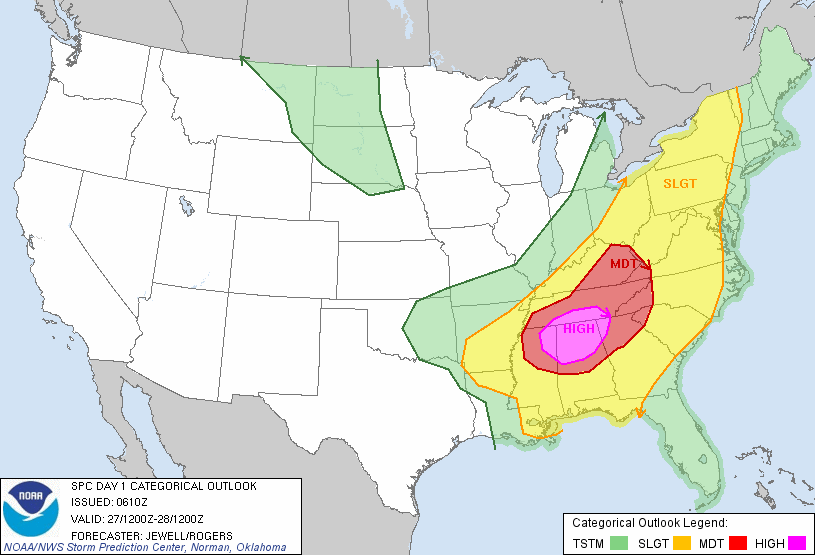
A high risk outlined for most of Alabama and parts of Mississippi, Tennessee, and Georgia.

On April 23, the Storm Prediction Center (SPC) began monitoring the potential for a substantial severe weather outbreak in the extended range. As a shortwave trough tracked across portions of the Mid-South and southeastern United States, moderate instability and strong wind shear ahead of a trailing cold front was expected to promote the development of supercell thunderstorms capable of producing tornadoes, large hail, and damaging winds. Two days before the event, on April 25, the SPC issued a moderate risk of severe weather encompassing portions of central and eastern Kentucky, middle and eastern Tennessee, northeast Mississippi, central and northern Alabama, and northwest Georgia. Due to the combination of rich low-level moisture, strong shear, and focused large-scale ascent, there was relatively high confidence across the outlined area for strong tornadoes – a tornado rated EF2 or higher on the Enhanced Fujita scale – and widespread damaging winds. By the morning of April 27, the SPC upgraded to a high risk of severe weather, noting that a dangerous tornado outbreak capable of producing several violent – EF4 tornado or stronger on the Enhanced Fujita scale – and long-track tornadoes was expected.

Shortly before noon, the probability of tornadoes within 25 miles of a location was increased even further to 45%, a level exceeding even typical high-risk standards, for an area including Tuscaloosa. The forecast continued to emphasize the risk of strong/violent and very damaging tornadoes, as confidence increased even further regarding the risk of an extreme, high-end tornado outbreak. Throughout the afternoon hours, in the wake of two earlier mesoscale convective systems, the air mass across western and northern portions of Alabama began to quickly destabilize, with mixed layer convective available potential energy (CAPE) estimated in the 2500–4000 j/kg range and low-level dew points of 70–72 °F (21–22 °C) surging northward from Louisiana. Meanwhile, the wind shear environment became substantially more favorable as an 80–100 kn mid-level jet ejected eastward into the region. At 1:45 p.m. CDT (18:45 UTC), a Particularly Dangerous Situation (PDS) tornado watch was issued for much of Alabama, northwest Georgia, southeast Mississippi, and southern middle Tennessee, with a >95% probability of at least two tornadoes and one or more strong tornadoes.

== Event summary ==
- Damage survey track of this tornado (centermost red line), as well as the tracks of other EF3+ tornadoes that occurred during 2011 Super Outbreak. (Interactive map, click or tap to view in detail); View mapdata Key EF0 65–85 mph (105–137 km/h); EF1 86–110 mph (138–177 km/h); EF2 111–135 mph (179–217 km/h); EF3 136–165 mph (219–266 km/h); EF4 166–200 mph (267–322 km/h); EF5 ≥201 mph (323 km/h)

=== Formation in Jefferson county & devastation in St. Clair County ===
Shortly after the dissipation of a previous violent tornado, which caused severe damage in Tuscaloosa and northern suburbs of Birmingham, the parent supercell quickly cycled and produced a new tornado just to the north of Trussville in far eastern Jefferson County at 6:28 p.m. CDT (UTC–05:00). Initially very weak and insignificant, the tornado moved east-northeastwards, crossing I-59 and causing minor damage as it snapped and uprooted hardwood trees. Here, the tornado was approximately 100 yards (0.091 km) wide, fluctuating between EF0-EF1 intensity. Crossing into St. Clair County at 6:32 p.m., the tornado approached and passed through the northern side of Margaret, growing further to 250 yards (0.23 km) wide as it did so, yet remaining at EF0 intensity. This width was maintained as the tornado passed northwest of Odenville, regaining EF1 intensity as numerous hardwood trees were snapped and uprooted at winds of up to 105 miles per hour (169 km/h). The tornado then turned northeastwards, moving along a path just south and parallel to the Beaver Creek Mountains before veering east-northeastwards into Shoal Creek Valley north of Ragland, where it quickly became significant.

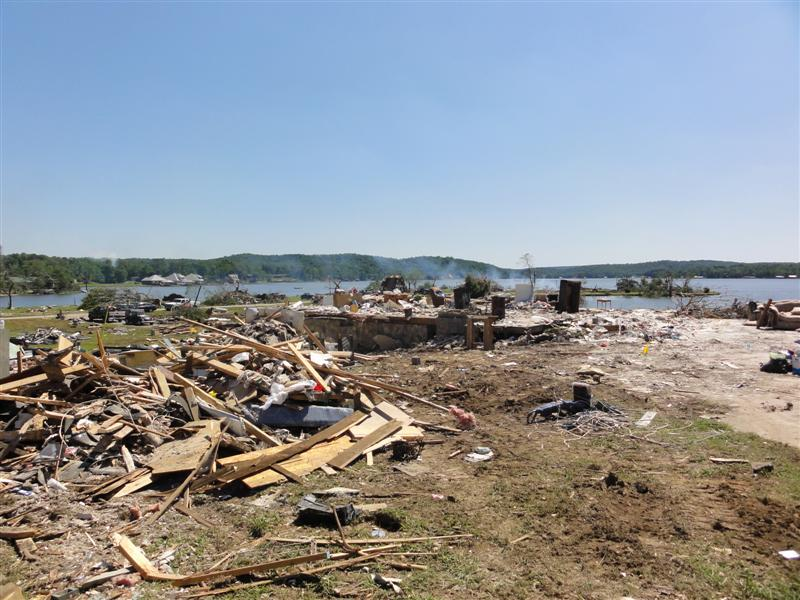
A house leveled at EF4 intensity in Shoal Creek valley near Neely Henry Lake.

In Shoal Creek Valley, the tornado followed Shoal Creek Road, both strengthening and widening. The tornado abruptly strengthened to low-end EF3 intensity with winds of up to 140 mph, collapsing all of the exterior walls of several brick facade homes, leaving interior rooms and fireplaces the only thing left standing in many cases. Swaths of trees along the adjacent mountains were snapped or felled. Just to the east, the tornado was “at least” 880 yards (0.80 km; 0.50 mi) wide, with every tree along the center of the damage path mangled. After a brief weakening phase, the tornado abruptly strengthened to mid-range EF4 intensity, completely destroying a 40-year-old house partially made of brick, killing one person and severely injuring another. In contrast, houses on the other side of the street were spared exterior walls. Dozens of other houses along the road were damaged or completely destroyed amid severe tree damage; of 22 total fatalities from the tornado, 14 occurred along this road alone. Retaining its violent status, the tornado, now up to one mile wide, then turned due eastwards and crossed over the Neely Henry Lake/Coosa River into northern Calhoun County, damaging or destroying several lakeside homes on the western bank. From the Shoal Creek Valley west of the lake, the tornado had picked up a firetruck, carrying it 100–150 yards (0.091–0.137 km) away and dropping it into the water; the driver was thrown with it and survived.

Devastation of structures & vegetation on the eastern bank of Neely Henry Lake. Trees are left denuded and partially debarked.

=== Further devastation in Calhoun, Etowah, and Cherokee counties ===
Entering Calhoun County at 8:04 p.m. CDT, the tornado made landfall west of AL 77, destroying several houses at mid-range EF4 intensity just west of the road. Many houses, some well-built, were leveled or almost completely swept away, and large trees were left denuded and partially debarked. Nearby outbuildings and mobile homes were similarly destroyed, though only granted an EF2 rating. Four people died in this area, although the exact amount of injuries sustained was unknown; the maximum winds in this area reached 180 miles per hour (290 km/h). The tornado then turned northeastwards once more, shrinking in size and weakening to mid-range EF3 intensity.

Along Cochran Springs Road north of Ohatchee, several houses, older and of weaker construction, completely collapsed as the tornado struck with winds of up to 150 miles per hour (240 km/h). The tornado then briefly weakened to EF2 intensity, causing significant roof damage to well-built homes and felling trees. The tornado regained EF3 intensity shortly thereafter, which it retained for a considerable amount of its time in Calhoun County. Along Rock Springs Road, the tornado denuded and partially debarked several trees and caused significant roof damage to houses nearby, still at least 1 mile (1,800 yd; 1.6 km) wide. The tornado then crossed US 431, where numerous trees were felled and at least one house had large portions of its roof removed. To the east, just off of Reads Mill Road, the tornado collapsed the exterior walls of a well-built brick home and damaged several other houses and mobile homes, retaining its mile wide width.

A building completely leveled at EF4 intensity along Rocky Hollow Road.

The tornado, now having weakened back to EF2 strength, stumped, snapped, and uprooted several trees and removed portions of roof from multiple well built houses. Another house, although comparatively poorer in construction, had most of its wall collapsed. The tornado then abruptly intensified to mid-range EF4 intensity along Rocky Hollow Road northeast of Wellington, damaging or destroying several houses and buildings. One church building was completely leveled and possibly swept clean, and nearby trees were denuded and partially debarked. The tornado then weakened back to EF2 intensity, at which it would remain for the large majority of its remaining time in Calhoun County. Just south of the Etowah County border, the tornado completely destroyed a mobile home and caused significant roof damage to several homes, scattering debris downwind and snapping numerous trees; by this point, the tornado had killed nine people in Calhoun County. The tornado weakened to EF1 intensity as it very briefly entered Etowah County, mainly causing tree damage there.

Moving back into Calhoun County, the tornado produced a wide swath of tree damage up a hill, causing severe roof damage to several houses along US 278. Many trees were reduced to stubs, and "massive" tree damage occurred on an adjacent mountain. The tornado then killed another person, making for an eighth death in the county, and damaged several houses at the county border before entering Cherokee County, during which it regained EF2 intensity, severely damaging several mobile homes along County Road 67. The tornado subsequently strengthened further to mid-range EF3 intensity as it crossed AL 9 north of Piedmont, collapsing all of the walls of a "not-so-well-built" home with winds of 150 miles per hour (240 km/h). The tornado then weakened back to EF1 intensity, snapping and uprooting swaths of hardwood trees and causing severe roof damage to a cinder block structure as it moved through southern Cherokee County. Nearing the Georgia border, the tornado, by this point at least 880 yards (0.50 mi; 0.80 km) wide, quickly and briefly strengthened to high-end EF3 intensity, completely collapsing a well-built frame home and damaging several trees and structures nearby; surveyors noted that the damage here was possibly indicative of EF4 intensity. The tornado subsequently weakened back to EF1 intensity. One fatality occurred along this portion of the path.

=== Continuation into Georgia & damage and dissipation in Polk, Floyd, and Bartow counties ===
Passing into northwestern Polk County, Georgia six miles southwest of Cave Spring, the tornado immediately strengthened to mid-range EF2 intensity, at which it would remain for a large portion of its time in Georgia. In Polk County, 106 structures sustained damage; 49 minor, 34 major, 23 destroyed. Along the Polk–Floyd county line, the tornado destroyed at least eight chicken houses. Moving into southern Floyd County and passing south of Cave Spring, the tornado caused severe roof damage to a house and snapped adjacent trees. To the east, along Old Cedartown Road, the tornado collapsed the exterior walls of a house. Maximum winds in Polk & Floyd counties (and Georgia as a whole) reached 125 miles per hour (201 km/h). Four people were injured in the latter county. Along Highway 27, the tornado removed the roof from an outbuilding at low-end EF2 intensity. The tornado subsequently weakened back to EF1 intensity north of Bethel, which it would remain at as it passed southeast of Rome. The tornado then crossed into far-western Bartow County, shrinking and weakening to EF0-EF1 intensity as it felled trees & power lines and destroyed two chicken houses, subsequently dissipating four miles southwest of Kingston along US 411 at 9:45 p.m. EST (8:45 p.m. CDT), having tracked for 97.33 miles (156.64 km) and killing 22 people, injuring 81.

== Aftermath ==
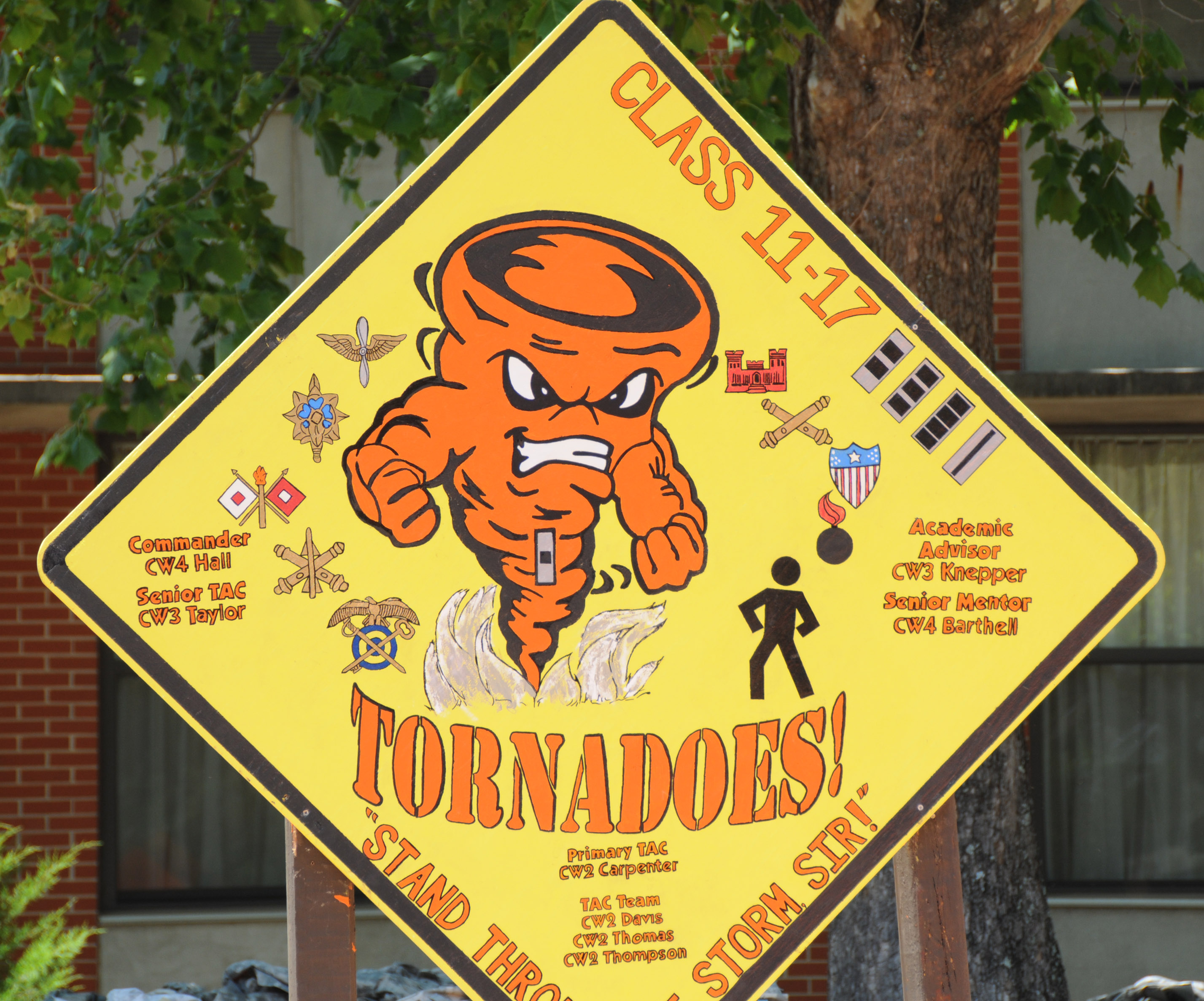
A class sign for Warrant Office Career College Class 11–17, at Fort Novosel dedicated to the April tornado victims in Shoal Creek Valley.

After the tornadoes of the 27th, Alabama's Surplus Property Division (a subdivision of the Alabama Department of Economic and Community Affairs) provided supplies for devastated communities in Calhoun County and arranged shelters for people who lost their homes in Jefferson and St. Clair counties. The agency also provided ten of thousands of bags of ice, cases of water bottles, meal kits, and boxes of tarpaulins.

== See also ==
- Tornadoes of 2011
- List of tornadoes in the 2011 Super Outbreak
- List of F4 and EF4 tornadoes (2010–2019)
- Tornado outbreak sequence of March 24–28, 2021
