= Eoline, Alabama =

Unincorporated community in Alabama, United States

- Unincorporated community
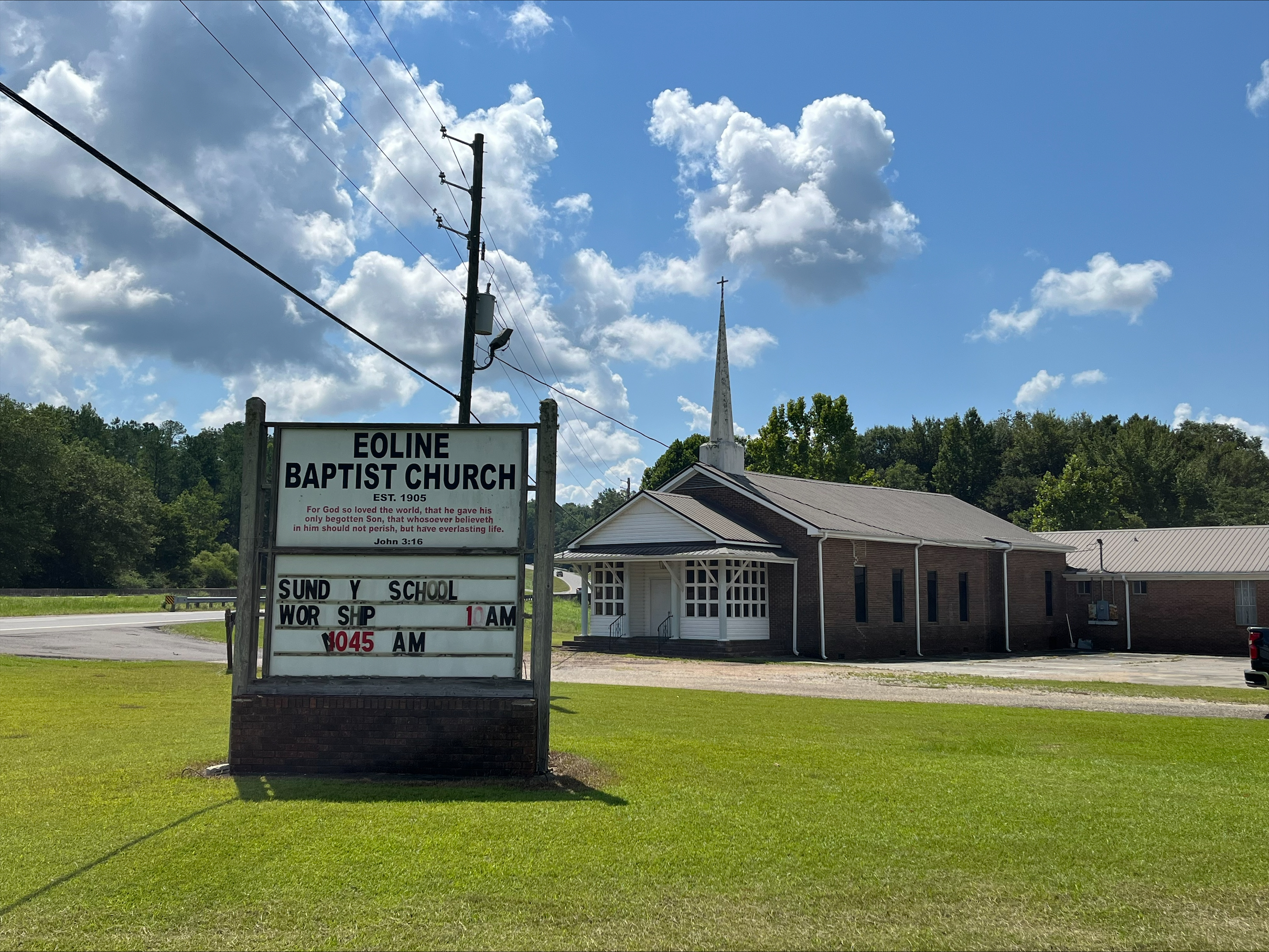
- Eoline Baptist Church

- Location within the state of Alabama Eoline, Alabama (the United States)
- Coordinates: 32°59′42″N 87°13′56″W
- Country: United States
- State: Alabama
- County: Bibb
- Elevation: 276 ft (84 m)

Population (2020)
  - Total: 4,269
- Time zone: UTC-6 (Central (CST))
  - Summer (DST): UTC-5 (CDT)
- Area codes: 205, 659
- GNIS feature ID: 159575

Eoline /iˈoʊ.lɪn/ is an unincorporated community in Bibb County, Alabama, United States. Eoline is located on U.S. Route 82, 8.1 miles (13.0 km) northwest of Centreville. During the 2011 Super Outbreak, the Eoline Fire Department was destroyed by an EF3 tornado.

== History ==
The community was located on the Mobile and Ohio Railroad and was named after the daughter of the M&O Vice-president, Edward Russell. At one point, Eoline was home to three stores, a boarding stable, hotel, sawmill, and newspaper, the Eoline Messenger. A post office operated under the name Eoline from 1898 to 1957.
